= List of Scrubs episodes =

Scrubs is an American medical sitcom television series created by Bill Lawrence, which premiered on October 2, 2001, on NBC. The series aired for seven seasons from 2001–2008 on NBC, and two seasons from 2009–2010 on ABC. The first eight seasons starred Zach Braff, Sarah Chalke, Donald Faison, Ken Jenkins, John C. McGinley, and Judy Reyes, with Neil Flynn in a starring role from the second season. The eighth season finale, "My Finale", was originally planned to also be the series finale. However, ABC renewed the series for a ninth season in 2009. It focused on a mix of new and old characters in a new setting. Faison and McGinley returned as series regulars while Braff appeared in six episodes. Chalke, Flynn, and Jenkins returned as guest stars, while Reyes did not appear at all. Eliza Coupe, Kerry Bishé, Michael Mosley, and Dave Franco joined as series regulars. The series was canceled after season 9 in May 2010, after the final episode had aired on March 17, 2010.

All series episode titles begin with the word "My", unless the bulk of the episode is narrated by someone other than J.D. (Braff), in which case they are named "His Story", "Her Story", or "Their Story", with Roman numerals denoting subsequent episodes by the same name. During season 9, episode titles start with the word "Our" instead of "My".

A revival of the series was announced in 2025, with Braff, Faison, Chalke, McGinley, and Reyes returning along with the setting of the first eight seasons, rendering the ninth season non-canon. The first season premiered on ABC on February 25, 2026. In April 2026, the revival series was renewed for a second season which premiered on September 30, 2026.

== Series overview ==
Scrubs (TV series) series overview
Series	Season	Episodes	Originally released			Average viewers (millions)	Rank
Series	Season	Episodes	First released	Last released	Network	Average viewers (millions)	Rank
Original series	1	24	October 2, 2001	May 21, 2002	NBC	11.20	38
Original series	2	22	September 26, 2002	April 17, 2003	NBC	15.94	14
Original series	3	22	October 2, 2003	May 4, 2004	NBC	10.41	43
Original series	4	25	August 31, 2004	May 10, 2005	NBC	6.90	88
Original series	5	24	January 3, 2006	May 16, 2006	NBC	6.40	98
Original series	6	22	November 30, 2006	May 17, 2007	NBC	6.41	87
Original series	7	11	October 25, 2007	May 8, 2008	NBC	6.38	115
Original series	8	19	January 6, 2009	May 6, 2009	ABC	5.54	106
Original series	9	13	December 1, 2009	March 17, 2010	ABC	3.79	116
Revival series	1	9	February 25, 2026	April 15, 2026	ABC	8.70 (Note: Multi-platform viewership including ABC, Disney+ and Hulu.)	22
Revival series	2	10	September 30, 2026	December 9, 2026	ABC	TBA	TBA

== Original series episodes ==
^{†} denotes a "supersized" episode, running an extended length of 25–28 minutes.

=== Season 1 (2001–02) ===
Scrubs season 1 episodes
No. overall	No. in season	Title	Directed by	Written by	Original release date	Prod. code	U.S. viewers (millions)
1	1	"My First Day"	Adam Bernstein	Bill Lawrence	October 2, 2001	535G	15.45
2	2	"My Mentor"	Adam Bernstein	Bill Lawrence	October 4, 2001	S101	16.29
3	3	"My Best Friend's Mistake"	Adam Bernstein	Eric Weinberg	October 9, 2001	S102	11.78
4	4	"My Old Lady"	Marc Buckland	Matt Tarses	October 16, 2001	S103	12.71
5	5	"My Two Dads"	Craig Zisk	Neil Goldman & Garrett Donovan	October 23, 2001	S104	11.04
6	6	"My Bad"	Marc Buckland	Gabrielle Allan	October 30, 2001	S105	12.44
7	7	"My Super Ego"	Peter Lauer	Mike Schwartz	November 6, 2001	S106	10.90
8	8	"My Fifteen Minutes"	Lawrence Trilling	Eric Weinberg	November 15, 2001	S108	17.24
9	9	"My Day Off"	Elodie Keene	Janae Bakken	November 20, 2001	S107	12.32
10	10	"My Nickname"	Matthew Diamond	Bill Lawrence	November 27, 2001	S110	12.25
11	11	"My Own Personal Jesus"	Jeff Melman	Debra Fordham	December 11, 2001	S109	10.57
12	12	"My Blind Date"	Marc Buckland	Mark Stegemann	January 8, 2002	S112	11.67
13	13	"My Balancing Act"	Michael Spiller	Neil Goldman & Garrett Donovan	January 15, 2002	S113	11.25
14	14	"My Drug Buddy"	Michael Spiller	Matt Tarses	January 22, 2002	S111	11.03
15	15	"My Bed Banter & Beyond"^{†}	Lawrence Trilling	Gabrielle Allan	February 5, 2002	S115	12.63
16	16	"My Heavy Meddle"	Will Mackenzie	Mike Schwartz	February 26, 2002	S116	12.56
17	17	"My Student"	Matthew Diamond	Story by : Mark Stegemann; Teleplay by : Janae Bakken & Debra Fordham	March 5, 2002	S114	10.99
18	18	"My Tuscaloosa Heart"	Lawrence Trilling	Story by : Janae Bakken; Teleplay by : Debra Fordham & Mark Stegemann	March 12, 2002	S117	11.44
19	19	"My Old Man"	Adam Bernstein	Matt Tarses	April 9, 2002	S120	10.86
20	20	"My Way or the Highway"	Adam Bernstein	Eric Weinberg	April 16, 2002	S118	9.32
21	21	"My Sacrificial Clam"	Marc Buckland	Story by : Debra Fordham; Teleplay by : Janae Bakken & Mark Stegemann	April 30, 2002	S119	10.66
22	22	"My Occurrence"	Lawrence Trilling	Bill Lawrence	May 7, 2002	S122	9.88
23	23	"My Hero"	Michael Spiller	Neil Goldman & Garrett Donovan	May 14, 2002	S123	12.50
24	24	"My Last Day"	Michael Spiller	Gabrielle Allan & Mike Schwartz	May 21, 2002	S121	11.65

=== Season 2 (2002–03) ===
Scrubs (2001 TV series) season 2 episodes
No. overall	No. in season	Title	Directed by	Written by	Original release date	Prod. code	U.S. viewers (millions)
25	1	"My Overkill"	Adam Bernstein	Bill Lawrence	September 26, 2002	201	22.31
26	2	"My Nightingale"	Craig Zisk	Eric Weinberg	October 3, 2002	203	18.94
27	3	"My Case Study"	Michael Spiller	Gabrielle Allan	October 10, 2002	205	18.64
28	4	"My Big Mouth"	Paul Quinn	Mark Stegemann	October 17, 2002	206	17.78
29	5	"My New Coat"	Marc Buckland	Matt Tarses	October 24, 2002	202	14.11
30	6	"My Big Brother"	Michael Spiller	Tim Hobert	October 31, 2002	204	18.02
31	7	"My First Step"^{†}	Lawrence Trilling	Mike Schwartz	November 7, 2002	207	17.53
32	8	"My Fruit Cups"	Ken Whittingham	Janae Bakken	November 14, 2002	208	19.93
33	9	"My Lucky Day"	Lawrence Trilling	Debra Fordham	December 5, 2002	209	19.50
34	10	"My Monster"	Gail Mancuso	Angela Nissel	December 12, 2002	210	16.49
35	11	"My Sex Buddy"	Will Mackenzie	Neil Goldman & Garrett Donovan	January 2, 2003	212	12.81
36	12	"My New Old Friend"	Chris Koch	Gabrielle Allan	January 9, 2003	211	17.18
37	13	"My Philosophy"	Chris Koch	Story by : Bill Lawrence; Teleplay by : Matt Tarses & Tim Hobert	January 16, 2003	213	18.02
38	14	"My Brother, My Keeper"	Michael Spiller	Eric Weinberg	January 23, 2003	214	14.09
39	15	"His Story"^{†}	Ken Whittingham	Bonnie Schneider & Hadley Davis	January 30, 2003	215	17.25
40	16	"My Karma"	Marc Buckland	Janae Bakken & Debra Fordham	February 20, 2003	216	13.45
41	17	"My Own Private Practice Guy"	Marc Buckland	Angela Nissel & Mark Stegemann	March 13, 2003	218	15.64
42	18	"My T.C.W."	Adam Bernstein	Bill Lawrence	March 20, 2003	217	14.21
43	19	"My Kingdom"	Michael Spiller	April Pesa	March 27, 2003	219	13.56
44	20	"My Interpretation"	Will Mackenzie	Story by : Mike Schwartz; Teleplay by : Neil Goldman & Garrett Donovan	April 3, 2003	220	15.29
45	21	"My Drama Queen"	Michael Spiller	Will Berson	April 10, 2003	221	11.95
46	22	"My Dream Job"	Bill Lawrence	Tim Hobert & Matt Tarses	April 17, 2003	222	14.67

=== Season 3 (2003–04) ===
Scrubs season 3 episodes
No. overall	No. in season	Title	Directed by	Written by	Original release date	Prod. code	U.S. viewers (millions)
47	1	"My Own American Girl"	Bill Lawrence	Bill Lawrence	October 2, 2003	301	17.15
48	2	"My Journey"	Michael Spiller	Tim Hobert	October 9, 2003	302	15.03
49	3	"My White Whale"	Michael Spiller	Eric Weinberg	October 23, 2003	304	14.08
50	4	"My Lucky Night"^{†}	John Inwood	Neil Goldman & Garrett Donovan	October 30, 2003	305	11.94
51	5	"My Brother, Where Art Thou?"	Marc Buckland	Mike Schwartz	November 6, 2003	306	11.33
52	6	"My Advice to You"	Gail Mancuso	Debra Fordham	November 13, 2003	307	12.64
53	7	"My Fifteen Seconds"	Ken Whittingham	Mark Stegemann	November 20, 2003	308	12.83
54	8	"My Friend the Doctor"	Ken Whittingham	Gabrielle Allan	December 4, 2003	309	12.18
55	9	"My Dirty Secret"	Chris Koch	Matt Tarses	December 11, 2003	303	11.09
56	10	"My Rule of Thumb"	Craig Zisk	Janae Bakken	January 22, 2004	310	11.41
57	11	"My Clean Break"	Chris Koch	Angela Nissel	February 3, 2004	311	9.23
58	12	"My Catalyst"^{†}	Michael Spiller	Bill Lawrence	February 10, 2004	316	11.04
59	13	"My Porcelain God"^{†}	Adam Bernstein	Tim Hobert & Eric Weinberg	February 17, 2004	317	8.15
60	14	"My Screw Up"	Chris Koch	Neil Goldman & Garrett Donovan	February 24, 2004	315	8.21
61	15	"My Tormented Mentor"	Craig Zisk	Gabrielle Allan	March 2, 2004	314	8.19
62	16	"My Butterfly"	Henry Chan	Justin Spitzer	March 16, 2004	312	6.60
63	17	"My Moment of Un-Truth"	Gail Mancuso	Rich Eustis	March 30, 2004	313	9.21
64	18	"His Story II"	Jason Ensler	Mark Stegemann	April 6, 2004	318	8.02
65	19	"My Choosiest Choice of All"	Adam Bernstein	Mike Schwartz	April 20, 2004	319	8.01
66	20	"My Fault"	Richard Alexander Wells	Debra Fordham	April 22, 2004	320	13.56
67	21	"My Self-Examination"	Randall Winston	Janae Bakken	April 27, 2004	321	9.21
68	22	"My Best Friend's Wedding"	Bill Lawrence	Tim Hobert & Eric Weinberg	May 4, 2004	322	11.11

=== Season 4 (2004–05) ===
Scrubs season 4 episodes
No. overall	No. in season	Title	Directed by	Written by	Original release date	Prod. code	U.S. viewers (millions)
69	1	"My Old Friend's New Friend"	Bill Lawrence	Eric Weinberg	August 31, 2004	401	8.46
70	2	"My Office"	Gail Mancuso	Matt Tarses	September 7, 2004	402	7.90
71	3	"My New Game"	Ken Whittingham	Gabrielle Allan	September 14, 2004	403	7.56
72	4	"My First Kill"	Ken Whittingham	Tad Quill	September 21, 2004	404	8.58
73	5	"Her Story"	John Inwood	Angela Nissel	September 28, 2004	405	8.99
74	6	"My Cake"	Henry Chan	Neil Goldman & Garrett Donovan	October 12, 2004	406	7.93
75	7	"My Common Enemy"	Joanna Kerns	Bill Callahan	October 19, 2004	407	8.17
76	8	"My Last Chance"	Zach Braff	Mike Schwartz	October 26, 2004	408	6.94
77	9	"My Malpractical Decision"	Gail Mancuso	Janae Bakken	November 9, 2004	409	8.93
78	10	"My Female Trouble"	Chris Koch	Debra Fordham	November 16, 2004	410	8.37
79	11	"My Unicorn"	Matthew Perry	Gabrielle Allan & Tad Quill	November 23, 2004	411	8.13
80	12	"My Best Moment"	Chris Koch	Angela Nissel	December 7, 2004	412	6.97
81	13	"My Ocardial Infarction"	Ken Whittingham	Mark Stegemann	January 18, 2005	413	6.52
82	14	"My Lucky Charm"	Chris Koch	Mike Schwartz	January 25, 2005	415	7.02
83	15	"My Hypocritical Oath"	Craig Zisk	Tim Hobert	February 1, 2005	414	8.04
84	16	"My Quarantine"	Michael Spiller	Tad Quill	February 8, 2005	416	6.72
85	17	"My Life in Four Cameras"	Adam Bernstein	Debra Fordham	February 15, 2005	417	6.66
86	18	"My Roommates"	Craig Zisk	Tim Hobert	February 22, 2005	418	7.65
87	19	"My Best Laid Plans"	Zach Braff	Bill Callahan	March 1, 2005	419	7.15
88	20	"My Boss' Free Haircut"	John Inwood	Mark Stegemann	March 29, 2005	420	6.38
89	21	"My Lips Are Sealed"	John Michel	Janae Bakken	April 5, 2005	421	5.76
90	22	"My Big Move"	Victor Nelli, Jr.	Bonnie Sikowitz	April 12, 2005	422	5.38
91	23	"My Faith in Humanity"	Ken Whittingham	David Feinberg	April 19, 2005	423	5.82
92	24	"My Drive-By"	Will Mackenzie	Angela Nissel	April 26, 2005	424	5.96
93	25	"My Changing Ways"	Victor Nelli, Jr.	Bill Lawrence	May 10, 2005	425	6.01

=== Season 5 (2006) ===
Scrubs season 5 episodes
No. overall	No. in season	Title	Directed by	Written by	Original release date	Prod. code	U.S. viewers (millions)
94	1	"My Intern's Eyes"	Bill Lawrence	Bill Lawrence	January 3, 2006	501	7.69
95	2	"My Rite of Passage"	Bill Lawrence	Janae Bakken	January 3, 2006	502	7.84
96	3	"My Day at the Races"	Michael Spiller	Eric Weinberg	January 10, 2006	503	6.87
97	4	"My Jiggly Ball"	Rick Blue	Tim Hobert	January 10, 2006	504	6.87
98	5	"My New God"	Victor Nelli, Jr.	Aseem Batra	January 17, 2006	506	5.87
99	6	"My Missed Perception"	Bill Lawrence	Kevin Biegel	January 17, 2006	507	5.93
100	7	"My Way Home"	Zach Braff	Neil Goldman & Garrett Donovan	January 24, 2006	505	5.45
101	8	"My Big Bird"	Rob Greenberg	Debra Fordham	January 24, 2006	508	5.73
102	9	"My Half-Acre"	Linda Mendoza	Bill Callahan	February 7, 2006	509	6.17
103	10	"Her Story II"	Chris Koch	Mike Schwartz	February 7, 2006	510	7.10
104	11	"My Buddy's Booty"	Randall Winston	Mark Stegemann	February 28, 2006	511	6.73
105	12	"My Cabbage"	John Inwood	Ryan A. Levin	February 28, 2006	512	8.20
106	13	"My Five Stages"	Jay Alaimo	Tad Quill	March 7, 2006	513	5.71
107	14	"My Own Personal Hell"	Adam Bernstein	Eren Celeboglu	March 14, 2006	514	5.80
108	15	"My Extra Mile"	Ken Whittingham	Mark Stegemann	March 21, 2006	515	5.84
109	16	"My Bright Idea"	Michael Spiller	Janae Bakken	March 28, 2006	517	6.75
110	17	"My Chopped Liver"	Will Mackenzie	Debra Fordham	April 4, 2006	516	6.23
111	18	"My New Suit"	Victor Nelli, Jr.	Tim Hobert	April 11, 2006	518	5.92
112	19	"His Story III"	John Inwood	Angela Nissel	April 18, 2006	519	5.72
113	20	"My Lunch"	John Michel	Tad Quill	April 25, 2006	520	6.00
114	21	"My Fallen Idol"	Joanna Kerns	Bill Callahan	May 2, 2006	521	5.07
115	22	"My Déjà Vu, My Déjà Vu"	Linda Mendoza	Mike Schwartz	May 9, 2006	522	6.20
116	23	"My Urologist"	Richard Alexander Wells	Neil Goldman & Garrett Donovan	May 16, 2006	523	6.19
117	24	"My Transition"	Bill Lawrence	Aseem Batra & Kevin Biegel	May 16, 2006	524	6.57

=== Season 6 (2006–07) ===
Scrubs season 6 episodes
No. overall	No. in season	Title	Directed by	Written by	Original release date	Prod. code	U.S. viewers (millions)
118	1	"My Mirror Image"	John Inwood	Tim Hobert	November 30, 2006	601	7.72
119	2	"My Best Friend's Baby's Baby and My Baby's Baby"	Gail Mancuso	Neil Goldman & Garrett Donovan	December 7, 2006	603	8.38
120	3	"My Coffee"	Rick Blue	Tad Quill	December 14, 2006	602	7.73
121	4	"My House"	John Putch	Bill Callahan	January 4, 2007	604	7.29
122	5	"My Friend with Money"	John Michel	Gabrielle Allan	January 11, 2007	605	7.77
123	6	"My Musical"	Will Mackenzie	Debra Fordham	January 18, 2007	607	6.48
124	7	"His Story IV"	Linda Mendoza	Mike Schwartz	February 1, 2007	606	6.90
125	8	"My Road to Nowhere"	Mark Stegemann	Mark Stegemann	February 8, 2007	608	6.25
126	9	"My Perspective"	John Putch	Angela Nissel	February 15, 2007	609	6.23
127	10	"My Therapeutic Month"	Ken Whittingham	Aseem Batra	February 22, 2007	610	5.66
128	11	"My Night to Remember"	Richard Davis	Debra Fordham	March 1, 2007	614	6.76
129	12	"My Fishbowl"	Chris Koch	Kevin Biegel	March 8, 2007	611	5.84
130	13	"My Scrubs"	John Putch	Clarence Livingston	March 15, 2007	612	6.44
131	14	"My No Good Reason"	Zach Braff	Janae Bakken	March 22, 2007	613	6.44
132	15	"My Long Goodbye"^{†}	Victor Nelli, Jr.	Dave Tennant	April 5, 2007	615	4.89
133	16	"My Words of Wisdom"	Victor Nelli, Jr.	Eric Weinberg	April 12, 2007	616	5.05
134	17	"Their Story"	Richard Alexander Wells	Andy Schwartz	April 19, 2007	617	5.61
135	18	"My Turf War"	Bill Lawrence	Sean Russell	April 26, 2007	618	4.65
136	19	"My Cold Shower"	John Inwood	Janae Bakken	May 3, 2007	619	4.95
137	20	"My Conventional Wisdom"^{†}	Michael McDonald	Bill Callahan	May 10, 2007	620	5.31
138	21	"My Rabbit"	John Putch	Kevin Biegel & Aseem Batra	May 17, 2007	621	5.28
139	22	"My Point of No Return"	Linda Mendoza	Neil Goldman & Garrett Donovan	May 17, 2007	622	5.28

=== Season 7 (2007–08) ===
Scrubs season 7 episodes
No. overall	No. in season	Title	Directed by	Written by	Original release date	Prod. code	U.S. viewers (millions)
140	1	"My Own Worst Enemy"	Bill Lawrence	Neil Goldman & Garrett Donovan	October 25, 2007	701	6.95
141	2	"My Hard Labor"	Adam Bernstein	Bill Callahan	November 1, 2007	702	6.58
142	3	"My Inconvenient Truth"	Bill Lawrence	Debra Fordham	November 8, 2007	703	6.27
143	4	"My Identity Crisis"	Gail Mancuso	Dave Tennant	November 15, 2007	704	5.93
144	5	"My Growing Pains"	Zach Braff	Mike Schwartz	November 29, 2007	705	5.91
145	6	"My Number One Doctor"	Will Mackenzie	Janae Bakken	December 6, 2007	706	4.85
146	7	"My Bad Too"	Linda Mendoza	Clarence Livingston	April 10, 2008	707	6.58
147	8	"My Manhood"	Michael McDonald	Angela Nissel	April 17, 2008	708	7.19
148	9	"My Dumb Luck"	Rick Blue	Aseem Batra	April 24, 2008	710	5.39
149	10	"My Waste of Time"	Chris Koch	Andy Schwartz	May 1, 2008	711	5.82
150	11	"My Princess"	Zach Braff	Mark Stegemann	May 8, 2008	709	5.26

=== Season 8 (2009) ===
Scrubs season 8 episodes
No. overall	No. in season	Title	Directed by	Written by	Original release date	Prod. code	U.S. viewers (millions)
151	1	"My Jerks"	Michael Spiller	Angela Nissel	January 6, 2009	801	6.74
152	2	"My Last Words"	Bill Lawrence	Aseem Batra	January 6, 2009	802	6.61
153	3	"My Saving Grace"	Michael Spiller	Janae Bakken	January 13, 2009	803	4.61
154	4	"My Happy Place"	Ken Whittingham	Taii K. Austin	January 13, 2009	804	4.33
155	5	"My ABC's"	Bill Lawrence	Bill Lawrence	January 27, 2009	713	5.07
156	6	"My Cookie Pants"	Gail Mancuso	Clarence Livingston	January 27, 2009	805	4.99
157	7	"My New Role"	Will Mackenzie	Dave Tennant	February 3, 2009	806	4.82
158	8	"My Lawyer's in Love"	Mark Stegemann	Debra Fordham	February 3, 2009	811	4.68
159	9	"My Absence"	John Putch	Debra Fordham & Andy Schwartz	February 10, 2009	812	4.56
160	10	"My Comedy Show"	Ted Wass	Devin O. Mahoney & C. Rego Marquiis	February 10, 2009	807	4.22
161	11	"My Nah Nah Nah"	John Putch	Kevin Biegel	March 18, 2009	712	5.62
162	12	"Their Story II"	Michael McDonald	Andy Schwartz	March 25, 2009	808	5.27
163	13	"My Full Moon"	John Michel	Kevin Biegel	April 1, 2009	813	4.97
164	14	"My Soul on Fire"	Bill Lawrence	Bill Callahan	April 8, 2009	809	4.56
165	15	"My Soul on Fire"	Bill Lawrence	Bill Callahan	April 15, 2009	810	5.06
166	16	"My Cuz"	Linda Mendoza	Kevin Biegel	April 22, 2009	814	4.60
167	17	"My Chief Concern"	Zach Braff	Neil Goldman & Garrett Donovan	May 5, 2009	815	3.71
168	18	"My Finale"	Bill Lawrence	Bill Lawrence	May 6, 2009	816/817	5.07
169	19	"My Finale"	Bill Lawrence	Bill Lawrence	May 6, 2009	816/817	5.07

=== Season 9 (2009–10) ===
Scrubs season 9 episodes
No. overall	No. in season	Title	Directed by	Written by	Original release date	Prod. code	U.S. viewers (millions)
170	1	"Our First Day of School"	Michael Spiller	Bill Lawrence	December 1, 2009	901	4.63
171	2	"Our Drunk Friend"	Michael McDonald	Josh Bycel & Jonathan Groff	December 1, 2009	902	4.43
172	3	"Our Role Models"	Gail Mancuso	Steven Cragg & Brian Bradley	December 8, 2009	903	5.44
173	4	"Our Histories"	Ken Whittingham	Corey Nickerson	December 15, 2009	904	4.22
174	5	"Our Mysteries"	Michael Spiller	Steven Cragg & Brian Bradley	December 22, 2009	909	3.43
175	6	"Our New Girl-Bro"	Michael McDonald	Kevin Etten	January 1, 2010	906	3.06
176	7	"Our White Coats"	John Putch	Andy Schwartz	January 5, 2010	907	3.81
177	8	"Our Couples"	Chris Koch	Prentice Penny	January 5, 2010	908	3.05
178	9	"Our Stuff Gets Real"	John Putch	Leila Strachan	January 12, 2010	905	2.72
179	10	"Our True Lies"	Michael Spiller	Lon Zimmet & Dan Rubin	January 19, 2010	910	3.04
180	11	"Our Dear Leaders"	Peter Lauer	Corey Nickerson & Kevin Etten	January 26, 2010	911	3.17
181	12	"Our Driving Issues"	Eren Celeboglu	Alessia Costantini & Prentice Penny	March 10, 2010	912	4.28
182	13	"Our Thanks"	Rick Blue	Sean Russell	March 17, 2010	913	3.45

== Revival series episodes ==
=== Season 1 (2026) ===
No. overall	No. in season	Title	Directed by	Written by	Original release date	Prod. code	U.S. viewers (millions)
1	1	"My Return"	Zach Braff	Aseem Batra & Tim Hobert	February 25, 2026	1AUP01	4.41
2	2	"My 2nd First Day"	Michael Spiller	Amy Pocha & Seth Cohen	February 25, 2026	1AUP02	3.52
3	3	"My Rom-Com"	Chris Koch	Mathew Harawitz	March 4, 2026	1AUP03	3.35
4	4	"My Poker Face"	Randall Keenan Winston	Michael Hobert	March 11, 2026	1AUP04	3.14
5	5	"My Angel"	Ken Whittingham	Aaron Lee	March 18, 2026	1AUP05	3.07
6	6	"My V.I.P."	Gail Mancuso	Mark Stegemann	March 25, 2026	1AUP06	3.08
7	7	"My Best Friend's Barbecue"	Randall Keenan Winston	Sophie Zucker	April 1, 2026	1AUP07	3.04
8	8	"My Odds"	Chris Koch	Aseem Batra	April 8, 2026	1AUP08	2.94
9	9	"My Celebration"	Randall Keenan Winston	Christopher Eddins & Brianna Porter	April 15, 2026	1AUP09	2.94

=== Season 2 (2026) ===
No. overall	No. in season	Title	Directed by	Written by	Original release date	Prod. code	U.S. viewers (millions)
10	1	"My First Time in a While"	Zach Braff	Mathew Harawitz	September 30, 2026	2AUP01	2.68
11	2	"My Mentee"	Michael Spiller	Mark Stegemann	September 30, 2026	2AUP02	2.01
12	3	"My Ex's Ex"	Gail Mancuso	Michael Hobert	October 7, 2026	2AUP03	2.49
13	4	"My Chief"	Randall Keenan Winston	Mike Royce	October 14, 2026	2AUP04	TBD
14	5	"My Best Friend's Birthday"	Pete Chatmon	Max Searle	October 21, 2026	2AUP05	TBD
15	6	"My Halloween"	TBA	Alan Yanaga	October 28, 2026	TBA	TBD
16	7	"My Story"	TBA	Aseem Batra & Mariam Girgis	November 4, 2026	TBA	TBD
17	8	"My Emergency"	TBA	TBA	November 11, 2026	TBA	TBD
