= Scrubs season 4 =

Scrubs
- Season 4
- DVD cover
- Showrunner: Bill Lawrence
- No. of episodes: 25

Release
- Original network: NBC
- Original release: August 31, 2004 – May 10, 2005

Season chronology
- ← Previous; Season 3 Next → Season 5

The fourth season of the American comedy television series Scrubs premiered on NBC on August 31, 2004, and concluded on May 10, 2005, and consists of 25 episodes. Heather Graham guest starred for an extended run for the first 8 episodes and then another appearance later in the season. Colin Farrell, Matthew Perry (who also directed an episode), Molly Shannon, Clay Aiken, and Tara Reid guest starred. This season was nominated for the Primetime Emmy Award for Outstanding Comedy Series.

As the season opens, Turk (Donald Faison) arrives from his honeymoon with Carla (Judy Reyes) but they soon have issues when Carla tries to change many things about her new husband. Their marriage and Turk's friendship with J.D. (Zach Braff) are also endangered when J.D. and Carla share a drunken kiss. Dr. Cox (John C. McGinley) and Jordan (Christa Miller) learn that their divorce was not final, but this seemingly good news causes friction. Elliot (Sarah Chalke) is still angry with J.D. for breaking her heart, and the situation becomes more uncomfortable still when she dates J.D.'s brother Dan (Tom Cavanagh). J.D. has a new love interest of his own when a new and very attractive psychiatrist, Dr. Molly Clock (Graham), arrives at Sacred Heart. Molly serves as Elliot's mentor during her time at the hospital.

== Cast and characters ==
=== Main cast ===
- Zach Braff as Dr. John "J.D." Dorian
- Sarah Chalke as Dr. Elliot Reid
- Donald Faison as Dr. Chris Turk
- Neil Flynn as Janitor
- Ken Jenkins as Dr. Bob Kelso
- John C. McGinley as Dr. Perry Cox
- Judy Reyes as Nurse Carla Espinosa

=== Recurring roles ===
- Robert Maschio as Dr. Todd Quinlan
- Sam Lloyd as Ted Buckland
- Christa Miller as Jordan Sullivan
- Heather Graham as Dr. Molly Clock
- Johnny Kastl as Dr. Doug Murphy
- Aloma Wright as Nurse Laverne Roberts
- Chrystee Pharris as Kylie
- Martin Klebba as Randall Winston
- Phill Lewis as Dr. Hooch
- Josh Randall as Jake

=== Guest stars ===
- Tom Cavanagh as Dan Dorian
- Richard Kind as Harvey Corman
- Julianna Margulies as Neena Broderick
- Clay Aiken as Kenny
- Michael Boatman as Ron Laver
- Colin Farrell as Billy Callahan
- Jim Hanks as Dr. Turner
- Masi Oka as Franklyn (MT)
- Matthew Perry as Murray Marks
- John Bennett Perry as Gregory Marks
- Tara Reid as Danni Sullivan
- Molly Shannon as Denise Lemmon
- Chuck Woolery as himself
- The Blanks as the Worthless Peons

== Production ==
Tad Quill and Bill Callahan, who Lawrence had worked with on Spin City, came on as co-executive producers. Bonnie Sikowiz returned to write an episode. David Feinberg was hired as a staff writer. Rich Eustis did not return.

=== Writing staff ===
- Bill Lawrence – executive producer/head writer
- Eric Weinberg – co-executive producer
- Matt Tarses – co-executive producer
- Tim Hobert – co-executive producer
- Neil Goldman and Garrett Donovan – co-executive producers
- Gabrielle Allan – co-executive producer
- Tad Quill – co-executive producer
- Bill Callahan – co-executive producer
- Mike Schwartz – producer
- Debra Fordham – co-producer
- Mark Stegemann – co-producer
- Janae Bakken – co-producer
- Angela Nissel – executive story editor
- David Feinberg – staff writer

=== Production staff ===
- Bill Lawrence – executive producer/showrunner
- Randall Winston – producer
- Liz Newman – co-producer
- Danny Rose – associate producer

=== Directors ===
Includes directors who directed 2 or more episodes, or directors who are part of the cast and crew

- Ken Whittingham (4 episodes)
- Chris Koch (3 episodes)
- Zach Braff (2 episodes)
- Gail Mancuso (2 episodes)
- Craig Zisk (2 episodes)
- John Inwood (2 episodes)
- Victor Nelli, Jr. (2 episodes)
- Bill Lawrence (1 episode)
- Matthew Perry (1 episode)
- John Michel (editor) (1 episode)

== Episodes ==
Scrubs season 4 episodes
| No. overall | No. in season | Title | Directed by | Written by | Original release date | Prod. code | U.S. viewers (millions) |
|---|---|---|---|---|---|---|---|
| 69 | 1 | "My Old Friend's New Friend" | Bill Lawrence | Eric Weinberg | August 31, 2004 | 401 | 8.46 |
Turk and Carla start to have issues when Carla tries to change everything about her new husband. Molly Clock (Heather Graham), the hospital's new psychiatrist, becomes friends with Elliot because she believes Turk, J.D. and Carla are shutting her out. Also, when Turk and J.D.'s car blows up, Carla lets him pick out the new ride only to find that instead of a car, he buys three scooters for them, further proving Carla's point that she needs to always be in control. The episode guest stars the Sugarhill Gang.
| 70 | 2 | "My Office" | Gail Mancuso | Matt Tarses | September 7, 2004 | 402 | 7.90 |
J.D. and Elliot are both named the hospital's new chief residents by Dr. Cox, however, due to their recent relationship problems, they find it hard to work together. Meanwhile, Dr. Cox and Turk have great difficulty in the removal of a light bulb from a patient's posterior, although some assistance from the Janitor helps.
| 71 | 3 | "My New Game" | Ken Whittingham | Gabrielle Allan | September 14, 2004 | 403 | 7.56 |
J.D. is annoyed at the janitor for spreading the word that he is the "Co-chief" Resident and Elliot the Chief Resident. Dr. Cox and Jordan have relationship problems when they find out that their divorce was not final, which, while seeming like good news at first, quickly begins to cause friction between them. The other annoying woman in Dr. Cox's life, Dr. Molly Clock, faces off with him over a plastic surgery patient who is upset that she is actually better looking since her reconstructive surgery. J.D. thinks up a new game – "Gravelling" other people by placing stones in their shoes.
| 72 | 4 | "My First Kill" | Ken Whittingham | Tad Quill | September 21, 2004 | 404 | 8.58 |
When J.D. asks Dr. Cox to give the residents a pep talk, Dr. Cox takes things a little too far by telling them that inevitably, they will eventually kill a patient or two, which causes J.D. to wonder whether he has ever specifically let someone die through his own incompetence and comes to the conclusion that he has not done so yet, though Dr. Cox is of the impression that it will happen eventually. Elsewhere, Elliot fights for an ex-drug addict patient to receive a heart valve, and becomes frustrated when Molly goes against her professionally about it. Carla decides to clean Rowdy, and loses him. This leads her to replace the stuffed dog with a replica named Steven, who is 2 inches shorter. J.D. has a dream sequence with patients who died in the first three seasons, including: Mrs. Tanner (Kathryn Joosten), Aaron Simon (Jack Shearer), Elaine (Jill Tracy) and Mr. Bursky (Ted Rogers). Cary Brothers plays a karaoke singer, though he is truly singing his song "Blue Eyes" from the soundtrack for Zach Braff's film Garden State.
| 73 | 5 | "Her Story" | John Inwood | Angela Nissel | September 28, 2004 | 405 | 8.99 |
Told from the perspective of Elliot: she starts to doubt Molly being the perfect mentor when she finds out her boyfriend is a convicted felon. Nevertheless, Dr. Cox helps her decide that personal lives should be kept separate from professional lives. Also Turk is constantly waking up Carla when he goes to bed; and J.D. has concerns that Dr. Cox may have ruined his credibility with the new residents.
| 74 | 6 | "My Cake" | Henry Chan | Neil Goldman & Garrett Donovan | October 12, 2004 | 406 | 7.93 |
J.D.'s brother Dan (Tom Cavanagh) comes to visit with news their father has died. Dr. Cox has difficulty helping J.D. get out of his depression. Meanwhile, Turk has symptoms of diabetes but in his stubbornness refuses to admit it or visit a doctor as Carla wishes. Molly must employ some advanced psychology to force him to face the issue. J.D.'s and Dan's father, Sam Dorian, was played by John Ritter in the episode "My Old Man". The episode was dedicated to the memory of Ritter, who died on September 11, 2003, from an aortic dissection.
| 75 | 7 | "My Common Enemy" | Joanna Kerns | Bill Callahan | October 19, 2004 | 407 | 8.17 |
J.D. is forced to deal with the romance between Elliot and his brother Dan, who is still staying with them after the death of their father. Elsewhere, Dr. Cox and Dr. Kelso get fed up with Molly's perception that everyone is good at heart and seek to prove her wrong.
| 76 | 8 | "My Last Chance" | Zach Braff | Mike Schwartz | October 26, 2004 | 408 | 6.94 |
Molly and J.D. are on the brink of sleeping together, but must first get the permission of Elliot, who cannot resist playing games with J.D. Meanwhile Dr. Cox has to fulfil community service hours by working in an ambulance with Denise Lemmon (Molly Shannon), a very annoying EMT.
| 77 | 9 | "My Malpractical Decision" | Gail Mancuso | Janae Bakken | November 9, 2004 | 409 | 8.93 |
J.D. and Dr. Cox must deal with cunning malpractice attorney Neena Broderick (Julianna Margulies) as she attends to her father. Turk tries to avoid the hypochondriac Harvey Corman (Richard Kind) while Elliot steers her underachieving colleague Doug on a new career path.
| 78 | 10 | "My Female Trouble" | Chris Koch | Debra Fordham | November 16, 2004 | 410 | 8.37 |
J.D. has a difficult time ending his impromptu relationship with Neena as she now represents Mr. Corman – who has decided to sue Turk, over allegations that the surgery Turk performed on him ruined his tennis serve – and asks Jordan for help. Elliot pretends to be a male doctor to avoid issues with a sexist patient who happens to be one of the hospital's board members.
| 79 | 11 | "My Unicorn" | Matthew Perry | Gabrielle Allan & Tad Quill | November 23, 2004 | 411 | 8.13 |
J.D. befriends the son of a noted singer who is unwilling to donate a kidney to his ailing father. Carla and Jordan, despite the warnings of Turk, teach Elliot to use her sexuality to her advantage, which causes catastrophe. The episode guest stars John Bennett Perry as Gregory Marks, Matthew Perry as Murray Marks and Masi Oka as Franklyn.
| 80 | 12 | "My Best Moment" | Chris Koch | Angela Nissel | December 7, 2004 | 412 | 6.97 |
When J.D. has to address a group of pre-med students about what it is like to be a doctor, he strays off the beaten path and chooses to discuss his best moments as a doctor instead. When he challenges the rest of the staff to do so, they all reminisce about their fondest memories in the medical field. Meanwhile, Elliot is forced to face her fear of children when she is left in charge of a ten-year-old boy, whose father is being treated in the ICU. Elsewhere, Dr. Kelso gets a dose of Christmas spirit and stuns the staff with his change of heart.
| 81 | 13 | "My Ocardial Infarction" | Ken Whittingham | Mark Stegemann | January 18, 2005 | 413 | 6.52 |
When Elliot begins to emerge as the better doctor, J.D. is left struggling to catch up. Turk tries to make money from his diabetes until he discovers he must amputate a patient's foot due to diabetes and begins to take it more seriously. Elsewhere, the Janitor feels rejected by his secret crush Elliot when she runs off quickly from their "coffee date." Assuming his nice dress attire scared her off, he makes up a story that he was dressed to impress for his acapella band practice, which leads to Elliot requesting an impromptu performance.
| 82 | 14 | "My Lucky Charm" | Chris Koch | Mike Schwartz | January 25, 2005 | 415 | 7.02 |
A man involved in a bar fight teaches Turk and J.D. about living life to the fullest. Elliot and Carla find their friendship beginning to break down when they cannot stick to their social plans. Also, Dr. Cox gets a vasectomy behind Jordan's back. The episode guest stars Colin Farrell as Billy Callahan.
| 83 | 15 | "My Hypocritical Oath" | Craig Zisk | Tim Hobert | February 1, 2005 | 414 | 8.04 |
J.D. becomes attracted to a bartender named Kylie (Chrystee Pharris), then finds out her new boyfriend has an STD. However, he cannot tell her because of patient/doctor confidentiality. Meanwhile, Dr. Cox anxiously awaits the Lakers/Heat game but must tape it to watch after his shift. His patience is tested when the Janitor threatens to reveal the final score.
| 84 | 16 | "My Quarantine" | Michael Spiller | Tad Quill | February 8, 2005 | 416 | 6.72 |
During a date with Kylie, J.D. has to go to the hospital, and while there he casually remarks that a patient's symptoms resemble SARS, which means that the entire ICU staff — including Jordan's sister Danni on a surprise visit — is trapped in quarantine for the night. J.D. pays a homeless guy to fake a heart attack so he can look more heroic in front of Kylie. The episode guest stars Tara Reid as Danni.
| 85 | 17 | "My Life in Four Cameras" | Adam Bernstein | Debra Fordham | February 15, 2005 | 417 | 6.66 |
When Dr. Cox fumes at Dr. Kelso for firing another staff member due to budget cuts, Dr. Kelso challenges him to balance the budget without firing anyone. Meanwhile, a sitcom writer is admitted, and J.D. starts to fantasize about what it would be like if the hospital were a sitcom, complete with a live audience. Also, Turk and Carla have difficulty trying to keep the romance in their relationship going. The episode guest stars Clay Aiken.
| 86 | 18 | "My Roommates" | Craig Zisk | Tim Hobert | February 22, 2005 | 418 | 7.65 |
J.D. is having some trouble with Kylie. Turk and Carla ask J.D. to move out to give them space. However, his absence causes them to realize they are having problems with their relationship. Meanwhile, Dr. Cox believes his friend's child has autism. The episode guest stars Michael Boatman and features a cameo by Ed McMahon.
| 87 | 19 | "My Best Laid Plans" | Zach Braff | Bill Callahan | March 1, 2005 | 419 | 7.15 |
Molly returns to Sacred Heart, and J.D. blows off his girlfriend Kylie to go out with her. Carla tries not to make "mountains out of molehills" when she realizes Turk is still in contact with an ex-girlfriend. The Janitor bets Dr. Cox that he can get a date with Elliot, the wager being his van against Dr. Cox's Porsche.
| 88 | 20 | "My Boss' Free Haircut" | John Inwood | Mark Stegemann | March 29, 2005 | 420 | 6.38 |
When Carla and Turk are experiencing marital difficulties, J.D. and Elliot do their part to try and cheer them up. Meanwhile, Dr. Cox challenges Dr. Kelso to lead by example and take on a few patients of his own after Kelso criticizes his bedside manner — but he is not aware that the Doctor/Patient relationship has changed. Features Cody Estes in his sixth and final appearance as Young/Child J.D., dating back to "My Super Ego."
| 89 | 21 | "My Lips Are Sealed" | John Michel | Janae Bakken | April 5, 2005 | 421 | 5.76 |
J.D. and Carla get drunk while J.D. is trying to reconcile her and Turk and they accidentally kiss, and both agree to keep the incident secret from Turk. At the hospital, Elliot and Dr. Kelso struggle to maintain their professionalism when faced with a young patient who is suffering from complications after experimenting with erectile dysfunction pills. Meanwhile, Dr. Cox tries to find the balance between being an over-protective father while still trying to be the cool dad after his son falls off the jungle gym.
| 90 | 22 | "My Big Move" | Victor Nelli, Jr. | Bonnie Sikowitz | April 12, 2005 | 422 | 5.38 |
Turk learns about the kiss between J.D. and Carla, and not knowing whom to blame gives them both the silent treatment until he knows who initiated it. Dr. Cox needs Elliot's help in reaching out to a teenage epileptic patient. Jordan gets Botox and renders her face temporarily frozen, which causes a problem when it threatens to keep her from attending Dr. Cox's teaching award acceptance. The Janitor gets unexpected reactions from his new uniform.
| 91 | 23 | "My Faith in Humanity" | Ken Whittingham | David Feinberg | April 19, 2005 | 423 | 5.82 |
J.D. is forced to confront human nature when a dying woman is brought to the hospital by her neighbor, Jake (Josh Randall). Jake helps the patient realize it is time to die. Unfortunately, her brother decides to sue him for this. Elliot goes to Dr. Cox and Carla for romantic advice regarding Jake. Turk is having difficulty in couple's therapy. The episode guest stars Ellen Albertini Dow as Betty and Jim Hanks as Dr. Turner.
| 92 | 24 | "My Drive-By" | Will Mackenzie | Angela Nissel | April 26, 2005 | 424 | 5.96 |
When Turk saves a man's life at the local taco stand, he tries to keep his ego in check as Dr. Cox takes all of the credit. To avoid ruining her new relationship with Jake, Elliot enlists J.D.'s help to prevent her dates from becoming too intimate. Meanwhile, Dr. Kelso terrorizes the hospital from the seat of his new motorized wheelchair until Janitor takes matters into his own hands.
| 93 | 25 | "My Changing Ways" | Victor Nelli, Jr. | Bill Lawrence | May 10, 2005 | 425 | 6.01 |
J.D. prepares to start living life on his own, and strains his friendship with Turk. Elliot makes an effort to pursue a new career opportunity at another hospital in town, and this upsets Carla who thought Elliot was staying, despite the close proximity of the new job. Dr. Cox tries to prevent Jordan from accepting a job at the hospital.
