= Scrubs season 1 =

Scrubs
- Season 1
- DVD cover
- Showrunner: Bill Lawrence
- No. of episodes: 24

Release
- Original network: NBC
- Original release: October 2, 2001 – May 21, 2002

Season chronology
- Next → Season 2

The first season of the American comedy television series Scrubs premiered on NBC on October 2, 2001 and concluded on May 21, 2002 and consists of 24 episodes. Scrubs was created by Bill Lawrence who wrote the pilot as well as three other episodes in the season. Adam Bernstein directed the pilot as well as four other episodes. Neil Flynn was only a guest star in the first season, although he appeared in every episode of the season. Bill Lawrence said if the show had been cancelled at the end of the first season, he would have made the Janitor a figment of J.D.'s imagination.

The first season follows J.D. (Zach Braff) and his best friend Turk (Donald Faison) in their first year out of medical school as interns at Sacred Heart Hospital. J.D. quickly meets his reluctant mentor, Dr. Perry Cox (John C. McGinley); a young woman (and fellow intern) named Elliot (Sarah Chalke), on whom he has a crush; the hospital's janitor (Neil Flynn), who goes out of his way to make J.D.'s life miserable; the Chief of Medicine, Dr. Bob Kelso (Ken Jenkins), who is more concerned about the budget than the patients; and Carla Espinosa (Judy Reyes), the head nurse and Turk's new girlfriend, who puts Turk through the trials and tribulations of being in a serious relationship. The characters face romances and relationship issues, family obligations, overwhelming paperwork, and a tremendous number of patients. The first season also introduces recurring supporting characters such as "The Todd" (Robert Maschio), a boorishly lascivious surgeon; Ted (Sam Lloyd), the hospital's hapless, nervous lawyer; Laverne (Aloma Wright), fellow nurse and mentor to Carla; Jordan Sullivan (Christa Miller), Dr. Cox's caustic administrator ex-wife, and Doug Murphy (Johnny Kastl), a nervous young doctor who often accidentally kills patients.

== Cast and characters ==
=== Main cast ===
- Zach Braff as Dr. John "J.D." Dorian
- Sarah Chalke as Dr. Elliot Reid
- Donald Faison as Dr. Chris Turk
- Ken Jenkins as Dr. Bob Kelso
- John C. McGinley as Dr. Perry Cox
- Judy Reyes as Nurse Carla Espinosa

=== Recurring roles ===
- Neil Flynn as Janitor
- Aloma Wright as Nurse Laverne Roberts
- Robert Maschio as Dr. Todd Quinlan
- Sam Lloyd as Ted Buckland
- Charles Chun as Dr. Phillip Wen
- Johnny Kastl as Dr. Doug Murphy
- Christa Miller as Jordan Sullivan
- Elizabeth Bogush as Alex Hanson

=== Guest stars ===
- Scott Foley as Sean Kelly
- Brendan Fraser as Ben Sullivan
- Michael McDonald as Mike Davis
- Masi Oka as Franklyn (MT)
- Sean Hayes as Nick Murdoch
- DJ Qualls as Josh
- John Ritter as Sam Dorian
- R. Lee Ermey as Janitor's father
- The Blanks as the Worthless Peons
- William Daniels as Dr. Douglas
- Ed Begley Jr. as Dr. Bailey

== Production ==
=== Writing staff ===
- Bill Lawrence – executive producer/head writer
- Eric Weinberg – supervising producer (episodes 2–14) / co-executive producer (episodes 15–24)
- Matt Tarses – consulting producer (episodes 2–14) / co-executive producer (episodes 15–24)
- Neil Goldman and Garrett Donovan – co-producers
- Gabrielle Allan – co-producer
- Mike Schwartz – story editor
- Debra Fordham – staff writer
- Mark Stegemann – staff writer
- Janae Bakken – staff writer

=== Production staff ===
- Bill Lawrence – executive producer/showrunner
- Randall Winston – producer / co-producer (pilot)
- Liz Newman – associate producer
- Danny Rose – associate producer
- Mychelle Deschamps – producer (pilot)

=== Directors ===
Includes directors who directed 2 or more episodes

- Adam Bernstein – 5 episodes (including pilot)
- Michael Spiller – 4 episodes
- Lawrence Trilling – 4 episodes
- Marc Buckland – 4 episodes
- Matthew Diamond – 2 episodes

== Episodes ==
Scrubs season 1 episodes
No. overall	No. in season	Title	Directed by	Written by	Original release date	Prod. code	U.S. viewers (millions)
1	1	"My First Day"	Adam Bernstein	Bill Lawrence	October 2, 2001	535G	15.45
In the series opener, all the major characters are introduced as J.D., Turk and Elliot start life at Sacred Heart Hospital.
2	2	"My Mentor"	Adam Bernstein	Bill Lawrence	October 4, 2001	S101	16.29
J.D. tries to get to know Dr. Cox, but is rebuffed. Turk actively pursues Carla and succeeds through candor where swagger and machismo have failed. Elliot gets on Carla's wrong side. J.D. tries to convince his patient (John Ducey) to quit smoking.
3	3	"My Best Friend's Mistake"	Adam Bernstein	Eric Weinberg	October 9, 2001	S102	11.78
Elliot takes issue with the terms of endearment Dr. Kelso uses for her, but naïvely follows Dr. Cox's advice and confronts him about it. J.D. misses Turk's company because they are both too busy to hang out, and he worries that a patient's post-op reaction is Turk's fault. Elliot and J.D. are getting close, but an interrupted kiss might make the difference between being friends and something more.
4	4	"My Old Lady"	Marc Buckland	Matt Tarses	October 16, 2001	S103	12.71
The three interns have to face death for the first time: J.D.'s patient is a headstrong but kindly old woman, Turk's is a young man who just needs some company, and Elliot's is a Hispanic woman who does not speak English. The episode's writer, Matt Tarses, won the 2003 Humanitas Prize in the 30 Minute Category for this episode.
5	5	"My Two Dads"	Craig Zisk	Neil Goldman & Garrett Donovan	October 23, 2001	S104	11.04
J.D. has to decide between Dr. Cox or Dr. Kelso as a mentor. The decision is not made any easier when all three, along with Dr. Kelso's lapdog Dr. Steadman, play a game of golf together. Elliot believes her breasts to have healing powers. In order to make up to Carla, Turk gives her a pen that, unbeknownst to him, was previously removed from a patient's rectum. Dr. Cox's actions to help an uninsured patient earn him a suspension. Louie Anderson has a cameo appearance.
6	6	"My Bad"	Marc Buckland	Gabrielle Allan	October 30, 2001	S105	12.44
Dr. Cox's suspension puts his future at the hospital in doubt. Elliot discovers her patient, Dr. Greenberg, is a psychiatrist, and begins to act like his patient. J.D. has a beautiful but self-absorbed board member as a patient, and he winds up having sex with her after standing up to her. Unfortunately, he finds out that she is Dr. Cox's ex-wife, Jordan (Christa Miller, in her first appearance in the series). J.D. tries to convince Jordan to help Dr. Cox. Jimmie Walker has a cameo appearance.
7	7	"My Super Ego"	Peter Lauer	Mike Schwartz	November 6, 2001	S106	10.90
J.D. relishes being the best intern, but then has to face competition from fellow intern Nick Murdoch (Sean Hayes). Turk confronts his fear of making a mistake in surgery after thinking he has accidentally nicked a patient's colon. Features Cody Estes in his first of six appearances as Young/Child J.D., ending with "My Boss's Free Haircut".
8	8	"My Fifteen Minutes"	Lawrence Trilling	Eric Weinberg	November 15, 2001	S108	17.24
J.D. and Turk save the life of a TV cameraman, which makes them celebrities. Dr. Kelso decides to take advantage of this by using Turk in advertisements for the hospital aimed at the African-American community, with slogans such as "Our MD's have Mad Skills" and "Time to Get an EKG, G". Cox is supposed to write J.D.'s intern evaluation but tells J.D. to do it himself. When J.D. refuses, Dr. Cox reveals that he wanted J.D. to do it so that he could discover his own shortcomings and judge himself.
9	9	"My Day Off"	Elodie Keene	Janae Bakken	November 20, 2001	S107	12.32
J.D. develops appendicitis and sees the hospital from the patients' point of view. Elliot and Turk are his medical and surgical interns respectively.
10	10	"My Nickname"	Matthew Diamond	Bill Lawrence	November 27, 2001	S110	12.25
J.D. and Carla's relationship changes when he starts to have more medical knowledge than she has, and takes offense at her nickname for him ("Bambi"). Elliot treats Jill (Nicole Sullivan), a patient who is just as nervous and neurotic as she is. The Janitor comes up with a new nickname for J.D.
11	11	"My Own Personal Jesus"	Jeff Melman	Debra Fordham	December 11, 2001	S109	10.57
Turk loses his faith in a just God after spending a night on call on Christmas Eve, but regains it after finding the missing pregnant girl Elliot has been searching for. Dr. Cox assigns J.D. to videotape the childbirth of one of Dr. Cox's friends.
12	12	"My Blind Date"	Marc Buckland	Mark Stegemann	January 8, 2002	S112	11.67
J.D. must look after a social worker, Alex Hanson (Elizabeth Bogush), who slipped in the hospital and winds up stuck in an MRI machine. They flirt, but J.D. is reluctant to ask her out without knowing what she looks like. Elliot tries to gain Dr. Cox's favor the way J.D. has. Turk is angry at Carla and she cannot figure out why. Dr. Cox is trying for a zero deaths "perfect game" on his 24-hour ICU shift. Jimmie Walker has a cameo appearance.
13	13	"My Balancing Act"	Michael Spiller	Neil Goldman & Garrett Donovan	January 15, 2002	S113	11.25
J.D.'s relationship with Alex is jeopardized by the amount of time he spends at the hospital. Turk and Carla experience bedroom-related problems. Carrot Top has a cameo appearance.
14	14	"My Drug Buddy"	Michael Spiller	Matt Tarses	January 22, 2002	S111	11.03
When drugs go missing, Elliot suspects a patient who is a former drug addict, but Alex defends him. Elliot tells J.D. that she thinks Alex will hurt him and J.D. accuses her of being jealous. He later tries to confront her about her accusation of the patient. Alex turns out to be the one who took the drugs. She and J.D. part on uncertain terms, and J.D. apologizes to Elliot. They end up in bed. Carla gets a ride from Dr. Kelso. Dr. Cox realizes he has feelings for Carla.
15	15	"My Bed Banter & Beyond"^{†}	Lawrence Trilling	Gabrielle Allan	February 5, 2002	S115	12.63
The episode switches between Elliot and J.D. spending a sex-filled day in bed and the ensuing weeks, where their new relationship breaks down. The hospital staff reveals their feelings to a psychologist.
16	16	"My Heavy Meddle"	Will Mackenzie	Mike Schwartz	February 26, 2002	S116	12.56
J.D. and Elliot are not talking to each other after breaking up, but with Turk's help they resolve some of their issues and get back to better terms. Dr. Cox goes on a destructive rampage and Carla enlists Ted's help on fulfilling a coma patient's wishes. The death of someone close to J.D. prompts even more personal distress amidst the bad breakup with Elliot, and he attempts to play the death off as though it has not hurt him.
17	17	"My Student"	Matthew Diamond	Story by : Mark Stegemann; Teleplay by : Janae Bakken & Debra Fordham	March 5, 2002	S114	10.99
The interns receive their first medical students. J.D.'s is very much like he was at the beginning, Elliot's is a jerk but the son of the CEO of the corporation that owns the hospital, and Turk's is a smart, confident woman (Kelli Williams) to whom Dr. Cox is attracted.
18	18	"My Tuscaloosa Heart"	Lawrence Trilling	Story by : Janae Bakken; Teleplay by : Debra Fordham & Mark Stegemann	March 12, 2002	S117	11.44
J.D. feels guilty when a rude patient, whom he ignored, dies. Carla assures him that it was the patient's terminal cancer, but J.D. is unable to sleep. Dr. Cox is unable to decide between the three women he likes. Elliot and Turk discover a possible new side to Dr. Kelso. The episode title is taken from the song "My Tuscaloosa Heart" performed by Ken Jenkins (Dr. Kelso), which features in the episode.
19	19	"My Old Man"	Adam Bernstein	Matt Tarses	April 9, 2002	S120	10.86
The interns' parents come to visit. Carla deals with the fact that she is just like Turk's mother. Elliot questions why she became a doctor. The episode guest stars R. Lee Ermey as the Janitor's father, Lane Davies and Markie Post as Elliot's parents, Hattie Winston as Turk's mother and John Ritter as J.D.'s father, Sam Dorian.
20	20	"My Way or the Highway"	Adam Bernstein	Eric Weinberg	April 16, 2002	S118	9.32
Due to Turk's competitiveness, Turk convinces J.D.'s patient to decide upon surgery instead of medicine, which angers J.D. Elliot falls for a patient, named Sean (Scott Foley). Dr. Kelso fires two nurses and after Dr. Cox confronts him, he fires "Coffee Nurse".
21	21	"My Sacrificial Clam"	Marc Buckland	Story by : Debra Fordham; Teleplay by : Janae Bakken & Mark Stegemann	April 30, 2002	S119	10.66
J.D. is struck by a needle full of blood contaminated with Hepatitis B. Cleared from infection, he becomes scared of getting sick. Elliot chooses the hospital over her new boyfriend Sean. St. Elsewhere cast members William Daniels, Eric Laneuville, Stephen Furst, and Ed Begley Jr. guest star.
22	22	"My Occurrence"	Lawrence Trilling	Bill Lawrence	May 7, 2002	S122	9.88
Jordan's brother and Dr. Cox's best friend Ben (Brendan Fraser) comes into the hospital after piercing his hand with a nail gun; however, Dr. Cox and J.D. later become worried when his hand will not stop bleeding, with J.D. going into denial about the results of Ben's tests. A series of paperwork bungles nearly has Turk operate on the wrong patient, and has Elliot incorrectly informs Jill (Nicole Sullivan) that she is pregnant.
23	23	"My Hero"	Michael Spiller	Neil Goldman & Garrett Donovan	May 14, 2002	S123	12.50
Ben begins treatment for leukemia, but Dr. Cox has a hard time being supportive because he cares about Ben too much. Turk's ego takes a hit from the attending surgeon Dr. Wen, and Carla and Elliot scathe Dr. Kelso in a personal review. J.D. is very spooked to discover that the Janitor knows far too much about him. The episode guest stars Lela Lee as Bonnie.
24	24	"My Last Day"	Michael Spiller	Gabrielle Allan & Mike Schwartz	May 21, 2002	S121	11.65
The interns realize they have become jaded after working at the hospital for a year, and they decide to treat a patient aggressively. After Dr. Cox chides Jordan for her predictability, she reveals all the main characters' secrets to each other.

=== Notes ===
- ^{†} denotes a "supersized" episode, running an extended length of 25–28 minutes.

== Reception ==
On Rotten Tomatoes, the season has an approval rating of 96% with an average score of 8.3 out of 10 based on 25 reviews. The website's critical consensus reads, "Scrubs is a worthy spiritual successor to M*A*S*H thanks in part to its seamless blend of cheeky comedy and poignant, heartfelt moments."
