= Scrubs season 3 =

Scrubs
- Season 3
- DVD cover
- Showrunner: Bill Lawrence
- No. of episodes: 22

Release
- Original network: NBC
- Original release: October 2, 2003 – May 4, 2004

Season chronology
- ← Previous; Season 2 Next → Season 4

The third season of the American comedy television series Scrubs premiered on NBC on October 2, 2003, and concluded on May 4, 2004, and consists of 22 episodes. This season features many fantasies, as well as features many well-known actors in recurring and guest roles such as Scott Foley, Michael J. Fox, Bellamy Young, Brendan Fraser, and Tara Reid.

The season follows J.D. (Zach Braff), Elliot (Sarah Chalke), and Turk's (Donald Faison) third year at Sacred Heart and second year as residents. As the season opens, Elliot decides to change her image, with some help from the Janitor (Neil Flynn). J.D.'s undeniable crush on Elliot emerges again, but J.D. instead begins a relationship with Jordan's (Christa Miller) sister Danni (Reid), who is also dealing with feelings for her ex. Turk and Carla (Judy Reyes) are engaged and planning their wedding. Turk, along with the Todd (Robert Maschio) and the other surgical residents, deal with the new attending surgeon, Dr. Grace Miller (Young), who dislikes Turk and considers him sexist. Dr. Cox (John C. McGinley) and Jordan are doing well with their relationship and their son Jack, although Dr. Cox develops a schoolboy crush on Dr. Miller. He also struggles with the death of his best friend (Fraser). Elliot gets into a serious relationship with Sean Kelly (Foley) and tries to work out their long-distance relationship while he is in New Zealand for six months.

== Cast and characters ==
=== Main cast ===
- Zach Braff as Dr. John "J.D." Dorian
- Sarah Chalke as Dr. Elliot Reid
- Donald Faison as Dr. Chris Turk
- Neil Flynn as Janitor
- Ken Jenkins as Dr. Bob Kelso
- John C. McGinley as Dr. Perry Cox
- Judy Reyes as Nurse Carla Espinosa

=== Recurring roles ===
- Aloma Wright as Nurse Laverne Roberts
- Robert Maschio as Dr. Todd Quinlan
- Christa Miller as Jordan Sullivan
- Tara Reid as Danni Sullivan
- Scott Foley as Sean Kelly
- Sam Lloyd as Ted Buckland
- Johnny Kastl as Dr. Doug Murphy
- Bellamy Young as Dr. Grace Miller
- Martin Klebba as Randall Winston

=== Guest stars ===
- Freddy Rodriguez as Marco Espinosa
- Michael J. Fox as Dr. Kevin Casey
- Barry Bostwick as Mr. Randolph
- Néstor Carbonell as Dr. Ron Ramirez
- Tom Cavanagh as Dan Dorian
- Mike Starr as Barry Iverson
- Alexander Chaplin as Sam Thompson
- Embeth Davidtz as Maddie
- Brendan Fraser as Ben Sullivan
- Richard Kind as Harvey Corman
- Christopher Meloni as Dr. Dave Norris
- Nicole Sullivan as Jill Tracy
- George Takei as Priest
- The Polyphonic Spree as themselves
- The Blanks as the Worthless Peons

== Production ==
Rich Eustis was hired as a consultant for this season. In addition, Justin Spitzer wrote a spec script that was made into an episode.

=== Writing staff ===
- Bill Lawrence – executive producer/head writer
- Eric Weinberg – co-executive producer
- Matt Tarses – co-executive producer
- Tim Hobert – co-executive producer
- Neil Goldman and Garrett Donovan – supervising producers
- Gabrielle Allan – supervising producer
- Mike Schwartz – co-producer
- Debra Fordham – executive story editor
- Mark Stegemann – executive story editor
- Janae Bakken – executive story editor
- Angela Nissel – story editor
- Rich Eustis – consultant

=== Production staff ===
- Bill Lawrence – executive producer/showrunner
- Randall Winston – producer
- Liz Newman – co-producer
- Danny Rose – associate producer

=== Directors ===
Includes directors who directed 2 or more episodes, or directors who are part of the cast and crew

- Michael Spiller (3 episodes)
- Chris Koch (3 episodes)
- Bill Lawrence (2 episodes)
- Ken Whittingham (2 episodes)
- Adam Bernstein (2 episodes)
- Gail Mancuso (2 episodes)
- Craig Zisk (2 episodes)
- Randall Winston (producer) (1 episode)
- Richard Alexander Wells (assistant director) (1 episode)
- John Inwood (director of photography) (1 episode)

== Episodes ==
"My Dirty Secret" was originally scheduled to be broadcast on October 16, 2003. However, the entire NBC lineup was pulled due to the Major League Baseball 2003 American League Championship Series on Fox going to a 7th game. The other NBC shows from that night (Friends, ER, and Will & Grace) all shifted their scheduled episodes to the following week. For reasons unknown, this episode was not shifted to the following week, and was broadcast out of order (with some small edits in an attempt to hide the inconsistencies, such as Sean being present, and J.D. being single). This episode was broadcast in its original form and original order in some international markets. Syndication also uses the original version.

Scrubs season 3 episodes
No. overall	No. in season	Title	Directed by	Written by	Original release date	Prod. code	U.S. viewers (millions)
47	1	"My Own American Girl"	Bill Lawrence	Bill Lawrence	October 2, 2003	301	17.15
J.D., Turk, and Carla work together to diagnose one of J.D.'s patients. Elliot, frustrated that everyone walks all over her and desperately needing to change her bad luck streak, acts on some advice from the Janitor and gets a makeover.
48	2	"My Journey"	Michael Spiller	Tim Hobert	October 9, 2003	302	15.03
Turk and Carla set the date for their wedding. J.D. is worried about losing his close friendship with Turk and asks him out on a "man date." Elliot gets back together with her ex-boyfriend Sean, but the relationship has a rocky start. Carla obsesses over whose urine is in an unmarked container left at the nurses' station.
49	3	"My White Whale"	Michael Spiller	Eric Weinberg	October 23, 2003	304	14.08
Jordan and Dr. Cox worry about Jack's slight cough and try to get him seen by the hospital's own pediatrician, Dr. Dave Norris (Christopher Meloni), who is as obnoxious as Dr. Cox. The residents get their own interns and the inevitable problems that come with them: Turk is too heavy-handed, J.D. fails to assert his authority, and Elliot continues to deal with her own insecurities. J.D. reluctantly accepts help from Sean.
50	4	"My Lucky Night"^{†}	John Inwood	Neil Goldman & Garrett Donovan	October 30, 2003	305	11.94
J.D. distracts the Janitor and Troy the Cafeteria Guy with a riddle. Dr. Cox and Dr. Jeffrey Steadman (Matt Winston) compete for the residency director position. Carla gets to work with Turk when she covers for one of the surgical nurses; Turk is annoyed at first but then appreciative when Dr. Wen (Charles Chun) says it was as though he had a lucky charm in the room with him. Sean and Elliot's relationship hits rocky ground; J.D. seizes the opportunity to admit his hidden feelings for her.
51	5	"My Brother, Where Art Thou?"	Marc Buckland	Mike Schwartz	November 6, 2003	306	11.33
J.D's brother Dan (Tom Cavanagh) visits again and blames Dr. Cox for making J.D. cynical. After warning hospital staff against taking other jobs, Dr. Kelso catches Elliot and Carla moonlighting at an animal hospital.
52	6	"My Advice to You"	Gail Mancuso	Debra Fordham	November 13, 2003	307	12.64
Carla's brother Marco (Freddy Rodriguez) visits and does his best to aggravate Turk. Dr. Cox and Dr. Kelso differ in their opinions over patient care, and Dr. Cox is surprised to find that J.D. is taking Dr. Kelso's advice. J.D. is interested in Danni (Tara Reid), a girl who seems sweet, if a little wacky (she has an active inner monologue and speaks random thoughts aloud). But his delight is quashed when he discovers she is Jordan's sister.
53	7	"My Fifteen Seconds"	Ken Whittingham	Mark Stegemann	November 20, 2003	308	12.83
J.D. and Danni hook up, prompting Dr. Cox to reveal to Danni that J.D. slept with Jordan. Meanwhile, Dr. Cox and J.D. deal with an extremely annoying patient, Jill Tracy (Nicole Sullivan), and almost miss something extremely important because they spend so little time with their patients. Dr. Kelso goes temporarily deaf after using cheap stethoscopes, and Carla's medical advice to Elliot provokes tension between them. Features a cameo appearance by Erik Estrada.
54	8	"My Friend the Doctor"	Ken Whittingham	Gabrielle Allan	December 4, 2003	309	12.18
When Dr. Cox hurts his back showing off in front of Turk, he begins to realize he is not as young as he used to be. J.D. is not impressed with the false personalities the Janitor uses on the rest of the staff, until he recognizes him playing a transit policeman in The Fugitive (in which Neil Flynn did appear) and concludes that the Janitor is an actor.
55	9	"My Dirty Secret"	Chris Koch	Matt Tarses	December 11, 2003	303	11.09
After accidentally giving a patient an orgasm during a pelvic examination, Elliot admits she has a problem with the clinical terms for genitalia. Carla attempts to help Elliot get over her fear of "dirty words," but realizes she may be too assertive for her own good. Dr. Cox is moved by the relationship between a prostate cancer patient, Mr. Randolph (Barry Bostwick), and his wife. J.D gives advice to Dr. Cox about his relationship with Jordan and his son, but when it does not pan out, he is subject to Dr. Cox's revenge.
56	10	"My Rule of Thumb"	Craig Zisk	Janae Bakken	January 22, 2004	310	11.41
Elliot and Carla get arrested looking for a gigolo for a terminally ill patient who wants to lose her virginity before she dies. Danni is uncomfortable after walking in on Jordan and Dr. Cox having sex and asks J.D. if she can stay at his place. J.D. starts having second thoughts almost immediately after initially agreeing. Dr. Cox and Turk clash over a friend of Dr. Cox's who needs a liver transplant, and Turk wins. Ted has sex with the terminally ill patient.
57	11	"My Clean Break"	Chris Koch	Angela Nissel	February 3, 2004	311	9.23
Nervous about Danni's plans to move in with him, J.D. decides he needs to break up with her — only he has never actually dumped anyone before. The Janitor starts flirting with Elliot again. Dr. Cox realizes that he is no longer frightening to his residents, and therefore may have lost control over them.
58	12	"My Catalyst"^{†}	Michael Spiller	Bill Lawrence	February 10, 2004	316	11.04
Dr. Kevin Casey (Michael J. Fox), a skilled surgeon who has a long history with Dr. Cox and who suffers from crippling obsessive–compulsive disorder (OCD), imparts wisdom to everyone at Sacred Heart. Meanwhile, Ted once again contemplates suicide.
59	13	"My Porcelain God"^{†}	Adam Bernstein	Tim Hobert & Eric Weinberg	February 17, 2004	317	8.15
Dr. Casey (Michael J. Fox) and J.D discover the toilet the Janitor installed on the roof, which earns the name "epiphany toilet" after every Sacred Heart staff member finds a solution to a problem or a revelation after using it. Dr. Kelso closes down an entire wing of the hospital to save money; Dr. Cox and Carla fight back by using his own office as a patient room. Turk asks J.D. to be his best man, but J.D. is hurt to discover that he was not Turk's first choice. Noticing how helpful Dr. Casey has been to her fellow staff, Elliot seeks advice from him on intubation after she botches the procedure.
60	14	"My Screw Up"	Chris Koch	Neil Goldman & Garrett Donovan	February 24, 2004	315	8.21
Jordan's siblings, Danni (Tara Reid) and Ben (Brendan Fraser), visit to celebrate Jack's first birthday. Carla tells Turk she will only take his last name if he has his mole removed. Dr. Cox is dismayed to learn that Ben has not been to a doctor for a follow up since his remission. J.D. is swamped and worried about patient Mr. Taylor, who has an irregular heartbeat. When J.D.'s patient goes into cardiac arrest and dies, Dr. Cox angrily blames him and excuses him from his duties. This episode received an Emmy nomination for Outstanding Writing in a Comedy Series.
61	15	"My Tormented Mentor"	Craig Zisk	Gabrielle Allan	March 2, 2004	314	8.19
Dr. Cox is struggling to recover from Ben's death and refuses J.D.'s efforts to comfort him; meanwhile, Jordan's self-absorbed friends, Maddie (Embeth Davidtz) and Allison (Julie Warner) are staying with Jordan to comfort her. Carla scolds the Todd, Dr. Kelso and Dr. Cox about sexual harassment, and the new female attending surgeon, Dr. Grace Miller (Bellamy Young), brings up the issue of sexism in the surgical wing.
62	16	"My Butterfly"	Henry Chan	Justin Spitzer	March 16, 2004	312	6.60
This episode explores a number of interrelated events, which illustrate the relationships among the Sacred Heart staff. The title comes from a single butterfly interacting with numerous objects and people, in a reference to the philosophical concept of the butterfly effect.
63	17	"My Moment of Un-Truth"	Gail Mancuso	Rich Eustis	March 30, 2004	313	9.21
Carla has dinner with a former crush and asks J.D. not to tell Turk. Elliot deals with a patient, Mr. Thompson (Alexander Chaplin), who is adamant about not taking drugs; to her surprise, Dr. Cox insists he is a drug addict who will eventually weasel drugs out of her. The Janitor attempts to trick J.D. and Turk into believing he has a twin brother.
64	18	"His Story II"	Jason Ensler	Mark Stegemann	April 6, 2004	318	8.02
This episode is narrated from Turk's, rather than J.D.'s, viewpoint. Turk delays mailing out the wedding invitations, as it is the point of no return for getting married. During surgery, Turk makes a mistake that causes irreparable nerve damage to a young concert pianist, to whom he cannot admit his mistake. J.D. covers Elliot's stint as a hospital clown; the Janitor becomes his sidekick. Elliot realizes just how good a friend J.D. has been to her and sleeps with him just before Sean comes back into town.
65	19	"My Choosiest Choice of All"	Adam Bernstein	Mike Schwartz	April 20, 2004	319	8.01
In an attempt to make Elliot jealous and angry, J.D. gets back together with Danni, who is a different person now that she has stopped acting the person she thought J.D. wanted her to be. Dr. Cox realizes he has a crush on Dr. Miller, and Jordan picks up on it immediately. Turk and Carla encourage the Janitor to accept his promotion to security guard, but he finds he dislikes having to play by Dr. Kelso's rules. After Sean confronts J.D. and asks him if anything happened between him and Elliot, J.D. must choose to either tell him the truth, or keep it a secret.
66	20	"My Fault"	Richard Alexander Wells	Debra Fordham	April 22, 2004	320	13.56
J.D. and Danni break up, as neither one really cared about the other; Sean and Elliot plan to move in together. Carla is anxious about the last-minute details for her wedding, now just a few weeks away. Dr. Cox bets Dr. Kelso that no healthy patients will sign up for the full body CAT scans, not expecting Mr. Corman the hypochondriac (Richard Kind) to return. J.D. finally admits his feelings to Elliot, causing her to break up with Sean, only to realize his feelings were based on his coveting what he did not have.
67	21	"My Self-Examination"	Randall Winston	Janae Bakken	April 27, 2004	321	9.21
Marco arrives for the wedding rehearsal and offers Turk advice in writing his own wedding vows, as Carla wanted. After asking Danni and her new partner for advice, J.D. resigns himself to a relationship with Elliot, even if he does not love her. Jordan insists that she and Dr. Cox stop fighting; frustrated and needing to fight with someone, he antagonizes the Janitor, much to his detriment. At the rehearsal, moved by Turk's improvised vows, J.D. finally admits to Elliot that he does not love her. Features a cameo appearance by Larry Thomas (the Soup Nazi from Seinfeld).
68	22	"My Best Friend's Wedding"	Bill Lawrence	Tim Hobert & Eric Weinberg	May 4, 2004	322	11.11
On the day of Turk and Carla's wedding, Turk is delayed in surgery; he is so late for the wedding that the ceremony is canceled, but the reception is held regardless. Danni gets drunk and wreaks havoc. Guilty for having broken Elliot's heart, J.D. finds Sean and tries to convince him to take Elliot back, but to no avail. Before leaving for their honeymoon, Turk and Carla return to the hospital to check on a patient, who happens to be a priest, and ask him to marry them. Features a cameo appearance by George Takei.

=== Notes ===
- ^{†} denotes a "supersized" episode, running an extended length of 25–28 minutes.
