= My Princess =

- Scrubs episode
- Episode no.: Season 7 Episode 11
- Directed by: Zach Braff
- Written by: Mark Stegemann
- Production code: 709
- Original air date: May 8, 2008

Guest appearances
- Johnny Kastl as Dr. Doug Murphy; Sam Lloyd as Ted Buckland; Robert Maschio as Dr. Todd Quinlan; Christa Miller as Jordan Sullivan; Travis Schuldt as Keith Dudemeister; Aloma Wright as Nurse Shirley; Katie Gill as Marian; Tyler Poelle as Boon; Lindsay Ravage as Debbie

Episode chronology
← Previous "My Waste of Time"	Next → "My Jerks"
- Scrubs season 7

"My Princess" is the season seven finale and the 150th overall episode of the American television sitcom Scrubs. It was written by Mark Stegemann and directed by series main star Zach Braff. It was originally aired on May 8, 2008 on NBC, and was the last episode of the series to air on NBC before the series moved to ABC. Although produced as episode 9, the episode was rearranged to be the season finale due to the season being cut short because of the 2007–2008 Writers Guild of America strike.

== Plot ==
Dr. Kelso, to try to prevent the staff from making mistakes due to tiredness that will make the hospital liable and open for lawsuits, says that anyone caught working past their shifts will be suspended. Dr. Cox recounts this tough day at the hospital to his son through an imaginative fairy tale. When Princess Elliot's handmaiden, i.e. one of Elliot Reid's patients, falls ill at the hands of an unknown monster, the Princess summons the Village Idiot, J.D., to help rescue her. But with the Dark Lord Oslek (Dr. Kelso) standing in their way, the duo can't do it alone. The Prince (Keith) is still in love with the Princess and tries to win her back, to no avail.

The Giant (Janitor) keeps an eye out for the heroes while the two-headed Turla, a combination of Turk and Carla, lends some magic, but it's the brave knight in shining armor (the storyteller, Dr. Cox) that lends them the knowledge that may save the day. However, with Dr. Kelso's new rules, the staff of Sacred Heart may not have time to figure out how to slay the monster. The Idiot and the Princess admit they both tried to kiss each other as they were "both running away from something".

In the end, J.D. concludes the woman has Wilson's disease and needs a new liver. Dr. Cox tells his son that the maiden lived, but when he exits the room Jordan asks him whether or not she really survived. He suggests that she didn't, saying, "that's the way I'm telling it."

== Continuity ==
- After saying in an earlier episode that he has stress-induced dyslexia, Ted refers to Dr. Kelso as Dr. Oslek, the name Dr. Cox gives the Dark Lord.
- When Boon and Debbie are playing "Diagnosis Jeopardy", you can hear Boon call her "Slaggy", referencing the episode, "His Story IV", when Dr. Kelso decides to call her "Slagathor".
- In an earlier episode Dr. Kelso retires from his position of Chief of Medicine, but in "My Princess" he still holds the position.
- Earlier in the season J.D.'s brother, Dan, gives J.D. a car, however in the episode he's riding his donkey "Sasha" the same name he gave his scooter, suggesting that JD hasn't received the car yet.

== Production details ==
"My Princess" concluded the seventh season of Scrubs on NBC. Directed by series star Zach Braff, the episode is a homage to The Princess Bride, and features costumes and location work, including horses and a castle. According to set dresser Patrick Bolton, the village design itself (and to an extent the costume design) was a homage to Monty Python and the Holy Grail. The village features several design aspects made famous by Monty Python, such as the Dead Collector.

Series creator Bill Lawrence describes the episode as a personal effort for the cast and crew, comparable to earlier themed episodes such as "My Musical" and "My Life in Four Cameras". According to Lawrence, "Even now, after seven years, we try to do one show that we spend way too much money and time on ... We're ultimately just making ourselves happy." Braff describes the episode as both the most epic, and the most expensive episode so far, saying it includes "monsters, potions, evil wizards, giants, hunchbacks, gnomes – like World of Warcraft, but Scrubs."

A teaser for the episode posted on NBC's website featured Ted Buckland dressed as a hunchback eating a squirrel.

=== Early release in Ireland ===
This episode was broadcast in Ireland on May 1, 2008, one week ahead of the scheduled premiere in the United States. The error occurred due to the Irish network broadcasting Scrubs based on the production order, under which "My Princess" was episode nine of season seven, rather than the final air order under which "My Dumb Luck" was ninth and "My Princess" was bumped to the 11th slot. This also affects the continuity of the show, because Dr. Kelso is still Chief of Medicine in this episode.

== Inhabitants of Sacred Heartia ==
- Village Idiot – J.D.
- Princess – Elliot
- Turla – Turk and Carla
- Prince – Keith
- Knight – Dr. Cox
- Irritable Townswoman of Color – Nurse Shirley
- Giant – Janitor
- Hunchback – Ted
- Dark Lord – Dr. Kelso
- Dark Lord's prisoner – Doug
- Potion Shoppe owner – Franklyn
- Fairy Toddsomething – The Todd
- Wood nymphs – Boone and Debbie
- Scary old lady – Jordan

== Cultural references ==
- Dr. Cox's comment of "My name is Percival Cox. You're killing my friend. Prepare to die", is a reference to the famous line from The Princess Bride: "Hello. My name is Inigo Montoya. You killed my father. Prepare to die!"
