= Our Role Models =

- Scrubs episode
- Episode no.: Season 9 Episode 3
- Directed by: Gail Mancuso
- Written by: Steven Cragg; Brian Bradley
- Production code: 903
- Original air date: December 8, 2009

Guest appearances
- Nicky Whelan as Maya; Brian Bradley as Dr. Tom Bradley; Audrey Kearns as Meghan Maroney; Kurt Ross as Ryan Maroney; Windell D. Middlebrooks as Cpt. Melvis Duncook; Steven Cragg as Lt. Frank Underhill; Cece Antoinette as Mrs. Duncan

Episode chronology
← Previous "Our Drunk Friend"	Next → "Our Histories"
- Scrubs season 9

"Our Role Models" is the third episode of the ninth season and the 172nd overall episode of the American television sitcom Scrubs. Written by Steven Gragg and Brian Bradley and directed by Gail Mancuso, it originally aired on ABC on December 8, 2009.

In 2026, the episode and the season as a whole was rendered non-canon by the revival of Scrubs, which picks up sixteen years after the events of the eighth season.

== Plot ==
As J.D. and Turk talk in a hall of New Sacred Heart, Dr. Cox calls them over so he can give a present to Drew - a pink shirt with #1 printed on the front. J.D. gets insanely jealous but Drew is still mad that Cox is aggressively taking an interest in him. Later, in class, Drew answers all of the difficult questions Cox asks. Cole later tells Drew to watch himself because he wants to be #1 in the class. During rounds, Cox spots a coding patient. He asks Drew to handle it but Drew cripples under pressure and storms off. J.D. steps in to help. Later, at the bar, Drew approaches Cox, who ignores him and hurls a general insult at people who've wasted his time. Upset, Drew asks J.D. for help but J.D. tells him that once set in his ways, Cox is impossible to convince to change his mind. Turk overhears this and makes J.D. talk to Cox nonetheless. At the Owlcat's football game, J.D. tells Cox that it has taken him a long time to find someone he could believe in, and that he shouldn't throw it away after one mistake. Cox takes his advice and calls on Drew during his next lecture, and informs him that he has to wear the shirt the next day. J.D. smiles, but is angered when Cox pats Drew on the back.

After waking up next to Cole, Lucy attends Cox's lecture, where she freezes when he asks her a question. She then meets with J.D. in his favorite tree and he informs her that she should start looking for a new mentor since he is leaving soon. Wanting to find a female mentor, Lucy asks Denise. Denise initially refuses to let her shadow her, but when she gets a patient, Mrs. Maroney, with a similar personality to Lucy's, Denise asks Lucy to take care of her while Denise takes care of her son. Denise grows fond of the boy, but when she finds out that Mrs. Maroney is terminally ill, she abandons him. Denise asks Lucy to talk to the boy and make sure he is all right, but before she can, Denise steps in herself and comforts him, giving him her cell phone number. Denise then gives Lucy permission to shadow her.

== Reception ==
5.44 million American viewers watched this episode, the highest viewed episode of the ninth season. The episode received a 2.3/6 rating/share among adults 18-49 and placed ninth for the night. TV Fanatic called this episode "a good episode. Luckily, the two new breakout stars of the new Scrubs cast, Denise and Drew are doing a great job. We loved the A story with Lucy shadowing Denise, while the former ending up teaching the latter to soften up a little." Joel Keller of TV Squad said he "felt odd watching this episode. By all objective measures, it was a good episode; funny, good story, lots of glimpses into the characters' personalities. But, as in the first two episodes, most of the good stuff involved the old cast, mainly Zach Braff. And, since this is supposed to work more as a transition to a new show than more of the old show, this trend is getting me worried." IGN gave this episode an 8 out of 10 rating, calling the pairing of Dr. Mahoney and Lucy interesting.
