= Aseem Batra =

American television director

- Born: Ohio, U.S.
- Occupations: Television director; producer; actress
- Notable work: Scrubs (2006–2009, 2026); The Cleveland Show (2009–2013); I Feel Bad (2018)

Aseem Batra is an American television director, producer and actress.

== Biography ==
Born in Ohio to Punjabi immigrants from India, she moved to rural Georgia at the age of three and Orange County, California at twelve. She was a communications and theater double major at the University of California, San Diego before going to graduate school for communications management at the University of Southern California.

Batra was a producer and writer on Scrubs, where she also played the character Josephine. In 2009, she began writing and producing on The Cleveland Show. Mike Henry, commenting on being a white man voicing the African American Cleveland Brown, noted how the character's stereotypical redneck neighbors were voiced by black actor Kevin Michael Richardson and Batra. As a producer, Batra was part of the nomination of the episode "Murray Christmas" for Primetime Emmy Award for Outstanding Animated Program at the 63rd Primetime Emmy Awards.

In February 2015, it was announced that Batra would write a "politically incorrect" sitcom pilot for NBC alongside the Russo brothers, with whom she had previously worked on Animal Practice and an unfinished semi-autobiographical comedy. Three years later, the same network picked up an untitled project written by Batra and executive produced alongside Amy Poehler; it aired in September as I Feel Bad, which ran for a single, 13-episode season.
