= My Hero (Scrubs) =

- Scrubs episode
- Episode no.: Season 1 Episode 23
- Directed by: Michael Spiller
- Written by: Neil Goldman; Garrett Donovan
- Production code: S123
- Original air date: May 14, 2002

Guest appearances
- Sam Lloyd as Ted Buckland; Robert Maschio as Todd Quinlan; Christa Miller as Jordan Sullivan; Brendan Fraser as Ben Sullivan; Aloma Wright as Nurse Laverne Roberts; George Miserlis as Crispin; Bob Clendenin as Dr. Zeltzer; Charles Chun as Dr. Wen; Philip McNiven as Roy; Paul Perry as Randall; Lela Lee as Bonnie

Episode chronology
← Previous "My Occurrence"	Next → "My Last Day"

"My Hero" is the 23rd episode of the American sitcom Scrubs. It originally aired on May 14, 2002, on NBC.

== Synopsis ==
Ben takes his leukemia diagnosis pretty well, much better than Jordan and J.D. Dr. Cox tells Ben, Jordan and J.D. that they can beat the cancer, earning J.D.'s hero worship. Later, Dr. Zeltzer wants to start Ben on chemotherapy straight away, but Ben doesn't want to, unhappy that Dr. Cox was not there at the first session. In fact, Dr. Cox bails from the entire situation. J.D. confronts Cox, who admits he is afraid of Ben dying, and confronts J.D. about his fear of being self-reliant for the first time. Inspired, J.D. makes his way to Ben's room, only to leave immediately when he sees Dr. Cox sitting with Ben. Fortunately, Ben's cancer goes into remission.

Turk is upset that he did not get to perform an important surgery. Bonnie, Turk's competitive colleague, has the surgery instead. Turk confronts Dr. Wen about the procedure, implying that Bonnie only got the surgery because both she and Wen are Asian. Later, Turk apologizes for his earlier behaviour and Dr. Wen accepts, but tells Turk that Todd is the best surgical intern at the hospital, due his ability to get into the "moment" and not to worry about the next move. Turk is initially upset, but eventually tells Dr. Wen that he is not worried about who is the best surgical intern right now, as he is confident he will one day be the best.

== Production ==
This is the first episode where J.D. uses the phrase "Eagle!" It became show's running gag. "Speed Racer" and "Underdog" theme songs, performed by Ted's Band (The Blanks) are part of the episode, with "AV Club saying that "Ted's band's rendition of the Underdog theme song is one of the show's finest musical moments". "Fresh Feeling" by the Eels and "Joy and Pain" arrangement by Rob Base and DJ E-Z Rock are also featured.

== Reception ==
The A.V. Club stated that the episode "tremendous showcase for John C. McGinley, who gets to reveal more of the vulnerability that we saw from Perry [before]" and called "My Hero" "McGinley's episode". It also mentions that the "goal of the episode is to get each character into a complicated emotional space, nicely captured by the split-screen montage of all of the characters moving in a synchronized fashion" BuzzFeed put the episode on fifth place in top 20 Scrubs episodes, saying that "This episode yet again gives us a thoughtful look at Dr. Cox's character, especially at how he handles bad news by completely avoiding it". CinemaBlend put the episode at position four of best Scrubs episodes, noting that episode ""My Hero" continues the narrative thread about the relationship shared by Dr. Cox and Ben".

Paste says that with show's ending "we're brought back to classic Scrubs comedy with a joke and a happy ending". Uproxx put this episode on 8th place of best Scrubs episodes of all time and writes that "this is the episode that really elevates Dr. Cox into a full-fledged character on Scrubs instead of a ranting, abusive antagonist".
