= My Life in Four Cameras =

- Scrubs episode
- Episode no.: Season 4 Episode 17
- Directed by: Adam Bernstein
- Written by: Debra Fordham
- Production code: 417
- Original air date: February 15, 2005

Guest appearances
- Clay Aiken as Kenny; Ken Lerner as Mr. James; Deonté Gordon as Figsack; Jeremy Howard as Fat Frank; Dave Martel as Dave Martel; Chrystee Pharris-Larkins as Kylie

Episode chronology
← Previous "My Quarantine"	Next → "My Roommates"
- Scrubs season 4

"My Life in Four Cameras" is the seventeenth episode of the fourth season and 85th overall episode of the American television sitcom Scrubs. Written by Debra Fordham and directed Adam Bernstein, it originally aired on February 15, 2005 on NBC.

== Plot ==
This episode is an homage to the traditional multi-camera sitcom, and, specifically, Cheers (which also aired on NBC). Unlike traditional sitcoms, Scrubs uses a single camera setup, no laugh track, and is not filmed before a live studio audience. During an extended dream sequence, J.D. imagines what his life would be like if it were a sitcom. This sequence was actually filmed in a multi-camera setup with a laugh track and studio audience; as well as featuring low-cut outfits for the female characters, a less realistic hospital set, brighter lighting, broader humor, a fairly contrived plot, and a guest star named Kenny (Clay Aiken). In addition, a featured patient in the episode is fictional Cheers writer Charles James, a combination of Cheers' three creators James Burrows, Glen Charles, and Les Charles. The episode makes repeated comments about these "traditional" sitcoms.

As the episode opens, Carla is trying to compete with the idea of Kylie and J.D.'s relationship, but Turk isn't reciprocating her attempts. A new E. coli scare on the news then results in a huge crowd of people coming to a hospital worried that they are infected.

J.D. and Turk meet a famous writer for Cheers. It turns out he has lung cancer. In the sitcom fantasy, he lives following the discovery that his chart was mixed up with that of another patient with a similar name ("This chart isn't for Charles James, it's for James Charles! And who cares about him, he’s anti-Semitic"). While J.D. is saying aloud his thoughts and what he's learned, the sitcom writer faints, to which J.D. responds that this is wrong. The show returns to its normal setting, where the sitcom writer has died.

Meanwhile, Kelso needs to do some budget cuts, and he figures out he has to fire someone. Dr. Cox bets that he can do it without firing anyone, but after many hours of working, he finds that it is inevitable. The next day at lunch, Janitor points out all the cafeteria workers Dr. Cox shouldn't fire. Finally, he points out Kenny, who pours the coffee; he happens to be the newest cafeteria worker. When the show switches to "JD’s Sitcom Fantasy", a talent show happens at the hospital (with the prize being exactly the same amount that the hospital needs to save). Everyone tries their best, J.D. doing his famous "World's most giant Doctor" act, when finally Kenny sings and wins the money. However, when the sitcom fantasy ends, Dr. Cox does have to fire Kenny for real. Carla and Turk sit down to work out their problems in their relationship. And J.D. sits down at home to watch a sitcom.

== Production details ==
The version of the Cheers theme song performed by Colin Hay in the original airing of this episode has been removed from subsequent airings and is not heard in the DVD release due to copyright laws.

According to commentaries, many of the male cast "suggested" to Bill Lawrence that the scantily-clad nurses should remain in the series. One of models portraying these scantily-clad nurses was sexually harassed by series writer and accused serial rapist Eric Weinberg.

== Critical reception ==
Brian Ford Sullivan of thefutoncritic.com listed the episode as one of the top 50 television episodes of 2005.
