= Randall Winston =

American television director

Randall Keenan Winston
- Citizenship: American
- Education: Ohio University (1989)
- Occupations: Television producer, director
- Years active: 1990–present
- Known for: Spin City, Scrubs, Cougar Town, Shrinking
- Notable work: Scrubs, Spin City

Randall Keenan Winston is a television producer and director best known for his work on Spin City and Scrubs.

== Career ==
He has been an associate producer on such shows as Champs, Day By Day, Brooklyn Bridge and Spin City. He produced Scrubs, and was co-nominated with Bill Lawrence in 2004 for Danny Thomas Producer of the Year by the Producers Guild of America. He has twice been Emmy nominated. He produced the pilots Nobody's Watching and Confessions of a Dog. He has also directed two episodes of Scrubs, "My Self-Examination" and "My Buddy's Booty," and has appeared in episodes of the show as Leonard the security guard and Death. He went on to be a producer on Lawrence's show Cougar Town. For the ninth season of Scrubs he acted as co-executive producer.

== Personal life ==
He grew up in Harvey, Illinois, and graduated from Ohio University in 1989. He is good friends with Scrubs creator and Spin City co-creator Bill Lawrence, with whom he has worked on most of his projects. Lawrence says his and Winston's friendship was the inspiration for the friendship of J.D. and Turk on Scrubs and Stuart and Carter on Spin City. The character Randall Winston on Spin City was named after him, as was the character Randall, played by Martin Klebba, on Scrubs. He is the inspiration for the character of Carter Heywood on Spin City.

He is openly gay and lives with his partner in Los Angeles.

He is a member of the board of the Lupus Foundation of America.

In September 2026, Mindy Tessa McKoin, a former second assistant director of Shrinking filed a lawsuit against him for the sexual abuse against her during the wrap party of the series' second season in July 2024.

== Filmography ==
=== Producer ===
- Champs (Associate Producer) (1996) (3 episodes)
- Spin City (Associate Producer) (1996–2000) (100 episodes)
- Scrubs (Producer, Co-Executive Producer, Co-Producer, Executive Producer) (2001–2010, 2026) (191 episodes)
- Confessions of a Dog (Producer) (2005) (TV movie)
- Nobody's Watching (Producer) (2006) (TV movie)
- Cavemen (2007) (Producer) (Episode: "Her Embarrassed of Cavemen")
- Night Life (Producer) (2008) (TV movie)
- Cougar Town (Co-Executive Producer, Producer, Executive Producer) (2009–2015) (87 episodes)
- Ground Floor (Co-Executive Producer, Producer, Executive Producer) (2013–2015) (20 episodes)
- Undateable (Co-Executive Producer, Executive Producer) (2014–2015) (23 episodes)
- The Sixth Lead (Executive Producer) (2015) (4 episodes) (miniseries)
- Rush Hour (Co-Executive Producer, Consulting Producer) (2016) (13 episodes)
- Nobodies (Co-Executive Producer) (2017–2018) (24 episodes)
- Grace and Frankie (Co-Executive Producer) (2018) (13 episodes)
- Roseanne (Co-Executive Producer) (2018) (9 episodes)
- Mixed-ish (Executive Producer) (2019–2021) (36 episodes)
- American Housewife (Executive Producer) (2020–2021) (13 episodes)
- Shrinking (Executive Producer) (2023–present) (33 episodes)

=== Director ===
- Scrubs (2004–2006, 2026) (5 episodes)
- Cougar Town (2013) (Episode: "The Criminal Kind")
- Grace and Frankie (2018–2019) (2 episodes)
- American Housewife (2020–2021) (3 episodes)
- Home Economics (2021) (3 episodes)
- Head of the Class (2021) (Episode: "The Stare-Master")
- American Auto (2022) (Episode: "Recall")
- Shrinking (2023–present) (12 episodes)
- St. Denis Medical (2025) (Episode: "Anything to Push Zaluva")

=== Other work ===
- American Dreamer (Assistant to Producers) (1990)
- Brooklyn Bridge (Post-Production Coordinator) (1993) (Episode: "In a Family Way")
- Platypus Man (Post-Production Supervisor) (1995) (13 episodes)
- Scrubs (Actor) (Leonard the Security Guard/Death) (2001–2009) (14 episodes)
- Cougar Town (Consultant) (2014) (13 episodes)
