= Scrubs (2001 TV series) =

American medical sitcom

- Genre: Medical sitcom
- Created by: Bill Lawrence
- Showrunners: Bill Lawrence; Josh Bycel
- Starring: Zach Braff; Sarah Chalke; Donald Faison; Ken Jenkins; John C. McGinley; Judy Reyes; Neil Flynn; Eliza Coupe; Kerry Bishé; Michael Mosley; Dave Franco
- Narrated by: Zach Braff; Kerry Bishé
- Theme music composer: Chad Fischer; Chris Link; Tim Bright
- Opening theme: "Superman" by Lazlo Bane (seasons 1–8); "Superman" by WAZ (season 9)
- Composer: Jan Stevens
- Country of origin: United States
- Original language: English
- No. of seasons: 9
- No. of episodes: 182 (list of episodes)

Production
- Executive producers: Bill Lawrence; Neil Goldman; Garrett Donovan; Tim Hobert; Tad Quill; Bill Callahan; Zach Braff; Josh Bycel; Jonathan Groff
- Camera setup: Single-camera
- Running time: 20–23 minutes
- Production companies: Doozer; ABC Studios (seasons 1–9) (Note: Credited as Touchstone Television for the first six seasons.)

Original release
- Network: NBC
- Release: October 2, 2001 – May 8, 2008
- Network: ABC
- Release: January 6, 2009 – March 17, 2010

Related
- Scrubs (2026–present)

Scrubs (stylized as [scrubs]) is an American medical sitcom created by Bill Lawrence. The series follows the lives of employees at the fictional Sacred Heart Hospital, which is a teaching hospital. The title is a play on surgical scrubs and a term for a low-ranking person because at the beginning of the series, most of the main characters are medical interns.

The series is noted for its fast-paced slapstick and surreal vignettes presented mostly as the daydreams of the central character and narrator, John "J.D." Dorian, played by Zach Braff. The main cast for seasons one through eight consisted of Braff, Sarah Chalke, Donald Faison, Ken Jenkins, John C. McGinley, and Judy Reyes. Recurring cast member Neil Flynn joined the main cast in season two. The series featured multiple guest appearances by film actors, such as Brendan Fraser, Heather Graham, Michael J. Fox, and Colin Farrell.

Scrubs aired in its original format between October 2001 and May 2009—switching from its original network NBC to ABC in January 2009—with the season eight episodes "My Finale" conceived and filmed as a series finale. The ninth season, which aired on ABC between December 2009 and March 2010, moved the setting to a medical school and introduced new regular cast members Kerry Bishé, Dave Franco, and Michael Mosley, with Bishé becoming the show's new narrator, and season 8 recurring cast member Eliza Coupe promoted to main cast. Braff, Faison, and McGinley remained regular cast members, and others made guest appearances. This version of the show was canceled in May 2010.

The series received critical acclaim throughout its run and earned 17 Emmy Award nominations, including two for Outstanding Comedy Series. It also received a Peabody Award in 2006.

The series was revived by ABC in 2025, with the revival series premiering in February 2026.

== Overview ==
Scrubs focuses on the unique point of view of its main character and narrator, Dr. John Michael "J.D." Dorian (Zach Braff), with the exception of season nine being narrated by the new main character Lucy Bennett (Kerry Bishé). Most episodes feature multiple story lines thematically linked by voice-overs done by Braff, as well as the comical daydreams of J.D. According to Bill Lawrence, "What we decided was, rather than have it be a monotone narration, if it's going to be Zach's voice, we're going to do everything through J.D.'s eyes. It opened up a visual medium that those of us as comedy writers were not used to." Actors were given the chance to improvise their lines on set with encouragement by series creator Bill Lawrence, with Neil Flynn and Zach Braff being the main improvisors.

Almost every episode title for the first eight seasons begins with the word "My". Bill Lawrence says this is because each episode is J.D. writing in his diary (revealed in the commentary on the DVD of the first-season episode "My Hero"). A few episodes from seasons 2–8 are told from another character's perspective and have episode titles such as "His Story" or "Her Story". Apart from a brief period of narration from J.D. at the beginning and the end, these episodes primarily contain internal narration from other characters besides J.D. The transfer of the narration duties usually occurs at a moment of physical contact between two characters. In season nine, the episode titles start with "Our..." as the focus for that season shifted from the perspective of J.D. to a new group of medical students. The webisodes that accompanied season eight, Scrubs: Interns, also were named "Our...".

== Cast and characters ==
Scrubs' main cast, seasons 2–8 (left to right): John C. McGinley, Neil Flynn, Sarah Chalke, Zach Braff, Donald Faison, Ken Jenkins, and Judy Reyes.

For the first season, the series featured six main cast members, with recurring cast member Neil Flynn added as a seventh member in the second season, and numerous other characters recurring throughout the course of the series. In the ninth season, many of the original cast left as main cast members (with the exceptions of Zach Braff, Donald Faison, and John C. McGinley), while four new additions were made to the main cast for that season only.

- Zach Braff as John Michael "J.D." Dorian, the show's protagonist and narrator. J.D. is a young physician, who begins the series as an intern. His voice-over to the series comes from his internal thoughts and often features surreal fantasies. J.D. describes himself as a "sensi", short for "sensitive guy", enjoying acoustic alternative music and being a lover of hugs. Over the course of the series, J.D. rises through the ranks of the hospital before leaving Sacred Heart to become the Residency Director at St. Vincent Hospital, before briefly returning to become a teacher at Winston University. J.D. has a son, Sam with ex-girlfriend Kim Briggs and another son, Ollie with Elliot Reid.
- Sarah Chalke as Elliot Reid (seasons 1–8, recurring season 9), another intern and later private-practice physician. Her relationship with J.D. becomes romantic on several occasions throughout the series, resulting in them eventually marrying and having a son, Ollie together. The marriage ends up not lasting. As the series progresses, despite an initial dislike of each other, she becomes friends with Carla. Elliot is driven by a neurotic desire to prove her worth to her family (in which all of the males are doctors), her peers, and herself. She is described as extremely book-smart while her social abilities are somewhat lacking. Her social skills develop throughout the seasons.
- Donald Faison as Christopher Turk, J.D.'s best friend and surgeon, who rises from intern to chief of surgery as the series progresses. Turk and J.D. were roommates when they attended the College of William and Mary, as well as in medical school, and the two have an extremely close relationship. Turk is highly driven and competitive while always remaining loyal. During the course of the series, Turk forms a relationship with Carla; they start dating early in the series, then get married, and eventually start a family together, having four children. In season nine, he is a teacher at Winston University while continuing his duties as chief of surgery.
- Ken Jenkins as Bob Kelso (seasons 1–8, recurring season 9), Sacred Heart's chief of medicine for the first seven seasons, after which he retires; in season nine, he becomes a teacher at Winston University. While chief of medicine, Kelso is seen to be selfish, intimidating, and mean-spirited, driven primarily by the hospital's bottom line rather than the well-being of patients. It is occasionally suggested that he has a softer side, and that his meanness is a means of coping with the years of hard decisions. After his retirement in season seven, his relationship with staff at the hospital improves, becoming a regular at the hospital's coffee shop where he is entitled to "free muffins for life". He is married with a son and regularly comments on the poor state of his marriage and the activities of his homosexual son. In season nine, after the death of his wife, Kelso becomes a teacher at Winston University along with J.D., Cox, and Turk.
- John C. McGinley as Perry Cox, an attending physician who becomes the chief of medicine at Sacred Heart in season eight. J.D. considers Cox his mentor, despite the fact that Cox routinely criticizes him, patronizes him, and calls him female names. Cox frequently suggests that this cruel treatment is intended as conditioning for the rigors of hospital life. On rare occasions, he expresses grudging admiration and even pride at J.D.'s accomplishments. Dr. Cox is dedicated to the welfare of his patients and frequently expresses concern for them, leading to frequent arguments with Bob Kelso. In season nine, he is seen working as a professor at Winston University while continuing his duties as chief of medicine.
- Judy Reyes as Carla Espinosa (seasons 1–8), the hospital's head nurse. Carla is opinionated, stubborn, and domineering, but continually caring, acting as a mother figure to interns, supporting them and sticking up for them when they make mistakes. During the course of the series, Turk forms a relationship with Carla; they start dating in the first episode of the series, then get married, and eventually start a family together. She is very close to J.D., affectionately calling him "Bambi", and despite initially disliking each other, also becomes close friends with Elliot.
- Neil Flynn as the "Janitor" (recurring season 1, main cast seasons 2–8, guest star season 9), the hospital's custodian. An incident in the pilot episode establishes an antagonistic relationship between J.D. and him, which persists throughout the series. This tends to take the form of the Janitor pulling abusive pranks on J.D., although he has shown, several times throughout the series, that he has a good side. The Janitor's real name is not mentioned until the season eight finale when he reveals to J.D. that he is called "Glenn Matthews". Immediately thereafter, a hospital staff member walks by and calls him "Tommy".
- Eliza Coupe as Denise "Jo" Mahoney (recurring season 8, main cast season 9), an intern at Sacred Heart Hospital in season eight. She is outspoken and brutally honest, and struggles with patient-doctor communications because of this. In season nine, she is a resident at the new Sacred Heart Hospital, as well as a student adviser and teacher's assistant at Winston University. She is romantically involved with medical student Drew Suffin.
- Kerry Bishé as Lucy Bennett (season 9), a medical student at Winston University. She is the protagonist of season nine, initially sharing the narrating duties of the show with J.D. before taking over completely. She, like J.D., also has surreal fantasies. She loves horses and is romantically involved with a fellow student, Cole Aaronson.
- Michael Mosley as Drew Suffin (season 9), a medical student at Winston University. Though few details are ever given, Drew's dark past is often alluded to, including a previous burn-out at medical school. He is in a relationship with Denise Mahoney.
- Dave Franco as Cole Aaronson (season 9), an arrogant medical student at Winston University whose family donated a large amount of money to get the new Sacred Heart Hospital built and as such, believes that he is untouchable. After being diagnosed with skin cancer and subsequently going into remission after successful surgery, Cole rethinks his life and decides to specialize in surgery. He is in a relationship with Lucy Bennett.

== Episodes ==
Scrubs (TV series) series overview
Series	Season	Episodes	Originally released			Average viewers (millions)	Rank
Series	Season	Episodes	First released	Last released	Network	Average viewers (millions)	Rank
Original series	1	24	October 2, 2001	May 21, 2002	NBC	11.20	38
Original series	2	22	September 26, 2002	April 17, 2003	NBC	15.94	14
Original series	3	22	October 2, 2003	May 4, 2004	NBC	10.41	43
Original series	4	25	August 31, 2004	May 10, 2005	NBC	6.90	88
Original series	5	24	January 3, 2006	May 16, 2006	NBC	6.40	98
Original series	6	22	November 30, 2006	May 17, 2007	NBC	6.41	87
Original series	7	11	October 25, 2007	May 8, 2008	NBC	6.38	115
Original series	8	19	January 6, 2009	May 6, 2009	ABC	5.54	106
Original series	9	13	December 1, 2009	March 17, 2010	ABC	3.79	116

The first season introduces John Michael "J.D." Dorian and his best friend Christopher Turk in their first year out of medical school as interns at Sacred Heart Hospital. J.D. meets his reluctant mentor Perry Cox; an attractive female intern named Elliot, on whom he develops a crush; the hospital's janitor, who goes out of his way to make J.D.'s life difficult; Chief of Medicine Dr. Bob Kelso, who is more concerned about the budget than the patients; and Carla Espinosa, the head nurse who eventually becomes Turk's girlfriend. The characters face romance and relationship issues, family obligations, overwhelming paperwork, long shifts, dealing with death of patients, and conflicting pressures from senior doctors.

The second season follows J.D.'s second year practicing medicine at Sacred Heart where Elliot, Turk, and he are now residents. As the season develops, money issues affect the three of them, especially Elliot, whose dad cut her off. J.D.'s older brother Dan (Tom Cavanagh) comes to visit, as does Turk's brother Kevin (D. L. Hughley). Season two focuses on the romantic relationships of the main characters: Turk proposes to an indecisive Carla, who has doubts about if Turk is mature enough; Elliot dates nurse Paul Flowers (Rick Schroder); and Dr. Cox dates pharmaceutical rep Julie (Heather Locklear) before reigniting a relationship with his pregnant ex-wife Jordan (Christa Miller). J.D., meanwhile, attempts a relationship with Elliot, and later falls for Jamie (Amy Smart), the wife of one of his coma patients.

As the third season opens, Elliot decides to change her image with some help from the Janitor. J.D.'s undeniable crush on Elliot emerges again, but J.D. instead begins a relationship with Jordan's sister Danni (Tara Reid), who is also dealing with feelings for her ex. Turk and Carla are engaged and planning their wedding. Turk, along with Todd and the other surgical residents, deal with new attending surgeon Grace Miller (Bellamy Young), who dislikes Turk and considers him sexist. Cox and Jordan are doing well with their relationship and their son Jack, although Cox develops a schoolboy crush on Dr. Miller. He also struggles with the death of his best friend, Jordan's brother. Elliot gets into a serious relationship with Sean Kelly (Scott Foley) and tries to maintain a long-distance relationship while he is in New Zealand for six months. J.D. eventually convinces Elliot to break up with Sean to date him, only to realize, once he has her, that he does not actually love her. Their relationship lasts three days. The season ends with Turk and Carla's wedding, which Turk misses due to surgery and a church mix-up.

In season four, J.D. finishes his residency and becomes a full-blown colleague of Cox, although their dynamic does not change much. As the season opens, Turk arrives from his honeymoon with Carla, but they soon start having issues when Carla tries to change many things about her new husband. Their marriage and Turk's friendship with J.D. experience friction when J.D. and Carla share a drunken kiss. Dr. Cox and Jordan learn that their divorce was not final, but this is not necessarily all good news. Elliot is still angry with J.D. for breaking her heart, and the situation becomes more uncomfortable still when she dates J.D.'s brother. J.D. has a new love interest of his own when a new and very attractive psychiatrist, Dr. Molly Clock (Heather Graham), arrives at Sacred Heart. Molly also serves as Elliot's mentor during her time at the hospital.

Season five starts with J.D. living in a hotel, sorting out apartment issues. Elliot is dating Jake who builds her confidence up so she applies for, and gets, a new fellowship in another hospital. Turk and Carla are trying to have a baby, despite Turk's still having doubts. Finally, new interns have arrived to Sacred Heart, chief among them being Keith Dudemeister (Travis Schuldt), who soon becomes Elliot's new boyfriend, much to J.D.'s dissatisfaction. J.D. is cast in the role of expecting father, discovering at the very end of the season that his girlfriend, Dr. Kim Briggs (Elizabeth Banks), is pregnant with his child.

The sixth season has J.D. and the other characters mature to fill the different roles required of them. Turk and Carla become parents when Carla gives birth to their daughter Isabella. Elliot plans her wedding to Keith, although J.D. and she still harbor feelings for each other. Dr. Cox, as father of two children with Jordan, struggles to prevent his foul disposition from affecting his parenting.

In season seven, J.D. and Elliot struggle once again to deny their feelings for each other, despite Elliot soon to be marrying Keith and J.D. to have his first son with Kim, while the Janitor may have a new girlfriend. Bob Kelso's job is put on the line as he turns 65 years old. J.D.'s brother Dan also returns to town.

The eighth season has Kelso's replacement, Taylor Maddox (Courteney Cox), arrive; she quickly makes a lot of changes, affecting the way doctors treat patients. Elliot and J.D. finally discuss their true feelings for each other and again become a couple. Janitor and Lady (Kit Pongetti) marry, while Cox is promoted to chief of medicine to replace the dismissed Dr. Maddox, with some encouragement from Kelso. Kelso and Dr. Cox become friends, and J.D. prepares to leave Sacred Heart to move closer to his son, with Elliot. Turk is promoted to chief of surgery at Sacred Heart.

Coinciding with season eight, the webisode series Scrubs: Interns was launched, focusing around the eighth season's medical interns, Sonja "Sunny" Dey (Sonal Shah), Denise (Eliza Coupe), Katie (Betsy Beutler), and Howie (Todd Bosley). The interns learn from various characters of the show about life in the hospital.

The ninth season takes place over a year after season eight's finale. The old Sacred Heart hospital has been torn down and rebuilt. Cox, Dorian, and Turk are now Winston University medical school professors whose students occasionally rotate through the new Sacred Heart. Between the end of season eight and the beginning of season nine, the Janitor has left the hospital after being told that J.D. was not returning, and Elliot and J.D. have married and are expecting their first child. J.D.'s stay at the university is short, and he leaves the series after six episodes, reappearing in episode 9, "Our Stuff Gets Real", as a secondary character. Kelso's wife passes away, and Ted quits Sacred Heart to travel around the U.S. with his girlfriend.

The revival series retcons most of the events of the prior season. Sacred Heart was never torn down. Sixteen years later, J.D. is divorced from Elliot and becomes a concierge doctor, when he is suddenly called back to Sacred Heart. Perry steps down as Chief of Medicine and offers the position to J.D., which he accepts.

== Production ==
The origin for the show is loosely based on Dr. Jonathan Doris's experiences as a resident in internal medicine at Brown Medical School, which served as inspiration for college friend and show creator Bill Lawrence.

Scrubs was produced by Touchstone Television (later known as ABC Studios and ABC Signature), a sister company to Disney's broadcasting company ABC, although it was aired by ABC's rival broadcaster NBC for the first seven seasons. According to show runner Lawrence, the arrangement was unusual, at least for 2007: "The show is a dinosaur, on one network and completely owned by another" and, since it is now in syndication, making a "ton of money for Touchstone."

In 2024, ABC Signature was folded into 20th Television, another TV production company owned by Disney. 20th Television produced the revival series in 2026.

=== Crew ===
The show's creator, Bill Lawrence, was also an executive producer and the showrunner of the original run. He wrote 14 episodes and directed 17. Neil Goldman and Garrett Donovan co-wrote 13 episodes during their eight-year run on the show, starting as co-producers on the show and ending as executive producers; they left the show after the eighth season. Aseem Batra, a story editor, executive story editor, and co-producer of the original run, was the showrunner of the revival series. Mike Schwartz, who also played Lloyd the Delivery Guy, wrote 13 episodes during the first eight seasons; he started out as a story editor and became co-executive producer in season six. Janae Bakken and Debra Fordham were writers and producers during the first eight seasons, each writing 16 episodes. Other notable writers who started in the first season include Mark Stegemann, who wrote 14 episodes and directed two episodes during the first eight seasons; Gabrielle Allan, who wrote 11 episodes during the first four seasons and was co-executive producer; Eric Weinberg, who wrote 11 episodes during the first six seasons and was co-executive producer; Matt Tarses, who wrote eight episodes during the first four seasons and was co-executive producer. Notable writers who joined in the second season include Tim Hobert, who wrote 11 episodes from seasons two to six, and became executive producer in season five. Angela Nissel wrote 10 episodes from seasons two to eight, starting out as a staff writer and became supervising producer in season seven. Bill Callahan joined the show in season four, writing eight episodes from seasons four to eight; he became executive producer in season six.

Adam Bernstein, who directed the pilot episode, "My First Day", also directed 11 episodes up until season seven. Michael Spiller directed the most episodes, 20 during the entire series run. Ken Whittingham and Chris Koch both directed 12 episodes from seasons two to nine. Comedian Michael McDonald, who also appeared on the show, directed five episodes. Show star Zach Braff directed seven episodes of the show, including the landmark 100th episode "My Way Home", which won a Peabody Award in April 2007. In 2009, Josh Bycel, a writer and supervising producer for the animated comedy American Dad!, joined the crew as a new executive producer for the ninth season.

Scrubs writers worked with several medical advisors, including doctors Jonathan Doris, Jon Turk, and Dolly Klock. Their names serve as the basis for the names of characters John Dorian, Chris Turk, and Molly Clock (played by Braff, Faison, and Heather Graham, respectively). In the season eight finale "My Finale", the "real J.D.", Jonathan Doris, made a cameo appearance as the doctor who said "adios" to J.D. In addition, the show creator said that every single medical story on the show was handed to them by real physicians, whose names would then be written into the show. The show never used real patients' names, but Lawrence and his writers would make sure the doctors' names were written into the episodes.

=== Filming locations ===
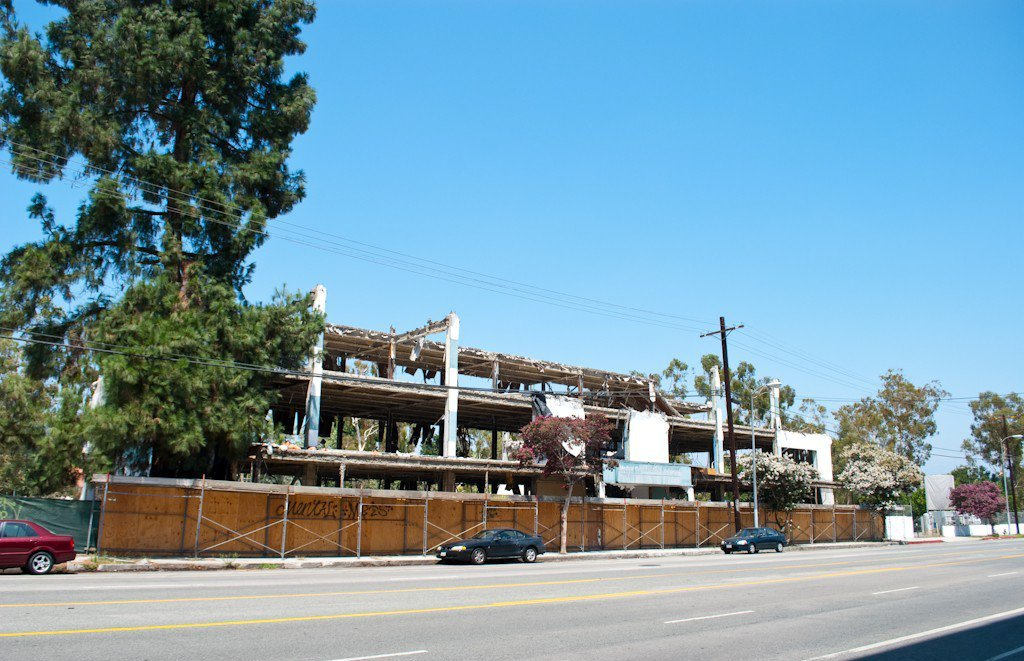
Scrubs' original filming location, the North Hollywood Medical Center, being torn down during the sixteen-year break between seasons nine and ten.

In the show, Sacred Heart is an inner-city teaching hospital, the location of which is left ambiguous. The first eight seasons of Scrubs were filmed on location at the North Hollywood Medical Center, a decommissioned hospital located at 12629 Riverside Drive in the Valley Village neighborhood of Los Angeles. The site is on the south bank of the concrete channel of the Los Angeles River, visible in some scenes on the series.

The production of Scrubs took complete control of the hospital, with the existing hospital rooms reworked to be more production-friendly. This involved knocking down various walls to create larger, more open spaces such as the main ward and the communal areas like admissions, which did not originally exist. Production designer Cabot McMullen also introduced more glass walls and windows around the hospital sets, as well as putting in nurses stations, which could be easily moved to allow different camera movements. While much of the building was renovated, the team were very keen to preserve the state of disrepair which the hospital was in, to give the show a more gritty, dank aesthetic.

Other recurring locations were also built into the building, including J.D. and Turk's apartment, a bar which they frequent and Dr. Cox's apartment–which was built in an old operating room. As well as these permanent locations, the production team would also often construct temporary sets as required, also within the hospital. Almost all of the team responsible for the show were housed within the hospital; this included all of the writers, production and casting team. Post-production was also handled in the building, with an editing suite and a sound studio for ADR.

Instead of the more traditional artist trailers for the cast to retreat to during breaks, they were instead all given old hospital rooms as well as a small allowance to decorate them. In some instances when either filming went on late, or the cast and crew went out after work, some, such as John C. McGinley would go and sleep in their dressing room at the hospital instead of going home. Cast and crew on the show refer to the location as "San DiFrangeles"—a portmanteau of San Diego, San Francisco, and Los Angeles that is meant to encompass a large part of California. In season four's episode nine, "My Malpractice Decision", Turk's new phone number has the Sacramento area code 916. For the ninth season, the show moved to Culver Studios, with exteriors shot on lawns and outside the historical office bungalows of the studio complex. The building used for the exteriors of the new Sacred Heart Hospital is located at the intersection of Ince Boulevard and Lindblade Street in Culver City, California (34.023988°N 118.391414°W).

The 2026 revival was filmed in Vancouver, British Columbia from October 2025. The hospital used for seasons 1–8 had been torn down by then and its interiors and bottom floor exterior were faithfully recreated to scale at a Vancouver warehouse.

=== Title sequence ===
The chest X-ray featured at the end of the title sequence was hung backwards for most of the first five seasons. Lawrence has stated that having the X-ray backwards was intentional as it signified that the new interns were inexperienced. During Zach Braff's audio commentary on "My Last Chance", he states that the error was actually unintentional. The error became somewhat infamous and was even parodied in "My Cabbage".

An attempt was made to fix the error in the extended title sequence used at the beginning of season two that included Neil Flynn, but the extended sequence (including corrected X-ray) was soon scrapped due to fan and network request. Finally, in "My Urologist", Dr. Kim Briggs steps into the credits and switches the X-ray around, saying, "That's backwards; it's been bugging me for years". At the beginning of season eight, when the series switched to ABC, the chest X-ray was once again backwards.

The ninth season features a new title sequence with a new version of the theme song "Superman" performed by WAZ. The new title sequences features the four new characters–Denise, Lucy, Drew, and Cole, as well as Dr. Cox and Turk, while J.D. is seen at the end placing the chest X-ray. In all season nine episodes that do not feature J.D., he is absent from the title sequence and Lucy is the one placing the X-ray. The X-ray at the end of the sequence is also not backwards and the subtitle "Med School" appears at the end of the sequence.

The revival series uses an updated version of the original title sequence, complete with the original Lazlo Bane version of the theme. However, Dr. Cox and Carla do not appear in this version of the intro, with new interns being seen instead. The X-ray has also been replaced with a digital one, with J.D. swiping it onto a TV screen from a tablet. The X-ray is once again not backwards.

=== Cinematography ===
The show is shot with a single instead of multiple-camera setup more typical for sitcoms. The season four episode "My Life in Four Cameras", has a brief multiple-camera style, since it includes J.D.'s fantasies of life being more like a traditional sitcom.

John Inwood, the cinematographer of the series, shot the series with his own Aaton XTR prod Super16 film camera. While some broadcasters, such as the BBC, consider Super 16 a "non-HD" format, John Inwood believed that footage from his camera could not only be scanned and broadcast in high definition, but it also "looked terrific." The intro of the first season, which was broadcast in 4:3, was reused in an HD version for season eight without any further changes.

Except for the finale of season five, "My Transition", which was broadcast in high definition, the first seven seasons of the show have been broadcast in standard definition with a 4:3 aspect ratio. After the show was moved from NBC to ABC, the broadcast format for new episodes changed to high definition and widescreen. John Inwood opined that older episodes could be remastered into HD widescreen from the original film negatives. From the very beginning, he filmed the show with widescreen delivery in mind so the whole series could be aired in widescreen when the market and technology evolved.

The first nine seasons have been released on DVD in 4:3 format. However, the eighth season was also released on Blu-ray Disc in the original widescreen format.

=== WGA strike and network change ===
On November 5, 2007, the Writers Guild of America went on strike, which put the production of the show's seventh season on hold. When the strike started, only 11 of Scrubs' 18 planned seventh-season episodes had been finished. Lawrence refused to cross any WGA picket lines to serve any of his duties for the show, so ABC Studios had non-WGA members finish episode 12, which the studio had unsuccessfully pressured Lawrence to rewrite as a series finale prior to the strike.

During the strike, NBC announced that The Office and Scrubs would be replaced by Celebrity Apprentice. NBC later announced that they would leave Scrubs on hiatus for the time being and fill the 8–9 pm timeslot with various specials and repeats.

Episode 11, "My Princess", was eventually filmed, although Lawrence was absent. Filming of episode 11 was disrupted by picketers. It was believed that Lawrence had tipped the picketers off about the filming schedule, although these beliefs turned out to be false as Lawrence quickly drove to the set to "keep the peace". After the strike ended, Lawrence announced that the final episodes of Scrubs would be produced, although at the time, he was unsure where or how they would be distributed.

Amid strike-induced doubt involving the final episodes of Scrubs, on February 28, 2008, The Hollywood Reporter reported that ABC was in talks with corporate sibling ABC Studios with the aim of bringing Scrubs to ABC for an eighth season of 18 episodes, despite Lawrence and Braff's protests that the seventh season would definitely be the last. Just hours later, Variety reported that NBC was lashing out and threatening legal action against ABC Studios. McGinley confirmed that he had been told to report back to work on March 24, 2008, to begin production for another season. On March 12, 2008, McGinley was also quoted as saying that the show's long-rumored move from NBC to ABC was a done deal, and that Scrubs would air on ABC during the 2008–09 TV season as a midseason replacement.

On March 19, 2008, Michael Ausiello of TV Guide reported that although nothing was "official", the Scrubs cast was to report back to work the following Wednesday for work on a season "unofficial" as yet. Zach Braff posted in his blog on Myspace, on April 28, 2008, that an eighth season consisting of 18 episodes was under production, but that he could not say where it would be aired. He then stated, on May 7, 2008, that the May 8 episode would be the final NBC-aired episode of Scrubs, which was followed by a bulletin on his Myspace, on May 12, confirming that Scrubs's eighth season would be moving to ABC.

==== Season eight ====
On May 13, 2008, ABC announced that Scrubs would be a midseason replacement, airing Tuesday nights at 9:00 pm EST. Steve McPherson, ABC's President of Entertainment, also stated that additional seasons of Scrubs beyond the eighth could be produced if it performed well. In late November, ABC announced Scrubs would resume with back-to-back episodes on January 6, 2009, at 9:00 pm EST.

Creator Bill Lawrence described season eight as more like the first few seasons in tone, with increased focus on more realistic storylines, accompanied by the introduction of new characters. Courteney Cox joined the cast as the new chief of medicine, Dr. Maddox, for a three-episode arc. The eighth season includes webisodes and is the first Scrubs season broadcast in high definition.

Sarah Chalke was hoping that J.D. and Elliot would end up back together, comparing them to Friends characters Ross and Rachel, which has been addressed a few times on the show. In the early episodes of the season, they did rekindle their relationship, and continued dating through the end of the season. Several actors who guest starred as patients at Sacred Heart during the course of Scrubs returned for the finale.

The double-length season eight finale, "My Finale", aired on May 6, 2009, and was expected to be the series finale, as well. However, it soon became clear that the show would return for a ninth season.

==== Season nine ====
On April 16, 2009, Bill Lawrence wrote on the ABC.com message boards that a ninth season of Scrubs was still "50/50". On April 28, it was announced that ABC was in talks to renew Scrubs for another year.

Lawrence also stated that Scrubs as it was is over, for the show to move forward with a new cast in an ER type role on ABC, or take a new title completely. In response to criticisms that the change would tarnish Scrubs' legacy, Lawrence defended the decision, as it would allow the Scrubs crew to continue work through a recession: "'Legacy shmegacy.' I'm really proud of the show, I'll continue to be proud of the show, but I love all of those people..."

On June 19, 2009, it was announced that the ninth season of Scrubs would "shift from the hospital to the classroom and make med-school professors of John C. McGinley's Dr. Cox and Donald Faison's Turk." According to Lawrence, the ninth season would "be a lot like Paper Chase as a comedy," with Cox's and Turk's students occasionally rotating through the halls of Sacred Heart and encountering former series regulars. McGinley and Faison were joined by "a quartet of newbies (most of them playing students)" as full-time regulars, while one of the freshmen "will be fairly famous."

Of the seven actors who had appeared in the show since the pilot, only Faison and McGinley retained their roles as regulars. Zach Braff returned part-time and was absent for the majority of the season, while retaining lead billing for six episodes. Sarah Chalke returned for four episodes as a guest star; Ken Jenkins, credited as a guest star, appeared in nine of the 13 episodes; Neil Flynn appeared in the season premiere in a brief cameo; Judy Reyes was the only former star not to return to the show. In an interview on the YouTube series Made Man, John C. McGinley stated that the reason for some cast members not returning was that they demanded higher salaries. Although he did not confirm which cast members, he did specify that two of the original cast made demands; hence, they were not brought back.

The new main cast included Eliza Coupe returning to the recurring role of Denise "Jo" Mahoney from season eight, Dave Franco as Cole, a charming, confidently stupid, and incredibly entitled medical student whose family donated the money to build the school, Kerry Bishé as Lucy, who shared the starring role with Braff in the beginning of the season and eventually became the show's new narrator, and Michael Mosley as Drew, a 30-year-old med student on his last attempt at school.

Production for the ninth season took place at Culver Studios.

=== Cancellation ===
On May 14, 2010, it was officially announced that the show was canceled. The season nine finale, titled "Our Thanks", aired on March 17, 2010. Five days later, on March 22, 2010, Zach Braff announced, via the official Facebook page, that the ninth season of Scrubs would be the last, commenting that, "Many of you have asked, so here it is: it appears that 'New Scrubs', 'Scrubs 2.0', 'Scrubs with New Kids', 'Scrubbier', 'Scrubs without JD' is no more. It was worth a try, but alas... it didn't work."

=== Revival ===
As early as 2022, series creator Bill Lawrence planned on doing a revival of the series. In December 2024, it was reported that a Scrubs revival was in development at ABC from Lawrence. In July 2025, the revival received a series order and it was confirmed Zach Braff, Donald Faison and Sarah Chalke would return. The revival was then set to debut during the 2025–26 television season on ABC. In September 2025, Judy Reyes and John C. McGinley were confirmed to return in recurring roles. Executive producers include Lawrence, Braff, Faison, Chalke, Jeff Ingold, Liza Katzer, Tim Hobert and Aseem Batra, with Hobert and Batra serving as showrunners. In October 2025, it was reported that Hobert left the production due to creative differences. The series premiered on February 25, 2026, with back-to-back episodes.

At the end of April 2026, ABC renewed the Scrubs revival for a second season. The second season will consist of ten episodes and premiered on September 30, 2026.

== Music ==
Music plays a large role in Scrubs. A wide variety of rock, pop, and indie artists are featured, and almost every episode ends with a musical montage summing up the themes and plot lines of the episode, and the music for these montages is often picked even before the episodes are completely written.

Members of the cast and crew were encouraged to contribute song suggestions, with many ideas coming from series creator Bill Lawrence, writer Neil Goldman, and actors Zach Braff (whose college friends Cary Brothers and Joshua Radin appear on the Scrubs soundtrack) and Christa Miller (who selected Colin Hay and Tammany Hall NYC). According to Lawrence, "Christa picks so much of the music for the show that a lot of the writers and actors don't even go to me anymore when they have a song. They hand it to her."

Featured songs present in the original broadcasts appear mostly unaltered on the DVD releases of the show (with the exception of the first season). However, a lot of songs were replaced in the versions released to streaming services such as Netflix and Hulu due to licensing issues.

Scrubs featured a musical episode in the sixth season, "My Musical", guest-starring Tony-nominated Avenue Q actress Stephanie D'Abruzzo. The episode was nominated for five Emmy Awards, winning one.

=== Theme song ===
The theme song of the series, performed by Lazlo Bane, is titled "Superman", and can be found on the album All the Time in the World, as well as on the first Scrubs soundtrack. Lawrence credits Braff for finding and suggesting "Superman" as the theme song, with the specific lyric "I'm no Superman" serving as an allusion to the fallibility of the lead characters.

The Scrubs main title is performed at a faster tempo than the original recording of the song. The original, slower recording was used briefly at the beginning of season two, played during an extended version of the title sequence, as well as the opening for "My Urologist", and a special edit of the title sequence for resulting in roughly 1–2 seconds of music, followed by the line "I'm no Superman", accompanied by a quick flash of credits. The original introduction from season one was used through most of season three and then used for seasons four through eight. In the ninth season, a new version of "Superman" is used, performed by WAZ.

=== Soundtracks ===
Three official soundtracks have been released. The first soundtrack, Music from Scrubs, was released on CD on September 24, 2002. The second soundtrack, Scrubs Original Soundtrack Vol. 2, was released exclusively on iTunes on May 9, 2006. The third soundtrack, "My Musical" Soundtrack, featured the music composed and performed in musical episode "My Musical"; it was released on Amazon.com and iTunes on August 7, 2007.

=== Featured musical contributors ===
Colin Hay, the former frontman of Men at Work, has had music featured in at least seven episodes, and has appeared in the episode "My Overkill", performing the song "Overkill" as a street musician, and in the episode "My Hard Labor" performing "Down Under". Hay also sings "Where Everybody Knows Your Name", the theme from Cheers, in the episode "My Life in Four Cameras" and the episode "My Philosophy" features Hay's song "Waiting For My Real Life To Begin", sung by several members of the cast. He also appeared in "My Finale".

The music of Joshua Radin, who is a friend of Scrubs star Zach Braff, appeared in six episodes.

Music by Keren DeBerg has featured in 15 episodes, and she appeared in "My Musical" as an extra in the song "All Right".

Clay Aiken appeared in the episode "My Life in Four Cameras" and performed the song "Isn't She Lovely?" by Stevie Wonder.

=== The Worthless Peons ===
The Worthless Peons (also known as Ted's Band, The Blanks, or in the "My Way Home" Director's Cut, as "Foghat") are an a cappella group made up of Sacred Heart hospital employees from different departments. They are a cover band, and often sing songs from a specific genre (for example, cartoon theme songs or commercial jingles).

The Worthless Peons are played by The Blanks, who are a real-life a cappella band made up of Sam Lloyd (who plays Ted), George Miserlis, Paul F. Perry, and Philip McNiven. The Blanks' album, Riding the Wave, features guest appearances from Lawrence and members of the Scrubs cast. This band was put on the show when Sam Lloyd brought his a cappella band to the Scrubs cast Christmas party. Lloyd told Lawrence about his band, and Lawrence got the idea of putting them in the show.

The Worthless Peons also sing the theme song to the web series Scrubs: Interns, which features the new interns from season eight learning about the hospital in the same way that J.D. did in season one. Interns is aired on the ABC website.

== Reception ==
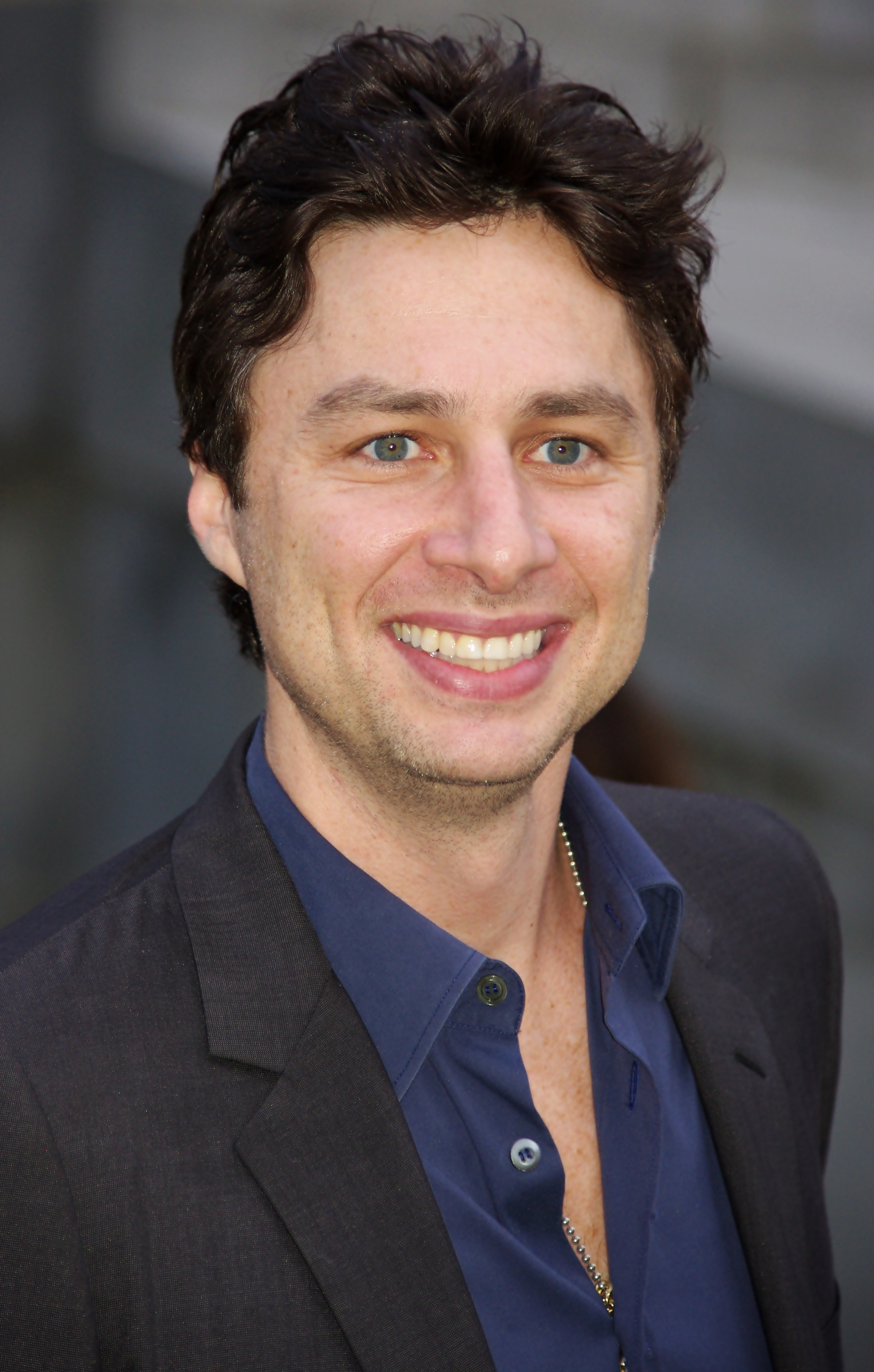
Zach Braff's portrayal as J.D. received critical acclaim, earning him one Emmy and three Golden Globe nominations for his performance.

=== Critical reception ===
==== First eight seasons ====
Throughout its original run, Scrubs received critical acclaim, with many critics praising its cast, characters, and humor (especially J.D.'s fantasy sequences). In 2006, Gillian Flynn of Entertainment Weekly gave the overall series (the review was made early after the fifth-season premiere) a grade of "A−", with the author saying "Scrubs is the trickiest comedy on TV [...] A likable, daffy, buoyant series that would be a big annoying mess if it weren't done just right, Scrubs is the very definition of nimble". IGN gave the first season a perfect score of 10. The seven following seasons were rated, respectively, 9, 9, 9, 8, 7.5, 8.3 and 7.5.

Review aggregate Metacritic only assigned an average score to the first, eighth and ninth seasons, with the first and eighth seasons both scoring 79/100, indicating "generally favorable" reviews.

The Truth About Nursing, which checks the realism of the medical series, gave Scrubs a "Nursing rating" of 1.5 out of 4 stars, but an "Artistic rating" of 3 out of 4 stars, praising that "despite the nasty and surreal elements, its characters are not above learning or growing, as they try to cope with the very real stresses of life and death at the hospital". However, the reviewer stated, "The show's portrayal of nursing has been less impressive".

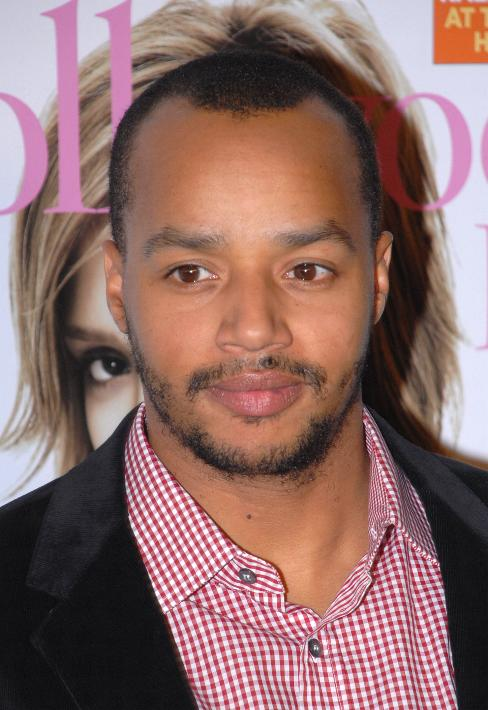
The ninth season's new characters were heavily criticized. However, the performances of original cast members (including Donald Faison, pictured) were praised.

==== Ninth season ====
The ninth season received mixed reviews, with many critics heavily criticizing the new cast; it received a score of 62/100 on Metacritic, indicating "generally favorable" reviews. An IGN editor gave it a positive score of 7 out of 10, stating "even though this was not the best season, I'll always have fond memories of the show".

USA Today reviewer Robert Bianco wrote a negative review, stating "The result is a deadly, deal-driven mistake that takes a network that has made great sitcom strides forward one unfortunate step back". He also noted that the presence of a few members of the original cast (Braff, Faison, and John C. McGinley) "only makes it harder for the new characters to take hold" (despite his additional criticism of Braff's performance). Blogcritics gave it a mixed review, criticizing the new cast, but praising the performances by the original cast members.

=== Ratings ===
The premiere episode of the Scrubs revival drew 11.36 million viewers across platforms in the five days following its February 25 broadcast on ABC. The figure combines Nielsen Media Research measurements of the original telecast and encore airings, as well as streaming on Hulu, Disney+, and other digital platforms. Disney announced that the episode marked ABC's most-streamed comedy episode and most-streamed series premiere in more than a year. The five-day total represented a 158% increase from the live-plus-same-day audience of 4.4 million viewers.

=== Accolades ===
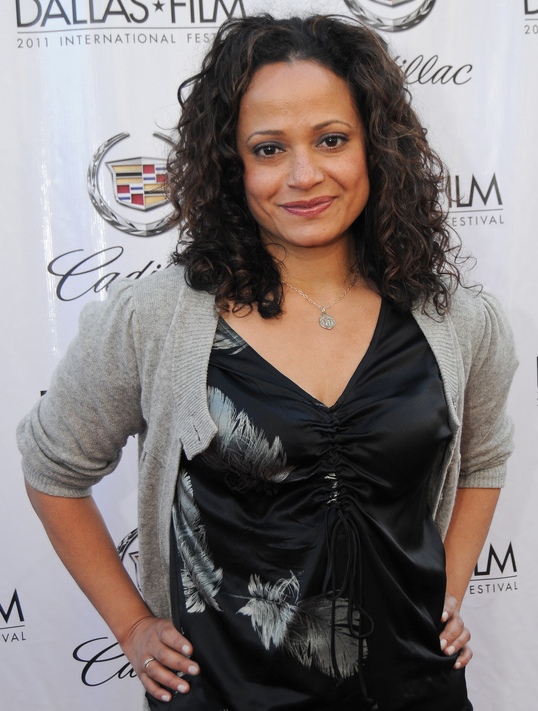
Judy Reyes was nominated for four ALMA Awards, winning two.

Scrubs received 17 Emmy nominations, in categories such as casting, cinematography, directing, editing, and writing, winning only two. Its fourth season earned the series its first nomination for Outstanding Comedy Series. Zach Braff was also nominated that year for Outstanding Lead Actor in a Comedy Series. The series was nominated again the following year for Outstanding Comedy Series, and won its first Emmy, for Outstanding Picture Editing for a Multi-Camera Comedy Series, for "My Life in Four Cameras" . At the 59th Primetime Emmy Awards, the episode "My Musical" was nominated for five awards in four categories: Outstanding Directing for a Comedy Series (Will Mackenzie), Outstanding Music Direction (Jan Stevens) and Outstanding Original Music and Lyrics ("Everything Comes Down to Poo" and "Guy Love"); and won its second Emmy (co-winner with Entourage), for Outstanding Sound Mixing for a Comedy or Drama Series (Half-Hour) And Animation (Joe Foglia, Peter J. Nusbaum, and John W. Cook II).

Braff was nominated for the Golden Globe award for Best Actor in a Television Series, Comedy or Musical in 2005, 2006, and 2007.

The show won the 2002, 2008, and 2009 Humanitas Prize, an award created for rewarding human dignity, meaning, and freedom. It also won a Peabody Award.

== In other media ==
=== Crossovers ===
Zach Braff, Sarah Chalke, Judy Reyes, John C. McGinley and Neil Flynn reprised their roles as J.D., Elliot Reid, Carla Espinosa, Perry Cox, and the Janitor to make a cameo appearance in the 2002 Muppets film It's a Very Merry Muppet Christmas Movie, trying to reanimate Miss Piggy. Eventually, Piggy and the Scrubs cast break the fourth wall, with the actors portraying themselves and Bill Lawrence appearing as himself/the director of the current episode.

Neil Flynn reprised his role as Janitor in the Clone High season 1 episode "Litter Kills: Litterally". In the episode, Janitor is revealed to work part-time at Clone High, where his adoptive son, a clone of Ponce De León, attends high school until he is killed, and Janitor is fired by Principal Scudworth. In a speech at The College of William and Mary in Williamsburg, Virginia on January 29, 2009, Bill Lawrence confirmed that the name Scudworth called Janitor in the episode, "Glenn", was in the fact the character's real name, with his full name confirmed as "Glenn Matthews" in the season 8 finale of Scrubs. In the season 2 finale of the 2023 revival of Clone High, Flynn reprised his role as Janitor for the first time since the Scrubs season 9 premiere "Our First Day of School"; revealed to have been since rehired in his old position as Janitor of Clone High, Janitor signs Joan of Arc's Clone High 2023 yearbook, telling her (and signing) that "You're a lone wolf, just like me! – Janitor", before howling and walking away.

Sam Lloyd reprised his role as Ted Buckland in the season two finale of the Lawrence series Cougar Town. In the episode, written and directed by Lawrence, Ted is in Hawaii and says his girlfriend, Stephanie Gooch, has run off with Dr. Hooch. Lloyd reprised his role again in the season three episode "A One Story Town" which also featured Ken Jenkins, Robert Maschio, Zach Braff, Christa Miller, Sarah Chalke, and the Worthless Peons in cameo appearances at the end of the episode, with a confused Ted saying "This is weird, man! Everyone here looks like someone from my old job."

=== Podcast ===
On March 31, 2020, Zach Braff and Donald Faison launched their Scrubs-themed podcast Fake Doctors, Real Friends in partnership with iHeartRadio in which Braff and Faison rewatch each episode and give behind-the-scenes details on the series. On August 26, 2025, Braff and Faison released an episode titled "Our Last Hurrah" stating the podcast would terminate due to time commitments.

=== Scrubs: Interns ===
A web series of 3 to 5 minute episodes that are interlaced with season 8.
