= Angela Nissel =

American author and television writer (born 1978)

- Born: Angela R. Nissel; December 5, 1978 (age 47); Philadelphia, Pennsylvania, U.S.
- Education: University of Pennsylvania
- Occupations: Author, television writer
- Years active: 1999–present
- Notable work: Scrubs; The Boondocks; Mixed-ish

Angela R. Nissel (born December 5, 1978) is an American author and television writer best known for her first book The Broke Diaries: The Completely True and Hilarious Misadventures of a Good Girl Gone Broke. She was a writer and executive producer for Scrubs. Nissel also worked as a writer and consulting producer in the fourth season of The Boondocks and was a co-executive producer and writer for the ABC sitcom Mixed-ish.

== Biography ==
Nissel was born and raised in Philadelphia. She attended the Philadelphia High School for Creative and Performing Arts, where she majored in Creative Writing, and she graduated from the University of Pennsylvania in 1998 with a degree in medical anthropology. She is married to WWE Hall of Famer Sean “X-Pac” Waltman.

Her first book The Broke Diaries was published in 2001 and was promoted in non-traditional ways. In one case, her friend applied "Buy The Broke Diaries!" stickers to ramen noodle packages and passed them out near bookstores. Nissel also promoted the book in her signature when she posted on Internet forums. She has appeared on The Oprah Winfrey Show, and was featured with her mother on 20/20, which also featured her second book, Mixed: My Life in Black and White, a comedic look at growing up as the child of a biracial couple.

On October 28, 2006, Nissel made her debut as a panelist on NPR's Wait Wait... Don't Tell Me!. In 1999, she founded the music-related website Okayplayer with The Roots' drummer Ahmir Thompson.

== Books ==
- The Broke Diaries: The Completely True and Hilarious Misadventures of a Good Girl Gone Broke. Villard. 2001. ISBN 978-0-679-78357-2.
- Mixed: My Life in Black and White. Villard. 2006. ISBN 978-0-345-48114-6.
