= Debra Fordham =

American television producer and writer

Debra Fordham is an American television producer and writer. She is best known for her work on the sitcom Scrubs.

== Early life ==
Fordham is a graduate of Valdosta State University in Valdosta, Georgia, where she studied theatre under the direction of Dr. Randy Wheeler. In early 2008 she was in Valdosta again to see VSU's production of her play Holler Me Home, centered on the lives of a family of Okefenokee swampers. Holler Me Home was accepted into WaterTower Theatre's 2008 Out of the Loop Festival in Addison, Texas.

== Career ==
She wrote sixteen episodes of Scrubs, two of which, "My Life in Four Cameras" and "My Musical", are considered to be among the best Scrubs episodes. Fordham also appears briefly at the end of the Scrubs episode "My Full Moon", where she plays a doctor who gets over-excited at a cup of coffee and performs an action described by Dr. Todd Quinlan as the "low arm pump".

Fordham's other television credits include Army Wives and Hart of Dixie. She served as a co-executive producer on the ABC television series Nashville, and then on the YouTube Original Impulse.
