= Mike Schwartz (screenwriter) =

American screenwriter and actor

- Born: Boston, Massachusetts, United States
- Occupations: Writer, producer, actor

Mike Schwartz is an American screenwriter and actor.

== Life and career ==
Schwartz was born in Boston, Massachusetts, and was raised in Santa Barbara, California. A graduate of the improv group The Groundlings, he lives in Los Angeles as an actor, writer and producer in the entertainment field.

He was a writer and co-executive producer on the NBC/ABC television comedy drama Scrubs from 2001 until 2007. He also appeared on the show in the recurring role of "Lloyd Slawski", a Delivery man and temporary member of the Janitor's "Brain's Trust" who later becomes an ambulance driver. Schwartz later served as a writer on shows such as Big Lake and Bored to Death.
