= Janae Bakken =

American television producer and screenwriter

Janae Bakken is an American television producer and screenwriter best known for her work on the television series Scrubs.

The Minneapolis, Minnesota-born Bakken has worked on Scrubs since 2001, as a writer, and in 2002 served as a story editor, but was promoted and until 2004, served as an executive story editor. From there to 2005, she worked as a co-producer and in 2006 became a producer, and between 2006 and 2007 was supervising producer of twenty episodes. Aside from Scrubs, she has written the 2005 film Artistic License and two episodes during the third season of Malcolm in the Middle.

She once commented that almost all of the ideas brought into and discussed in the Scrubs' writers' room were parallel to the writers' own lives, and that she specifically had suggested a number of storylines and subplots based on her own life. An alumna of Northwestern University she has held a number of lectures at their School of Communication.

== Personal life ==
She married actor Michael Cotter on April 24, 2004; the couple has one child.
