= Eric Weinberg =

American television producer

- Born: 1959 or 1960 (age 65–66)
- Education: Wharton School of the University of Pennsylvania
- Occupations: Television producer Screenwriter

Eric Weinberg (born 1959/1960) is an American television producer and screenwriter best known for his work on the television series Scrubs.

== Biography ==
Weinberg is a graduate of the Wharton School of the University of Pennsylvania. After school, he worked in finance at the investment bank Oppenheimer & Co. In the mid-1990s, he earned his first writing credits.

Weinberg has served as co-executive producer on Scrubs for over a hundred episodes since 2002 and is credited as supervising producer and writer for an additional twenty episodes since the show's debut in 2001. Also notably, he was both the writer and executive producer of the 2005 made-for-television movie Confessions of a Dog, and has both produced and written episodes for the series Graves, Californication and Veronica's Closet. His other credits include writing for the series American Dad, Wilfred, Party Girl, Politically Incorrect and Too Something.

He has been nominated for five Primetime Emmy Awards, two for the crew of Scrubs, and three for Politically Incorrect, which was also nominated for a WGA Award.

== Personal life and allegations of sexual assault ==
On July 14, 2022, Weinberg was arrested by the Los Angeles Police Department on multiple charges of sexual assault between 2012 and 2019. He is being held on bail of $3.225 million.

On March 21, 2024, Weinberg was ordered to stand trial on 28 counts of rape and sexual battery. The charges stemmed from allegations made by several women who testified during a preliminary hearing that Weinberg had approached them in public places under the guise of recruiting models. Many women recounted similar stories of Weinberg inviting them to his home for photo shoots, which escalated into sexual assaults. Some of the women said they were choked during the encounters, and one testified, "I just remember thinking I was going to die."

Weinberg is facing three counts of forcible rape, along with numerous counts of forcible oral copulation, sexual penetration by force, and sexual battery. Judge Charlaine Olmedo ruled that there was sufficient evidence to proceed with a trial on the 28 charges involving eight alleged victims from 2014 to 2019. Four other counts were dismissed, either due to the statute of limitations or insufficient evidence.

Weinberg's defense attorney, Robin Sax, argued for house arrest, but Olmedo denied the request, citing Weinberg's "predatory" behavior and the risk he posed to the public. Prosecutor Marlene Martinez emphasized that Weinberg was "much more dangerous" than someone hiding in the bushes, explaining that he had perfected methods of deception over the years to isolate and assault women.

Weinberg has been in jail since October 2022, after a previous judge revoked his bail. If convicted, he faces multiple life sentences.
