= My Musical =

- Scrubs episode
- Episode no.: Season 6 Episode 6
- Directed by: Will Mackenzie
- Written by: Debra Fordham
- Production code: 607
- Original air date: January 18, 2007

Guest appearances
- Stephanie D'Abruzzo as Patti Miller; Sam Lloyd as Ted Buckland; Robert Maschio as Dr. Todd Quinlan; Aloma Wright as Nurse Laverne Roberts; Philip McNiven as Roy; George Miserlis as Crispin; Paul F. Perry as Randall; Mike Schwartz as Lloyd

Episode chronology
| ← Previous "My Friend With Money" | Next → "His Story IV" |
- Scrubs season 6

"My Musical" is a musical episode of the American television sitcom television series Scrubs. It is the 123rd episode of the show, and was originally aired as the sixth episode of the sixth season on January 18, 2007 on NBC. It was written by Debra Fordham and directed by Will Mackenzie.

The episode follows the story of Patti Miller, (Stephanie D'Abruzzo), a patient who mysteriously starts hearing everyone's speech as singing. It was written by Debra Fordham, who also wrote most of the lyrics. The episode's music was composed by Fordham, Scrubs' resident composer Jan Stevens, The Worthless Peons' Paul Perry, Tony Award-winning Broadway orchestrator Doug Besterman, and the Avenue Q writing team of Jeff Marx and Robert Lopez. The episode was directed by Will Mackenzie.

In 2009, TV Guide ranked "My Musical" #86 on its list of the 100 Greatest Episodes. The episode received five Emmy Award nominations, winning one of them.

== Plot ==
In the style of a traditional musical, this episode follows a two-act structure—with the acts separated by a commercial break instead of an intermission. However, in the style of a traditional Scrubs episode, this is preceded by a cold open.

=== Cold open ===
Turk and Carla are deciding whether Carla should take parental leave from the hospital. Turk says he doesn't mind either way, but as Carla decides she'll take a year off, he starts celebrating.

Then, the scene changes to J.D. and Elliot in the park, when a woman, Patti Miller, abruptly falls unconscious. As she returns to consciousness, she sees Elliot, J.D., and a worried group of onlookers singing to her ("All Right"). When she tries to respond, she sings too. In reality, no one is actually singing; Ms. Miller is hallucinating. She drifts out of consciousness, and wakes up being wheeled out of an ambulance in the parking lot of Sacred Heart Hospital, with all the hospital employees singing to her, "Welcome to Sacred Heart," led by Dr. Kelso.

=== Act one ===
Dr. Cox tells J.D. he believes Ms. Miller is suffering from a psychological problem (as opposed to a neurological one), and tells him to run some tests and "turf her to Psych." Turk and J.D. approach Ms. Miller for a stool sample, explaining that "Everything Comes Down to Poo."

Carla has brought Isabella to the hospital, and everyone is cooing over the new baby, when Elliot comes in and announces happily that she just bought a new house. Turk exits with Isabella, and Elliot expresses concern that J.D. thinks he's moving into the house with her. Carla has decided to take one year parental leave, and Laverne, Ted, and The Worthless Peons wonder how they can go on at the hospital without Carla's help ("Gonna Miss You, Carla"). Carla begins to realize that she does not want to separate herself from her work for so long.

Ms. Miller stops Dr. Cox in the hall to insist that she is not crazy, when they are interrupted by J.D. Cox breaks into a rapid-fire delivery ("The Rant Song") of the litany of annoying things J.D. does, with some help from Janitor. Dr. Cox tells Ms. Miller that if she can get J.D. to leave him alone, she'll get the tests she wants. Ms. Miller yells at J.D., and an impressed Dr. Cox agrees to schedule a CT scan.

Elliot and Carla worry about the difficult conversations they have to have with J.D. and Turk, respectively ("Options"). In the Act One finale ("When the Truth Comes Out"), all the plotlines come together. Dr. Kelso offers Carla her job back, but she worries how to tell Turk. Elliot worries how to tell J.D. he's not moving in. And Ms. Miller goes in for her CT scan, which turns up a gigantic aneurysm in her temporal lobe. Dr. Cox breaks the news to Ms. Miller, pulling a curtain for privacy that also signals the end of the act.

=== Act two ===
Carla and Elliot decide to confront Turk and J.D. Carla thinks that Turk and J.D. will help each other through the respective problems, but Elliot believes that men cannot be open about their feelings. Quite the contrary, Turk and J.D. sing about their "Guy Love." Elliot breaks the news to J.D., who walks out of the room, refusing to talk to her. Carla tells Turk she wants to return to work. Turk responds by saying, "I always thought family was the most important thing to Puerto Ricans." She becomes angry, singing that "For the Last Time, I'm Dominican". Turk tries to explain himself, and finally, agrees to support her decision. Elliot catches up with J.D., feeling awful, and offers to let him move in. He declines, and tells her they'll be "Friends Forever."

Ms. Miller interrupts them, afraid about her upcoming surgery, and asks, "What's Going to Happen?" The staff, led by Dr. Cox reassure her that she will be fine; she finally gets calm and the staff stays by her side when she's taken to surgery; the staff repeats she will be fine, which J.D. qualifies with "we hope," as she goes under anesthesia.

When she awakes, she asks Dr. Cox if the surgery works, but Cox replies "you're gonna have to tell us", and they take a step back; Ms. Miller realized that the surgery was a success, she no longer hears singing, and thanks Dr. Cox and the others. J.D. breaks the moment asking her who was the best singer in her head, much to the rest of the staff's (and especially Dr. Cox's) dismay. J.D. reflects in voiceover that in musicals everyone get what they want, but in reality, after having made a choice we may miss the way things were; as Elliot realizes she misses her roommate, Carla realizes she wishes she spent more time with her daughter, and Ms. Miller realizes she misses the music in her head.

== Production details ==
It had long been a dream in the Scrubs writer's room to do a musical episode. Scrubs creator Bill Lawrence is a self-confessed musical theatre "nerd," as are many of the writers. In addition, many of the cast members have had backgrounds in musical theatre. According to Lawrence, "I knew that Donald [Faison] and Judy [Reyes] were Broadway-style singers and dancers. I knew Sarah [Chalke] could dance, because she danced when she was young. I knew Zach [Braff] loved musical theater. I had actually seen Ken Jenkins in Big River on Broadway when I was a kid. Neil Flynn and John C. McGinley were the last two guys to admit that they'd done a lot of musicals and stuff, but being actors, they had. Johnny C. knew how to do a Gilbert and Sullivan number, and Neil had a big baritone voice."

Scrubs had previously dabbled in the musical genre, including a West Side Story parody in the episode "My Way or the Highway," and a Broadway-style finale in "My Philosophy." However, Lawrence had long been unwilling to do full musical episode, because of difficulties making it "organic to the show," and because of the amount of work that would inevitably be involved. Finally, at the end of Season 5, with Season 6 looking like it would probably be the last season; Lawrence told the writers that if they were ever going to do a musical episode, it should be in Season 6.

Long-time Scrubs writer Debra Fordham took the challenge, and contacted the show's medical consultant, Jonathan Doris, who provided her with several case studies, one of which ("Musical hallucinations associated with seizures originating from an intracranial aneurysm", published in the Mayo Clinic Proceedings) became the basis for Ms. Miller's condition. Unlike most episodes, which were products of the entire writers' room, "My Musical" was written almost entirely by Fordham - including most of the lyrics, even though Fordham had never written lyrics.

The music, however, was not written by Fordham, but rather by several composers, including Paul Perry (a member of The Worthless Peons), Scrubs composer Jan Stevens, and Tony Award-winner Doug Besterman, each of whom helped write and arrange several songs. But, perhaps the most notable contributors were Jeff Marx and Robert Lopez, the writers of hit Broadway musical Avenue Q. Marx and Lopez's involvement came at the suggestion of Braff, who overheard Fordham asking producer Randall Winston if it would be possible to get actual Broadway composers to work on the episode. Fordham did have some contribution to the music, in the form of musical genre suggestions, but during the actual composition process, she and the composers were almost never in the same room.

D'Abruzzo was cast independently of her starring role in Avenue Q. Fordham wrote the part of Ms. Miller with D'Abruzzo in mind after seeing her in the off-Broadway show I Love You Because, after D'Abruzzo had left Avenue Q. In another coincidence, D'Abruzzo had long been a fan of the show, and was overjoyed to have the chance to be on it.

Fordham suggested Will Mackenzie to direct the episode, because of his Broadway experience as Cornelius Hackle in Hello, Dolly! during the show's original Broadway run, opposite Carol Channing. Lance Macdonald, the longtime choreographer of the show, was retained once again for the musical episode.

The filming of the episode was, as expected, a long process. Prior to the episode, the cast underwent a full week of rehearsals, something never before done for a Scrubs episode. A group of eight core dancers were brought in for the dance numbers, while over fifty dancers were involved in the "Welcome To Sacred Heart" scene. There are some notable cameos in the episode, including episode composer Jeff Marx as a pharmacist in "Gonna Miss You, Carla;" occasional Scrubs musical contributor Keren DeBerg as an extra in "Are You Okay?"; and Broadway actress Karen Ziemba (a friend of Mackenzie's) as the neurologist. Further complicating matters was that Judy Reyes had recently fractured her pelvis, and so had to film all her scenes sitting down, and not dancing, aside from her number with Donald Faison ("For the Last Time, I'm Dominican"), which was filmed approximately 2 months after the rest of the episode. The bald cap D'Abruzzo wore during the end of the episode took four hours to put on, and she described it as very uncomfortable.

== Musical numbers ==
Filming "Welcome to Sacred Heart"

The show features ten musical numbers, whose titles appear in the closing credits: "All Right", "Welcome to Sacred Heart", "Everything Comes Down to Poo", "Gonna Miss You, Carla", "The Rant Song", "Options", "When the Truth Comes Out", "Guy Love", "For the Last Time, I'm Dominican", and "Friends Forever/What's Going to Happen".

=== "Welcome to Sacred Heart" ===
"Welcome to Sacred Heart" was composed by Fordham, Marx, and Lopez. Fordham considers "Welcome to Sacred Heart" to be Dr. Kelso's song; Kelso (and especially Jenkins' performance of Kelso) being Sacred Heart's Jerry Orbach/Robert Preston-type showman, as in "Lullaby of Broadway" from 42nd Street. "Be Our Guest" from Beauty and the Beast was also cited as an influence. Filming the sequence involved over 50 extras and Busby Berkeley-style top shot kaleidoscopic choreography, which was achieved with a crane-mounted camera.

=== "Everything Comes Down to Poo" ===
"Everything Comes Down to Poo" was composed by Fordham, Marx, and Lopez. The inspiration for the song came when one of the show's medical advisors, Jonathan Doris, shared his observation with Fordham that stool samples seemed to be asked for at hospitals no matter what was being diagnosed. The number was the latter of two music videos released by NBC on YouTube in advance of the episode's airdate — the other video being “Guy Love.” The videos were deleted on YouTube, but have now reappeared on the website.

The song's lyrics underwent many changes, in order to find the right level of vulgarity. The initial version was much more “genteel,” while later versions included references to "turtleheads" and other slang for feces; as was the line “It may sound gross, it may sound crass, but we need to see what comes out of your ass”; which was changed to “It may sound gross, you may say shush, but we need to see what comes out of your tush.”

=== "Gonna Miss You, Carla" ===
"Gonna Miss You, Carla" was composed by Fordham and Perry (who sings during the song, as a member of The Worthless Peons). D'Abruzzo has called this her favorite song in the episode. Carla sits throughout the song because of Reyes' fractured pelvis. It features most of the secondary characters, including Laverne, Todd, Ted and Doug.

=== "The Rant Song" ===
"The Rant Song" was composed by Fordham and Perry. The song is a Gilbert and Sullivan-style patter song, in order to complement Dr. Cox's normal rapid-fire rants. Bill Lawrence has mentioned "Major-General's Song" from The Pirates of Penzance as a specific influence. "We were mortified because Studio 60 did [a 'Modern Major General' spoof] first. But theirs isn't funny." Fordham has described D'Abruzzo's section in this song as the episode's "Patti LuPone moment." Fordham had long been a LuPone fan (which is the reason D'Abruzzo's character was named Patti Miller).

Janitor's section in this song ("It all started with a penny in the door") refers to an incident in Scrubs' pilot, "My First Day," when he became convinced J.D. had broken a door by wedging a penny in it, an event referenced multiple times throughout the course of the show.

=== "When the Truth Comes Out" ===
"When the Truth Comes Out" was composed by Fordham, Marx, and Lopez. Unlike the other songs in the episode, this song was always intended as a direct parody of a single song: "Do You Hear the People Sing?" from Les Misérables. It also serves the same dramatic purpose as "One Day More": it is a showstopper finale to Act One that reprises all previous songs, summarizes Act One's events, and teases the events to come in Act Two. Carla does not march during this song, except for a few "painful steps" in this sequence, due to Reyes' aforementioned fractured pelvis. When Carla is seen from the back, she is portrayed by a double.

=== "Guy Love" ===
"Guy Love" was composed by Fordham and Perry. It was a late addition to the episode, brought on because, according to Bill Lawrence, "All the modern musicals like Jekyll & Hyde have these really overwrought love songs, so we really wanted to have one between J.D. and Turk." It was the hardest song for Fordham to write. She met with Perry for help with the lyrics, and he gave her the hook, "It's guy love, between two guys." The writing became easier, but she still wanted a reference to a tender moment between Turk and J.D. She emailed D'Abruzzo, whom she knew to be a big fan of the show, "and, no exaggeration, five minutes later, she sent me a list of 30 [moments]", including Turk performing an appendectomy on J.D. in "My Day Off". At first, the song was meant to be a power ballad.

"Guy Love" was the first of two music videos released by NBC on YouTube in advance of the episode's air date — the other being "Everything Comes Down To Poo". The videos have since been removed from YouTube. In addition, the night before "My Musical" aired, actors Zach Braff and Donald Faison appeared on Jimmy Kimmel Live! and after an interview with the host, Braff grabbed a hand held microphone that was hidden in his chair and the two began singing "Guy Love". The song also appeared in "My Road to Nowhere", as Turk's cell phone ring tone for Carla, and as an arranged incidental version in "My Words of Wisdom", and was played as background music while Turk and J.D. hugged in "My Comedy Show". The song was also used in the season 9 premiere "Our First Day of School."

=== "For the Last Time, I'm Dominican" ===
"For the Last Time, I'm Dominican" was composed by Fordham, Perry, and Stevens. Fordham knew she wanted to write a Latin-themed number for Carla, but could not decide on a style; so she "literally was on iTunes listening to every Latin style of music she could think of," before settling on a tango. The song also parodies "Tango: Maureen" from "Rent." The sequence was filmed two months after principal photography, to give Judy Reyes' pelvis enough time to heal for her to be able to tango.

Every question Carla asks during the first verse was an issue in a previous episode - she grew up in Chicago, she was in medicine eight years before meeting Turk, their wedding song was The Beatles' "Eight Days a Week", and Turk struggled with remembering her middle name. Additionally, Turk has called Carla Puerto Rican on several occasions and in "My Last Chance" she angrily responded, "For the last time, Turk, I'm Dominican!"

=== "Friends Forever/What's Going to Happen" ===
"Friends Forever/What's Going to Happen" was composed by Fordham, Marx and Lopez. "Friends Forever" is a parody of 1950s-style musical numbers in general, and "We Go Together" from Grease in particular. However, this was not the original plan. According to Fordham, "I was really shocked when I got the demo back, because I had never envisioned a '50s number. I did mention 'We Go Together,' just as an example of I wanted a cheesy, fun, happy ending kind of a thing."

The song "What's Going to Happen" resembles one of the more "serious" numbers from Rent, specifically "Will I?" and "Life Support". Fordham has called Ms. Miller's solo in "What's Going to Happen" the easiest part of the episode for her to write.

== Soundtrack ==
Scrubs: "My Musical" Soundtrack

Soundtrack album by the Cast of Scrubs
- Released: August 7, 2007
- Genre: Musical
- Length: 20:05
- Label: Hollywood

A digital soundtrack to the episode was released on various music download websites such as the iTunes Store, featuring 11 tracks of songs from the Scrubs episode.

1. "All Right" – 0:43
2. "Welcome to Sacred Heart" – 2:06
3. "Everything Comes Down to Poo" – 2:10
4. "Gonna Miss You Carla" – 2:09
5. "The Rant Song" – 2:25
6. "Options" – 0:17
7. "When the Truth Comes Out" – 2:25
8. "Guy Love" – 2:34
9. "For the Last Time I'm Dominican" – 1:56
10. Finale: "Friends Forever" / "What's Going to Happen" – 2:37
11. "Welcome to Sacred Heart" (Reprise) – 0:43

== Reception ==
The episode received very positive reviews by critics and audiences alike. Many described initial misgivings that the musical concept would make the episode seem gimmicky, but these fears were, for the most part, put to rest by the fact that the episode was "logically insane"; the singing came about organically (through the brain aneurysm), and, despite the singing, the episode fit into the Scrubs continuity. Many noted that the songs fit the characters (like Dr. Cox's "Rant Song"), and that story arcs actually advanced in the episode (Carla returning to the hospital, and J.D. and Elliot no longer living together).

On the other hand, others thought the music felt forced. Inevitably, almost all reviews, both positive and negative, compared the episode to Buffy the Vampire Slayer's musical episode, "Once More, with Feeling". This comparison was also made by Bill Lawrence, who credits Buffy for inspiring Scrubs' propensity for "big" episodes (such as this one, the multi-camera "My Life in Four Cameras", and the Wizard of Oz parody "My Way Home"). The singing abilities of the cast (Chalke in particular) came under some fire, but most critics agreed that most were competent, and that anything beyond that simply did not matter. Reyes and Faison were the only members of the cast (besides the Broadway star D'Abruzzo) to receive praise for their singing abilities. In general, the final assessments were positive. The episode was called "the show's best episode thus far this season", "worth all the hype", and "a heck of a lot of fun". The episode is also the most popular download of the entire series of Scrubs in the iTunes Store.

The episode also received praise from those who worked on it. D'Abruzzo described being on Scrubs as a "really great experience", and called the crew "one of the friendliest crews I've ever worked with". Marx, who had previously had misgivings about working in Hollywood, loved working on the show so much he cited it as influencing his move to Los Angeles. Chalke described the episode as a unifying experience for the struggling show, mentioning that, for the first time in six years, the entire cast and crew met up to watch the episode together.

At the 59th Primetime Emmy Awards, the episode "My Musical" was nominated for five awards in four categories. It received nominations for Outstanding Directing for a Comedy Series (Will Mackenzie), Outstanding Original Music and Lyrics ("Everything Comes Down to Poo" and "Guy Love"), Outstanding Music Direction (Jan Stevens); while it tied for the award for Outstanding Sound Mixing for a Comedy or Drama Series (Half-Hour) and Animation (Joe Foglia, Peter J. Nusbaum, and John W. Cook II) with Entourage. These were Scrubs' only nominations that year.
