= My Way Home (Scrubs) =

- Scrubs episode
- Episode no.: Season 5 Episode 7
- Directed by: Zach Braff
- Written by: Neil Goldman; Garrett Donovan
- Production code: 505
- Original air date: January 24, 2006

Guest appearances
- Christa Miller as Jordan Sullivan; Sam Lloyd as Ted Buckland; Robert Maschio as Dr. Todd Quinlan; Johnny Kastl as Dr. Doug Murphy; Travis Schuldt as Keith Dudemeister; Aloma Wright as Nurse Laverne Roberts; David Downs as Mr. Bolger; Philip McNiven as Roy; Paul F. Perry as Randall

Episode chronology
← Previous "My Missed Perception"	Next → "My Big Bird"
- Scrubs season 5

"My Way Home" is the seventh episode of fifth season and the 100th episode of the American television sitcom Scrubs. Written by Neil Goldman and Garrett Donovan, and directed by series main star Zach Braff, it originally aired on January 24, 2006 on NBC.

The episode's references to The Wizard of Oz were called a "sly, circuitous homage" when Scrubs received a Peabody Award in 2006 for "fearlessly smashing traditional comic formulas, all the while respecting the deepest emotional and moral issues of its life-and-death setting."

== Plot ==
On his day off, J.D. gets called into work by Keith. It turns out that Dr. Cox told Keith to call J.D. to let him see what it feels like to be pestered over little things, as J.D. had done to Cox as an intern. Laverne's gospel choir is also present, singing a song called "Payback is a Bitch". Elliot is basking in the warmth of being seen as an endocrinology expert by her interns. In reality, however, around the hospital she is hiding pages of notes and books with the answers on them. Turk attempts to convince a family to take their brain-dead son off life support so the hospital can perform its first on-site heart transplant, in which Turk will be allowed to assist if he is successful in persuading the family. Meanwhile, Carla jumps at the opportunity to look after Dr. Cox's young son Jack.

However, the crew finds challenges awaiting them. J.D. just wants to head home and is constantly waylaid by requests for assistance. Elliot is forced to conduct a seminar with several endocrinology specialists. Turk's dishonesty with the coma patient's family damages his credibility. Carla can't stand having Jack around and begins to doubt if she's cut out to be a parent.

Eventually, all of J.D.'s friends discover they already had what they were looking for all along. Elliot finds that she has been unknowingly memorizing her notes and therefore already has the "brains" to go to the meeting. Turk, after being completely honest with the coma patient's parents, convinces them to pull the plug and learns the coma patient carried a donor card allowing the "heart" transplant. Carla learns from Dr. Cox that she'll feel different about her own child than she does other people's and will find the "courage" she needs. Later, as they put their skills to good use, J.D. is finally allowed to go home.

== Homage ==
The episode is an homage to the 1939 MGM musical film adaptation of L. Frank Baum's The Wonderful Wizard of Oz. Some references are obvious, such as The Worthless Peons singing both "We're Off to See the Wizard" and "Over the Rainbow", the "yellow brick road" painted on the hospital floor, and J.D.'s red shoes.

Several memorable lines from the film are echoed. Dr. Cox tells Elliot her endocrinology answers are "falling from the sky". Dr. Cox tells Carla to "pay no attention to the man behind the curtain" while cleaning his son. Dr. Cox calls Jordan the "Wicked Witch of the East Wing". Janitor mumbles "oil can". Todd talks about the zoo's "lions and tigers and bears — oh my!" Also, J.D. simply wants to go home (the yellow line leading to the exit), and when he does get to leave, there is a rainbow in the sky. From the point where the yellow line on the hospital floor is visualized as a yellow brick road, the rest of the episode is shot in bright, highly saturated colors, similar to the Technicolor in which The Wizard of Oz was filmed (with the Kansas scenes shot in black and white).

The episode also makes some more subtle references, including various character names:

- Mr. Fleming is the first patient mentioned; Victor Fleming directed the original movie.
- One patient is Mr. Baum; the book "The Wizard of Oz" was written by L. Frank Baum.
- Another patient is Mr. Langley. Noel Langley wrote the screenplay for the movie.
- The potential heart donor's name is Ray Bolger, which is based on the actor with the same name who played the Scarecrow in The Wizard of Oz.
- The psychologist who killed himself was Dr. Burke; Billie Burke played Glinda.

References include:

- Dr. Cox's nickname for J.D. is "Dorothy"
- J.D. listening to the song Africa by the band 'Toto', on his iPod.
- Dr. Cox refers to Elliot's straw-colored hair.
- Janitor, while painting the hallway lines around the hospital, spray paints J.D.'s sneakers red (symbolizing the ruby slippers).
- At the 12:54 mark, the four main characters follow a yellow line while Ted's band sings "We're Off to See the Wizard". At this moment, the color saturation changes from normal to extremely vivid - mimicking the movie's transition from black and white to color.
- Dr. Cox tells the interns to "Flee - now!" The Wicked Witch of the West told the monkeys to "Fly - now!"
- Turk and the nurses "pop up" like the munchkins do.
- Jordan is stuck in a hot room and seems to be "melting" as the witch does when she gets doused with water.
- Carla mentions, "I'm supposed to be the brave one," just as the "king of the forest" is supposed to be.
- J.D., telling Turk he's on his own, just wants to take "Toto" and go home.
- Jack is painted green, referencing the skin color of the Wicked Witch of the West.
- Dr. Kelso mentions that the depressed staff psychologist had hanged himself. This is a reference to an urban legend about a depressed munchkin actor hanging himself on the set of the Wizard of Oz.
- Carla finds Dr. Cox behind a curtain and he tells her, "Pay no attention to the man behind the curtain."
- Todd tells Laverne that he saw lions, tigers, and bears at the zoo. Then he passes a cheerleader and says, "Oh My!"
- Janitor asks Carla for the oil can when he has something in his mouth and his hands are full.

== DVD version ==
The first cut of the episode, from before it was edited for broadcast, is featured on the DVD box set for Season 5. It contains scenes that weren't broadcast and different versions of scenes that were, alongside a commentary by Zach Braff, who directed the episode.
