= Scrubs season 5 =

Scrubs
- Season 5
- DVD cover
- Showrunner: Bill Lawrence
- No. of episodes: 24

Release
- Original network: NBC
- Original release: January 3 – May 16, 2006

Season chronology
- ← Previous; Season 4 Next → Season 6

The fifth season of the American comedy television series Scrubs premiered on NBC on January 3, 2006 and concluded on May 16, 2006 and consists of 24 episodes. For the first twelve episodes, two new episodes were broadcast back-to-back every Tuesday at 9:00 p.m. ET. Then NBC returned to broadcasting one new episode every week (at 9:00 p.m. ET), followed by a rerun. For the first three weeks of this, the rerun episode was a cast favorite episode, with available audio commentary tracks on NBC's website to accompany the episodes. Guest stars in the fifth included Jason Bateman and Mandy Moore, as well the introduction of new recurring characters played by Elizabeth Banks and Travis Schuldt. This season was nominated for the Primetime Emmy Award for Outstanding Comedy Series.

Season 5 begins with J.D. (Zach Braff) living in a hotel. He has become an attending physician now on the same level as Dr. Cox (John C. McGinley). In the season premiere, Elliot (Sarah Chalke) has taken a new fellowship in another hospital, only to be fired in the next episode. Elliot then returns to Sacred Heart and becomes an attending. Turk (Donald Faison) and Carla (Judy Reyes) are trying to have a baby, despite Turk still having doubts. Finally, some new interns have arrived at Sacred Heart, chief among them being Keith Dudemeister (Schuldt). Season 5 also focuses on the relationship between J.D. and Dr. Cox, who now find themselves equals.

== Cast and characters ==
=== Main cast ===
- Zach Braff as Dr. John "J.D." Dorian
- Sarah Chalke as Dr. Elliot Reid
- Donald Faison as Dr. Chris Turk
- Neil Flynn as Janitor
- Ken Jenkins as Dr. Bob Kelso
- John C. McGinley as Dr. Perry Cox
- Judy Reyes as Nurse Carla Espinosa

=== Recurring roles ===
- Travis Schuldt as Keith Dudemeister
- Robert Maschio as Dr. Todd Quinlan
- Christa Miller as Jordan Sullivan
- Sam Lloyd as Ted Buckland
- Aloma Wright as Nurse Laverne Roberts
- Johnny Kastl as Dr. Doug Murphy
- Michael Learned as Patricia Wilk

=== Guest stars ===
- Elizabeth Banks as Dr. Kim Briggs
- Jay Kenneth Johnson as Dr. Matthews
- Mandy Moore as Julie Quinn
- Paul Adelstein as Dr. Stone
- Jason Bateman as Mr. Sutton
- Tom Cavanagh as Dan Dorian
- Alexander Chaplin as Sam Thompson
- Dave Foley as Dr. Lester Hedrick
- Cheryl Hines as Paige Cox
- Josh Randall as Jake
- Nicole Sullivan as Jill Tracy
- The Blanks as the Worthless Peons

== Production ==
Both Gabrielle Allan and Matt Tarses, two writers since the first season, left at the end of season 4. Eric Weinberg left in the middle of season 5 to work on a pilot. Tim Hobert and Tad Quill were promoted to executive producers mid-season. The staff writer of season 4 did not return for season 5. Kevin Biegel and Aseem Batra were hired as staff writers for this season.

=== Writing staff ===
- Bill Lawrence – executive producer/head writer
- Tim Hobert – co-executive producer (episodes 1–12) / executive producer/assistant head writer (episodes 13–24)
- Tad Quill – co-executive producer (episodes 1–12) / executive producer/assistant head writer (episodes 13–24)
- Neil Goldman and Garrett Donovan – co-executive producers
- Bill Callahan – co-executive producer
- Eric Weinberg – co-executive producer (episodes 1–12)
- Mike Schwartz – supervising producer
- Debra Fordham – producer
- Mark Stegemann – producer
- Janae Bakken – producer
- Angela Nissel – consulting producer
- Kevin Biegel – staff writer
- Aseem Batra – staff writer

=== Production staff ===
- Bill Lawrence – executive producer/showrunner
- Randall Winston – producer
- Liz Newman – co-producer (episodes 1–12) / producer (episodes 13–24)
- Danny Rose – associate producer (episodes 1–12) / co-producer (episodes 13–24)

=== Directors ===
Includes directors who directed 2 or more episodes, or directors who are part of the cast and crew

- Bill Lawrence (4 episodes)
- Michael Spiller (2 episodes)
- Linda Mendoza (2 episodes)
- John Inwood (2 episodes)
- Victor Nelli, Jr. (2 episodes)
- Zach Braff (1 episode)
- Randall Winston (producer) (1 episode)
- Rick Blue (editor) (1 episode)
- John Michel (editor) (1 episode)
- Richard Alexander Wells (assistant director) (1 episode)

== Episodes ==
Scrubs season 5 episodes
No. overall	No. in season	Title	Directed by	Written by	Original release date	Prod. code	U.S. viewers (millions)
94	1	"My Intern's Eyes"	Bill Lawrence	Bill Lawrence	January 3, 2006	501	7.69
Now an attending physician, J.D. has to deal with his own interns as Dr. Cox tests whether he is still willing to bend the rules despite more responsibility. A new intern named Keith begins his first day at Sacred Heart. Turk hesitates at the thought of Carla getting pregnant. Meanwhile, Elliot starts her fellowship at County Hospital and tries not to appear foolish.
95	2	"My Rite of Passage"	Bill Lawrence	Janae Bakken	January 3, 2006	502	7.84
Despite trying to do the opposite, J.D. finds himself treating his interns poorly after discovering they laugh at his jokes out of fear. The hospital staff attempt to avoid Jordan to drive her away, and Elliot's fellowship abruptly ends. The episode guest stars Alexander Chaplin as Sam Thompson.
96	3	"My Day at the Races"	Michael Spiller	Eric Weinberg	January 10, 2006	503	6.87
Trying to complete a list of goals before his 30th birthday, J.D. signs up for a triathlon. Meanwhile, Turk takes on a patient who wishes to be hypnotized instead of put under anesthesia during surgery, and Elliot finds she and Jake (Josh Randall) know little about each other. J.D. and Elliot move in together.
97	4	"My Jiggly Ball"	Rick Blue	Tim Hobert	January 10, 2006	504	6.87
J.D. struggles to find something positive to talk about when assigned to introduce Dr. Kelso at an awards dinner, especially after Kelso chooses a wealthier patient for a drug trial after promising the opportunity to another. Carla and Turk attempt to help Elliot, stuck working in a free clinic, get her job at Sacred Heart back. Everyone except for J.D. seems to know of a game called "Jiggly Ball".
98	5	"My New God"	Victor Nelli, Jr.	Aseem Batra	January 17, 2006	506	5.87
Dr. Cox's born-again Christian sister, Paige Cox (Cheryl Hines), visits the hospital and wants him to participate in his son's baptism: Dr. Cox wants nothing to do with it or her for that matter. Elliot tries to convince Turk why Carla finds babymaking to be romantic. The Janitor and J.D. begin a friendship, which is sabotaged by one of Janitor's more elaborate pranks. The song playing during the Janitor's "Evil Stare" is "Koyaanisqatsi" by Philip Glass, with "In the Sun" by Joseph Arthur playing through the ending scene.
99	6	"My Missed Perception"	Bill Lawrence	Kevin Biegel	January 17, 2006	507	5.93
J.D. has to deal with the consequences when he mistakes a patient's reaction to her approaching death as a wish to end treatment. Carla desperately tries to gather the hospital staff for a group photo, while Turk and Elliot try to discover the cause of a patient's mysterious and unexplainable pain. The episode features a cameo appearance by Gary Busey.
100	7	"My Way Home"	Zach Braff	Neil Goldman & Garrett Donovan	January 24, 2006	505	5.45
J.D. gets called in to work on his day off, but the only thing he wants to do is get home. Meanwhile Elliot tries to convince everyone she is an expert on endocrinology following her brief fellowship, Carla has doubts over being a parent, and Turk has to wrestle over an issue that will either help his career or break his conscience.
101	8	"My Big Bird"	Rob Greenberg	Debra Fordham	January 24, 2006	508	5.73
J.D., Elliot, Turk and Carla are all formally interrogated following the death of a patient, where it is learned that J.D. and Turk were unnecessarily visiting a patient's home, Carla was gathering the staff to purchase lottery tickets in a group effort, and Elliot was dealing with the wife of a married man she kissed. The episode guest stars Jason Bateman as Mr. Sutton and Peter Jacobson as Mr. Foster.
102	9	"My Half-Acre"	Linda Mendoza	Bill Callahan	February 7, 2006	509	6.17
J.D. is set up on a blind date with a patient's niece and tries to take Elliot's advice to avoid scaring her off. Meanwhile, Turk joins the hospital air-band, but when he steps on Dr. Kelso's toes, he has to learn to swallow his pride. Dr. Cox worries about being an unsatisfactory father. The episode guest stars Mandy Moore as Julie Quinn.
103	10	"Her Story II"	Chris Koch	Mike Schwartz	February 7, 2006	510	7.10
Narrated from Carla's viewpoint: J.D. lets the little things bother him with Julie, but just as he gets over them, the big things make themselves plain. Meanwhile, Carla gets a fertility test when a new nurse makes her feel even older. The episode features a cameo appearance by Billy Dee Williams.
104	11	"My Buddy's Booty"	Randall Winston	Mark Stegemann	February 28, 2006	511	6.73
J.D. and Elliot, worried about their favorite patient Mrs. Wilk undergoing a risky procedure — and J.D. still having trouble getting over Julie — both agree to find a booty call, but his suggestion backfires when Elliot chooses J.D.'s nemesis/intern, Keith. Carla encourages Turk to fight for a female-friendly hospital gym, and Dr. Cox and the Janitor strike a lopsided friendship over drinks.
105	12	"My Cabbage"	John Inwood	Ryan A. Levin	February 28, 2006	512	8.20
J.D. tries relentlessly to get rid of Keith while sticking up for his favorite intern, "Cabbage", while the staff says goodbye to Mrs. Wilk. The Janitor keeps a magpie in the hospital which proves very adept at stealing things, much to Dr. Kelso's displeasure. The episode features a cameo appearance by Kareem Abdul-Jabbar.
106	13	"My Five Stages"	Jay Alaimo	Tad Quill	March 7, 2006	513	5.71
When the hospital's favorite patient Mrs. Wilk is told she will die after getting an infection, Dr. Cox and J.D. seem to go through the five stages of grief as well. Meanwhile, Elliot realizes that her booty call Keith has become more than a booty call, and the Janitor and Ted team up to give Dr. Kelso a taste of his own medicine. The episode guest stars Dave Foley as Dr. Hedrick.
107	14	"My Own Personal Hell"	Adam Bernstein	Eren Celeboglu	March 14, 2006	514	5.80
Dr. Cox is named the best doctor in the area in a leading publication. Dr. Cox struggles to treat an unnervingly rude and haughty patient who is a friend of Dr. Kelso's. After struggling to conceive, Carla, who has already taken a fertility test, questions Turk's fertility and tries to "spermjack" him to find out. Elliot finds out J.D. does not like Keith.
108	15	"My Extra Mile"	Ken Whittingham	Mark Stegemann	March 21, 2006	515	5.84
J.D. encourages his colleagues to go the extra mile with their patients. This causes a dilemma as J.D. is torn between sticking to his principles and losing a very attractive girlfriend who is only interested in him because of his hair. Turk and Carla are having trouble making a baby, and a doctor attributes it to the stress they are under. Turk is worried about getting a permanent position when he finds out he is the fourth most-skilled surgeon.
109	16	"My Bright Idea"	Michael Spiller	Janae Bakken	March 28, 2006	517	6.75
J.D. and Turk find out that Carla is pregnant before she does, and J.D. convinces Turk to tell the entire hospital staff in order to surprise Carla. Carla, however, reveals that upon hearing the news of pregnancy, her biggest joy will be to tell her friends one by one. J.D. gets the Janitor to swallow a GPS tracker.
110	17	"My Chopped Liver"	Will Mackenzie	Debra Fordham	April 4, 2006	516	6.23
Carla is forced to do Kelso's job, saying "no" to people's requests. J.D.'s patient who needs a liver transplant recovers, but his brother, who donated, gets worse. Dr. Cox is forced to attend a couples' dinner with Elliot and Keith, with the result that the other interns try to befriend him as well (much to J.D.'s dismay). J.D. himself gets in the way of "Turk Time", causing resentment from his best friend. The episode's storyline regarding a liver transplant led to a nomination at The Sentinel for Health Awards in 2006 in the primetime comedy section.
111	18	"My New Suit"	Victor Nelli, Jr.	Tim Hobert	April 11, 2006	518	5.92
J.D. finds himself constantly lying in order not to hurt the feelings of his visiting brother Dan (Tom Cavanagh). Carla and Turk cannot decide on baby names. Dr. Cox is forced to work with Ted after a conversation with Kelso goes wrong.
112	19	"His Story III"	John Inwood	Angela Nissel	April 18, 2006	519	5.72
Narrated by The Janitor: J.D. begins a video postcard for his mother but gets locked in a water tower for the day by the Janitor. Finding himself with free time, the Janitor bonds with a severely quadriplegic patient who cannot communicate. Elliot and Carla argue over an intern's mistake. Turk is embarrassed by his impending fatherhood when Dr. Cox accuses him of having a stereotypically white personality.
113	20	"My Lunch"	John Michel	Tad Quill	April 25, 2006	520	6.00
After repeatedly running into annoying recurring patient Jill Tracy (Nicole Sullivan), J.D. feels guilty when she dies of an apparent drug overdose and he did not act on warning signs. Carla and Elliot convince Todd to admit to being gay, but contrary to what they had hoped, this does not change his personality for the better. Dr. Cox consoles J.D. by telling him he should not take patients' deaths personally. Three patients, one of whom is a friend of Dr. Cox, receive transplant organs from Jill Tracy, which later turn out to be infected by rabies. All three patients die, causing Dr. Cox to break down, blaming himself for their deaths. The plot is based on the May and June 2004 deaths of four Texas patients who received donor organs from a patient whose cause of death was originally determined to be a cocaine overdose, but later turned out to be rabies.
114	21	"My Fallen Idol"	Joanna Kerns	Bill Callahan	May 2, 2006	521	5.07
Feeling guilty over the deaths of three patients, Dr. Cox comes to work drunk and is forced to take a leave of absence. The Sacred Heart staff organize shifts to visit Cox at home and console him in the hope of his return, but initially, J.D. refuses to take part. Eventually, J.D. heads to Cox to console him and lift him up, telling him that it would have been nearly impossible to have caught the problem ahead of time, and that had he been in the position, he would have made the same call to rush the organs, as it was the right thing to do seeing as two of them wanted only to help them as soon as possible. That and the support of all his co-workers, was enough to bring Cox out of his slump. Meanwhile, Turk begins a new orthopedic rotation, but struggles to connect with his new, overly sensitive attending. The episode guest stars Paul Adelstein as Dr. Stone.
115	22	"My Déjà Vu, My Déjà Vu"	Linda Mendoza	Mike Schwartz	May 9, 2006	522	6.20
After five years working at Sacred Heart, J.D. gets the impression that the same events keep unfolding at Sacred Heart. Dr Cox, returning to work, seems to have lost his self-confidence and Elliot takes it upon herself to help him regain it. Turk annoys Carla by doing the things she cannot while pregnant.
116	23	"My Urologist"	Richard Alexander Wells	Neil Goldman & Garrett Donovan	May 16, 2006	523	6.19
J.D. begins to fall for Dr. Kim Briggs (Elizabeth Banks), a urologist who has supposedly always been present but was invisible to J.D. because she wore a wedding ring. She shares a patient with J.D., but when Dr. Cox reveals that she is refusing to do a risky surgery to keep her statistics up, he begins to have mixed feelings. Elliot considers breaking up with Keith after he refuses to stand up for himself, but Carla, amid her pregnancy hormones, tries to save the relationship. Meanwhile, Dr. Kelso decides to trust the Janitor to fetch cash from a deposit at home, which he regrets. During the opening title sequence, Dr. Kim Briggs steps into the credits and switches the X-ray around, saying, "That's backwards, it's been bugging me for years."
117	24	"My Transition"	Bill Lawrence	Aseem Batra & Kevin Biegel	May 16, 2006	524	6.57
J.D. and Kim's romance escalates when they go on their first date, but Elliot will not give them much time alone, as she is becoming good friends with Kim too. Dr. Cox and Jordan celebrate as Jack moves out of diapers by giving his baby things away at Carla's baby shower but learn that Jordan is pregnant again. Later when J.D. goes to talk to Kim, she reveals that she is pregnant.

== The Turk dance ==
The ninth episode of the season, "My Half-Acre", famously features a scene where Turk, in an attempt to audition for the Janitor's band, proceeds to pull off an impromptu dance. In 2017, the dance would be referred to as the "Default Dance" in the popular video game Fortnite, called so as it is the default dance emote that is applied to the player character. Faison stated that the dance was his own creation and could have been copyrighted, however he did not see the need to, and thus, does not receive any royalties from Epic Games (the company that developed Fortnite) for its use.
