= My Last Words (Scrubs) =

- Scrubs episode
- Episode no.: Season 8 Episode 2
- Directed by: Bill Lawrence
- Written by: Aseem Batra
- Production code: 802
- Original air date: January 6, 2009

Guest appearances
- Courteney Cox as Dr. Taylor Maddox; Glynn Turman as George Valentine; Aziz Ansari as Ed Dhandapani; Eliza Coupe as Dr. Denise Mahoney; Sam Lloyd as Ted Buckland; Christa Miller as Jordan Sullivan; Deonte Gordon as Shawn; Darren Hanvey as Doctor; Manley Henry as Snoop Dogg Attending

Episode chronology
← Previous "My Jerks"	Next → "My Saving Grace"
- Scrubs season 8

"My Last Words" is the second episode of the eighth season and the 152nd overall episode of the American television sitcom Scrubs. Written by Aseem Batra and directed by series creator Bill Lawrence, it originally aired on January 6, 2009, on ABC, immediately after the season's first episode, "My Jerks", that same evening. The episode was awarded the 2010 Humanitas Prize in the 30 Minute Category.

== Plot ==
The episode begins as Turk and J.D. are making plans for the continuation of their "bro-mantic" tradition, "Steak Night", but plans are put on hold when they encounter George Valentine (Glynn Turman), a terminally ill patient with ischemic bowel disease who will probably die in the night. George convinces J.D. and Turk to leave the hospital by saying he will be getting visited by his family shortly, putting him in Denise's care. Turk and J.D. return after finding out that George has lied to them and has no family to comfort him, relieving Denise of her duties. J.D. and Turk decide to stay and talk George through his fears of death. George mentions that he would like a beer after being denied a cigar, sending J.D. and Turk out on a beer run (in which they also purchase a flare gun and a box of condoms so as to not "seem like losers for purchasing one can of beer").

The night soon turns into an evening of talking about life and death in an effort to comfort George. He initially finds it hard to open up to Turk and J.D. but soon finds comfort in the company that they bring. George questions J.D. and Turk about death and how his will occur, highlighting the duo's own fears of passing in the process, but eventually finding some happiness. George soon becomes drowsy and falls asleep, asking J.D. and Turk if they'll be around when he wakes up, to which they reply yes. He does not wake up, and Turk and J.D. celebrate their meeting and honor his passing on the roof of the hospital by shooting off the flare gun.

== Production ==
This episode did not feature Dr. Cox, Dr. Kelso, Janitor, or Elliot. The only major characters appearing were J.D., Turk, and Carla (but only in one of J.D.'s fantasies). This is the first time the Janitor has not appeared in an episode since "My Lucky Day".

== Reception ==
The Season 8 premiere of Scrubs was run by ABC in an hour long slot comprising two separate episodes, "My Jerks" and "My Last Words". Scrubs obtained 6.7 million viewers for this hour long slot, around as many as the season 7 premiere on NBC. The two episodes together were the two most viewed shows in the 18-49 demographic.
