= Scrubs season 6 =

Scrubs
- Season 6
- DVD cover
- Showrunner: Bill Lawrence
- No. of episodes: 22

Release
- Original network: NBC
- Original release: November 30, 2006 – May 17, 2007

Season chronology
- ← Previous; Season 5 Next → Season 7

The sixth season of the American comedy television series Scrubs premiered on NBC on November 30, 2006 and concluded on May 17, 2007 and consists of 22 episodes. The series moved to Thursdays at 9:00 pm as a part of NBC's Comedy Night Done Right. Guest stars in the sixth season included Keri Russell and Michael Weston. This season featured the series' musical episode, "My Musical".

Over the course of the season, J.D. (Zach Braff) and the other characters must mature to fill the different roles required of them. J.D., for instance, is cast in the role of expecting father since his girlfriend, Dr. Kim Briggs (Elizabeth Banks), is pregnant with his child. Turk (Donald Faison) and Carla (Judy Reyes) become parents when Carla gives birth to their daughter, Isabella Turk. Elliot (Sarah Chalke) plans her wedding to Keith (Travis Schuldt), although she and J.D. still harbor feelings for each other. Dr. Cox (John C. McGinley), as father of two children with Jordan (Christa Miller), struggles to prevent his foul disposition from affecting his parenting. Important issues are touched upon, such as the importance of leadership, whether everything happens for a reason, and even death.

== Cast and characters ==
=== Main cast ===
- Zach Braff as Dr. John "J.D." Dorian
- Sarah Chalke as Dr. Elliot Reid
- Donald Faison as Dr. Chris Turk
- Neil Flynn as The Janitor
- Ken Jenkins as Dr. Bob Kelso
- John C. McGinley as Dr. Perry Cox
- Judy Reyes as Nurse Carla Espinosa

=== Recurring roles ===
- Sam Lloyd as Ted Buckland
- Robert Maschio as Dr. Todd Quinlan
- Travis Schuldt as Keith Dudemeister
- Aloma Wright as Nurse Laverne Roberts
- Christa Miller as Jordan Sullivan
- Elizabeth Banks as Dr. Kim Briggs
- Johnny Kastl as Dr. Doug Murphy
- Mike Schwartz as Lloyd the Delivery Guy

=== Guest stars ===
- Jay Kenneth Johnson as Dr. Matthews
- Michael Weston as Brian Dancer
- Keri Russell as Melody O'Harra
- Alexander Chaplin as Sam Thompson
- Stephanie D'Abruzzo as Patti Miller
- Dave Foley as Dr. Lester Hedrick
- Nicole Sullivan as Jill Tracy
- The Blanks as the Worthless Peons
- Benjamin King as Miloš' Radovicnouizicioiuizcinicizich'l
- Troy Kotsur as Mr. Frances

== Production ==
Season Six saw more writers leave. Tim Hobert left after the first three episodes, as did Tad Quill. Gabrielle Allan returned as a consulting producer for the first half season. Clarence Livingston was hired as a story editor. Andy Schwartz and Dave Tennant were hired as staff writers. Even though Eric Weinberg and Sean Russell each wrote an episode this season, they were not part of the writing staff. Weinberg returned to write just that episode. Russell was the script coordinator, who was given the opportunity to write an episode.

=== Writing staff ===
- Bill Lawrence – executive producer/head writer
- Neil Goldman and Garrett Donovan – executive producers/assistant head writers
- Bill Callahan – co-executive producer (episodes 1–3) / executive producer/assistant head writer (episodes 4–22)
- Tad Quill – executive producer/assistant head writer (episodes 1–3)
- Mike Schwartz – co-executive producer
- Debra Fordham – supervising producer
- Mark Stegemann – supervising producer
- Janae Bakken – supervising producer
- Angela Nissel – consulting producer
- Gabrielle Allan – consulting producer (episodes 1–10)
- Tim Hobert – executive producer/assistant head writer (episode 1) / consulting producer (episodes 2–3)
- Kevin Biegel – story editor
- Aseem Batra – story editor
- Clarence Livingston – story editor
- Dave Tennant – staff writer
- Andy Schwartz – staff writer

=== Production staff ===
- Bill Lawrence – executive producer/showrunner
- Randall Winston – producer
- Liz Newman – producer
- Danny Rose – co-producer

=== Directors ===
Includes directors who directed 2 or more episodes, or directors who are part of the cast and crew

- John Putch (4 episodes)
- Linda Mendoza (2 episodes)
- John Inwood (2 episodes)
- Victor Nelli, Jr. (2 episodes)
- Bill Lawrence (1 episode)
- Zach Braff (1 episode)
- Michael McDonald (1 episode)
- Rick Blue (editor) (1 episode)
- John Michel (editor) (1 episode)
- Richard Alexander Wells (assistant director) (1 episode)
- Mark Stegemann (writer) (1 episode)
- Richard Davis (camera operator) (1 episode)

== Episodes ==
Scrubs season 6 episodes
No. overall	No. in season	Title	Directed by	Written by	Original release date	Prod. code	U.S. viewers (millions)
118	1	"My Mirror Image"	John Inwood	Tim Hobert	November 30, 2006	601	7.72
J.D. attempts to avoid confronting Kim (Elizabeth Banks) about her pregnancy. Dr. Cox attempts to deal with his anger issues, both at home and at work. Elliot is having trouble being the only one in the group with no child on the way. The Janitor questions the purpose of his life.
119	2	"My Best Friend's Baby's Baby and My Baby's Baby"	Gail Mancuso	Neil Goldman & Garrett Donovan	December 7, 2006	603	8.38
Carla goes into labour, but Turk is overshadowed by Elliot in his attempts to support Carla. J.D. and Kim discuss their options for their baby, whether or not they should seek an abortion. Jordan gets angry at Dr. Cox for treating their son Jack like his "drinking buddy".
120	3	"My Coffee"	Rick Blue	Tad Quill	December 14, 2006	602	7.73
J.D. tries to find out how compatible he and Kim are. Turk gives medical advice for fees after learning that Carla might want to become a stay-at-home mom and Elliot is tortured by Dr. Cox as she considers going into private practice. When Dr. Kelso allows a "Coffee Bucks" franchise to be built onto the hospital, Janitor leads a strike of the Sacred Heart supporting staff, demanding the same dental insurance that the coffee workers are receiving.
121	4	"My House"	John Putch	Bill Callahan	January 4, 2007	604	7.29
Dr. Cox feels like the TV character House when he has to solve several mysteries. One of them is that Elliot is angry at Dr. Kelso, but is taking her anger out on Turk for some reason. Carla is showing early signs of postpartum depression, while J.D. tries to be a better boyfriend for Kim and at the same time has to solve the problem of a heart-failure-patient who is apparently healthy, and Turk and Dr. Cox find another mystery when a patient's husband is "as orange as an NBA gameball". The episode guest stars Dave Foley as Dr. Hedrick.
122	5	"My Friend with Money"	John Michel	Gabrielle Allan	January 11, 2007	605	7.77
Elliot is enjoying private practice a little too much, causing J.D. and Dr. Cox to show a little jealousy. Carla's post-partum depression symptoms worsen. Dr. Cox and Janitor try to co-exist in the hospital's new luxury suite.
123	6	"My Musical"	Will Mackenzie	Debra Fordham	January 18, 2007	607	6.48
The arrival of a patient (Stephanie D'Abruzzo) who hears music all the time results in Sacred Heart turning into a full-scale Broadway musical. Elliot tries to tell J.D. that she does not want to be roommates with him any more, while Carla attempts to decide whether she should return to work or not.
124	7	"His Story IV"	Linda Mendoza	Mike Schwartz	February 1, 2007	606	6.90
Narrated from Dr. Kelso's viewpoint. Dr. Kelso befriends a soldier, Private Brian Dancer (Michael Weston) being treated at Sacred Heart, the war stories he brings back from Iraq remind Kelso what it means to be a good leader. Meanwhile, the soldier's presence in the hospital causes a heated political debate, dividing the staffers, and while everyone is fighting the patient's wellbeing is being neglected. Elsewhere, J.D. is in search of a new apartment and feels out of the loop when politics become the topic of the day at Sacred Heart.
125	8	"My Road to Nowhere"	Mark Stegemann	Mark Stegemann	February 8, 2007	608	6.25
Turk convinces J.D. that he needs to go to Tacoma for Kim's first ultrasound, which results in an impromptu road trip for the Sacred Heart crew. After commandeering Dr. Kelso's new RV, Rowdy, Elliot, Carla, Keith, Ted and the Janitor join the father to be on his journey. Meanwhile, Dr. Cox and Jordan face some concern when her ultrasound reveals that their unborn child will need to have surgery.
126	9	"My Perspective"	John Putch	Angela Nissel	February 15, 2007	609	6.23
When J.D. develops vasovagal syncope, a condition which results in fainting or blackouts, he finds himself not only having to deal with losing his girlfriend and his apartment, but also his consciousness. Elliot and Turk debate over whose turn it is to take care of the always luckless attending, while Carla tries out her new excuse: "I have a baby." Elsewhere, the Janitor embarks on a cruise vacation. Also, Miloš, an established surgeon in his war-torn home country, comes to Sacred Heart and angers Turk by showing greater surgical experience than him.
127	10	"My Therapeutic Month"	Ken Whittingham	Aseem Batra	February 22, 2007	610	5.66
J.D. likes a sexy new physical therapist but because of his unfortunate circumstances, he finds it difficult to ask her out. Meanwhile, Turk breaks his arm and Dr. Kelso sends him back to residency where, with the help of Dr. Cox, he realizes that he knows less about actual medicine than he thought he did. Elsewhere, Elliot invites Keith to move in with her, but is not quite ready to compromise her house rules. All the while Carla provides each of the doctors with guidance while they get over their fear, ignorance and stubbornness.
128	11	"My Night to Remember"	Richard Davis	Debra Fordham	March 1, 2007	614	6.76
While helping a patient regain his memory, the staff at Sacred Heart stir up some memories of their own. J.D., Elliot, Turk, Carla, Dr. Cox, Dr. Kelso and Janitor take a trip down memory lane in this clip show of six years of Scrubs.
129	12	"My Fishbowl"	Chris Koch	Kevin Biegel	March 8, 2007	611	5.84
The day has come for Private Brian Dancer to be released from Sacred Heart, but when the military informs him that his injuries are too severe to return to service he spirals into a state of depression. Elliot, J.D. and Turk rally around him to boost his spirit. Meanwhile, Dr. Cox informs Carla that her jokes are just not funny.
130	13	"My Scrubs"	John Putch	Clarence Livingston	March 15, 2007	612	6.44
Unbeknownst to Dr. Kelso, J.D. and Turk try to beat the system to treat the Chief's uninsured friend. Elsewhere, the Janitor blackmails Carla with a case of mistaken dog identity. Meanwhile, Dr. Cox tries to convince Elliot that a reformed drug addict is not quite clean. All the while the entire staff is condemned to wearing dirt brown scrubs when Kelso suspects a clothing thief in their midst. The episode guest stars Alexander Chaplin as Sam Thompson and Victoria Tennant as Maggie Kent.
131	14	"My No Good Reason"	Zach Braff	Janae Bakken	March 22, 2007	613	6.44
J.D. and Turk try to forget that the Turks' new nanny is smoking hot, but when the pair holds a public screening of the footage from the nanny cam, Carla soon catches on. Elsewhere, Elliot and the Janitor team up to cheer up a dying patient, but their actions cause Dr. Kelso to feel undermined. Meanwhile, Nurse Laverne Roberts and Dr. Cox debate whether or not "everything happens for a reason", but when a tragedy falls upon one of the Sacred Heart staff it is hard to continue the argument.
132	15	"My Long Goodbye"^{†}	Victor Nelli, Jr.	Dave Tennant	April 5, 2007	615	4.89
Nurse Laverne Roberts is in a coma, and nobody knows when she will wake up. Elliot comes to visit and remembers the times when she was down, and Laverne cheered her up. Carla comes in and tells Elliot not to say goodbye because people have come back from worse. Jordan is giving birth and only gives Dr. Cox two hours' notice; he immediately starts freaking out. Carla refuses to accept that Laverne is going to die. A ghost of Laverne follows Carla around until Carla finally says goodbye to her.
133	16	"My Words of Wisdom"	Victor Nelli, Jr.	Eric Weinberg	April 12, 2007	616	5.05
J.D. treats a deaf patient and learns that the Janitor knows sign language. They are shocked when the father, also deaf, refuses a surgical implant that would allow his son to hear. After saying goodbye to Laverne, the Sacred Heart staff institutes some of her lessons into their lives. Though Carla thinks they have all forgotten, Dr. Cox takes time to reflect on his purpose, Elliot opens her heart to Keith, and J.D. and Turk learn compassion. The episode guest stars Troy Kotsur as Mr. Frances.
134	17	"Their Story"	Richard Alexander Wells	Andy Schwartz	April 19, 2007	617	5.61
In a unique twist, J.D. turns his narrating duties over to Ted, the Todd and Jordan — as this episode focuses on the lives of the supporting players at Sacred Heart Hospital. Ted juggles fantasies in which he has a full head of hair and a reality where he is helping the nursing staff fight for a raise; Todd meets his future son and helps Turk preserve his reputation and Jordan puts aside her knack for causing misery to help Elliot and Keith's relationship.
135	18	"My Turf War"	Bill Lawrence	Sean Russell	April 26, 2007	618	4.65
Elliot's wild sorority sister, Melody (Keri Russell) comes to town. Not able to deal with being the fifth wheel, J.D. turns the girls against each other in the hopes that he will once again be Elliot's priority friend and he might get to "mack" it with Melody. Meanwhile, Turk and Dr. Cox go head-to-head when they disagree over whether or not a patient requested surgery is necessary. Elsewhere, Carla discovers an unlikely ghost haunting pediatrics in an attempt to keep it clean.
136	19	"My Cold Shower"	John Inwood	Janae Bakken	May 3, 2007	619	4.95
When Elliot's engagement ring does not fit, Keith agrees to a "redo" in which Elliot plans her own engagement. Carla, Jordan and Elliot's sorority sister Melody gather to help plan the "surprise." Meanwhile, the men of Sacred Heart are suffering from too much talk and not enough action: J.D. keeps trying to take it past "macking" with Melody, but she keeps shooting him down, Turk and Carla have not been intimate since their daughter was born, and Dr. Kelso's internet is down — resulting in a lot of cold showers. With Elliot's engagement, her colleagues all fantasize about being married to her, each with their own personal twist.
137	20	"My Conventional Wisdom"^{†}	Michael McDonald	Bill Callahan	May 10, 2007	620	5.31
As Elliot begins to plan her wedding with Keith, J.D. continues to question his true feelings for her. In an attempt to ease his best friend's mind Turk takes him to a surgeon's convention in Phoenix, but the plan backfires when J.D. runs into his ex-girlfriend Kim and discovers that she had lied to him and is, in fact, still pregnant with their child. Meanwhile, Kelso and his cronies party it up at the convention while unknown to him, the Janitor takes on the role of chief of medicine back at Sacred Heart.
138	21	"My Rabbit"	John Putch	Kevin Biegel & Aseem Batra	May 17, 2007	621	5.28
J.D. learns that Kim's baby is a boy but is unsure of whether he could ever trust her enough to be with her. But then Turk and Cox teach J.D. a lesson about fatherhood. Meanwhile, Carla is supposed to plan Elliot's bachelorette party, but Elliot keeps taking over.
139	22	"My Point of No Return"	Linda Mendoza	Neil Goldman & Garrett Donovan	May 17, 2007	622	5.28
J.D. and Kim move in together as Elliot and Keith continue to plan their wedding, but as they each take big steps in their lives, J.D. and Elliot begin to panic and wonder if they really belong with their respective partners. Janitor and his new Brain Trust try to make Keith a better husband. Meanwhile, Dr. Cox continues to be angry that J.D. is his daughter's godfather.

=== Notes ===
- ^{†} denotes a "supersized" episode, running an extended length of 25–28 minutes.
