= Obadiah Parker =

American singer-songwriter

- Birth name: Mat Weddle
- Born: January 3, 1983 (age 42); Arizona, US
- Origin: Scottsdale, Arizona
- Genres: Folk/pop
- Years active: 2006–present
- Website: Official website

Mat Weddle (born January 3, 1983), better known by his stage and recording name Obadiah Parker, is a singer-songwriter from Scottsdale, Arizona. He has released an EP, a live CD which contains a mixture of covers and original material, an EP of covers, and a full-length studio album of original material. Weddle also appeared in a viral YouTube video playing an acoustic cover of Outkast's "Hey Ya!".

== History ==
Obadiah Parker began as a three-person band composed of Mat Weddle (vocals, guitar), Jessie Young (piano/keyboards, trumpet, vocals), and Daniel Zehring (bass, vocals). After meeting at a local church youth group, Weddle, Young, and Zehring began playing together in various local bands. Together, the band released "Salvation Jam" EP on October 2, 2006, and "Obadiah Parker Live" on April 2, 2007, via iTunes.

After the band's split, Weddle retained the name Obadiah Parker for his solo act. He has since released an acoustic EP of cover songs, "The Tip Jar, Vol. 1", as well as his first full-length, studio album, "The Siren and The Saint", recorded in Nashville, Tennessee with Grammy award-winning producer Mitch Dane.

== "Hey Ya" ==
In 2006, a video of Weddle performing a cover of Outkast's "Hey Ya" became a viral sensation. In a 2007 interview, Weddle estimated that over 1 million people had viewed the video, but, as of 2011, the video has been viewed over 8 million times. The performance was recorded at a local Open mic night, then obtained by a fan who mixed it with the original Outkast music video and uploaded it to YouTube. The cover version of "Hey Ya" earned nationwide media attention and radio play, including The Howard Stern Show and Jeopardy!. The recording reached the No. 1 spot on the iTunes Singer-Songwriter Charts in the UK, France, and multiple other countries. In 2009, Sam Lloyd of The Blanks (the actor who plays Ted Buckland) also covered the song on an episode of Scrubs entitled My Soul On Fire, Part 2.

== Discography ==
- 2006: Obadiah Parker EP
- 2007: Obadiah Parker Live
- 2008: The Tip Jar, Vol. I
- 2011: The Siren and the Saint
- 2014: The Tip Jar, Vol. II
