= Scrubs season 8 =

Scrubs
- Season 8
- DVD cover
- Showrunner: Bill Lawrence
- No. of episodes: 19

Release
- Original network: ABC
- Original release: January 6 – May 6, 2009

Season chronology
- ← Previous; Season 7 Next → Season 9

The eighth season of the American comedy television series Scrubs premiered on ABC on January 6, 2009 and concluded on May 6, 2009 and consists of 19 episodes. The eighth season was the first to be shown on ABC after NBC dropped the series, ending its seven-year run on the network. ABC's pick-up of the show was followed by it commissioning nineteen episodes, which included an hour-long finale. For all of the season's run, it was expected that the eighth season would be the last, especially after the show's creator Bill Lawrence announced it. After rumors surfaced of a ninth season, it was understood that the eighth would be the last to star Zach Braff and much of the main cast. However, the show was later re-commissioned for another season, in which Braff and other cast members appeared for multiple episodes. The eighth season was the first to air in high definition.

Needing to cut costs for the eighth season, Bill Lawrence stated that he divided the writing staff up into two groups, half for the first seven episodes and half for the last eleven episodes. Additionally, each main cast member was absent for three episodes during the season (except Zach Braff and Sarah Chalke who are absent for two). An accompanying web series that aired on ABC's website called Scrubs: Interns was also created to coincide with the season, starring the new interns with guest appearances by the main cast.

== Cast and characters ==
=== Main cast ===
Another way ABC cut costs is to have the main cast absent in a few episodes. Series star Zach Braff is absent for an episode for the first time in the series, and only lends his voice to another episode.

- Zach Braff as Dr. John "J.D." Dorian
- Sarah Chalke as Dr. Elliot Reid
- Donald Faison as Dr. Chris Turk
- Neil Flynn as The Janitor
- Ken Jenkins as Dr. Bob Kelso
- John C. McGinley as Dr. Perry Cox
- Judy Reyes as Nurse Carla Espinosa

=== Recurring roles ===
- Robert Maschio as Dr. Todd Quinlan
- Sam Lloyd as Ted Buckland
- Eliza Coupe as Dr. Denise Mahoney
- Christa Miller as Jordan Sullivan
- Betsy Beutler as Dr. Katie Collins
- Sonal Shah as Dr. Sonja "Sunny" Dey
- Todd Bosley as Dr. Howard "Howie" Gelder
- Kit Pongetti as Ladinia "Lady" Williams
- Taran Killam as Jimmy "The Overly Touchy Orderly"
- Aziz Ansari as Dr. Ed Dhandapani

=== Guest stars ===
- Courteney Cox as Dr. Taylor Maddox
- Kate Micucci as Stephanie Gooch
- Lee Thompson Young as Dr. Derek Hill
- Elizabeth Banks as Dr. Kim Briggs
- Johnny Kastl as Dr. Doug Murphy
- Travis Schuldt as Keith Dudemeister
- Aloma Wright as Nurse Laverne Roberts
- Scott Foley as Sean Kelly
- Jay Kenneth Johnson as Dr. Matthews
- The Blanks as the Worthless Peons

== Production ==
After a rumor-induced build-up to season eight, and it being believed that season seven was the last, ABC picked up Scrubs and announced it as a midseason replacement. The first episode aired January 6, 2009.

The season's timeslot shifted from Scrubs being shown on Tuesdays at 9:00 pm and 9:30 pm to Wednesdays at 8:00 pm beginning with episode 11, "My Nah Nah Nah." The show performed most successfully on Wednesdays, with average viewing figures of 5.36 million an episode.

To cut costs the writing staff was split into two groups, with the exception of Bill Lawrence, Neil Goldman and Garrett Donovan, and Bill Callahan: one group for the first seven episodes, and the second for the rest of the season. Since Goldman & Donovan, Callahan and Lawrence wrote an episode in the second half, the term was longer. Mike Schwartz and Mark Stegemann, two writers who had been on since season one, did not return to the writing staff, although Stegemann did return to direct one episode. For the episode "My Nah Nah Nah," writers who did not work in season 8 were credited, since the episode was partially written/filmed during production of season 7.

=== Writing staff ===
- Bill Lawrence – executive producer/head writer
- Neil Goldman and Garrett Donovan – executive producers/assistant head writers
- Bill Callahan – executive producer/assistant head writer

Episodes 1–7

- Janae Bakken – co-executive producer
- Angela Nissel – co-executive producer
- Aseem Batra – co-producer
- Clarence Livingston – co-producer
- Dave Tennant – executive story editor
- Taii K. Austin – staff writer

Episodes 8–19

- Debra Fordham – co-executive producer
- Tad Quill – consulting producer
- Kevin Biegel – co-producer
- Andy Schwartz – executive story editor
- Devin Mahoney & Rego Marquiis – staff writers

=== Production staff ===
- Bill Lawrence – executive producer/showrunner
- Randall Winston – producer
- Liz Newman – producer
- Danny Rose – co-producer
- Abraham Park – associate producer

=== Directors ===
Includes directors who directed 2 or more episodes, or directors who are part of the cast and crew

- Bill Lawrence (6 episodes)
- Michael Spiller (2 episodes)
- John Putch (2 episodes)
- Zach Braff (1 episode)
- Michael McDonald (1 episode)
- John Michel (editor) (1 episode)
- Mark Stegemann (writer) (1 episode)

=== Scrubs: Interns ===
To coincide with Scrubs being shown on television, a web series was produced called Scrubs: Interns. It consisted of twelve webisodes following the adventures of the interns at Sacred Heart Hospital. The episodes featured cameos from several regular cast members, and included an episode with J.D. The webisodes' theme tune was performed by The Blanks.

== Episodes ==
Scrubs season 8 episodes
No. overall	No. in season	Title	Directed by	Written by	Original release date	Prod. code	U.S. viewers (millions)
151	1	"My Jerks"	Michael Spiller	Angela Nissel	January 6, 2009	801	6.74
Dr. Taylor Maddox (Courteney Cox) joins Sacred Heart as new chief of medicine and Dr. Cox tries to avoid her. J.D. struggles to manage new interns. Carla helps Elliot put her ego in check and Elliot apologizes to Keith for their break-up. The Janitor is caught tormenting J.D. by Maddox and is fired.
152	2	"My Last Words"	Bill Lawrence	Aseem Batra	January 6, 2009	802	6.61
J.D. and Turk set aside their personal plans to comfort George Valentine (Glynn Turman), a terminally ill patient with ischemic bowel disease who will probably die in the night. J.D. and Turk decide to stay and talk George through his fears of death.
153	3	"My Saving Grace"	Michael Spiller	Janae Bakken	January 13, 2009	803	4.61
Dr. Cox requests Dr. Kelso's help to oust Dr. Maddox from Sacred Heart. Carla decides to take self-centred, incompetent intern Katie (Betsy Beutler) down a notch by teaching her a lesson.
154	4	"My Happy Place"	Ken Whittingham	Taii K. Austin	January 13, 2009	804	4.33
J.D. and Elliot reflect on their past break-ups when they try to encourage Dr. Kelso to branch out beyond the coffee shop and decide to give their relationship another try. Dr. Cox, Todd and Turk work together to help two kidney transplant patients. The Janitor is re-hired as he tricks payroll into thinking he was not fired and that they forgot his paycheck. A flashback shows him firing his replacement.
155	5	"My ABC's"	Bill Lawrence	Bill Lawrence	January 27, 2009	713	5.07
J.D., Elliot and Dr. Cox each choose an intern to work with. J.D. picks Denise (Eliza Coupe), who lacks compassion towards patients. Elliot's intern, Katie, tries to use her to land a case study with Turk, who picks Ed over Katie due to his multicolored pen. Dr. Cox chooses Ed (Aziz Ansari), who is lazy and overconfident. Sesame Street cameos from Oscar the Grouch, Grover and Elmo.
156	6	"My Cookie Pants"	Gail Mancuso	Clarence Livingston	January 27, 2009	805	4.99
Elliot seeks Turk's advice on reigniting romance with J.D., who in turn tries to teach Denise to use compassion while dealing with patients. Dr. Kelso recommends Dr. Cox for the job Chief of Medicine, who is conflicted over taking the role.
157	7	"My New Role"	Will Mackenzie	Dave Tennant	February 3, 2009	806	4.82
Dr. Cox is overcome by his new role as Chief of Medicine and approaches Dr. Kelso for help.
158	8	"My Lawyer's in Love"	Mark Stegemann	Debra Fordham	February 3, 2009	811	4.68
Ted finds it hard to take an initiative when he falls in love at first sight. Meanwhile, Dr. Cox finds it difficult to handle multiple situations.
159	9	"My Absence"	John Putch	Debra Fordham & Andy Schwartz	February 10, 2009	812	4.56
Elliot is faced with J.D.'s absence at the hospital. Meanwhile, Carla tells Turk that she is pregnant again. Turk takes this seriously as the whole hospital does not really care due to this not being their first-born child. This is the first episode in the entire series in which J.D. does not appear.
160	10	"My Comedy Show"	Ted Wass	Devin O. Mahoney & C. Rego Marquiis	February 10, 2009	807	4.22
All of the new interns get assigned to do a role of each doctor by Turk and J.D. The sketch show ends with a sketch of Turk and J.D. portrayed as a couple in love, indicating that the whole hospital thinks of them that way. Both Turk and J.D. begin to think they should stop their behavior in the hospital, but both find it too hard to resist. Meanwhile, Elliot tries to get Denise to get out of the hospital to have fun with the other interns. Meanwhile, Carla makes the Janitor believe that he is losing his mind.
161	11	"My Nah Nah Nah"	John Putch	Kevin Biegel	March 18, 2009	712	5.62
Turk gets an idea about a risky procedure from watching SportsCenter that may restore a paralyzed teenager's ability to walk. Jordan gets mad at Dr. Cox when he wears their wedding ring. Lady refuses to hold Janitor's hand, which upsets and confuses him.
162	12	"Their Story II"	Michael McDonald	Andy Schwartz	March 25, 2009	808	5.27
Narrated from the perspective of the hospital's new interns. J.D. assumes the role arguing with Dr. Cox over hospital's various needs. However, his successes do not go over well with Turk.
163	13	"My Full Moon"	John Michel	Kevin Biegel	April 1, 2009	813	4.97
A full moon and some bad luck bring Sacred Heart's new interns their roughest cases yet. Meanwhile, Elliot ponders her future as a doctor after she finds out the source of a patient's mysterious illness, and then has to tell that patient.
164	14	"My Soul on Fire"	Bill Lawrence	Bill Callahan	April 8, 2009	809	4.56
165	15	"My Soul on Fire"	Bill Lawrence	Bill Callahan	April 15, 2009	810	5.06
The Janitor and Lady send out invitations to their fake wedding in the Bahamas in order to score some free gifts, but the joke is on them when J.D. convinces everyone from the hospital to go. Janitor and Lady's quirky, tropical, seaside wedding ceremony affirms the romance for the oddest of the hospital's couples. Meanwhile, there is trouble in paradise for the other couples. The episode features a cameo appearance from Scrubs' creator Bill Lawrence as Van, Justice of the Peace.
166	16	"My Cuz"	Linda Mendoza	Kevin Biegel	April 22, 2009	814	4.60
As J.D. plans to move closer to Sam, he reaches out to make peace with Kim (Elizabeth Banks) and finds that she has a new man in her life, Elliot's ex-boyfriend Sean (Scott Foley). Meanwhile, Turk rallies the troops at Sacred Heart to help him campaign for a promotion to chief of surgery while Dr. Kelso is admitted to the hospital after eating a tainted muffin and treats himself, much to the irritation of the hospital staff.
167	17	"My Chief Concern"	Zach Braff	Neil Goldman & Garrett Donovan	May 5, 2009	815	3.71
Change begets change when J.D. considers taking a new job so he can live closer to his son and Kim, Turk begins his new role as chief of surgery, and Ted and Gooch take their relationship to the next level.
168	18	"My Finale"	Bill Lawrence	Bill Lawrence	May 6, 2009	816/817	5.07
169	19	"My Finale"	Bill Lawrence	Bill Lawrence	May 6, 2009	816/817	5.07
J.D. intends to leave Sacred Heart to move closer to his son, while he and Elliot plan to take their relationship to the next level. He then goes around saying his farewells to everyone and gets upset when Dr. Cox will not say goodbye to him. Final Scrubs appearance of:Travis Schuldt as Keith Dudemeister and Aloma Wright as Laverne Roberts
