= The Blanks =

American singing quartet

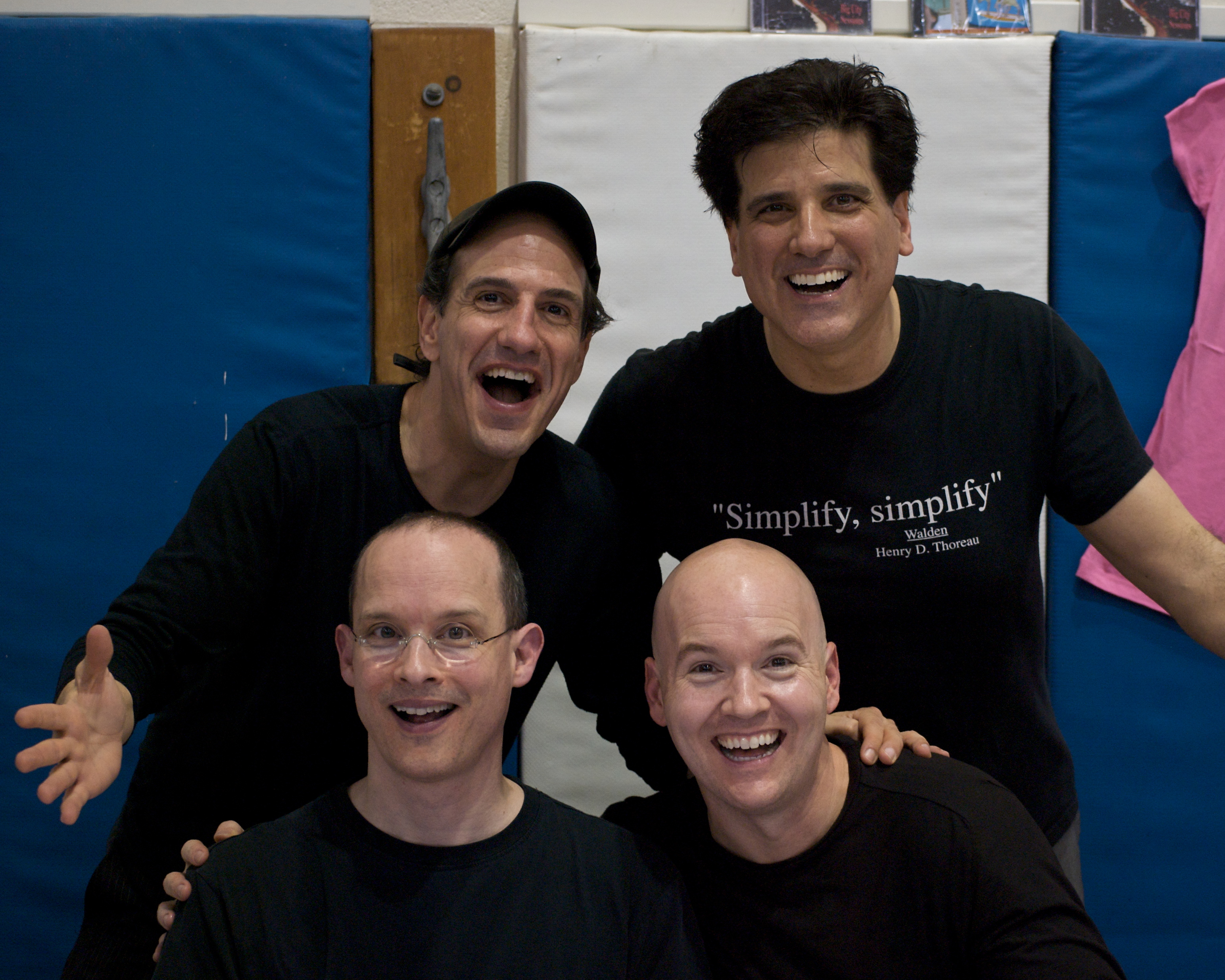
- Clockwise from top left: Sam Lloyd, George Miserlis, Philip McNiven, Paul F. Perry

Background information
- Genres: A cappella
- Label: Parody Records
- Members: Philip McNiven – tenor; George Miserlis – baritone; Paul F. Perry – bass
- Past members: Sam Lloyd – baritone (deceased)

The Blanks are an American a cappella group. They were recurring guests on the TV series Scrubs under various names such as Ted's Band and The Worthless Peons. They have released two albums: Riding the Wave and Worth The Weight.

== Members ==
- Sam Lloyd – baritone (deceased)
- Philip McNiven – tenor
- George Miserlis – baritone
- Paul F. Perry – bass

== History ==
Sam Lloyd and George Miserlis met Paul Perry while studying at Syracuse University. Some time later they met Philip McNiven while living in Los Angeles and formed the group. Sam Lloyd died in April 2020.

== Performances on Scrubs ==
Actor Sam Lloyd had a recurring role on Scrubs as the hospital's lawyer, Ted Buckland. The band impressed the show's producer, Bill Lawrence, with a performance of Scrubs' theme song at a Christmas party midway into the first season, and Lawrence decided to write them into the show.,

They appeared as the singing group in the following episodes:

- Episode 1.23, "My Hero": cartoon theme songs: "Speed Racer" and "Underdog"
- Episode 2.02, "My Nightingale": prime time theme songs: "The Facts of Life", "The Six Million Dollar Man", and "Charles in Charge"
- Episode 2.14, "My Brother, My Keeper": "Hello! Ma Baby"
- Episode 2.19, "My Kingdom": commercial jingles for Folgers Coffee, Mennen, and McDonald's
- Episode 3.22, "My Best Friend's Wedding": "Hava Nagila", "Bridal Chorus" and "Eight Days a Week"
- Episode 4.13, "My Ocardial Infarction": "No, Not Much" sung in an a cappella battle with the Janitor's fake band, "Hibbleton" (who sang "Barbara Ann")
- Episode 5.07, "My Way Home": songs from classic movies: "Maniac" from Flashdance, "We're Off to See the Wizard" and "Over the Rainbow" from The Wizard of Oz; the arrangement they performed of the latter song was made famous by Israel Kamakawiwoʻole
- Episode 5.21, "My Fallen Idol": "Put on a Happy Face"
- Episode 5.24, "My Transition": "Baby Back Ribs", (the Chili's jingle) sung as a method of torture by repeating "Baby Back" over and over without ever saying "ribs"
- Episode 6.04, "My House": the chorus of "Lollipop" when Elliot is trying to tempt Kelso into speaking to her
- Episode 6.06, "My Musical": they appear with what appears to be most of the hospital, to sing to Carla.
- Episode 6.16, "My Words of Wisdom": they appear at Nurse Laverne Roberts' funeral, but do not sing. Ted just compares his band to the choir singing.
- Episode 7.04, "My Identity Crisis": they sing The Who's "Who Are You" in preparation for an a cappella competition
- Episode 8.08, "My Lawyer's In Love": they sing Blue Öyster Cult's "(Don't Fear) The Reaper" in preparation of impressing Dr. Cox to let the group sing at the Pediatric ward, and later sing Kansas' "Carry On Wayward Son" in a jam with character Stephanie Gooch, played by Kate Micucci.
- Episode 8.15, "My Soul On Fire, Part 2": Ted sings Outkast's "Hey Ya!" (as performed by Mat Weddle) as the Janitor and Lady finish their wedding vows.
- Episode 8.18, "My Finale": The band is heard performing the show's theme song, "Superman", during the credits.

The Blanks also provide the theme song for the web-only series Scrubs: Interns.
