= Scrubs (2026 TV series) =

American medical sitcom

- Genre: Medical sitcom
- Created by: Bill Lawrence
- Developed by: Aseem Batra; Tim Hobert
- Showrunner: Aseem Batra
- Starring: Zach Braff; Sarah Chalke; Donald Faison; Ava Bunn
- Narrated by: Zach Braff
- Theme music composer: Chad Fischer; Chris Link; Tim Bright
- Opening theme: "Superman" by Lazlo Bane
- Country of origin: United States
- Original language: English
- No. of seasons: 2
- No. of episodes: 17 (list of episodes)

Production
- Executive producers: Bill Lawrence; Aseem Batra; Zach Braff; Sarah Chalke; Donald Faison; Jeff Ingold; Liza Katzer; Michael Spiller; Randall Keenan Winston; Tim Hobert
- Camera setup: Single-camera
- Running time: 22–24 minutes
- Production companies: Doozer; Seemu! Inc.; 20th Television

Original release
- Network: ABC
- Release: February 25, 2026 – present

Related
- Scrubs (2001–2010)

Scrubs (stylized as [scrubs]) is an American medical sitcom created by Bill Lawrence for ABC as a continuation of the 2001–2010 television series of the same name, and is developed by Aseem Batra and Tim Hobert. The series was officially announced by ABC in July 2025, following J.D. as he returns to Sacred Heart as its new Chief of Medicine years after the eighth season finale; the revival ignores the events of the ninth season of the original series, in which Sacred Heart Hospital was demolished. Zach Braff, Sarah Chalke and Donald Faison all star and return in their original series roles, alongside recurring returns and appearances by John C. McGinley and Judy Reyes.

The Scrubs revival premiered with its nine-episode first season on February 25, 2026. The ten-episode second season, which was announced that April, premiered on September 30, 2026.

== Cast ==
=== Main ===
- Zach Braff as Dr. John "J.D." Dorian, the new Chief of Medicine at Sacred Heart Hospital; Elliot's former husband and father to their child Ollie, as well as Sam, a son from J.D.'s past relationship with Dr. Kim Briggs; and Turk's best friend.
- Sarah Chalke as Dr. Elliot Reid, internal medicine doctor at Sacred Heart, J.D.'s former wife and mother to their child Ollie and a close friend of Carla.
- Donald Faison as Dr. Chris Turk, Sacred Heart's Chief of Surgery; Carla's husband and father of their four daughters Isabella ("Izzy"), Ellie, Sofia, and Nora; and J.D.'s best friend.
- Ava Bunn as Dr. Samantha "Sam" Tosh (season 2; recurring season 1), a medical intern under J.D. who also works as an influencer to pay off school loans. She often uses social media to solve work-related problems.

=== Recurring ===
- John C. McGinley as Dr. Perry Cox, Sacred Heart's previous Chief of Medicine, who appoints J.D. as his successor, and Jordan's former husband, as well as father to their son Jack and daughter Jennifer Dylan.
- Judy Reyes as Nurse Carla Espinosa, head nurse at Sacred Heart, Turk's wife and Elliot's close friend.
- Robert Maschio as Dr. "The" Todd Quinlan, Turk's womanizing, ambiguously bisexual friend and fellow surgeon.
- Vanessa Bayer as Sibby Wilson, the new head of HR and wellness specialist at Sacred Heart.
- Joel Kim Booster as Dr. Kevin Park (season 1), a conniving attending physician who envies J.D.'s new role.
- Jacob Dudman as Dr. Asher Green, an optimistic but weak-willed British medical intern under J.D.
- David Gridley as Dr. Blake Lewis, a stoic, loner medical intern under J.D.
- Layla Mohammadi as Dr. Amara Hadi, a surgical intern under Turk in whom Asher becomes romantically interested.
- Amanda Morrow as Dr. Dashana Trainor, a surgical intern under Turk, and in whom Turk sees a younger version of himself.
- Michael James Scott as Nurse Francois Dubois, a sassy charge nurse who enjoys gossip.
- X Mayo as Nurse Pippa Raymond (season 1), a charge nurse and Francois's equally sassy best friend who also enjoys gossip.
- Rachel Bilson as Charlie, J.D.'s first girlfriend following his divorce from Elliot. (season 2; guest season 1)
- John Higgins as Grant Summers, the hospital's new Chief Resident whom J.D. wants to mentor (season 2)

=== Guest ===
- Christa Miller as Jordan Sullivan, Dr. Cox's former wife who used to serve on Sacred Heart's board of directors.
- Neil Flynn as The Chief Custodian of the Joint Commission / Glen Matthews / "Janitor", a former janitor, now Chief Custodian of the Joint Commission.
- Phill Lewis as Dr. Hooch, an unstable orthopedic surgeon.
- Lisa Gilroy as Lily (season 1), a volunteer harp player at the hospital.
- Andy Ridings as Wes, a pilot who starts dating Elliot.
- Darcy Michael as the "Maintenance Guy", new custodian at Sacred Heart.
- Matt Rife as Logan Nichols (season 1), a patient of Tosh and Elliot's.
- Keyla Monterroso Mejia as Mimi (season 2), a nurse in training who assists Turk and Carla.
- Scott Foley as Sean Kelly (season 2), Elliot's ex-boyfriend, who she resumes dating.
- Tamera Mowry as Dr. Steffie (season 2), the head of pediatrics.
- Stephanie Koenig as Cassie Simmons (season 2), the new hospital administrator.
- Punkie Johnson as Dee (season 2), a prison inmate and Elliot's patient.

== Episodes ==
Scrubs (TV series) series overview
Series	Season	Episodes	Originally released			Average viewers (millions)	Rank
Series	Season	Episodes	First released	Last released	Network	Average viewers (millions)	Rank
Revival series	1	9	February 25, 2026	April 15, 2026	ABC	8.70 (Note: Multi-platform viewership including ABC, Disney+ and Hulu.)	22
Revival series	2	10	September 30, 2026	December 9, 2026	ABC	TBA	TBA

=== Season 1 (2026) ===
No. overall	No. in season	Title	Directed by	Written by	Original release date	Prod. code	U.S. viewers (millions)
1	1	"My Return"	Zach Braff	Aseem Batra & Tim Hobert	February 25, 2026	1AUP01	4.41
Sixteen years after the events of "My Finale", John Dorian, now divorced from Elliot Reid, is working as a concierge doctor visiting elderly patients. He decides to visit his old workplace, Sacred Heart Hospital, to check on one of his patients, and while there meets former colleagues and a new generation of interns. Towards the end of his visit, J.D. accepts a new job at the hospital upon seeing another patient in critical condition after being rejected from admission by loner intern Blake Lewis. He informs Dr. Cox that he has decided to stay, and Dr. Cox appoints him Chief of Medicine in place of himself.
2	2	"My 2nd First Day"	Michael Spiller	Amy Pocha & Seth Cohen	February 25, 2026	1AUP02	3.52
As J.D. begins to take on the responsibilities of running Sacred Heart's medical staff, he tries to discover his own teaching style while learning to navigate the quirks of his newly-assigned interns and to avoid coming into conflict with the peppy but overly intrusive new HR manager, Sibby Wilson. He must also make a difficult decision related to the hospital's budget that leaves him torn between Turk's and Elliot's interests.
3	3	"My Rom-Com"	Chris Koch	Mathew Harawitz	March 4, 2026	1AUP03	3.35
Elliot's struggle to convince a patient to keep living is complicated by her trying to navigate having J.D. as her new boss. When Turk and Dashana learn that Amara was homeschooled, Dashana steps up to help give her more confidence. Blake helps Asher navigate his burgeoning crush on Amara while J.D. rediscovers RateYourDoc.org and learns someone has left him a negative review.
4	4	"My Poker Face"	Randall Keenan Winston	Michael Hobert	March 11, 2026	1AUP04	3.14
Turk, constantly surrounded by female energy, convinces J.D. to turn his new apartment into a "bro-jo" and host a poker night. They also try to broker a peace between the medical and surgical interns but, when Turk has to bail on poker night, it causes a rift between both them and the interns. When a patient is hospitalized for following a fad diet on TikTok, Elliot and Tosh clash over the use of social media in medicine, but J.D. convinces Elliot to consider new points of view.
5	5	"My Angel"	Ken Whittingham	Aaron Lee	March 18, 2026	1AUP05	3.07
J.D. struggles to navigate post-divorce dating and begins flirting with a harp player named Lily, but she turns out to be more than J.D. bargained for. Elliot, also struggling with singledom, focuses on trying to secure a new organ for a transplant patient. Blake and Amara accidentally insult the charge nurses and Dr. Park begins teaching the interns the unwritten rules of the hospital.
6	6	"My V.I.P."	Gail Mancuso	Mark Stegemann	March 25, 2026	1AUP06	3.08
J.D. and Dr. Park are forced to work together when they suspect that a board member's wife may be harming him. Deshana and Amara are forced to face their insecurities when their surgery patient flees under their watch. Elliot is worried her new boyfriend, Wes, may be hiding something and Turk volunteers to look into him. When Blake's patients are too attracted to him to confess their issues, Sam tries to help him be vulnerable with them to get them to open up.
7	7	"My Best Friend's Barbecue"	Randall Keenan Winston	Sophie Zucker	April 1, 2026	1AUP07	3.04
J.D. is upset at not being invited to Turk's annual barbecue and decides to use Carla's menopause as an excuse to get closer to her, forcing her to finally confront her age when J.D. goes overboard. Turk tries to teach Dashana to be more emotionally open with her patients and their families. Elliot uses a psychosis patient who believes she is Mariah Carey to teach Blake to be more caring. Amara freaks out when she feels Asher is moving too fast with their relationship. Elliot confronts Carla about whether or not she likes Wes.
8	8	"My Odds"	Chris Koch	Aseem Batra	April 8, 2026	1AUP08	2.94
J.D., finally feeling confident as Chief of Medicine, is determined to impress a visiting Dr. Cox and urges the interns to bring their best. The interns are able to successfully treat a trio of patients, albeit not without difficulties. Things take a further turn when Dr. Cox collapses and refuses to let J.D. treat him. When the test results come in and reveal that Dr. Cox has an autoimmune disease, he and J.D. are forced to face a monumental shift in their relationship.
9	9	"My Celebration"	Randall Keenan Winston	Christopher Eddins & Brianna Porter	April 15, 2026	1AUP09	2.94
Jordan has been hovering around Perry since his diagnosis and Perry forces J.D. to cover for him when the test results are less than ideal. The interns are feeling down and Elliot tries to motivate them by helping a father make it to his daughter's wedding but things get complicated. Turk and Carla think they've found the perfect woman for J.D. but fumble trying to pick her up for him. J.D. is unnerved when his longtime nemesis, the Janitor, returns to Sacred Heart and resumes his torment of J.D.

=== Season 2 (2026) ===
No. overall	No. in season	Title	Directed by	Written by	Original release date	Prod. code	U.S. viewers (millions)
10	1	"My First Time in a While"	Zach Braff	Mathew Harawitz	September 30, 2026	2AUP01	2.68
J.D., Turk and Elliot are stumped as to why Dr. Cox isn't responding to treatment. Jordan gives them 24 hours to figure it out or she'll move him to a different hospital. Tosh is second guessing herself over how to treat a patient. Sibby is on the hunt to find the new couple in the hospital.
11	2	"My Mentee"	Michael Spiller	Mark Stegemann	September 30, 2026	2AUP02	2.01
J.D. takes on a new protege, head resident Grant, while also trying to figure out a workaround for Dr. Cox's insurance. Turk must face the limitations of his age when Dashana outdoes him at a simple surgical challenge. Elliot urges Tosh to think about her specialty but tries to intervene when the head of pediatrics Dr. Steffie pursues Tosh.
12	3	"My Ex's Ex"	Gail Mancuso	Michael Hobert	October 7, 2026	2AUP03	2.49
13	4	"My Chief"	Randall Keenan Winston	Mike Royce	October 14, 2026	2AUP04	2.75
14	5	"My Best Friend's Birthday"	Pete Chatmon	Max Searle	October 21, 2026	2AUP05	2.83
15	6	"My Halloween"	Craig Zisk	Alan Yanaga	October 28, 2026	2AUP06	2.54
16	7	"My Story"	Michael Spiller	Aseem Batra & Mariam Girgis	November 4, 2026	2AUP07	2.70
17	8	"My Emergency"	Adam Bernstein	Christopher Eddins & Brianna Porter	November 11, 2026	2AUP08	2.78
JD struggles with his renewed feelings for Eliot and their family life by focusing on his new relationship with Cassie, the new Hospital Administrator, who is inccreasing the workload of the hospital. At the same the interns struggle with their lack of personal time and starting new romantic relationships. Asher discovers Sam has been plotting to give him easy cases because she didn't trust him, and Eliot helps him realize his potential, which gives him the confidence to confess his love for Sam
18	9	"My Worthless Peon"	TBA	TBA	December 2, 2026	TBA	TBD
19	10	"My Wonderful Life"	TBA	TBA	December 9, 2026	TBA	TBD

== Production ==
=== Development ===
Promotional poster for the revival season

As early as 2022, series creator Bill Lawrence planned on doing a revival of Scrubs. In December 2024, it was reported that a Scrubs revival was in development at ABC from Lawrence. In July 2025, the revival received a series order and it was set to debut during the 2025–26 television season on ABC. Executive producers include Lawrence, Braff, Faison, Chalke, Jeff Ingold, Liza Katzer, Tim Hobert and Aseem Batra, with Hobert and Batra serving as showrunners. In October 2025, it was reported that Hobert left the production due to creative differences. He is still credited as executive producer.

In April 2026, after the first season had completed airing, ABC renewed it for a second season. For the second season, Mike Royce joined as an executive producer, and writer Mathew Harawitz and director Michael Spiller were promoted to executive producers.

=== Casting ===
Along with the revival announcement, it was confirmed Braff, Faison and Chalke would reprise their roles. In September 2025, Reyes and McGinley were confirmed to return in recurring roles. In October 2025, it was confirmed Robert Maschio and Phill Lewis would return in their original series roles, and that new cast members would include Vanessa Bayer, Joel Kim Booster, Ava Bunn, Jacob Dudman, David Gridley, Layla Mohammadi and Amanda Morrow. In February 2026, it was announced that Neil Flynn and Christa Miller would reprise their roles, while Rachel Bilson, Andy Ridings and Lisa Gilroy were announced as guest stars.

Shortly after filming began on the second season in July 2026, the returning cast members were confirmed; Braff, Chalke, and Faison as series regulars, and Bunn promoted to series regular. Numerous recurring roles were also confirmed, including original cast members McGinley, Reyes, Flynn, Miller, and Maschio.

=== Filming ===
Production began in October 2025 in Vancouver and concluded in December 2025. Filming took place on sets recreating the original North Hollywood Medical Center, the decommissioned hospital that served as the filming location and production offices of the first eight seasons. The exterior of the ground floor emergency entrance of the fictional Sacred Heart Hospital was replicated, with visual effects used to show the exterior of the upper floors, while interiors were built identical to the blueprints of the original hospital building-turned-set, on a soundstage, with the revival ignoring the events of Scrubs: Med School, in which the original hospital was demolished.

Production began on the second season in July 2026 and it will consist of 10 episodes.

=== Title sequence ===
The season uses an updated version of the original title sequence, complete with the original Lazlo Bane version of the theme. Dr. Cox, Dr. Kelso, and Carla do not appear in this version of the intro, with new interns being seen instead. The X-ray has been replaced with a digital one, with J.D. swiping it onto a TV screen from a tablet. The X-ray is once again not backwards.

== Release ==
The season premiered on February 25, 2026, on ABC with back-to-back episodes. Episodes are available to stream the following day on Hulu. The revival's first season consists of 9 episodes. The second season premiered on September 30, 2026, with back-to-back episodes.

== Reception ==
The first season received positive reviews from critics. On Rotten Tomatoes, the season has an approval rating of 90% based on 50 reviews with an average score of 7.4/10. The website's critics consensus reads, "Scrubs revives and revamps its signature laughs and cast to deliver another fan-favorite run of medical gags, heartfelt dramedy, and instant fun." On Metacritic, it has a score of 73 out of 100 based on 27 reviews, signifying "generally favorable" reviews.

The second season received positive reviews. On Rotten Tomatoes, it has an approval rating of 100% based on 8 reviews with an average score of 8/10.
