= Keith Dudemeister =

Fictional character

- First appearance: "My Intern's Eyes" (2006)
- Last appearance: "My Finale" (2009)
- Created by: Bill Lawrence
- Portrayed by: Travis Schuldt

In-universe information
- Gender: Male
- Title: Medical Resident
- Occupation: Doctor of Internal Medicine
- Significant other: Elliot Reid (ex-fiancé)

Keith Dudemeister is a fictional recurring character in TV series Scrubs. He is played by Travis Schuldt.

Introduced in the fifth season episode "My Intern's Eyes"; the episode was shown through (but not narrated from) Keith's point of view.

== Character biography ==
Keith was introduced as a timid intern who became very popular amongst his fellow interns and some senior staff.

J.D. took Keith under his wing and taught him the ropes. Despite all this, J.D. grew to irrationally dislike Keith, who quickly began to excel in his hospital duties, and furthermore because Keith was a "booty call" that progressed into a relationship with Elliot. However, J.D. soon decided that he would like Keith because Elliot did, and admitted that Keith had genuine skills as a doctor, with the two becoming good friends soon after. J.D. also admitted in one episode that, had Elliot never worked at the hospital, he and Keith would probably have immediately become best friends. Despite J.D.'s dislike of Keith, the two have a great deal in common—which may explain Elliot's interest in him. Elliot, who spoke fluent German, informed J.D. that Keith's last name meant "master of dudes" in German. Keith and Ted would eventually become best friends. In "His Story IV", Keith revealed himself to be a Republican, which strengthened his relationship with Elliot, as she was also one. Eventually, Keith moved in with Elliot and she confessed that she loved him. Keith later proposed to her, and they quickly began to plan a wedding. Elliot, doubting her love for Keith, had second thoughts and cold feet, responding by nearly cheating on Keith with J.D. She decided to break off the engagement. Their relationship became very strained, with Keith insulting Elliot whenever he saw her. While he eventually acted professionally at work with her, he alternated between anger and depression outside of the workplace. Elliot made jokes about her leaving him, but Ted informed her that Keith was still hurt and pretended to be over it only when she was around. Elliot finally realized his feelings in "My Jerks" and sincerely apologized for hurting him. Keith responded by saying he had really needed to hear that. He appeared again in "My Finale" in J.D.'s final daydream of all the people he had met at Sacred Heart.

== Reception ==
In Seth Amitin of IGN's review of season 8 of the series, he said: "Keith and Elliot should have gotten married. That would have been the proper ending. The decision to split them apart, probably from on high (I can't imagine Bill Lawrence tearing apart his whole show to rebuild a killed topic), was forced, awkward and invalidated quite a bit of the previous three seasons."

In 2025, Screen Rant said that Keith deserved a return in the revival season. Calling his character "underrated". Later in 2025, Screen Rant ranked him #5 on the list of characters they wanted to see in the revival alongside J.D.
