= Perry Cox =

Perry Cox, M.D.
- Scrubs character
- First appearance: "My First Day" (2001)
- Created by: Bill Lawrence
- Portrayed by: John C. McGinley

In-universe information
- Gender: Male
- Title(s): Attending Physician of Internal Medicine; Residency Director; Interim Chief of Medicine; Chief of Medicine
- Occupation: Doctor of internal medicine
- Family: Paige (sister)
- Spouses: Jordan Sullivan (ex-wife/current partner)
- Children: Jack Cox; Jennifer Dylan "J.D." Cox
- Nationality: American
- Birthday: July 2, 1960
- Alma mater: Rutgers University

Percival Ulysses "Perry" Cox, M.D., is a fictional character played by John C. McGinley on the 2001–2010 comedy-drama television series Scrubs and its 2026 reboot series.

McGinley, Zach Braff, and Donald Faison were the only cast members who returned as regulars for Season 9.

He returns in the reboot series in a recurring role.

== Character profile ==
Cox is a sarcastic, cynical misanthrope who has a quick wit normally expressed through frequent and sometimes very long rants. These rants were often handed to McGinley the night before, or on the day of recording. At the beginning of the series, he is an attending physician at Sacred Heart Hospital; he is later promoted to residency director and, by the eighth season, to chief of medicine. In the ninth season, he becomes a professor when Sacred Heart is turned into a medical school, although the canon status of this is dubious. In the season 10 revival he hands the management of Sacred Heart to J.D. after finding himself unable to keep up with the rapid changes to medicine. He is the superior of and unwilling mentor to the series' protagonist, John "J.D." Dorian (Zach Braff). He has a "married but not married" relationship with his equally acerbic ex-wife, Jordan Sullivan (Christa Miller), with whom he has a son, Jack, and a daughter, Jennifer Dylan. He treats virtually everyone in the hospital with derision, especially his longtime nemesis, chief of medicine Bob Kelso (Ken Jenkins).

Cox is athletic, often playing basketball in the hospital's parking lot with younger employees. In "My Friend the Doctor", he slam dunks a basketball to show off, but injures his back when he lands. Out of vanity, he tries to hide the injury. He is extremely narcissistic and egocentric; when named by a magazine as the best doctor in the city, he lines up every staff member beneath him, as well as his ex-wife, to praise him or risk a physical reprisal from the Janitor (Neil Flynn).

While he goes out of his way to distance himself from others, Cox often gets mixed up in the lives of both his patients and those around him. This personal involvement often manifests in destructive ways, with Cox externalizing his feelings to those around him. Despite this, he has intervened in some situations to help others with no expectation of personal gain and often to his own detriment, like when he punches Kelso in the face in front of the entire staff when Kelso berates Elliot Reid (Sarah Chalke).

According to McGinley in the Season 1 DVD bonus features, Cox's habit of touching his nose is a homage to Robert Redford's character in The Sting, although Cox also uses it as a sign of irritation on occasion, rather than just signifying "it's going to be OK", as in the film. Dr. Cox has also been compared to Gregory House. This is further explored in "My House", during which Cox acquires a temporary limp. At the end of the episode, Cox walks into the room where the other characters are and gives them the answers to everything they have been trying to figure out throughout the episode, in a way reminiscent of House.

Cox becomes chief of medicine after Kelso retires, but it does not come easily. He temporarily holds the position until the board finds a replacement, Dr. Taylor Maddox (Courteney Cox). After concluding that Maddox is worse than Kelso, Cox teams up with the Janitor and Kelso to oust her. After Maddox is fired, the position is vacant until Kelso, unbeknownst to Cox, recommends him for the job. Cox is initially hesitant to take the job out of fear of losing the connection he has with his patients. After a few days, Kelso convinces him to accept the position.

In the Season 2 DVD commentary of "His Story", series creator Bill Lawrence stated that Cox always knows if someone is standing behind him, as well as who it is, without turning around to check. This quirk is subverted in "My Finale" when J.D. stands behind Cox as he tells one of the new interns how he really feels; throughout the speech, he gives no sign that he knows that J.D. is behind him.

He is also shown to be skilled at golf, regularly besting Kelso.

Cox harbors an intense hatred for Hugh Jackman, mentioning him frequently in his rants throughout the series. According to a 2006 interview with McGinley, Cox's reason for hating Jackman may be that Bill Lawrence envies the actor's talent.

Cox is occasionally seen wearing a Detroit Red Wings jersey. McGinley is a Red Wings fan and a close friend of former Detroit defenceman Chris Chelios, whose name is on the back of Cox's jersey. He has also worn a Cheli's Chili Bar T-shirt, a small chain of restaurants owned by Chelios.

Cox is a graduate of Hale University and Johns Hopkins School of Medicine, the former being a fictional adaptation of Yale University. He joined Sacred Heart likely around the mid 1980s.

Cox is often seen drinking scotch and has acknowledged (humorously) that he has a drinking problem. Cox drinks so much that J.D. fears that Cox will die of liver disease. After making a mistake that results in three deaths, a guilt-ridden Cox goes to work drunk and falls into a deep depression. J.D. eventually helps him forgive himself. Cox's son Jack's first full sentence is "Daddy drinks a lot".

== Relationships with other characters ==
=== In Sacred Heart ===
Cox constantly berates the residents, giving John "J.D." Dorian female nicknames (e.g. "Tiffany", "Jennifer", "Carol", "Betsy", "Lindsey") and regularly calling him "Newbie" in the original series and "Oldie" in the revived series. He also calls Elliot Reid (Sarah Chalke) "Barbie", Turk (Donald Faison) "Gandhi" and Bob Kelso (Ken Jenkins) "Bob-O", "Bobcat", "Bobmeister", "Big Bob", and "Beelzebob". The one person he openly admits to tolerating is head nurse Carla Espinosa (Judy Reyes). Throughout Season 1, he and Turk compete for her affections, with Cox eventually bowing out when he sees that Turk and Carla are in love. In one episode, it is seen that Cox helped Turk with how to deal with women when they are angry, Turk eventually taking his advice. Turk soon learns that Carla and Cox went on a date before Turk came to the hospital.

Despite his contempt for Turk in early seasons, Cox develops a restrained level of respect for him, and even occasionally gets along with and relates to him. In the Season 6 episode "My Road to Nowhere", when complications are found with his unborn child, he insists that Turk assist with the surgery. He even appoints Turk as the Chief Surgeon of Sacred Heart. Cox makes this decision after being told by Kelso that his own promotions by Kelso were against the latter's personal disdain for Cox, yet Cox's excellent medical knowledge made him the best candidate – a feature that Turk shares with Cox.

He berates Elliot almost as much as J.D., frequently making fun of her insecurity, hairstyle and WASP background. However, he has also been known to stand up for her; he punches Kelso in the face when he yells at her in front of the staff.

Cox despises Kelso, Sacred Heart's chief of medicine. They disagree constantly about the best way to provide care, with Cox advocating for patients and Kelso adhering to the hospital's bottom line. At one point, he even punches Kelso in the face. On occasion, however, they have acknowledged the necessity of the other's position, and Kelso has admitted that they need each other. When Kelso retires and Cox succeeds him as chief of medicine, Cox confides in him about the pressures of the job, and the two form a "secret friendship".

While Cox has had limited interactions with veteran nurse Laverne Roberts (Aloma Wright), his cynicism drives him to mock her strong religious beliefs on occasion. This culminates in Cox confronting her about a seemingly "miraculous" accident, unwilling to accept it as divine intervention. Visibly upset, Laverne replies that after 24 years as a nurse, she has to believe in a "bigger plan" or she would lose all hope. Taken aback, Cox uncharacteristically apologizes and sincerely replies that he wishes he could also believe that. When she dies in the following episode, he joins the rest of the staff in bidding her farewell and drinking in her honor.

He berates J.D. from their first meeting and emphatically denies being his mentor, despite J.D.'s repeated attempts to win his favor. Nonetheless, Cox has shown concern for J.D.'s welfare, such as telling him not to blame himself for a patient's death and (reluctantly) comforting him when his father dies. He also tells J.D. that he trusts him as a doctor and a person and has taken an interest in him from the start because he seems "to actually give a crap". Cox also recommends him as a promising, skilled, and hard-working doctor to a review board. In "My Finale", Cox finally admits that he considers J.D. a talented doctor, a good person, and a friend, although he has to be tricked into it. He refuses to say this directly to J.D. or to hug him. A flash-forward scene at the end of the episode suggests that Cox will be a part of J.D.'s life well into the future (reluctantly, of course).

In the ninth season, Sacred Heart has become a medical school, and Cox is hired as a professor. He immediately begins berating the series' new protagonist, Lucy Bennett (Kerry Bishé), and takes an interest in one of his students, Drew Suffin (Michael Mosley). He calls the latter "Number 1" and makes him his protégé, much to J.D.'s chagrin. However, he still provides advice and support to J.D. (albeit in his usual sarcastic fashion) by telling him that he has to learn to let his students make their own mistakes.

The tenth season opens with Cox still serving as Sacred Heart's chief of medicine. He is shown to have a civil relationship with attending physician Dr. Kevin Park, who is teaching him Korean and is aware of Cox's past history with J.D. After one of J.D.'s concierge patients is admitted to Sacred Heart, Cox uses the opportunity to reconnect with his former student and even arranges to keep the patient overnight to keep J.D. around longer. He finally admits to J.D. that the current world of medicine has passed him by and he no longer knows how to be a teacher to his newest crop of interns. He asks J.D. to come back to Sacred Heart and succeed him as Chief of Medicine, going on to say that J.D. is the only one he trusts with such a responsibility. J.D. reluctantly accepts and Cox steps down.

He returns in the penultimate episode, "My Odds", ostensibly for dinner plans with Dr. Park, but it is revealed that he has been having health problems. Turk, Elliot and especially J.D. all show concern for his health and Cox admits he regrets the way he nearly pushed Elliot out of medicine. Cox is eventually diagnosed with an microscopic polyangiitis, a rare autoimmune disease. Despite knowing the difficulties associated with such a disease, J.D. vows to be there for Cox and Cox displays a rare moment of vulnerability with J.D., making his former student promise to keep him alive for a long time as he doesn't want his death to be what makes J.D. a cold cynic. Cox starts treatments in the following episode "My Celebration". When tests come back with less than positive results, Perry resolves to continue fighting with the support of Jordan and J.D.

=== Family life ===
Cox grew up in an Irish-American family in Pittsburgh, Pennsylvania. He has a sister, Paige (Cheryl Hines), who is a born-again Christian. Cox is presented as an ardent skeptic who says that he does not "technically believe" in God. His political views are varied; he has expressed disdain for members of both political parties, as well as "registered Independents". He opposes the Iraq War and is disgusted when Elliot reveals that she is a Republican. He also uses "Republican" as an insult for Paige.

Cox's father was an alcoholic who regularly beat him and Paige, and Cox later says that his mother did nothing to stop him when he "drunkenly knocked us from room to room". At the end of one episode, he admits to his sister that seeing her reminds him of the childhood he has tried so hard to forget.

Cox was apparently legally divorced from Jordan Sullivan (Christa Miller Lawrence), but the two have lived together in an exclusive relationship since Jordan discovered she was pregnant. The marriage appears to have started out strongly, but went downhill after Jordan cheated on him with Dr. Peter Fisher (Jay Mohr). They were originally to have divorced after their first child died in infancy, but this plot point was omitted because the network decided that it was too dark a twist in the story. Later in the series, it is revealed that Sacred Heart's incompetent lawyer Ted Buckland (Sam Lloyd) did not submit the divorce papers properly, so Cox and Jordan have been married during the entire run of the show. They immediately resume the role of husband and wife since they have already reconciled, but they quickly become dissatisfied with being an ordinary married couple, so they agree to go back to acting as though they were divorced, even going so far as to actually legally divorce, with Ted (again) ending their marriage. In later seasons, Cox quietly resumes wearing his wedding ring, and Jordan soon acquiesces to the marriage title after the birth of their second child, and it is implied that they have remarried.

He has two children with Jordan: a son named Jack and, after an unsuccessful vasectomy, a daughter named Jennifer Dylan (J.D.). Jack is played by Andrew Miller and his twin brother (although in a cameo appearance in "My Missed Perception", he is played by Bill Lawrence and Christa Miller's son, William). When Jordan first becomes pregnant with Jack, she tells Cox that she was impregnated by a Greek bellboy, wanting Cox to stay because he wants to rather than out of obligation to his child. At first, Cox feels nothing for the then-nameless boy, but begins to feel a connection after the child responds to the name Jack, which Cox had been trying to impress upon him for some time. J.D.'s college friend Spencer (Ryan Reynolds) accidentally tells Cox that he is actually Jack's biological father, and he takes on the role of father much more seriously. Cox has a very unorthodox way of raising Jack, often treating him like his "drinking buddy". Nonetheless, Cox loves his son and tries fervently to be a better father than his own was. He often talks to Jack in lieu of a therapist. He also dotes on his daughter; among other things, he goes far out of his way to have someone else give her a shot so that she will not associate him with pain.

Cox is best friends with Jordan's brother, Ben (Brendan Fraser), and is hit hard when he is diagnosed with leukemia; he is initially too afraid to treat him because he fears he will lose him. He rallies, however, and helps Ben go into remission. Ben dies in the episode "My Screw Up", but Cox convinces himself that he is still alive. When he finally admits that Ben is dead, he is devastated, and uncharacteristically allows people to comfort him at the funeral.
