= Christopher Turk =

Turk
- Scrubs (2001) and Scrubs (2026) character
- First appearance: "My First Day" (2001)
- Created by: Bill Lawrence
- Portrayed by: Donald Faison

In-universe information
- Nicknames: Chris, Turk, Brown Bear, Chocolate Bear, C-Bear, Black Whale, Turk Turkleton, Turkleberry, Gumball, Gandhi
- Gender: Male
- Title: Chief of Surgery
- Occupation: Surgeon
- Family: Mr. Turk (father); Margaret Turk (mother); Kevin Turk (brother); Bob "Jabbari" Turk (brother); Unnamed sister
- Spouse: Carla Espinosa
- Children: Isabella "Izzy" Turk (daughter); Ellie Turk (daughter); Sofia Turk (daughter); Nora Turk (daughter)
- Relatives: George (cousin)
- Religion: Roman Catholic

Christopher "Chris" Duncan Turk, M.D., commonly referred to mononymously by his last name "Turk", is a fictional character in the 2001–2010 comedy-drama television series Scrubs and its 2026 revival series, played by Donald Faison. Turk appeared in every episode of the original series except three season 8 episodes, "My Saving Grace", "My New Role" and "My Lawyer's in Love".

== Overview ==
Commonly known by his surname, "Turk" is the best friend and former roommate of the series' protagonist, J.D. (Zach Braff). Turk was J.D.'s roommate at the College of William and Mary and at medical school, and the two have an extremely close relationship, which is best described as "guy love" in the season 6 episode "My Musical". J.D. claims that Turk's middle name, Duncan, was chosen due to his father's love of doughnuts.

Starting in season 1 as a surgical intern, he works his way up to attending surgeon (season 5) and later the chief of surgery (seasons 8 and 9) at Sacred Heart Hospital, where the series takes place. In season 1, he begins dating Carla Espinosa (Judy Reyes), the Head Nurse; at the end of season 3, they get married. He and Carla have an infant daughter, Isabella ("Izzy"), as well as another daughter mentioned in season 8 and 9.

== Personality ==
Turk is an extroverted, competitive "alpha male". He says that his competitive nature drove him to "play everything" in high school, and also cites it as the main reason that he became a surgeon. At one point, he also says "winning is more important than friendship. My Gram-Gram taught me that". It also accounts for his antagonistic relationship with Chief Attending Physician Dr. Perry Cox (John C. McGinley); in season 1, they compete for Carla's affections, and consistently insult and annoy each other throughout the series. At this point, Faison had hoped Dr. Cox would succeed, so he could act in multiple relationships. In a season 6 episode, they fight a battle of wits over a hypochondriac patient (Richard Kind). Turk eventually tricks Cox into losing, eliciting Cox's grudging respect.

Turk is portrayed as a devout Christian. His faith in God is shaken after being on call for Christmas Eve, during which he treats several people suffering horrific injuries. He feels lost, but his faith is restored after he finds a runaway patient giving birth and helps deliver the child.

Turk is often referred to as "Turkleton" by Dr. Bob Kelso (Ken Jenkins), Sacred Heart's Chief of Medicine. It even gets to the point that at Carla and Turk's reception, Kelso drunkenly stated that he thinks Turk's name is Turk Turkleton. Kelso also refers to Carla as "Nurse Turkleton".

== Family life ==
Turk has two brothers: Kevin (D.L. Hughley), who paid for Turk's college and medical school; and Jabbari (formerly Bob), who is described as "militant". He also has a "bipolar Aunt Leslie". He also mentions a sister. Turk notes that while his family is dysfunctional, it is very close. Turk's mother is a Jehovah's Witness, although Turk himself is Roman Catholic as evidenced by his attendance of Mass and his wearing of a small crucifix around his neck. His Father is never seen but JD picks up the phone when he rings Turk at the flat he shares with JD. Turk is also one-eighth Japanese.

Carla catches Turk's eye immediately, although she is reluctant to go out with him at first because of his arrogance, purely physical attraction to her, and his god complex. He impresses her by telling her that she should give Elliot Reid (Sarah Chalke), with whom she does not get along, a break; she agrees to a date with him, and they soon become a serious item. In season two, they get engaged after Carla initially rejects his proposal. They then spend the whole of season 3 planning their wedding, which happens, albeit with a few problems, in the season finale.

During season 4, the two experience some marital trouble; they briefly separate when Carla finds out that Turk is maintaining a friendship with an ex-girlfriend without telling her that he is married. The situation is worsened when Carla and J.D. share a "friend kiss" after getting drunk together. Eventually, the two fix their relationship, and at the end of season four they agree to begin trying to have a baby. They spend most of season 5 trying to conceive, finally succeeding after a few months. Their baby, Isabella, is born after some complications in "My Best Friend's Baby's Baby and My Baby's Baby".

In the fourth season, Turk is diagnosed with type two diabetes; he initially jokes about this as a way of coping with his fear about the disease, but learns to take it seriously. In the seventh season, Turk has a testicle removed after his daughter, Izzy, kicks him in the groin, causing testicular torsion.

By Season 10, Turk and Carla now have four daughters together, Izzy, Ella, Sofia and Nora.

=== Relationship with J.D. ===
Turk and J.D. are best friends and surrogate brothers. They both attended the College of William and Mary (Scrubs creator Bill Lawrence's alma mater), where they roomed together. They share a goofy sense of humor; for example, they both enjoy dancing "the robot", "dramatic slow running", pretending to be "multi-ethnic Siamese doctor", and also pretending to be the "World's Most Giant Doctor." He and J.D. own a stuffed Yellow Labrador Retriever named Rowdy which they treat like a live dog. J.D. acts as best man at Turk's wedding, and is Izzy's godfather.

There have been several joking allusions to the fact that they are so close as to almost be a couple. However, they best explain their relationship in their duet "Guy Love": "It's Guy Love/That's all it is/It's Guy Love/He's mine, I'm his/There's nothing gay about it in our eyes." Carla is generally supportive of Turk and J.D.'s close relationship, although she occasionally gets jealous. While witnessing their ecstatic reunion after she and Turk return from their honeymoon, for example, she wistfully remarks, "Maybe one day he'll love me like that". She also refers to J.D. as Turk's "boyfriend", and introduces him to the newborn Izzy as "the man you'll be competing with for your father's love."

When J.D. leaves Sacred Heart in the eighth-season finale, Turk makes a large banner outside the hospital that says "Goodbye J.D.". Though the two realize that their relationship will never be the same, they still remain best friends. In J.D.'s fantasy/flashforward, the Turk family spends a Christmas together with J.D. and Elliot (formerly married), as well as Dr. Cox's family.

When J.D. returns to Sacred Heart in Season 10 and becomes the new Chief of Medicine, it allows he and Turk to finally fulfill their dream of running the hospital together. Their friendship has remained strong since J.D.'s departure, though Turk's sciatica now prevents them from doing their trademark "Eagle" pose.

== Work ==
Turk begins his career as a surgical intern at Sacred Heart hospital. Along with the other interns, he becomes a resident and eventually, an attending physician. At the end of the eighth season, Dr. Cox, Sacred Heart's new Chief of Medicine, makes Turk the hospital's Chief of Surgery. In the ninth season, Turk becomes a visiting professor of surgery at Winston University, a medical school built on the site of the old Sacred Heart facility, which was torn down.

Turk is the "singer" in an air-band, Cool Cats, with The Janitor (Neil Flynn), Ted Buckland (Sam Lloyd), and Lloyd the Delivery Man (Mike Schwartz).

== Production details ==
- The episode "My Malpractical Decision" reveals that Turk's cell phone number is (916) CALL-TUR (225-5887), although he states that he hopes that people will dial the 'K' anyway. At first, fans who dialed the phone number found themselves connected to an actual phone located on set. Several fans reported many cast and crew members picking up the phone and having live conversations with them (Zach Braff, who plays J.D., accounted for this in his own blog). The phone soon became overloaded with calls, and callers were re-directed to a voice mail message from Turk or Carla announcing that Turk was out, but would be back at the start of the next season. The voice mail was later changed to one in which Braff promoted his film Garden State. As of December 2006, the message was one of Neil Flynn (who plays the Janitor) advertising for the season premiere of Scrubs. As of February 2007, the message changed to one of Sacred Heart's security guard, Leonard, promoting Scrubs on Comedy Central. As of January 2008, the message is of Doug Murphy (Johnny Kastl), one of the show's supporting characters, promoting the Scrubs blog and podcast. As of July 2008, the message was of the Janitor saying "...this is J.D., I can't get to the phone right now, but leave a message and I'll call you back immediately. If I don't, feel free to come after me and personally harm me." He then advertises the episode "My Princess". As of April 2009, the message is Dr. Cox advertising the new season on ABC. As of May 2009, when the number is dialed the automatic message "I'm sorry, the number you have called is not in service. Please check the number and dial again," suggesting that the number had been deactivated. As of February 2010, the number reached a message saying that the mailbox was full, suggesting the number had been reconnected. As of 2013 the number belongs to a cell phone that belongs to a private citizen in the Sacramento, California area.
- Turk's name is based on that of real-life physician Dr. Jon Turk, a medical consultant for Scrubs.

== The Turk dance ==
The season five episode, "My Half-Acre", famously features a scene where Turk, in an attempt to audition for the Janitor's band, proceeds to pull off an impromptu dance. In 2017, the dance would be referred to as the "Default Dance" in the popular video game Fortnite, called so as it is the default dance emote that is applied to the player character. Faison stated that the dance was his own creation and could have been copyrighted, however he did not see the need to, and thus, does not receive any royalties from Epic Games (the company that developed Fortnite) for its use.
