= Elliot Reid =

American TV fictional character

Dr. Elliot Reid, M.D.
- Scrubs character
- First appearance: "My First Day" (2001)
- Created by: Bill Lawrence
- Portrayed by: Sarah Chalke; Alexandra Lee (child)

In-universe information
- Nicknames: Barbie, Blonde Doctor
- Gender: Female
- Title: Private Practice Physician
- Occupation: Doctor of Internal Medicine
- Family: Dr. Simon Reid (father); Lily Reid (mother); Dr. Barry Reid (brother); Dr. Bradley Reid (brother); Sam Dorian (father-in-law, deceased); Barbara Hobbs Dorian (mother-in-law); Dan Dorian (brother-in-law); Nana Hobbs (grandmother-in-law); Grandma Dorian (grandmother-in-law, deceased)
- Spouse: J.D. (ex-husband)
- Significant others: Sean Kelly; Keith Dudemeister
- Children: Ollie Dorian; Sam Perry Gilligan Dorian (former step-son)

Elliot Reid M.D. is a fictional character played by Sarah Chalke in the American comedy-drama Scrubs. She appeared in every episode during the first eight seasons, except for two Season 8 episodes, "My Last Words" and "My Lawyer's in Love".

Chalke was a regular cast member for the first eight seasons and appeared in a recurring role in four episodes of Season 9. Elliot is a close friend and a frequent love interest to protagonist John "J.D." Dorian (Zach Braff) for the first eight seasons, and she becomes his wife at the end of season eight. The character of Elliot Reid is also close to other series characters, including Carla Espinosa (Judy Reyes) and Christopher Turk (Donald Faison).

== Family history ==
The character of Elliot Reid is described as the daughter of Simon and Lily Reid (Lane Davies and Markie Post). Her father was a former Chief of Medicine at St. Augustine's, a private hospital in Greenwich, Connecticut. Her mother is portrayed as a cold, self-absorbed alcoholic. Her father regularly tries to interfere with her career over the course of the show. He eventually cuts her off financially after he tries to push her to specialize in gynecology but she refuses. Her parents overall cut her off because they feel it’s time for her to be independent. Elliot has several brothers, who are also doctors, but they are never portrayed on the show. One of these unseen characters is her brother Barry, a closeted homosexual whom their parents sent to a "hetero camp." She used to play "Wonder Twins" with another one of her brothers, Bradley.

== Career ==
Elliot is described as the valedictorian of her high school and an alumna of Brown University.

She begins the show as an intern at the fictional Sacred Heart Hospital and later becomes a resident. She serves as a co-chief resident with J.D. during Season 4. At the end of that season, she briefly leaves to take an endocrinology fellowship, which ends five days later after her research partner finds a cure for osteogenesis imperfecta, the disease they were hired to research. After a brief spell at a free clinic, the character returns to Sacred Heart and becomes a senior attending physician. At the end of the episode "My Coffee", she accepts an offer to go into private practice. In "My Full Moon", she ponders her future career after struggling to deliver the bad news to a patient diagnosed with H.I.V. She tells Turk that if she were lucky enough to get married and to have enough money to survive without working, she would "walk out of this place and never look back." In the tenth season, Elliot is back on the staff of Sacred Heart as the head of their simulation program, forcing her to navigate a new dynamic with J.D., her ex-husband and now boss.

== Peculiarities ==
When first introduced, Elliot was portrayed as socially awkward and hyper-competitive, but her personality was modified slightly by the second episode. According to Chalke, her character was shown to totally lack "social skills." She is characterized as a chatterbox who puts her foot in her mouth at every conceivable opportunity (in "My Mentor," she asks an overweight woman, "When's the baby due?" and accidentally insults Turk's Jehovah's Witness mother by describing people of that faith as "crazed, annoying busybodies"). According to J.D. and various patients, her bedside manner is cold and mechanical, although in later seasons she is shown to bond with several patients. Her bedside manner (or lack thereof) is part of the reason that Dr. Cox decides to split the role of chief resident between her and the more sensitive J.D. (saying the two of them together would make "one barely passable doctor/Labradoodle").

Elliot is frequently shown telling "inspirational stories" to fellow staff and patients that invariably ended with someone committing suicide. "My Happy Place" has become the expected result of any story she begins. In the episode "My Fishbowl," she admits that she tried to kill herself as a teenager by filling her pockets with rocks and walking into a lake like her favorite author, Virginia Woolf. However, the attempt failed when someone rowing a boat in the lake accidentally struck her on the head with an oar.

In Season 3, Elliot undergoes a notable transformation; she begins dressing and grooming herself in a more sexually provocative manner and adopts a somewhat more assertive and self-assured personality. This was the result of a directive from NBC's marketing department, which wanted the show to have a sexier female star for the network's coveted young male demographic. A short feature on the Season 3 DVD set titled "The New Elliot" explained the reasons for the makeover and the response it engendered from Chalke and the show's writers.

Chalke, speaking about her character, has noted how much Elliot changed through the run of Scrubs. At the start of the series, Elliot was a competitive and independent person until she realized that she needed the help and support of her co-workers. Chalke said that Elliot's transformation in the episode "My Own American Girl" did not really help her life, and that Elliot was still "on a never-ending journey to find respect [in Season 4], and now she's a lot more confident and together."

== Relationships with other characters ==
=== J.D. ===
J.D. and Elliot have a complex relationship; they are close friends and often grapple with their romantic feelings for each other. In an interview, Sarah Chalke said that Bill Lawrence, the creator of Scrubs, wanted to avoid a "will they or won't they get together" plot for the series, instead opting for a running gag where they hook up once a year and have "everything blow up in [their] faces and not work out."

In the Season 1 episode "My Drug Buddy," they start a relationship, but break up in the following episode upon realizing that they don't work as a couple. They mend their friendship, but it is later revealed that they still have feelings for each other, and they begin sleeping together again in "My Monster." They decide to be "sex buddies" without any romantic involvement, but this ends after only a few days, with J.D. realizing that he has deep feelings for her. In Season 3, J.D. again realizes his feelings for her as she rekindles her relationship with an old boyfriend, Sean. Later in the season, J.D. and Elliot sleep together again. Although Elliot initially decides to stay with Sean, she later leaves him to be with J.D. However, J.D. soon breaks up with Elliot after realizing that he doesn't love her after all. In Season 4, following Elliot's brief fling with J.D.'s brother, Dan (Tom Cavanagh), they once again repair their friendship and then move in together in Season 5, after J.D has nowhere to live.

J.D. and Elliot also have a very close friendship built on their shared experiences as residents at the hospital, similarities in their personalities, and their knowledge of each other's quirks and issues. In the episode "My Cold Shower," J.D. realizes that he might still be in love with Elliot after she gets engaged; in the Season 6 finale, "My Point of No Return," they lean in for a kiss after a night of discussing their doubts about their respective relationships. However, in "My Own Worst Enemy," the Season 7 opener, Elliot realizes she is making a mistake and pulls away, asserting that the almost-kiss had nothing to do with her feelings for J.D.

Later in Season 7, there are some subtle hints that Elliot and J.D. might be getting closer, and possibly romantically involved. For instance, the episode "My Waste of Time" ends with J.D. and Elliot sitting in a cafe, commenting on how everyone thought they were together, then playing with J.D.'s son, Sam, as if they were a family. Also, in "My Bad Too," Turk tells Carla (in unsubtitled Spanish), "Those two will be getting back together in five weeks." In the Season 7 finale, "My Princess," Elliot and J.D. agree that the almost-kiss, a point of tension between them, has nothing to do with their feelings and has merely been a response to stress. In the Season 8 episode "My Happy Place," Elliot and J.D. reevaluate their relationship, admitting their lingering feelings for each other. However, it is only after Dr. Kelso tells them to do whatever makes them happy that they decide to give their relationship another chance. In "My Cookie Pants," J.D. and Elliot are shown to be a confirmed couple again.

In the Season 8 episode "My Cuz," J.D. leaves Sacred Heart to move closer to his son. Though Elliot remained at Sacred Heart, she moved in with J.D., despite the long commute. Before J.D. left the hospital for good, he had a prolonged fantasy (implied to be a flash-forward) that showed him and Elliot getting married and having at least one child together. By the start of Season 9, set a year after the Season 8 finale, they were married and expecting their first child-a daughter. In the Season 10 premiere, J.D. reveals that he and Elliot are divorced, and have a child, Ollie.

=== Carla ===
Elliot and Carla initially clash over their duties at the hospital and Elliot's somewhat condescending attitude, but they gradually become close friends. Carla becomes a source of personal and professional advice for Elliot; for her part, Carla reveals before her wedding that she feels closer to Elliot than to her own sisters. After Carla's marriage, the two begin to drift apart, but when they realize it, they vow to work harder on maintaining their friendship. Elliot lets Carla stay with her when her marriage to Turk hits a rough patch, while Carla supports Elliot through her various breakups and is overjoyed to see Elliot and J.D. become a couple again.

Cast and crew members have commented that the development of Carla and Elliot's friendship was somewhat parallel to the development of that between Chalke and Judy Reyes, who played Carla.

=== Turk ===
Despite clashing initially, Elliot and Turk grow to be friends, a relationship begun in "My Mentor" when Turk tells Carla to give Elliot a break. In "My Heavy Meddle," he convinces Elliot, who had just broken up with J.D., to mend their relationship for the sake of the group dynamic. Throughout the series, Turk watches out for Elliot, J.D., and Carla, and occasionally acts as a go-between. The flash-forward scene at the end of "My Finale" shows all of them together as a happy family.

=== Dr. Cox ===
In Season 1, Elliot is alternately terrified of and eager to please Dr. Perry Cox, Sacred Heart's acerbic chief attending physician (later residency director and chief of medicine). Cox responds by constantly berating her, a trend that would continue throughout the series. He occasionally shows signs of support, however; in "My Blind Date," he relies on her as a replacement "go-to guy" when J.D. is busy, and in "My Dream Job," he defends her from Kelso's verbal abuse by punching him.

From Season 3 on, their relationship is one of mutual contempt, based mostly on trading quips and insults. Even so, Cox continues to give her personal and professional advice (albeit in the form of mockery), and in "My Déjà Vu, My Déjà Vu," they admit that, while they don't like each other, they do respect each other.

=== Molly Clock ===
Molly Clock (Heather Graham) is Elliot's close friend and mentor in Season 4; in "Her Story," Elliot sees Molly as a role model even after Molly makes some questionable choices. Molly moves to Milwaukee in "My Last Chance" and tells J.D. to ask Elliot's permission for the two of them to sleep together; Elliot uses the situation to get even with J.D. for breaking up with her.

=== Janitor ===
Elliot and the Janitor have a friendly if asymmetric relationship; she views him as a nice hospital employee, while he harbours an intense schoolboy crush on her. She finally realizes his feelings for her in "My Best Laid Plans," when he confesses them outright and goes on to say that she is the only doctor who treats him like a person. The Janitor's nickname for Elliot is "Blonde Doctor."

=== Romantic relationships ===
In Season 1, she dates her former patient Sean Kelly (Scott Foley). In Season 2, she dates Nurse Paul Flowers (Rick Schroder). In Season 3, she meets Sean again and starts a new relationship with him, but when J.D. reveals his feelings for her, she leaves Sean. In Season 4, Elliot dates J.D.'s brother, Dan (Tom Cavanagh), and then a man named Jake (Josh Randall). They break up when Elliot realizes that he does not really know her. In Season 6, Elliot gets engaged to fellow Sacred Heart doctor Keith Dudemeister (Travis Schuldt), but breaks it off when she realizes that she does not truly love him. Following her divorce from J.D., Elliot beings dating a pilot named Wes (Andy Ridings) in season 10.

==== Keith Dudemeister ====
Elliot starts a sex-only relationship with intern Keith Dudemeister in "My Buddy's Booty," much to J.D.'s chagrin. Eventually, they begin a romantic relationship and, after navigating a rough patch, declare their love for each other. Keith proposes to Elliot at the end of "My Turf War," and she says yes in the following episode. However, Elliot soon realizes that she does not truly love him, and she cancels the wedding. He despises her for the rest of the season, but they finally bury the hatchet in the Season 8 episode "My Jerks," when she apologizes for hurting him.

==== Sean Kelly ====
Elliot meets Sean (Scott Foley) in the Season 1 episode "My Way or the Highway," when he is a patient of hers. Knowing that he has many of the same insecurities as her, Elliot is instantly attracted to him and eventually asks him out. Their relationship ends in "My Sacrificial Clam," however, when Elliot finds herself unable to juggle a relationship with the stresses of her internship.

Elliot meets Sean again at the beginning of Season 3 when he is with another girl. They begin dating again (much to J.D.'s consternation). Although their relationship is strong, Sean tries to end it in "My Lucky Night" when he has to move to New Zealand for six months, because he does not believe in long-distance relationships. Elliot nevertheless convinces him that they can make it work. However, in "His Story II," Elliot comes to believe during Sean's absence that J.D. loves her more and sleeps with him, only to realize the depth of Sean's commitment when he returns from New Zealand. She then goes back to Sean. J.D. initially agrees to remain silent, but when Sean and Elliot begin planning to move in together, J.D. tells Elliot how he feels, prompting her to leave Sean for an ultimately doomed relationship with J.D. After breaking up with Elliot in "My Self-Examination," J.D. finds a depressed Sean and tries to get him to take Elliot back in "My Best Friend's Wedding." Sean arrives at Turk and Carla's wedding to talk to Elliot about their relationship, but they do not get back together — to the disappointment of J.D., who was trying to repair their relationship and, in turn, his own friendship with Elliot.

Sean appears again in the Season 8 episode "My Cuz," in a relationship with Kim Briggs (Elizabeth Banks), the mother of J.D.'s child, Sam. It is revealed that Sean and Kim had been introduced by Elliot before she and J.D. got back together, irritating both J.D. and Sean, who still harbour a mutual dislike.
