= Laverne Roberts =

- First appearance: "My First Day" (2001)
- Last appearance: "My Finale" (2009)
- Created by: Bill Lawrence
- Portrayed by: Aloma Wright

In-universe information
- Gender: Female
- Occupation: Nurse
- Family: Lance (nephew), unnamed brother, son
- Spouse: Lester Roberts

Laverne Roberts is a fictional character in the sitcom Scrubs, played by Aloma Wright. She is a nurse at Sacred Heart.

== Character biography ==
In her free time, Laverne enjoys soap operas and office gossip. She is a devout Christian and had strong opinions on premarital sex, abortion, and other actions. She maintains much of her religious devotion to cope with seeing suffering and death in the hospital every day. Laverne is one of the few staff members who can intimidate imposing employees such as Dr. Cox, the Janitor, Dr. Kelso, and Carla, with whom she is especially close. Laverne has a husband named Lester, a son, and a nephew named Lance who fought in the Iraq War. She and Lester are shown to have marital problems, and her attempts to fix them are unsuccessful.

While driving to the hospital one morning in the sixth season episode "My Long Goodbye", Laverne is involved in a car crash, falls into a coma, and is put on life support. Her family decides to take her off after learning that she is brain dead. Employees of the hospital visit her and speak to her, saying final goodbyes. Carla, unable to admit that Laverne has no chance of recovering, avoids this and is followed around by a manifestation of her feelings in the shape of Laverne. The manifestation disappears once Carla finally says goodbye to Laverne, who dies almost immediately afterward. Her character makes a brief appearance in a flashback in "My Comedy Show" and in the Season 8 finale, in J.D.'s last fantasy.

=== Nurse Shirley ===
Nurse Shirley Roberts
- First appearance: "My Hard Labor" (2007)
- Last appearance: "My Princess" (2008)
- Created by: Bill Lawrence; Bill Callahan
- Portrayed by: Aloma Wright

In-universe information
- Gender: Female
- Occupation: Nurse

After Scrubs was renewed for a seventh season, creator Bill Lawrence promised Aloma Wright another role, because he had killed off Laverne under the impression that the show was in its final season. Wright played a new character similar to Laverne, but only J.D. could see the similarities. Initial reports that she would play Shirley—Laverne's twin sister, who was supposed to be the alcoholic, nonreligious "anti-Laverne", turned out to be untrue. The new character is seen briefly while Kim Briggs is giving birth. J.D. sees the physical similarities between Laverne and Nurse Shirley, and gave her the nickname "Laverneagain", which she despises. After joining the staff of Sacred Heart at the beginning of Season 7, Shirley apparently develops a close friendship with the Janitor.

== Reception ==
Screen Rant said in 2024 that the creators of the show should fix the mistake of killing off Laverne in the lead up to the revival series.
