= Travis Schuldt =

American actor (b. 1974)

- Born: September 18, 1974 (age 52); Topeka, Kansas, U.S.
- Occupation: Actor
- Years active: 1999–present
- Spouse: Natalie Zea (m. 2014)
- Children: 1

Travis Schuldt (born September 18, 1974) is an American actor. He originated the role of Ethan Winthrop on Passions, and played the recurring roles of Keith Dudemeister on Scrubs, Rick/Subway on Community, and Ben Smith on It's Always Sunny in Philadelphia.

== Personal life ==
Schuldt was born in Topeka, Kansas. He became engaged to actress Natalie Zea after eleven years together, in June 2013. The couple married on July 16, 2014, in Hawaii. In June 2015, they announced that they were expecting their first child together. In October 2015, Zea gave birth to a daughter.

== Career ==
His theatre credits include Glengarry Glen Ross, The Taming of the Shrew, Macbeth, and The Madwoman of Chaillot. Schuldt co-produced and starred in Sam Shepard's Icarus's Mother, James Kerwin's adaptations of Shakespeare's Venus and Adonis and Cardenio, and Amber Benson's Albert Hall.

Schuldt's first major television role was on the NBC soap opera Passions, in which he originated the role of Ethan Crane, before leaving the series at the end of his three-year contract in 2002. He played the recurring role of Keith Dudemeister on Scrubs from 2006 to 2009. He also has made appearances on other television shows, such as Veronica Mars, My Boys, True Jackson, VP, and Rules of Engagement, and was a regular on the ABC police drama 10-8: Officers on Duty from 2003 to 2004. He appeared in the 2007 horror films The Hitcher and Hack!.

In 2008, he appeared in the original pilot for the ABC sitcom Cavemen, as well as in an episode of the CBS sitcom The Big Bang Theory. That same year, Schuldt had roles in the comedy films Private Valentine: Blonde & Dangerous alongside Jessica Simpson and An American Carol. In October 2009, he guest-starred on the Fringe episode "Dream Logic" and the It's Always Sunny in Philadelphia episodes "The Gang Wrestles for the Troops", "The D.E.N.N.I.S. System", "Mac's Big Break", and "Dee Gives Birth" as recurring character Ben Smith. In March 2012, he guest-starred as Subway/Rick on the Community episode "Digital Exploration of Interior Design". Schuldt reprised his role on the season six episode "Advanced Safety Features" in April 2015. In November 2017, it was announced Schuldt would guest-star on General Hospital.

== Filmography ==
=== Film ===
Year	Title	Role	Notes
1999	Midsummer	Demetrius	Short film
2002	Candy	Luc	
2005	Automatic	Randall Dunn	
2006	Mystery Woman: Oh Baby	Evan Chandler	Television film
2007	The Hitcher	Deputy Harlan Bremmer, Jr.	
2007	Hack!	Tim	
2008	From a Place of Darkness	Miles Kody	
2008	A Line in the Sand	Newscaster	
2008	Something's Wrong in Kansas	Juice	
2008	An American Carol	Josh	
2008	Private Valentine: Blonde & Dangerous	SFC Harrison	
2012	Hitting the Cycle	Patrick	
2012	The Giant Mechanical Man	Hal Baker	
2013	This Magic Moment	Clark Gable	Hallmark film
2015	The Boy Next Door	Ethan	
2016	DriverX	Harry	

=== Television ===
Year	Title	Role	Notes
1999–2002	Passions	Ethan Winthrop	Role held: July 5, 1999 – July 3, 2002
2003	JAG	Petty Officer Marin	Episode: "Empty Quiver"
2003	Baby Bob	Tim	Episode: "Don't Pass Me By"
2003–2004	10-8: Officers on Duty	Deputy Chase Williams	Main cast; 12 episodes
2004	Veronica Mars	Conner Larkin	Episode: "An Echolls Family Christmas"
2006–2009	Scrubs	Keith Dudemeister	39 episodes
2007	My Boys	Matt Dougan	2 episodes
2008	The Big Bang Theory	Eric	Episode: "The Codpiece Topology"
2009	Fringe	Agent Kashner	Episode: "Dream Logic"
2009–2018	It's Always Sunny in Philadelphia	Ben Smith	7 episodes
2010	True Jackson, VP	Lance Whipple	Episode: "The Hunky Librarian"
2010	Rules of Engagement	Ryan	Episode: "Harassment"
2010	In Plain Sight	Patrick Hill	Episode: "Death Becomes Her"
2011	Friends with Benefits	Steve	Episode: "The Benefit of Forgetting"
2012	CSI: NY	Aaron Collins	Episode: "Clean Sweep"
2012, 2015	Community	Subway/Rick	2 episodes
2012	Melissa & Joey	Travis Campbell	Episode: "Eat, Pray, Date"
2013	Blue Bloods	Ken	Episode: "Quid Pro Quo"
2013	Kickin' It	Chuck Banner	Episode: "Sensei and Sensibility"
2014	The Mentalist	Curtis Whitaker	Episode: "The Golden Hammer"
2015	CSI: Crime Scene Investigation	Aron Derosa	Episode: "The Last Ride"
2015	The Fosters	Nate	2 episodes
2015	2 Broke Girls	Terry	Episode: "And the Inside-Outside Situation"
2017	General Hospital	Dr. Gregory Zajac	Recurring role
2018	Splitting Up Together	Frank	Episode: "Star of Milo"
2018	Heathers	Coach Cox	Recurring role
2018	American Horror Story	Mr. Campbell	Episode "The End"
2018	The Cool Kids	Walt	Episode: "Sid Comes Out"
2019	The OA	Handley	Episode: "Magic Mirror"
2019	The Detour	Dump	2 episodes
2019	Big Little Lies	Michael Something	2 episodes
2020	9-1-1	Sam Egan	Episode: "What's Next?"
2020	Into the Dark	Nick	Episode: "Good Boy"
2021	Young Sheldon	Justin	Episode: "Crappy Frozen Ice Cream and an Organ Grinder's Monkey"
2023	How I Met Your Father	Dick	Episode: "Not a Mamma Mia"
2025	Mythic Quest	Louis	Episode: "The Fish and the Whale"
2026	High Potential	Theodore "Teddy" Barrow	Episode: "Pie in the Sky"

=== Video games ===
Year	Title	Role	Notes
2011	L.A. Noire	Bernard Metier	Voice
