= Sam Lloyd =

American actor (1963–2020)

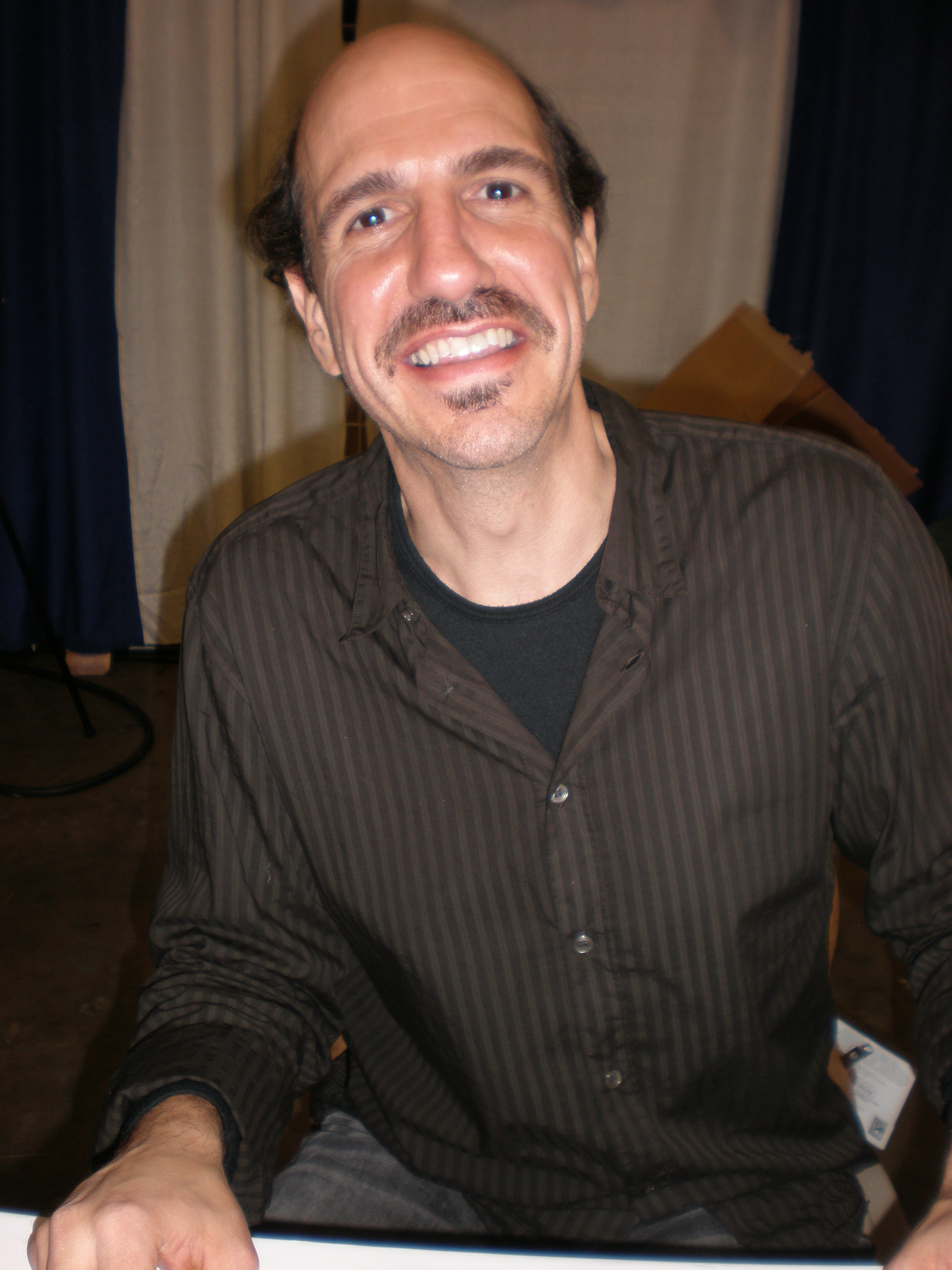
- Lloyd in 2009
- Born: November 12, 1963; Springfield, Vermont, U.S.
- Died: April 30, 2020 (aged 56); Los Angeles, California, U.S.
- Education: Syracuse University
- Occupations: Actor, singer
- Years active: 1988–2020
- Spouse(s): Kristy Willis; Vanessa Lloyd
- Children: 1
- Relatives: Christopher Lloyd (uncle)

Sam Lloyd (November 12, 1963 – April 30, 2020) was an American actor and singer who played lawyer Ted Buckland on the comedy-drama series Scrubs and the sitcom Cougar Town.

== Early life, family and education ==
Lloyd was born in Springfield, Vermont, on November 12, 1963, the son of Marianna McGuffin and Samuel Lloyd Sr., an actor. Sam and his four siblings Laurel, Robin, Sandra, and Jackson have a famous uncle, actor Christopher Lloyd.

Sam attended Syracuse University in the 1980s. There he starred in his friend Paul Perry's student film Fan Mail, which Lloyd described as a "clever, fun, kind of homage to silent films".

== Career ==
Lloyd played lawyer Ted Buckland on the comedy-drama series Scrubs and the sitcom Cougar Town. He and his uncle Christopher both guest-starred on Malcolm in the Middle: Lloyd as a housing lawyer, and his uncle as Hal's father. The two also guested on The West Wing: Lloyd requesting the White House to release information about UFOs, and his uncle as a constitutional law expert. He also appeared in Desperate Housewives as Albert Goldfine, and in two episodes of Seinfeld as Ricky, a man who is obsessed with TV Guide and develops a crush on Elaine. Aside from acting, Lloyd was an accomplished singer with the a cappella group the Blanks, who made many appearances on Scrubs under the name The Worthless Peons (also known as Ted's Band). He also played the bass guitar in a Beatles tribute group called the Butties; although right-handed, he learned to play bass left-handed like Beatles bassist Paul McCartney to maintain authenticity.

== Illness and death ==
In January 2019, Lloyd was diagnosed with an inoperable brain tumor, which was subsequently found to be metastatic lung cancer that had spread to his liver, spine, and jaw. His wife Vanessa had given birth to their son, Weston, in November 2018. He died in Los Angeles on April 30, 2020, at the age of 56.

== Filmography ==
=== Film ===
Title	Year	Role	Notes	Ref(s)
Rising Sun	1993	Rick		
Flubber	1997	Coach Willy Barker		
Galaxy Quest	1999	Neru		
Scorcher	2002	"Fingers"		
The Mudge Boy	2003	Ray Blodgett		
The Real Old Testament	2003	Abraham		
Advantage Hart	2003	Gus Blanderskud	Short	
Spelling Bee	2004	Dr. Jacobs	Short	
The Swidge	2004	Gil	Short	
Back by Midnight	2004	Deputy		
Cry for Help	2005	John	Short	
The Brothers Solomon	2007	Dr. Spencer		
ExTerminators	2009	Hutt		
Super Capers	2009	Herman Brainard		

=== Television ===
Title	Year	Role	Notes	Ref(s)
Night Court	1988–1989	Balloon Salesman / Waiter	2 episodes	
City	1990	Lance Armstrong	Main role, 13 episodes	
Matlock	1992	Waiter	1 episode	
Seinfeld	1993–1994	Ricky	2 episodes	
Double Rush	1995	Barkley	Main role, 13 episodes	
A Bucket of Blood	1995	Leonard	Television movie	
Coach	1996	Ed	1 episode	
Champs	1995	"Bulldog"	1 episode	
Mad About You	1997	Cousin David	2 episodes	
The Drew Carey Show	1997	Jack	1 episode	
3rd Rock from the Sun	1997–1998	Eddie	2 episodes	
Two Guys and a Girl	1999	Career Counsellor	1 episode	
Spin City	1998–2000	Paleontologist / Walter	2 episodes	
The West Wing	1999–2002	Bob Engler	2 episodes	
Battery Park	2000	Roy Galilean / Ray Giddeon	3 episodes	
NYPD Blue	2000	Larry	1 episode	
Scrubs	2001–2009	Ted Buckland	Recurring role, 95 episodes	
The Nightmare Room	2002	Mr. Murphy	1 episode	
Desperate Housewives	2004–2005	Dr. Albert Goldfine	Recurring role, 8 episodes	
Malcolm in the Middle	2005	Jim Fitz	1 episode	
Numb3rs	2009	Group Leader	1 episode	
Medium	2010	Danny Watson	1 episode	
Cougar Town	2011–2012	Ted Buckland	3 episodes	
The Middle	2012–2013	Mr. Walker	3 episodes	
Modern Family	2014–2019	Lester / Bobby	2 episodes	
Bones	2014	Donald McKeon	1 episode	
Shameless	2015	Buddy Diamond	1 episode	
Dr. Ken	2016	Gary	1 episode	
Happy Together	2018	Gene Johnston	1 episode	
American Housewife	2019	Sam Marks	1 episode	
