= Cougar Town season 2 =

Cougar Town
- Season 2
- DVD cover
- No. of episodes: 22

Release
- Original network: ABC
- Original release: September 22, 2010 – May 25, 2011

Season chronology
- ← Previous; Season 1 Next → Season 3

The second season of Cougar Town, an American television series, began airing on September 22, 2010, and concluded on May 25, 2011. Season two regular cast members include Courteney Cox, Christa Miller, Busy Philipps, Brian Van Holt, Dan Byrd, Ian Gomez, and Josh Hopkins. The sitcom was created by Bill Lawrence and Kevin Biegel.

== Casting ==
As of July 30, 2010, former Friends star Jennifer Aniston was in talks with series producers that resulted in her reuniting on-screen with Courteney Cox. Lisa Kudrow guest starred in the season one episode Rhino Skin. On August 23, 2010, ABC announced that Aniston will make a guest appearance on the Season 2 premiere. She will play Glenn, Jules' (played by Cox) shrink. On August 9, 2010, it was confirmed that Ryan Devlin will be back for multiple episodes as Smith, newbie lawyer and love interest of Laurie. Michael Ausiello, from Entertainment Weekly, also reported, on August 4, 2010, that Travis will make a gay friend in this season, and that the show's producers are casting the role of Travis’ "enormous jock-y college roommate" named Kevin. On August 10, 2010, it was revealed that Jeremy Sisto might be playing Ellie's ex-boyfriend, as Christa Miller teased that idea to her husband, the show's creator. On August 11, 2010, it was reported that Bill Lawrence is game on for a Scrubs reunion, where he said that "either Sarah Chalke, Zach Braff, John C. McGinley, Donald Faison or Judy Reyes will be on the show this year". If that reunion episode happen, than it would mark the second time that Christa Miller and John C. McGinley worked together, as they had previously portrayed husband and wife in that show. On September 3, 2010, it was revealed that Ken Jenkins, who previously worked with the show's creator Bill Lawrence in Scrubs, will be portraying Jules father on the Halloween-themed episode, scheduled to air on October 27, 2010. On September 30, 2010, Michael Ausiello reported that Collette Wolfe is joining the series as a love interest for Travis. On October 29, 2010, it was announced by Morgan Jeffery, from Digital Spy, that Zach Braff would guest star in an upcoming episode this season where he'll appear in animated form when Laurie downloads an "appetizer app" to her cell phone that features the star offering culinary advice. On November 2, 2010, it was reported by Matt Webb Mitovich, from Fancast, that newcomer Jennifer Cortese is playing Grayson's ex-wife Vivian, and her first appearance will be on the Thanksgiving episode, When the Time Comes.

== Production ==
On January 12, 2010 Cougar Town was picked up for a second season by ABC. On May 11, 2010, the show's creator, Bill Lawrence, said that he was considering changing the series' title since the name Cougar Town wasn't well received by the viewers. However, on July 30, 2010, he said that the show would keep its original name.

It was announced by ABC that the show would be put on a major hiatus, returning on April 18, 2011, after a shortened Dancing with the Stars and would return to its original timeslot on April 20, 2011 as the new show Mr. Sunshine would premiere in Cougar Town's timeslot.

== Reception ==
The second season of Cougar Town received generally favorable reviews from critics. The season currently holds an average score of 75 out of 100 on Metacritic, based on 7 reviews, indicating 'generally favorable reviews'. Tim Stack from Entertainment Weekly regarded the season in a positive light, citing that "very few shows can get away with genuine moments of emotion while also incorporating the phrase 'dead-baby tacos.'" Hitfix writer Alan Sepinwall also gave a positive review of the show, saying that "midway through the first season the writers realized their cast was so funny together that the wisest course was to just put everyone together as often as possible. By the end of the season, it was often funnier many weeks than the Modern Family episode leading into it. This is still the show that Cougar Town became at mid-season last year."

== Episodes ==
No. overall	No. in season	Title	Directed by	Written by	Original release date	US viewers (millions)
25	1	"All Mixed Up"	Bill Lawrence	Kevin Biegel & Bill Lawrence	September 22, 2010	8.32
The gang creates a new game called Movie Mash-up, where they mix up movies titles and the winner takes wine, and Jules is feeling bad because she's not very good at the game. In the meantime, Jules has been seeing a great shrink named Glenn (Jennifer Aniston), who often regales Jules with stories about her own son, Gabriel, which creates a certain bond between the two of them. When Glenn tells Jules that it's not a bad thing to give Grayson some free time without her, Jules decides to run into Glenn outside her office. However, when Glenn sees Jules coming, she tries to speed away, but she plows into a parked car. Ellie begins to suspect that Glenn might not be as good as Jules thinks when she notes that Glenn hadn't left a note on the person's car. Jules refuses to believe this until she realizes that Gabriel is Glenn's dog, not her son, which is enough to end their good relationship. Bobby has been having a hard time dealing with Jules and Grayson's dating, and he takes out his anger by drawing on Jules' advertising face. Meanwhile, Laurie and Travis make a bet on who can stay awake longer. She cheats, and later tells Travis that she'll miss him. Opening sequence subtitle: (Still)
26	2	"Let Yourself Go"	Michael McDonald	Kevin Biegel	September 29, 2010	6.97
Jules isn't ready to let Travis go to college, so she plans an entire week for them to spend every minute together. However, she is upset when he says that she's smothering him. She's even more upset when he decides to go to college earlier than planned. Jules later learns that she's not the only one that will be missing Travis, as the entire gang will be missing him as well. 20 minutes before he drives away to college, he gives Jules the nice goodbye that she craves, complete with a meaningful glance. Laurie shows Bobby how to use the computer, which he later says he's doing so he can email Travis when he's away. Andy concocts a plan to make Ellie talk more about her son, Stan, but once she begins to talk, she can't stop. Opening sequence subtitle: Welcome to
27	3	"Makin' Some Noise"	John Putch	Sam Laybourne	October 6, 2010	7.10
Jules pays a lot of attention to Grayson; Travis asks Bobby for advice about how to behave at college; Ellie's new nanny suddenly becomes too friendly with her, and Laurie might have something to do with this. Opening sequence subtitle: Badly Titled
28	4	"The Damage You've Done"	John Putch	Chrissy Pietrosh & Jessica Goldstein	October 13, 2010	7.23
When Grayson tells Jules about him and Laurie sleeping together once in the past, Jules decides to take her anger out on Laurie. Laurie tells Smith she loves him, but his reaction isn't what she expects. Opening sequence subtitle: Not What The Show Is
29	5	"Keeping Me Alive"	Michael McDonald	Sanjay Shah	October 20, 2010	7.38
With his pride hurt, Bobby decides to stop receiving alimony from Jules. However, when she learns of the things he's been giving up, she decides to hire him to work with her. Laurie and Smith break up. Ellie believes that she's the smartest person in the gang. Opening sequence subtitle: 100% Cougar Free
30	6	"You Don't Know How It Feels"	Michael McDonald	Blake McCormick	October 27, 2010	8.16
Jules’ father, Chick (guest star Ken Jenkins), is in town for a Halloween visit. After Grayson learns that Chick loves Halloween, he invites Jules' father to a costume bash at his pub. When he leaves, Jules says that her father is great in a crowd, but she feels that he gets emotionally distant whenever it’s just the two of them alone. While there are only the two of them in Travis' old room, Jules tries to get Chick to spend a little quality time with her, but she clashes with him. Feeling guilty for being rude with her father, she decides to dress herself as a princess because she knows that her father loves costumes, and believes that this will make them bond. Believing that he won't show up at Grayson's pub, she becomes depressed, as does the man dressed as a bear behind her. When she leaves the pub, the man behind the bear costume reveals himself to be her father, Chick, who hugs her. He tells her that she reminds him of her mother, and both miss her. Ellie and Andy are trying to put Stan on the top of a list for a good preschool, and luckily for them, the headmaster of the preschool is someone Bobby plays golf with. Bobby says that he would be beyond happy in helping them, but Ellie had revoked his title as Stan’s emergency legal guardian after he and Jules got divorced. When she later learns that Bobby had called the headmaster the moment Ellie asked for the favor, she decides to reconsider her previous decision, now realizing that Bobby will do whatever it takes to help Stan. Meanwhile, Laurie tries to show Travis how good Halloween can be. At the costume bash in Grayson's pub, Grayson goes dressed as Prince (to Jules' princess); Ellie and Laurie dress as each other; Andy goes as Burt Reynolds; Bobby goes as Windy Guy; and Travis later shows up dressed as Andy. Opening sequence subtitle: Titles Are Hard
31	7	"Fooled Again (I Don't Like It)"	John Putch	Peter Saji & Melody Derloshon	November 3, 2010	7.43
Laurie teams up with Grayson to sabotage Ellie's entry in Jules' birthday gift contest. Andy suggests they go dancing on Jules' birthday, but when his idea is rejected, Jules instantly feels guilty and decides to bond with him. Travis shows Bobby how to use a Neti Pot, with all its consequences. Opening sequence subtitle: Modern
32	8	"Little Girl Blues"	Michael McDonald	Kate Purdy	November 17, 2010	7.05
Travis brings grad student Kirsten (Collette Wolfe) to meet Jules. Jules is unhappy when Ellie points out that any of Travis's girlfriends could end up being his future wife, like it happened with Jules and Bobby. Laurie becomes Jules' "Cobb-Stopper" to prevent Jules from taunting Kirsten, and also gives Kirsten some advice about how can she deal with Jules. Things take a turn for the worse after Kirsten says that she and Travis will spend Thanksgiving at her parents, and Jules freaks out. When Kirsten stands up against Jules, she accidentally breaks "Big Joe", Jules' favorite wine glass. Kirsten is mad that Travis isn't backing her. So Jules give him some advice about how to deal with his relationship, making amends with Kirsten as well. Grayson hates that his house is the new place for the gang to reunite. He goes after Ellie for advice, and decides to throw a stinking 'possum in his house, which makes the gang leave. Meanwhile, Travis is nervous about his second time with Kirsten because the first time he was too high due to medicine he had taken, and he takes advice from his father, Bobby, to help him out. Opening sequence subtitle: It's Okay To Watch A Show Called
33	9	"When the Time Comes"	Bruce Leddy	Mary Fitzgerald	November 24, 2010	6.62
Jules decides to host a romantic dinner at Thanksgiving to make Grayson say "I Love You" to her; Ellie and Laurie spoil Andy's optimism; the gang reveals that it's hard to understand what Bobby says most of the time, bringing him down. Guest Star: Scrubs regular Zach Braff appears twice as himself in a phone (as a phone application). Opening sequence subtitle: Regretfully, We Give You
34	10	"The Same Old You"	Michael McDonald	Ryan Koh	December 8, 2010	6.44
Jules tries to help Bobby regain his confidence; Ellie finds a hilarious secret of Grayson's; Kirsten is jealous of Travis and Laurie's relationship. Opening sequence subtitle: All I Want For Christmas Is A New Title
35	11	"No Reason to Cry"	Gail Mancuso	Gregg Mettler	January 5, 2011	6.57
Jules begins to question her relationship with Grayson; Kirsten throws Bobby off his golf game; Ellie is upset that Andy used their personal joke on Laurie. Opening sequence subtitle: New Year's Resolutions: Embrace Our Stupid Title & Lose Six Pounds [title] (We Love it!)
36	12	"A Thing About You"	Gail Mancuso	Mary Fitzgerald & Kate Purdy	January 19, 2011	5.68
When Laurie becomes Jules' house guest, she tells Jules that she doesn't have to change the way she is for the people around her; Bobby is jealous when Travis turns to Grayson for advice about romancing a woman. Opening sequence subtitle: Starting To Own It
37	13	"Lost Children"	Michael McDonald	Ryan Koh & Sam Laybourne	January 26, 2011	5.03
Jules comes up with a creative type of hide-and-seek game to play when the TV is broken; Bobby has a new friend. Opening sequence subtitle: Do We Have To Do This Joke Forever?
38	14	"Cry to Me"	Bruce Leddy	Melody Deloshon	February 2, 2011	6.51
On Valentine's Day, Jules wishes that Grayson would share his feelings with her; Andy "dates" Bobby; and Travis ask Laurie's help to buy a nice gift for Kirsten. Opening sequence subtitle: (See You Soon) [title] (Stay In Touch @VDoozer, @KBiegel or @CougarTownRoom)
39	15	"Walls"	Bill Lawrence	Sean Lavery	April 18, 2011	7.88
When Jules starts meddling in Travis' life, Ellie tells her to back off; Bobby and Laurie want to expose the world to their Penny Can game; Grayson learns about friendship from Andy. Opening sequence subtitle: We're Back! [title] (Hi Dance Fans, Please Still Be There...) Alternate subtitle: Welcome to (Note: This appeared in international broadcasts only)
40	16	"Baby's a Rock 'N' Roller"	Michael McDonald	Peter Saji	April 20, 2011	6.18
Jules tries to show Ellie having a baby was harder in her twenties; Andy becomes Laurie's wingman; Bobbie tries to wake up earlier. Opening sequence subtitle: Welcome To Cul-De-Sac Crew [crossed out], Cougar City [crossed out], Cougar Town (sticking with it)
41	17	"You're Gonna Get It"	Michael McDonald	Michael McDonald	April 27, 2011	5.62
Jules faces her fear of public humiliation when she decides to do some charity work; Laurie surprises everyone with her wits in a game of trivia. Opening sequence subtitle: Welcome to [title], (Follow @TheLarmy right now and thank us later) Alternate subtitle: Welcome to (Note: This appeared in international broadcasts only)
42	18	"Lonesome Sundown"	Bruce Leddy	Sanjay Shah & Blake McCormick	May 4, 2011	5.49
Grayson tries to take an interest in Travis, and the gang establishes a "council" to determine each other's punishment in an attempt to stop taking each other for granted. Opening sequence subtitle: Sorry, we still cringe at the title
43	19	"Damaged by Love"	Michael McDonald	Aaron Ho	May 11, 2011	6.02
Travis has a broken heart, and Jules and Bobby don't know what to do to help him. Andy's flirtatious sister-in-law (Nia Vardalos) visits. Opening sequence subtitle: We pretend to be called Wine Time
44	20	"Free Fallin'"	Michael McDonald	Gregg Mettler	May 18, 2011	5.23
When Jules learns that Travis has dropped out of college, she gives him two choices: either get back to college and she will pay his college expenses, or get out of her house. Bobby's Penny Can game gets picked up by a company, and he is offered a business deal. Opening sequence subtitle: We Should Have Live Cougars On
45	21	"Something Good Coming, Part 1"	Michael McDonald	Jessica Goldstein & Chrissy Pietrosh	May 25, 2011	5.01
The gang travels to Hawaii to bring Travis back home, but also uses it as a way to enjoy a vacation; Grayson wants to have kids, but Jules has a different opinion in that matter; Jules finally welcomes Tom to the gang. Guest stars: Danny Pudi makes a cameo in this episode as his character Abed from Community as a part of a "cameo crossover" made by the two shows. Also, Sam Lloyd reprises his character Ted Buckland from Scrubs. Opening sequence subtitle: We will never stop mocking the title... Alternate subtitle: The tabloids says the cast date each other on [title] ...but they don't. (Note: This appeared in international broadcasts of part 2 only)
46	22	"Something Good Coming, Part 2"	Bill Lawrence	Bill Lawrence & Kevin Biegel	May 25, 2011	5.01
The gang travels to Hawaii to bring Travis back home, but also uses it as a way to enjoy a vacation; Grayson wants to have kids, but Jules has a different opinion in that matter; Jules finally welcomes Tom to the gang. Guest stars: Sam Lloyd reprises his character Ted Buckland from Scrubs. Opening sequence subtitle: We will never stop mocking the title... Alternate subtitle: The tabloids says the cast date each other on [title] ...but they don't. (Note: This appeared in international broadcasts of part 2 only)

== Ratings ==
=== U.S. Nielsen ratings ===
Order	Episode	Rating	Share	Rating/share (18–49)	Viewers (millions)	Rank 18–49 (Timeslot)	Rank 18–49 (Night)	Note
1 (25)	"All Mixed Up"	5.1	8	3.4/9	8.32	2	5	
2 (26)	"Let Yourself Go"	4.5	7	2.8/8	6.97	3	6	
3 (27)	"Makin' Some Noise"	4.4	7	3.0/8	7.10	3	5	
4 (28)	"The Damage You've Done"	4.4	7	3.2/9	7.23	3	5	
5 (29)	"Keeping Me Alive"	4.6	7	3.1/8	7.49	2	4	
6 (30)	"You Don't Know How It Feels"	5.2	8	3.3/9	8.16	3	5	
7 (31)	"Fooled Again (I Don't Like It)"	4.6	7	3.0/8	7.43	2	4	
8 (32)	"Little Girl Blues"	4.3	7	3.0/8	7.05	2	4	
9 (33)	"When the Time Comes"	3.8	7	2.4/8	6.62	1	2	
10 (34)	"The Same Old You"	4.1	7	2.6/7	6.44	3	5	
11 (35)	"No Reason to Cry"	4.2	7	2.8/8	6.57	2	3	
12 (36)	"A Thing About You"	3.6	6	2.4/6	5.68	3	5	
13 (37)	"Lost Children"	3.2	5	2.0/5	5.03	3	5	
14 (38)	"Cry to Me"	3.9	6	2.7/7	6.51	2	4	
15 (39)	"Walls"	5.1	8	2.2/6	7.88	2	6	
16 (40)	"Baby's a Rock 'n' Roller"	3.7	6	2.3/6	6.18	2	5	
17 (41)	"You're Gonna Get It"	3.5	5	2.1/5	5.62	3	5	
18 (42)	"Lonesome Sundown"	3.6	6	2.2/6	5.49	3	7	
19 (43)	"Damaged by Love"	3.7	6	2.3/6	6.02	2	5	
20 (44)	"Free Fallin'"	3.2	5	2.0/5	5.23	2	6	
21/22 (45/46)	"Something Good Coming"	3.2	5	2.0/5	5.01	1	4	

=== Australian ratings ===
Over the 13 episodes that have aired they have averaged 0.295 million viewers or 295,461 viewers

Order	Episode	Original airdate	Timeslot	Viewers (millions)	Nightly rank	Weekly rank
1	"All Mixed Up"	1 February 2011	Tuesday 10:30 pm–11:00 pm	0.362	28	—N/a
2	"Let Yourself Go"	1 February 2011	Tuesday 11:00 pm–11:30 pm	0.193	42	—N/a
3	"Makin' Some Noise"	8 February 2011	Tuesday 10:30 pm–11:00 pm	0.314	29	—N/a
4	"The Damage You've Done"	8 February 2011	Tuesday 11:00 pm–11:30 pm	0.191	43	—N/a
5	"Keeping Me Alive"	15 February 2011	Tuesday 10:30 pm–11:00 pm	0.323	30	—N/a
6	"You Don't Know How It Feels"	1 March 2011	Tuesday 10:30 pm–11:00 pm	0.287	33	—N/a
7	"Fooled Again (I Don't Like It)"	8 March 2011	Tuesday 10:30 pm–11:00 pm	0.344	30	—N/a
8	"Little Girl Blues"	15 March 2011	Tuesday 10:30 pm–11:00 pm	0.286	34	—N/a
9	"When the Time Comes"	22 March 2011	Tuesday 10:30 pm–11:00 pm	0.310	32	—N/a
10	"The Same Old You"	29 March 2011	Tuesday 10:30 pm–11:00 pm	0.431	26	—N/a
11	"No Reason to Cry"	29 March 2011	Tuesday 11:00 pm–11:30 pm	0.265	38	—N/a
12	"A Thing About You"	5 April 2011	Tuesday 10:30 pm–11:00 pm	0.221	41	—N/a
13	"Lost Children"	12 April 2011	Tuesday 10:30 pm–11:00 pm	0.314	33	—N/a
14	"Cry to Me"	3 May 2011	Tuesday 11:00 pm–11:30 pm	0.238	41	—N/a
15	"Walls"	10 May 2011	Tuesday 10:30 pm–11:00 pm	0.263	39	—N/a
16	"Baby's a Rock 'N' Roller"	17 May 2011	Tuesday 10:30 pm–11:00 pm	0.296	37	—N/a
17	"You're Gonna Get It"	24 May 2011	Tuesday 10:30 pm–11:00 pm	0.309	35	TBA
18	"Lonesome Sundown"	31 May 2011	Tuesday 10:30 pm–11:00 pm	0.223	43	TBA
17	"Damaged By Love"	7 May 2011	Tuesday 10:30 pm–11:00 pm	0.246	40	TBA

=== New Zealand Ratings ===
All Sourced from:

Over the 13 episodes that have aired they have averaged 0.328 million viewers or 323,692 viewers

Episode Number	Episode Name	Airdate	Viewers (millions)	Rank(Timeslot)	Rank 18–49 (Night)
2-01	All Mixed Up	February 9, 2011	N/A	N/A	N/A
2–02	Let Yourself Go	February 16, 2011	0.334	2	8
2–03	Makin' Some Noise	February 23, 2011	0.328	2	5
2–04	The Damage You've Done	March 2, 2011	0.290	2	7
2–05	Keeping Me Alive	March 9, 2011	0.356	2	7
2–06	You Don't Know How It Feels	March 23, 2011	0.322	2	7
2–07	Fooled Again (I Don't Like It)	March 30, 2011	0.286	2	7
2–08	Little Girl Blues	April 6, 2011	0.306	2	7
2–09	When The Time Comes	April 13, 2011	0.301	2	7
2–10	The Same Old You	April 20, 2011	0.294	2	6
2–11	No Reason To Cry	April 27, 2011	0.413	2	6
2–12	A Thing About You	May 4, 2011	0.319	2	6
2–13	Lost Children	May 11, 2011	0.401	2	6
2–14	Cry To Me	May 18, 2011	TBA	TBA	TBA
2–15	Walls	May 25, 2011	TBA	TBA	TBA
2–16	Baby's a Rock 'n' Roller	June 8, 2011	TBA	TBA	TBA
2–17	You're Gonna Get It	June 15, 2011	TBA	TBA	TBA
2–18	Lonesome Sundown	June 22, 2011	TBA	TBA	TBA
2–19	Damaged By Love	June 29, 2011	TBA	TBA	TBA
2–20	Free Fallin'	July 6, 2011	TBA	TBA	TBA
2–21	Something Good's Coming	July 13, 2011	TBA	TBA	TBA
2–22	Something Good's Coming	July 20, 2011	TBA	TBA	TBA

== See also ==
- List of Cougar Town episodes
