= Cougar Town season 6 =

Cougar Town
- Season 6
- No. of episodes: 13

Release
- Original network: TBS
- Original release: January 6 – March 31, 2015

Season chronology
- ← Previous; Season 5

The sixth and final season of Cougar Town, an American sitcom that aired on TBS, began airing on January 6, 2015, and concluded on March 31, 2015. Season six regular cast members include Courteney Cox, Christa Miller, Busy Philipps, Dan Byrd, Ian Gomez, and Josh Hopkins. The sitcom was created by Bill Lawrence and Kevin Biegel.

== Production ==
The show was renewed for a sixth and final season on May 10, 2014, containing 13 episodes, which began airing on January 6, 2015. Production on the final season finished on December 14, 2014. Brian Van Holt, who portrays Bobby Cobb, was announced to be exiting the series at the beginning of the season. Busy Philipps directed the fifth episode, making her the fourth cast member to have directed an episode, after Courteney Cox, Brian Van Holt, and Josh Hopkins.

== Casting ==
It was announced on October 22, 2014, that the Australian pop star Cody Simpson is going to guest-star on the show, as a high school student who has a strong resemblance to Grayson. Cindy Crawford also had a cameo appearance as herself in the season's tenth episode.

== Episodes ==
No. overall	No. in season	Title	Directed by	Written by	Original release date	US viewers (millions)
90	1	"American Dream Plan B"	Courteney Cox	Blake McCormick	January 6, 2015	1.04
Laurie is eight months pregnant and completely annoyed with all that goes with it, especially the fact that she can't drink while watching all her friends sip their wine. Jules tells her friend they will all quit drinking until she has the baby, but it isn't long before the gang secretly sets up a speakeasy in Tom's garage. Elsewhere, Grayson tries to help a clumsy Travis prepare to handle a newborn, while Andy badly misses Bobby, who is competing in a golf tournament in Georgia. Opening sequence subtitle: Season 6! Is it too late to change the title?
91	2	"Full Grown Boy"	John Putch	Kevin Biegel	January 13, 2015	0.88
When Chick wants to go to his Civil War reenactment, Jules is reluctant to let him go because of his health issues. Laurie comes up with some highly original baby names, much to Travis and Ellie's dismay. Bobby considers leaving Gulfhaven for a club pro job in Georgia. Laurie's water breaks two weeks early, and she gives birth to a healthy boy. After Laurie hears that Travis and the gang hated all her baby names, Travis suggests the name Bobby. Opening sequence subtitle: We pity the fool who's missing this.
92	3	"To Find a Friend"	John Putch	Melody Derloshon	January 20, 2015	0.85
Jules and Ellie try to run the bar, after telling Grayson his job is easy. With a couple days off, Grayson holds "Bobby Cobb Replacement" auditions for a downtrodden Andy. Travis and Laurie spend their first weekend together with the baby and worry about every little thing. Opening sequence subtitle: Welcome to [title] There's a baby now. And it talks!
93	4	"Waiting for Tonight"	Michael McDonald	Brad Morris & Emily Wilson	January 27, 2015	1.04
Travis asks Jules to watch Baby Bobby, as Laurie is six weeks post-delivery and they can now "do it". At the same time, Grayson sets up a dinner date for some badly needed reconnect time with Jules, so Jules secretly asks Tom to watch Bobby. Meanwhile, Andy wants to do something impressive for Stan's birthday, so he dons a Buzz Lightyear suit. He then gets stuck in the suit and has to wear it to an important client meeting. Opening sequence subtitle: Welcome to [title] To infinity (or 102 episodes) and beyond!
94	5	"Even the Losers"	Busy Philipps	Sean Lavery	February 3, 2015	0.87
Andy is a wreck after losing his job, then finds out he has also been replaced as mayor of Gulfhaven. Ellie shows Andy a news article that suggests former mayor Roger Frank was behind everything, and the two plot their revenge. It turns out Ellie made up the story, but she is successful in getting Andy out of his funk. Travis uses a loan from Jules to start a dream business, which turns out to be a stupid idea. When Jules runs out of wine and doesn't want to go to the store for more, however, Travis comes up with a much better business idea. Elsewhere, Grayson takes over the elementary school music class that Andy had been running. Opening sequence subtitle: Welcome to [title] This one is pretty dope!
95	6	"The Wrong Thing to Do"	John Putch	Eric Ernst	February 10, 2015	0.91
Andy hasn't been to a job interview in 22 years, so Jules and Travis try to help him prepare. Ellie tries to get some alone time from Andy on Bobby's abandoned boat, but she finds that Grayson has already made it his own personal sanctuary. Meanwhile, Laurie encourages Tom to break his rule about dating his co-workers, but she may have unleashed a monster. Opening sequence subtitle: Welcome to [title] Crisp, rich humor with a strong emotional finish - Definitely a buy!
96	7	"The Wild One, Forever"	Josh Hopkins	Blake McCormick	February 17, 2015	1.32
When a hurricane floods the gym of the local high school, Jules volunteers Gray's Pub to host the prom, with the gang all serving as chaperones. As the event unfolds, the group is forced to relive their high school selves via the students. Opening sequence subtitle: Welcome to a magical night you'll remember forever, in... [title]
97	8	"This One's for Me"	Michael McDonald	Brad Morris & Emily Wilson	February 24, 2015	1.07
Gray's Pub closes down briefly due to a termite infestation. Ellie points out to Jules that Grayson leaves for three hours every morning and comes back happier, and Jules is horrified to discover her husband has joined a corny comedy troupe. Andy helps Travis learn the way to a happy marriage: let the wife win every argument, but privately sneak away for "secret treats". Meanwhile, Laurie drives Ellie crazy by constantly dressing herself and Baby Bobby in matching outfits. Opening sequence subtitle: Welcome to [title] Badly break for secret treats.
98	9	"Two Men Talking"	John Putch	Melody Derloshon	March 3, 2015	0.99
Jules tries to force Grayson and Chick to hang out together. After discovering Grayson lied about going fishing with Chick the next day, Jules is furious until Grayson proves it is Chick who wanted to break away from him to meet a female companion. Elsewhere, Andy tries to become part of a snooty group of female parents from the neighborhood, while Ellie and Travis find they can easily connect on an emotional level. Opening sequence subtitle: Welcome to shocking secrets, scandalous trysts, catfishing and more on this week's [title]
99	10	"Yer So Bad"	John Putch	Sean Lavery	March 10, 2015	1.22
Jules meets Diane, Chick's female companion, then later asks Chick if he would like to invite his girlfriend to dinner. The night spins out of control, however, when Chick brings a different woman to dinner. Travis plays detective to help Laurie track down a woman who stole her cupcake designs, but Laurie thinks it is a ruse that will end in a marriage proposal. Meanwhile, Andy and Ellie grill Tom when he hints that he is treating a celebrity patient at the hospital but refuses to reveal the name. Opening sequence subtitle: A chick filled episode of [title]
100	11	"Climb That Hill"	Courtney Rowe	Melody Derloshon	March 17, 2015	1.37
The gang tries to overcome some personal challenges. Jules tries to read a book all the way through, Grayson tries to be a better listener, and Andy tries to break his habit of putting his hand down his pants when he relaxes, after learning that Stan is doing it in school. Opening sequence subtitle: Welcome to THE 100th EPISODE OF - wait, seriously? A hundred? That can't be right. No, it is. Seriously. We checked. This is the 100th EPISODE OF [title]
101	12	"A Two Story Town"	John Putch	Sean Lavery & Brad Morris & Emily Wilson	March 24, 2015	1.21
Tom meets a woman named Mary in the hospital waiting room, after treating a relative of hers. He is smitten and wants to ask her for a date but is afraid his creepy side may come out, so his friends all pitch in to help him. Elsewhere, Grayson tries to up his #7 ranking on Jules' list of best kisses she's ever had, while Chick worries about the "Yoko Ono effect" when a member of his all-male jug band wants to bring in his girlfriend. Opening sequence subtitle: Welcome to [title] Always be sure to recycle.
102	13	"Mary Jane's Last Dance"	Courteney Cox	Bill Lawrence & Blake McCormick & Kevin Biegel	March 31, 2015	1.24
With Jules' birthday coming up, Grayson tries to keep her from calling all the shots and ruining things like she usually does. Trying to get Jules the perfect gift, he coaxes some information out of her and uses it to create a ruse where Travis/Laurie, Andy/Ellie, Tom/Mary and Chick come up with reasons that they have to move away. In the process, everyone says very nice things to Jules about what she has meant to each of them. This turns out to be Grayson's gift: for Jules to hear what others might say at her funeral. Laurie and Travis buy Grayson's old house. Bobby also appears on a video call. Opening sequence subtitle: Thank you for watching [Sunshine State] Finally got the new title!!

== Ratings ==
U.S. Nielsen ratings
Order	Episode	Rating (18–49)	Viewers (millions)	Cable rank (18–49)		Note
Order	Episode	Rating (18–49)	Viewers (millions)	Timeslot	Night	Note
1	"American Dream Plan B"	0.5	1.04	4	50	
2	"Full Grown Boy"	0.4	0.88	8	72	
3	"To Find a Friend"	0.4	0.85	13	94	
4	"Waiting for Tonight"	0.5	1.04	4	41	
5	"Even the Losers"	0.4	0.87	11	61	
6	"The Wrong Thing to Do"	0.4	0.91	11	71	
7	"The Wild One, Forever"	0.5	1.32	4	34	
8	"This One's for Me"	0.5	1.07	4	33	
9	"Two Men Talking"	0.4	0.99	7	52	
10	"Yer So Bad"	0.6	1.22	3	24	
11	"Climb That Hill"	0.6	1.37	4	22	
12	"A Two Story Town"	0.5	1.21	6	31	
13	"Mary Jane's Last Dance"	0.5	1.24	7	29	
