= Cougar Town season 4 =

Cougar Town
- Season 4
- DVD cover
- No. of episodes: 15

Release
- Original network: TBS
- Original release: January 8 – April 9, 2013

Season chronology
- ← Previous; Season 3 Next → Season 5

The fourth season of Cougar Town, an American sitcom that airs on TBS, began airing on January 8, 2013. Season four regular cast members include Courteney Cox, Christa Miller, Busy Philipps, Brian Van Holt, Dan Byrd, Ian Gomez, and Josh Hopkins. The sitcom was created by Bill Lawrence and Kevin Biegel. This is the first season to air on TBS.

== Production ==
On May 10, 2012, it was announced that Cougar Town would move from ABC to TBS, for its fourth season. The network also airs repeats of the ABC telecasts in a weekday post-midnight time slot. Bill Lawrence and Kevin Biegel have stepped down as showrunners, while Ric Swartzlander took over the role of showrunner during season four. However, Lawrence and Biegel remain as executive producers and consultants.

== Casting ==
It was announced in November 2012 that Shirley Jones will guest as Anne, one half of a couple that agrees to purchase Grayson's former house under the condition that they be welcomed into the Cul-de-Sac Crew. Tippi Hedren will guest star as herself in the season finale, as the group attempts to cheer up Jules' father by tracking down one of his favorite movie stars.

== Reception ==
The fourth season of Cougar Town received generally positive reviews from critics. The season currently holds an average score of 65 out of 100 on Metacritic, based on 7 reviews, indicating 'generally favorable reviews'.

== Episodes ==
No. overall	No. in season	Title	Directed by	Written by	Original release date	US viewers (millions)
62	1	"Blue Sunday"	Courteney Cox	Bill Lawrence	January 8, 2013	2.18
Jules and Grayson are in their first week of marriage, but it's not all wedded bliss for the latter, who has a lot to learn about being Jules' husband. Meanwhile, Bobby tries giving fatherly advice to Travis after he turns 21, and Ellie and Laurie console a depressed Jules when Grayson won't apologize for what he did in her dream. Opening sequence subtitle: Welcome back to [title] Thanks, TBS. Can we curse on TV now? Note: This is the first episode to air on TBS.
63	2	"I Need to Know"	Courteney Cox	Chrissy Pietrosh & Jessica Goldstein	January 15, 2013	2.02
Jules excuses Travis from "family night", but is worried by his extended absence. Meanwhile, Ellie finds success in training Andy like a dog, and the guys try to grow mustaches like Tom Selleck. Opening sequence subtitle: The letters in...[title] can be rearranged to spell "Taco Rug Now" (which also makes no sense).
64	3	"Between Two Worlds"	John Putch	Kevin Biegel	January 22, 2013	2.04
Jules frets about a lack of passion in her marriage to Grayson, but input from Ellie makes their relationship almost too hot to handle. Meanwhile, Laurie helps Travis locate his inner hero, and Bobby tries out a new personality. Opening sequence subtitle: I got hired on [title] and they only let me write these. My name's Donny. Hi, Mom.
65	4	"I Should Have Known It"	Michael McDonald	Melody Derloshon	January 29, 2013	2.06
When Tom gets a new girlfriend (Ali Wentworth), Jules and Laurie suspect she is a golddigger and decide to investigate. Bobby goes on a fake date with Ellie to improve his table manners, and after getting fed up with the girls' rules, Andy and Grayson rebel. Opening sequence subtitle: Donny made the title cards about him, so he's gone now.
66	5	"Runnin' Down A Dream"	John Putch	Justin Halpern & Patrick Schumacker	February 5, 2013	2.10
Jules decides that her heart is no longer in the real estate business. Meanwhile, Bobby discovers his dream job selling premade burgers from a truck. Unfortunately, Bobby's Burger Truck proves the perfect opportunity for Ellie to be rude to strangers. Laurie and Travis act like "art snobs" until Andy puts them in their place. Opening sequence subtitle: It's Donny again. I'm writing these again whether they want me to or not. There's blood everywhere.
67	6	"Restless"	Courteney Cox	Austen Faggen	February 12, 2013	2.43
Jules can't find a remedy for her insomnia. Grayson gets injured in a roller hockey game. Ellie makes herself scarce when Andy is feeling especially amorous around Valentine's Day and wants to cash in a large number of "sex coupons" she had given him in the past. Opening sequence subtitle: Happy Valentine's Day. Yeah, it's a fake holiday, but we still want stuff. xoxo The female writers P.S. Not lingerie-that's for you.
68	7	"Flirting With Time"	Courteney Cox	Blake McCormick	February 19, 2013	2.18
With Grayson's house on the market, the cul-de-sac crew waste little time judging their potential neighbors, which conjures up memories of the time when Jules and Bobby moved in. Meanwhile, Wade returns from Afghanistan earlier than expected, stirring mixed emotions in Laurie when he becomes too clingy. Opening sequence subtitle: This one's for you, continuity nerds.
69	8	"You and I Will Meet Again"	John Putch	Peter Saji	February 26, 2013	1.93
Laurie and Wade decide to move in together, but breaking the news to Travis doesn't go as planned. Tom becomes Jules' personal cheerleader after losing his "new guy" status. Jules and Grayson have a naked day that turns out to be anything but sexy. Opening sequence subtitle: Courteney Cox's boobs at 6:33
70	9	"Make It Better"	Courteney Cox	Rachel Specter & Audrey Wauchope	March 5, 2013	1.71
Jules' dad, Chick, spends some time at her house while recovering from an injury. During his stay, Jules experiences extreme pain from a kidney stone, but she's too stubborn to let her dad know. Bobby and Grayson attempt to teach Travis how to be a "playa." This appears to put off Laurie, who calls one of Travis' targets a "skank" while Wade is with her. Wade concludes that Laurie is too hung up on Travis to continue their relationship. Opening sequence subtitle: Asking the tough questions about sex robots.
71	10	"You Tell Me"	Michael McDonald	Brad Morris & Emily Wilson	March 12, 2013	1.60
Confused by her mixed feelings for Travis, Laurie resorts to destroying things, but when her anger gets out of control, newly appointed mayor Andy has to step in. Jules starts hanging out with her therapist after discovering that her friends have been keeping secrets, and Bobby has a fling with the girl of his dreams (Gillian Vigman) while enjoying a vacation at Target with Travis. Opening sequence subtitle: This episode was written by the absolute worst writers we have on staff (www.tbs.com/bradandemily)
72	11	"Saving Grace"	Michael McDonald	Blake McCormick	March 19, 2013	1.87
Jules is disappointed by Grayson's lack of faith; Grayson signs up the gang for a dodgeball game; Travis and Andy try to set up Bobby on a date with his new friend; and Ellie is worried that Andy doesn't find her attractive anymore. Opening sequence subtitle: This episode is funnier if you know that Courteney is terrified of birds.
73	12	"This Old Town"	John Putch	Melody Derloshon	March 26, 2013	1.75
An elderly couple, Ann and Norman McCormack, buy Grayson's old house after Jules promises them that they will all spend time together. Forced to hang out with the McCormacks, Ellie, Jules and Grayson soon discover that there are many perks to being old. Meanwhile, when another one of Bobby's get-rich-quick schemes doesn't pan out, he tries to switch up his luck by renaming his boat, and Travis searches for the perfect partner to win a high-stakes penny can game. Opening sequence subtitle: Call your mom, tell her you love her. We're trying to do something positive with these.
74	13	"The Criminal Kind"	Randall Keenan Winston	Sean Lavery	April 2, 2013	1.94
Inspired by The Breakfast Club, the Cul-De-Sac Crew offers insight into their innermost thoughts through voice-overs. Grayson is crushed after discovering some harsh reviews of Gray's Pub on Yelp, most of which target him personally. Jules goes to extreme lengths to prove she's not a goody-two-shoes, ultimately landing herself and her "accomplices" in grocery store jail. Laurie finally tells Travis that she "really likes" him. Opening sequence subtitle: John Hughes is a God.
75	14	"Don't Fade on Me"	John Putch	Melody Derloshon & Blake McCormick	April 9, 2013	1.81
Chick comes to house-sit while the gang goes on vacation. But when Jules discovers that her father hasn't been to the doctor in years, she insists on taking him. Laurie and Travis go on their first date together as a couple, and both admit that it feels awkward. Bobby is crushed to discover that Dog Travis is just using him for food. Opening sequence subtitle: Remember when we wanted to change the title? Ah, good times. Thanks for sticking with us.
76	15	"Have Love Will Travel"	John Putch	Mary Fitzgerald & Peter Saji	April 9, 2013	1.38
After discovering that Chick has health issues, the gang decides to forgo their planned vacation in The Bahamas and take him to Hollywood instead. The gang try to set up an evening in order for Chick to spend some quality time with one of his favorite stars, Tippi Hedren. Meanwhile, Laurie and Travis try carefully to set up the perfect first kiss, and Andy is upset to discover that no one recognizes him as Latino. Episode features guest appearances by Tippi Hedren as herself, an uncredited Lou Diamond Phillips as himself, a cameo from Gary “Baba Booey” Dell’Abate, regular television and film musician/composer Joshua Radin as a one-man band in his first acting role. Opening sequence subtitle: Hi Howard Stern Fans. Bababooey

== Ratings ==
=== U.S. Nielsen ratings ===
Order	Episode	Rating (18–49)	Viewers (millions)	Cable Rank 18–49 (Timeslot)	Cable Rank 18–49 (Night)	Note
1 (62)	"Blue Sunday"	1.1	2.18	3	13	
2 (63)	"I Need to Know"	1.0	2.02	2	13	
3 (64)	"Between Two Worlds"	0.9	2.04	4	14	
4 (65)	"I Should Have Known It"	0.9	2.06	3	12	
5 (66)	"Runnin' Down A Dream"	1.1	2.10	3	10	
6 (67)	"Restless"	1.1	2.43	2	9	
7 (68)	"Flirting With Time"	1.1	2.18	2	10	
8 (69)	"You and I Will Meet Again"	0.9	1.93	4	14	
9 (70)	"Make It Better"	0.8	1.71	4	17	
10 (71)	"You Tell Me"	0.8	1.60	5	16	
11 (72)	"Saving Grace"	0.9	1.87	4	10	
12 (73)	"This Old Town"	0.8	1.75	7	25	
13 (74)	"The Criminal Kind"	1.0	1.94	3	14	
14 (75)	"Don't Fade on Me"	0.8	1.81	5	16	
15 (76)	"Have Love Will Travel"	0.6	1.38	4	30	
