= Cougar Town season 3 =

Cougar Town
- Season 3
- DVD cover
- No. of episodes: 15

Release
- Original network: ABC
- Original release: February 14 – May 29, 2012

Season chronology
- ← Previous; Season 2 Next → Season 4

The third season of Cougar Town, an American sitcom that airs on ABC, began airing on February 14, 2012 and concluded on May 29, 2012 with a 1-hour episode. Season three regular cast members include Courteney Cox, Christa Miller, Busy Philipps, Brian Van Holt, Dan Byrd, Ian Gomez, and Josh Hopkins. The sitcom was created by Bill Lawrence and Kevin Biegel. This is the final season to air on ABC before it moved to TBS.

== Production ==
On January 10, 2011 ABC renewed Cougar Town for a third season, which was set to premiere sometime in midseason. In November 2011, ABC announced Cougar Town's third season would be cut from 22 episodes to 15. On January 17, 2012, ABC announced the series would return on Tuesday, February 14 at 8:30pm/7:30c, following Tim Allen's Last Man Standing.

The producers had been promoting the show by having the cast making cameos in other ABC shows, like Castle, Grey's Anatomy, Body of Proof, The Middle, Happy Endings, and Private Practice. On January 9, 2012 Michael Ausiello, from TVLine, reported that the season finale would focus on Jules and Grayson's wedding day.

== Casting ==
On September 9, 2011 it was reported that Sarah Chalke, who previously worked with the show's creators in Scrubs, would have a major arc as a photography professor at Travis' college and love interest for Bobby. On October 26, 2011, it was reported that other actors from Scrubs, Zach Braff and Robert Maschio, would also guest star in the show, while Sam Lloyd and Ken Jenkins would be reprising their roles from the previous season. On December 19, 2011 it was reported that Edwin Hodge was cast as a love interest for Laurie, a military man whom Laurie dates through Skype. On January 27, 2012 it was announced that Courteney Cox's ex-husband and executive producer of the series David Arquette would guest star in the season finale as a helpful hotel concierge. This would mark the 6th collaboration between Cox and Arquette, as they both starred in the 1996 horror flick Scream and its three sequels and Arquette guest starred in the third season of Friends.

== Reception ==
The third season of Cougar Town received generally favorable reviews from critics. The season currently holds an average score of 80 out of 100 on Metacritic, based on 5 reviews, indicating 'generally favorable reviews'.

== Episodes ==
No. overall	No. in season	Title	Directed by	Written by	Original release date	US viewers (millions)
47	1	"Ain’t Love Strange"	Bill Lawrence	Bill Lawrence	February 14, 2012	4.88
Jules gets mad when Grayson says she is predictable, and when her car is covered with toilet paper and made to look like a shark by a group of teenagers, she decides to prove him wrong by toilet papering their home. Grayson, however, anticipating her actions, uses the opportunity to play his own prank on her, with the intention of proposing to her. Meanwhile, Ellie worries about Stan's behavior after a series of destructive streaks. Opening sequence subtitle: Yeah. It's still called [title] We're not happy about it either.
48	2	"A Mind With a Heart of Its Own"	John Putch	Chrissy Pietrosh & Jessica Goldstein	February 21, 2012	4.49
To avoid hurting anyone's feelings, Jules asks Laurie and Ellie to be her co-maids of honor. Chick (Ken Jenkins) decides to have a little fun when Grayson asks him for Jules' hand in marriage. To show he's okay with their marriage, Bobby installs a zip-line from Grayson's house to Jules'. Opening sequence subtitle: Titles we liked better than [title]: Sunshine State, The Drinking Age, Cougar City, Mid-Life.
49	3	"Lover's Touch"	Michael McDonald	Michael McDonald	February 28, 2012	4.30
Jules spends all her time on wedding plans until an accident lands Travis in the hospital. While there, the group discovers for the first time that neighbor Tom (Bob Clendenin) is a neurosurgeon. Meanwhile, a new game turns dangerous. Opening sequence subtitle: This is not the Simpson's chalkboard bit (3x).
50	4	"Full Moon Fever"	Courteney Cox	Sanjay Shah	March 6, 2012	4.33
Bobby falls for Travis' photography teacher, Angie (guest star Sarah Chalke); Laurie begins a new relationship with a soldier through Twitter; a gang of kids is terrorizing the cul-de-sac. Opening sequence subtitle: Your name isn't that great either. Note: This episode marks Courteney Cox's directing debut.
51	5	"A One Story Town"	Bill Lawrence	Kevin Biegel	March 13, 2012	4.17
The gang sets up the perfect date to help Bobby in romancing Angie. Meanwhile, it's the annual Crab festival in Gulfhaven, filling the town to the brim with Quebecers. Opening sequence subtitle: No, it's not just Scrubs in Florida with a lot of wine. Note: The final scene of the episode serves as a mini-reunion for Scrubs. The scene features Scrubs cast members Ken Jenkins, Robert Maschio, Zach Braff, Christa Miller, Bob Clendenin, Sarah Chalke, and Sam Lloyd and his Worthless Peons.
52	6	"Something Big"	Michael McDonald	Gregg Mettler	March 20, 2012	4.38
Grayson runs into an old flame and discovers he's the father of her child; Bobby teaches Ellie how to surf; Laurie tries to spend some quality time with Travis. Opening sequence subtitle: You know what would be cooler than this title card bit? A new title.
53	7	"You Can Still Change Your Mind"	John Putch	Blake McCormick	April 10, 2012	4.81
Bobby plans to take his relationship with Angie (Sarah Chalke) to the next level but ends it when he discovers that she is still dating other men. Travis wants to be the photographer for Jules and Grayson's wedding. Grayson discovers items from the past in Jules' kitchen drawer that he pries open. Ellie uses a Simon game to taunt "Jelly Bean" (Laurie) about her intellectual shortcomings. Opening sequence subtitle: Seriously, we spend more time coming up with these title cards than we do writing the show.
54	8	"Ways to Be Wicked"	Bruce Leddy	Sam Laybourne	April 17, 2012	4.45
Ellie receives a visit from her mother (Susan Blakely), whom she claims to be a sociopath; Grayson tries to help Laurie with her cake business; Bobby and Chick help Travis and his friends to come up with a plan to steal the college's cougar statue. Opening sequence subtitle: Pay attention. The title [title] almost makes sense this week!
55	9	"Money Becomes King"	Michael McDonald	Ryan Koh	April 24, 2012	4.89
Jules and Grayson must make some sacrifices for paying their wedding; Laurie's new business does well, which forces her to make some serious decisions. Opening sequence subtitle: She's marrying a man her own age, so why is it called [title].
56	10	"Southern Accents"	Bruce Leddy	Kate Purdy	May 1, 2012	4.77
Jules' struggle in accepting Holly becomes worse after she discovers that Holly and Travis made-out; Andy wants to run a campaign to be the city's mayor in order to change a law that will let Jules and Grayson have their wedding on the beach; and Laurie tries to convince Bobby that he's socially inept after an awkward moment in her cake business. Opening sequence subtitle: Hey, would you and your friends watch a show called "Pig Trials"? Watch the episode, get back to us #pigtrials.
57	11	"Down South"	John Putch	Mary Fitzgerald	May 8, 2012	4.63
When a hurricane strikes in town, Jules throws a "hurricane party"; Travis wants to make a play for Laurie after learning that she recently broke up with her soldier boyfriend. Opening sequence subtitle: "I didn't know it was back on either." -Abed
58	12	"Square One"	Courteney Cox	Peter Saji	May 15, 2012	3.31
Jules and Grayson are afraid to make the same mistakes of their past relationships; Ellie and Laurie fight over who's the sexiest between them; Bobby enters a "white shirt challenge" with Jules. Opening sequence subtitle: "Welcome to Cougarton Abbey" (reference to Community’s 3rd season episode "Biology 101", which showed Cougar Town was adapted from a fictional British show, "Cougarton Abbey").
59	13	"It'll All Work Out"	John Putch	Melody Derloshon	May 15, 2012	3.22
Jules begins to questions Ellie's parenting skills; Grayson helps Andy practice for the annual party of candidates running for mayor; Bobby and Laurie help a struggling Travis in writing Jules' wedding vows. Opening sequence subtitle: "Are we still on TV?"
60	14	"My Life"	John Putch	Kevin Biegel	May 29, 2012	3.42
In the first part, anger over losing his privacy causes Grayson to tell Laurie that Jules only invited her to be her co-bridesmaid out of pity. As a punishment for Jules, the gang begins to repeat the same day over and over again until Jules apologizes. Bobby, Andy and Travis struggle to recapture the fun of "Penny Can". Still six months away from the big wedding planned, Grayson asks to Jules to "run away" with him and get married in Napa Valley. Opening sequence subtitle: "Hopefully this is only the season finale." Alternate subtitle: "No title card joke this week - sorry" (DVD and international broadcasts only, the original hour-long broadcast used episode fifteen's subtitle)
61	15	"Your World"	John Putch	Bill Lawrence	May 29, 2012	3.42
In the second part, Ellie finds herself attracted to a helpful Napa hotel concierge named Daniel (David Arquette), which makes Andy jealous. Travis is forced to deal with his feelings for Laurie when her army boyfriend Wade shows up at the wedding. Jules calls off the wedding because Grayson's daughter can't be there. Back in Florida, Jules and Grayson have a quick wedding on the beach with her father, Chick, serving as the minister. As the beach wedding is in violation of local ordinance, the police arrive to stop it (with one of the officers being played by the show's co-creator and executive producer Bill Lawrence). The gang keeps moving the wedding farther down the beach, until Jules and Grayson are able to ride off on Chick's horse as a happily married couple. Opening sequence subtitle: "Hopefully this is only the season finale." (DVD and international broadcasts only, the original hour-long broadcast eliminated the second opening sequence) Note: This is the final episode of Cougar Town to air on ABC.

== Ratings ==
=== U.S. Nielsen ratings ===
Order	Episode	Rating	Share	Rating/share (18–49)	Viewers (millions)	Rank 18–49 (Timeslot)	Rank 18–49 (Night)	Note
1 (47)	"Ain't Love Strange"	3.3	5	1.8/5	4.88	4	9	
2 (48)	"A Mind with a Heart of Its Own"	2.9	4	1.7/4	4.49	4	9	
3 (49)	"Lover's Touch"	2.7	4	1.6/4	4.30	4	6	
4 (50)	"Fool Moon Fever"	2.8	4	1.5/4	4.33	4	8	
5 (51)	"A One Story Town"	2.8	5	1.4/4	4.17	3	8	
6 (52)	"Something Big"	3.0	5	1.6/5	4.38	3	8	
7 (53)	"You Can Still Change Your Mind"	3.3	5	1.5/4	4.81	4	13	
8 (54)	"Ways to be Wicked"	3.0	5	1.4/4	4.45	4	13	
9 (55)	"Money Becomes King"	3.3	5	1.5/4	4.89	4	9	
10 (56)	"Southern Accents"	3.3	5	1.3/4	4.77	4	13	
11 (57)	"Down South"	3.1	5	1.5/4	4.63	3	9	
12 (58)	"Square One"	2.3	4	1.0/3	3.31	4	9	
13 (59)	"It'll All Work Out"	2.3	4	1.0/3	3.22	4	9	
14/15 (60/61)	"My Life/Your World"	2.3	4	1.2/4	3.42	3	7	
