= Cougar Town season 1 =

Cougar Town
- Season 1
- DVD cover
- No. of episodes: 24

Release
- Original network: ABC
- Original release: September 23, 2009 – May 19, 2010

Season chronology
- Next → Season 2

The first season of Cougar Town, an American television series, began airing on September 23, 2009, and concluded on May 19, 2010, after Modern Family and before Eastwick. Season one regular cast members include Courteney Cox, Christa Miller, Busy Philipps, Brian Van Holt, Dan Byrd, Ian Gomez, and Josh Hopkins. The sitcom was created by Bill Lawrence and Kevin Biegel.

The series began production on April 29, 2009. It was originally supposed to air on Tuesdays, but postponed to Wednesday nights.

== Conception ==
Following the cancellation of Dirt, Courteney Cox wanted to return to broadcast television and do another comedy. Lawrence, who is best known as the creator of Scrubs and Spin City, was approached by Cox about "wanting to do something." While developing the concept of the show, Lawrence thought he would do a tryout with Cox on Scrubs, by guest-starring in the first three episodes of the eighth season. He wanted to see what it was like to work together (who thought that she was an easy and fun person to work with) and decided to go from there. Lawrence and Biegel, who worked together writing episode on Scrubs, came up with the concept of the show with Cox as a 40-year-old, newly single woman because he thought that it was a real "zeitgeist-y topic." He drew inspiration from his real-life wife, actress Christa Miller who also stars in the show as Ellie; Miller had previously worked with Cox as part of the story-arc of the three part Scrubs try-out. Lawrence told Cox that the show could be "high-risk, high-reward," although Cox decided to go for it. He added, "I rarely have this much trepidation because usually the only person I could let down is myself. I want to make it work for her." In addition, Lawrence was also a staff writer on Friends during the show's first season.

Before he pitched the idea to ABC, other titles for the show included 40 and Single and The Courteney Cox Show, which was eventually named Cougar Town because Lawrence thought that "the title is noisy and that people will be aware of this show." He felt that the risk of the title was that the audience wouldn't watch it because people would say "...the title bums me," commenting: "it's a risky roll of the dice ... We don't call women "cougars" in it. We certainly don't use the word beyond the unbelievably big cheat that the high school mascot is a cougar." Lawrence believed that with the subsequent scripts they'd be doing and the re-shoots in the pilot, the show would be "creatively satisfying." After he pitched the idea to ABC, they asked him to have a pilot ready to shoot by the end of January 2009. Lawrence and Biegel together wrote the script with Lawrence, who has written and directed many episodes on Scrubs, directing the episode. In casting beyond Cox, Lawrence created the character of Ellie for his wife, Christa Miller. Miller felt that her character started off "gleefully" and that her husband would write down little things that she would say, in which she believes is the reason her character "came out of that."

== Crew ==
In addition to having created the series, Bill Lawrence is the show runner, head writer, and the executive producer. Courteney Cox, who also stars on the show, serves as executive producer alongside Lawrence. Lawrence, the executive producer, show runner, head writer and creator of Scrubs, co-wrote and directed the pilot and wrote the second episode. He has written for other shows that include, Friends, The Nanny, and Boy Meets World as well as co-created Spin City. Kevin Biegel, co-creator, has also written episode for Scrubs. He wrote 7 episodes on Scrubs and wrote the pilot script with Lawrence.

== Filming ==
The series takes place at the fictional town of Gulf Haven in Sarasota County, Florida although it is filmed at Culver Studios in Culver City, California. The pilot episode was directed and written by Scrubs creator Bill Lawrence, who is married to Scrubs and Cougar Town star Christa Miller. Lawrence serves as executive producer/writer/director, Kevin Biegel as writer/co-executive producer, and Courteney Cox and David Arquette are executive producers. It is produced by Doozer Productions and Coquette Productions (headed by Cox and her husband David Arquette) and is from ABC Studios. The sitcom is filmed in the single-camera format. Cox filmed the pilot on March 19, 2009.

== Reception ==
In the USA the audience dropped from 11 million to 6 million over the 14-episode run. In Australia the audience dropped from 1.3 to 1 million in one week after the chief executive of the Australian channel showing it (Seven Network) described it as a 'shit show' that he could get large audiences for, by promoting it. In late April 2010, Cougar Town was canned in Australia due to poor ratings; 10 episodes had been run. Recently, Channel 7 returned both Cougar Town and How I Met Your Mother to its schedule from June 17. Cougar Town aired after a repeat of How I Met Your Mother, managing just 433,000 viewers. They plan to continue showing it in double episodes until the end of Season 1. In late January 2011, Seven Network returned the show to a late timeslot of 10:30 Tuesday nights after a New Episode of Parenthood. In the UK, the first season aired on LIVING, and was shown in double-bills on Tuesday nights at 9pm. The season premiered on March 30, 2010, to a strong 802,000 viewers and concluded on June 15, 2010, to a series low of 593,000 viewers. However, the entire season was the most-watched show on LIVING, averaging 769,000 viewers.

== Episodes ==
No. overall	No. in season	Title	Directed by	Written by	Original release date	US viewers (millions)
1	1	"Pilot"	Bill Lawrence	Kevin Biegel & Bill Lawrence	September 23, 2009	11.28
Jules is a woman in her forties who is five months out of her marriage and is being pressured by her best friends into getting "back out there" though she finds the dating scene to not be her style. But with a teenage son who would be happier if she were to hide out in the house, she tells him that she feels like she's "allowed to have a life." Now in her forties, she finds herself eager to live the dating scene that she missed. Laurie is Jules' younger co-worker, who wants to show her how to go out and have fun. Ellie is Jules' sarcastic neighbor, married and content to her average but lovable husband Andy. There's also Jules' family, her ex-husband Bobby and her son Travis, who will test her patience, and her new fortysomething divorced neighbor Grayson, who doesn't believe that Jules can date again.
2	2	"Into the Great Wide Open"	Chris Koch	Bill Lawrence	September 30, 2009	9.25
Jules tries to party hard like a twenty something and ends up looking like a total fool, when even her best friend Ellie, told her not to do it.
3	3	"Don't Do Me Like That"	Gail Mancuso	Kevin Biegel	October 7, 2009	7.84
Jules' family and friends crash the 10th date with her new boyfriend, Josh. Ellie and Laurie help Jules realize that it's ok to be selfish once in a while, when Jules has a disastrous experience in bed with Josh. Meanwhile, Jules left Travis with his dad Bobby, who has to be responsible and deal with his son.
4	4	"I Won't Back Down"	Michael Spiller	Chrissy Peitroch & Jessica Goldstein	October 14, 2009	8.00
Jules accidentally tells Grayson he's hot and tries to get him to admit she is sexy too. Although, she gets upset that Grayson doesn't think she's attractive. Bobby and Travis try to find common ground, while Ellie is upset that being a mother has changed what guys think of her. After embarrassing herself in front of Grayson, Jules tries to get back at him and uncovers Grayson's weakness who revealed that he wanted to have kids but his wife didn't want to have children with him.
5	5	"You Wreck Me"	Jamie Babbit	Linda Videtti Figueiredo	October 21, 2009	7.31
After Bobby's golf record is smashed, he feels like a broken man. Meanwhile, after Travis finds out about Jules and Josh's relationship, Josh urges Jules to perform their first public kiss. Although he regrets it after Jules dismisses his kissing technique.
6	6	"A Woman in Love (It's Not Me)"	Ken Whittingham	Ryan Koh	October 28, 2009	7.54
When Josh tells Jules he's in love with her, she knows the time has come to break things off with him. Unfortunately for Jules, she's not the best at ending relationships without hurting people's feelings, but she has the expertise of friends Laurie and Ellie to see her through. Meanwhile, Bobby, Grayson and Andy hit the links with money and pride on the line.
7	7	"Don't Come Around Here No More"	Sanjay Shah	Sanjay Shah	November 4, 2009	6.87
Jules always seems to be with her friends, her ex or her son. One night when everyone is busy, she reluctantly takes a date with an older man just to get out of the house, so Grayson makes her a wager that she can't spend a whole day by herself.
8	8	"Two Gunslingers"	Phil Traill	Mary Fitzpatrick	November 18, 2009	7.92
Jules convinces Ellie and Laurie to go away with her for a wild weekend. Meanwhile, Grayson watches over Travis, while Jules is away. Note: Brian Van Holt is absent in this episode.
9	9	"Here Comes My Girl"	Lee Shallat-Chemel	Sam Laybourne	November 25, 2009	5.54
Jules' plan for a romantic dinner for two backfires for Thanksgiving. Travis shows off his girlfriend Kylie to everyone. Jules gives Travis and Kylie advice on birth control. Bobby and Grayson bond over a common interest.
10	10	"Mystery Man"	John Putch	Teleplay by : Christine Pietrosh & Jessica Goldstein; Story by : Kevin Biegel	December 9, 2009	7.01
A wealthy man, Jeff (Scott Foley) has an ulterior motive in his search for an expensive home; Ellie tests her trust of Andy by leaving their baby with him for a day.
11	11	"Rhino Skin"	Millicent Shelton	Kate Purdy	January 6, 2010	7.88
Despite fearing the meanest and most unrelenting dermatologist in town, Dr. Amy Evans (Lisa Kudrow), Jules and Ellie are willing to endure the harsh ridicule and wrath for an appointment with the best in the business. But when Jules learns Dr. Evans is seeing Bobby, she's determined to stand up to her and protect him. Meanwhile, Travis gets advice from Andy about women.
12	12	"Scare Easy"	Chris Koch	Kevin Biegel	January 13, 2010	7.27
Jules freaks out when things heat up with her boyfriend, Jeff. Meanwhile, Laurie seeks diversion sex with an unsuspecting friend and Andy spills the beans about his big secret.
13	13	"Stop Dragging My Heart Around"	Michael McDonald	Mara Brock Akil	January 20, 2010	7.54
In the aftermath of her breakup with Jeff, Jules turns to Bobby for some solace. Meanwhile, Laurie discovers a common thread between Jules and Grayson, and Travis' plans for a night with girlfriend Kylie don't go exactly as planned. Note: During the scene when Travis seeks Jules for comfort, an episode of Scrubs, also created by Bill Lawrence, is shown on the TV screen in the living room.
14	14	"All the Wrong Reasons"	Michael Spiller	Peter Saji	February 3, 2010	6.26
A hot tennis instructor gets between Ellie and Jules, Laurie turns to Travis to be her conscience, and Andy and Grayson try to comfort Bobby who is nursing a fresh heartbreak over his ex-wife.
15	15	"When a Kid Goes Bad"	Michael McDonald	Linda Videtti Figueiredo	February 10, 2010	6.41
When everyone else makes plans for Valentine's Day, Jules looks to Grayson for company, only to learn he hates the holiday. Meanwhile, Bobby and Jules are at an impasse over letting Travis go to a party, Ellie is determined to triumph as alpha dog over Grayson, and Laurie meets Smith's dad.
16	16	"What Are You Doin' in My Life?"	Gail Mancuso	Jessica Goldstein & Chrissy Pietrosh	March 3, 2010	5.35
Laurie needs a co-signer to buy her first condo and finds her less than stellar, absentee mother (guest starring Beverly D'Angelo as Sheila) no help at all. Meanwhile, Bobby is mugged by a woman and Travis comes to Barb's aid after her latest cosmetic surgery procedure.
17	17	"Counting on You"	Gail Mancuso	Melody Derloshon	March 10, 2010	6.10
Jules is determined to prove to Grayson that women and men can be friends without any sexual undertones. Meanwhile, with Jules' encouragement, Andy buys a motorcycle from Laurie – to Ellie's dismay – and Travis joins Bobby on a man-trip for some "noodling," only to be mortified by his discovery of what noodling actually is.
18	18	"Turn This Car Around"	John Putch	Kate Purdy	March 24, 2010	6.28
Sara (Sheryl Crow) is a confident wine rep who sets her sights on Grayson, but is he strong enough to be her man? Meanwhile, when Ellie tells Jules she can't change past a certain age, Jules is determined to prove her wrong by giving up wine for a month; and Bobby's new dog poses some unwanted competition for Andy.
19	19	"Everything Man"	Michael McDonald	Sam Laybourne	March 31, 2010	6.01
Jules and Sara hit it off, but when Grayson is overly attentive to his new girl, Jules warns him to back off before Sara pulls away. Meanwhile, Jules' perfect new bathroom - complete with a "talking toilet" - becomes the main attraction in her home; and Grayson finds inspiration for a new song with a little help from Sara. Note: Unlike every other episode of the series which are named after Tom Petty songs, this episode is named after a song sung by Grayson and his girlfriend Sara (Sheryl Crow) during the episode.
20	20	"Wake Up Time"	John Putch	Michael McDonald	April 14, 2010	5.80
Jules is thrilled for the chance to take care of Travis after his first big break-up, but when Jules discovers the truth about the break-up, she comes to an unwelcome realization about herself. Meanwhile, Sara considers whether Jules threatens her relationship with Grayson and turns to Ellie for guidance; and Andy searches for any resemblance between himself and son Stan.
21	21	"Letting You Go"	Michael McDonald	Mara Brock Akil	April 28, 2010	6.49
Jules has mixed feelings when Travis gets accepted to two of his choice colleges, now he must decide between schools in California or one just 20 minutes from home. As Jules struggles with the thought of Travis moving away, Grayson is there for her. Meanwhile, Laurie considers her feelings for Smith when he returns from law school, and Andy longs for the freedom to do whatever he wants around the house, free of Ellie's rules.
22	22	"Feeling a Whole Lot Better"	John Putch	Sanjay Shah	May 5, 2010	5.94
Jules and Grayson consider the notion of FWB, friends with benefits. Meanwhile Andy hires a nanny for Ellie, and Travis benefits from Bobby's unconventional plans to make some extra cash.
23	23	"Breakdown"	Bill Lawrence	Bill Lawrence & Kevin Biegel	May 12, 2010	6.23
Jules encourages Travis to submit a graduation speech. Despite Grayson's warning, a curious Jules reads the speech without permission and is left crushed when she finds she's not been acknowledged. Meanwhile, Ellie uncharacteristically does something nice for Laurie, and Bobby tries to restrain himself from embarrassing Travis on his big day.
24	24	"Finding Out"	Michael McDonald	Ryan Koh	May 19, 2010	6.14
Jules and Grayson hatch an elaborate plan to break the news to Bobby they're dating, and Travis sees the wrath of a truly angry woman for the first time when he forgets his momentous seven-month celebration with Kylie.

== U.S. Nielsen ratings ==
Order	Episode	Rating	Share	Rating/share (18-49)	Viewers (millions)	Rank 18-49 (Timeslot)	Rank 18-49 (Night)	Note
1	"Pilot"	7.1	11	4.4/11	11.28	1	4	
2	"Into the Great Wide Open"	5.7	9	3.8/10	9.25	1	1	
3	"Don't Do Me Like That"	5.0	8	3.2/8	7.84	3	4	
4	"I Won't Back Down"	5.1	8	3.3/8	8.00	3	5	
5	"You Wreck Me"	4.7	7	3.0/8	7.31	3	4	
6	"A Woman in Love (It's Not Me)"	4.8	7	3.2/8	7.54	2	3	
7	"Don't Come Around Here No More"	4.5	7	2.8/7	6.87	3	4	
8	"Two Gunslingers"	4.9	8	3.2/8	7.92	2	3	
9	"Here Comes My Girl"	3.3	6	1.9/6	5.54	4	6	
10	"Mystery Man"	4.4	7	2.8/7	7.01	3	6	
11	"Rhino Skin"	5.0	8	3.3/8	7.88	2	3	
12	"Scare Easy"	4.7	7	3.1/8	7.27	3	6	
13	"Stop Dragging My Heart Around"	4.7	7	3.4/9	7.54	3	5	
14	"All the Wrong Reasons"	4.0	6	2.9/7	6.26	3	5	
15	"When a Kid Goes Bad"	4.1	6	2.8/7	6.41	3	6	
16	"What Are You Doin' in My Life?"	3.5	5	2.3/6	5.35	4	7	
17	"Counting on You"	3.9	6	2.6/7	6.10	3	6	
18	"Turn This Car Around"	4.1	6	2.6/7	6.28	2	5	
19	"Everything Man"	3.8	6	2.6/7	6.01	2	4	
20	"Wake up Time"	3.7	6	2.5/7	5.80	3	5	
21	"Letting You Go"	4.2	7	2.8/7	6.49	2	4	
22	"Feeling a Whole Lot Better"	3.8	6	2.5/7	5.94	3	5	
23	"Breakdown"	3.9	6	2.7/7	6.23	3	5	
24	"Finding Out"	4.0	6	2.8/8	6.14	3	4	

== Sky Living Loves on July 8, 2011 until September 23, 2011 ==
In 2011 of the first season, Repeated Edition Cougar Town aired on Friday 8 July 2011 until Friday 23rd September 2011 with the episode airing again (which aired that 9.00pm and 9.30pm) In July 2011 until September 2011 Repeats on Sky Living Loves Fridays 9.00pm (then 9.30pm)

#	Title	Timeslot	Last Aired date	Viewers (000s) Repeats on Sky Living Loves	Weekly Rank (#)
1-01 (1)	Pilot	9.00 P.M	July 8, 2011	351	#7
1-02 (2)	Into the Great Wide Open	9.30 P.M	July 8, 2011	351	#7
1-03 (3)	Don't Do Me Like That	9.00 P.M	July 15, 2011	351	#7
1-04 (4)	I Won't Back Down	9.30 P.M	July 15, 2011	351	#7
1-05 (5)	You Wreck Me	9.00 P.M	July 22, 2011	351	#7
1-06 (6)	A Woman in Love (It's Not Me)	9.30 P.M	July 22, 2011	351	#7
1-07 (7)	Don't Come Around Here No More	9.00 P.M	July 29, 2011	351	#7
1-08 (8)	Two Gunslingers	9.30 P.M	July 29, 2011	351	#7
1-09 (9)	Here Comes My Girl	9.00 P.M	August 5, 2011	351	#7
1-10 (10)	Mystery Man	9.30 P.M	August 5, 2011	351	#7
1-11 (11)	Rhino Skin	9.00 P.M	August 12, 2011	351	#7
1-12 (12)	Scare Easy	9.30 P.M	August 12, 2011	351	#7
1-13 (13)	Stop Dragging My Heart Around	9.00 P.M	August 19, 2011	351	#7
1-14 (14)	All the Wrong Reasons	9.30 P.M	August 19, 2011	351	#7
1-15 (15)	When a Kid Goes Bad	9.00 P.M	August 26, 2011	351	#7
1-16 (16)	What Are You Doin' in My Life?	9.30 P.M	August 26, 2011	351	#7
1-17 (17)	Counting on You	9.00 P.M	September 2, 2011	351	#7
1-18 (18)	Turn This Car Around	9.30 P.M	September 2, 2011	351	#7
1-19 (19)	Everything Man	9.00 P.M	September 9, 2011	351	#7
1-20 (20)	Wake Up Time	9.30 P.M	September 9, 2011	351	#7
1-21 (21)	Letting You Go	9.00 P.M	September 16, 2011	351	#7
1-22 (22)	Feel a Whole Lot Better	9.30 P.M	September 16, 2011	351	#7
1-23 (23)	Breakdown	9.00 P.M	September 23, 2011	351	#7
1-24 (24)	Finding Out	9.30 P.M	September 23, 2011	351	#7

== See also ==
- List of Cougar Town episodes
