= Cougar Town season 5 =

Cougar Town
- Season 5
- No. of episodes: 13

Release
- Original network: TBS
- Original release: January 7 – April 1, 2014

Season chronology
- ← Previous; Season 4 Next → Season 6

The fifth season of Cougar Town, an American sitcom that airs on TBS, began airing on January 7, 2014. Season five regular cast members include Courteney Cox, Christa Miller, Busy Philipps, Brian Van Holt, Dan Byrd, Ian Gomez, and Josh Hopkins. The sitcom was created by Bill Lawrence and Kevin Biegel.

== Production ==
On March 25, 2013, TBS renewed Cougar Town, produced by ABC Studios. The network ordered 13 episodes for season five, which premiered on January 7, 2014. Matthew Perry guest starred as Sam, a wealthy, eccentric man who attempts to take Jules on a date. Perry marks the third former cast member of Friends to guest star on Cougar Town, after Lisa Kudrow and Jennifer Aniston. Brian Van Holt directed his first episode of Cougar Town this season, making him the second cast member to direct an episode.

== Episodes ==
No. overall	No. in season	Title	Directed by	Written by	Original release date	US viewers (millions)
77	1	"All or Nothing"	Michael McDonald	Blake McCormick	January 7, 2014	1.94
Jules finds it difficult to cope with Travis and Laurie being a couple, now that the relationship has become very physical. Meanwhile, "Penny Can" has gone international and Bobby starts receiving royalty checks. Bobby then goes on a frivolous spending spree, causing Grayson to not-so-politely remind him of his years-overdue bar tab. Opening sequence subtitle: Season five? Didn't see that coming.
78	2	"Like a Diamond"	Brian Van Holt	Melody Derloshon	January 14, 2014	1.55
Jules forgets to pay the bills after moving them online, which results in her car insurance lapsing. Her wedding ring slips off her finger while driving, and in trying to retrieve it she crashes into a wealthy man named Sam (guest star Matthew Perry). In exchange for Sam overlooking the accident, Jules agrees to date him. Meanwhile, Bobby prepares for a big snow after hearing there's a slim chance of a few flakes falling in Gulfhaven, and Ellie tries to poke holes in Laurie's long list of amazing life stories. Opening sequence subtitle: Now with more Friends.
79	3	"Depending on You"	Courteney Cox	Melody Derloshon	January 21, 2014	1.70
Jules' people-pleasing ways gets her in trouble when she can't say "no" to a clingy couple that bought a house from her. Bobby discovers that Dog Travis has pups, and he asks Ellie to help him fight a joint custody battle. Meanwhile, Tom has built a scale model of the cul-de-sac in his garage, complete with remarkably detailed figurines, and Travis makes a comment about the Laurie figure that upsets her. Opening sequence subtitle: This is the episode where everyone drinks a bunch of wine.
80	4	"The Trip to Pirate's Cove"	John Putch	Peter Saji	January 28, 2014	1.43
The town is transformed into a pirate's cove for Buccaneer Week. Andy pleads with Ellie to appeal to tourists by bringing out her alter ego, "Charming Ellie", attempting to step up his mayoral duties. Andy's friendship with Bobby is tested when Bobby tells a crowd of tourists that the beach needs to be closed after he spots a large jellyfish. Meanwhile, Laurie starts baking "naughty cakes" to increase sales. Opening sequence subtitle: Now with pirates.
81	5	"Hard on Me"	John Putch	Mary Fitzgerald	February 4, 2014	1.59
Andy organizes a 5K run in an effort to save his reputation as Mayor after an embarrassing article comes out in the local paper. Jules uses the race to get her dad out of the house and relive his coaching days, but the crew struggles to get through Chick's intense workouts. Meanwhile, Grayson attempts to get back into acting and is excited about landing a role in a commercial, until he realizes it's for an erectile dysfunction product. Opening sequence subtitle: Side effects involve muscle exhaustion, erection problems and flu-like symptoms.
82	6	"Learning to Fly"	John Putch	Michael Lisbe & Nate Reger	February 11, 2014	1.20
After Jules lies to customers at the annual cul-de-sac yard sale, Laurie teaches her about karma. Andy uses some of his new yard sale purchases to test Ellie after betting her that she is unable to go a whole day without being snarky. Meanwhile, Bobby must overcome his phobia of rollercoasters to fulfill his grandfather's dying wish. Opening sequence subtitle: What does the Cougar say?
83	7	"Time to Move On"	Sam Jones	Brad Morris & Emily Wilson	February 18, 2014	1.45
With Travis graduating art school in a few months, Jules starts to worry about his job prospects. Laurie and Ellie pose as a couple in a desperate attempt to get Stan into a fancy new school. Meanwhile, Andy insists on making a cat video with the guys for Bro-day. Opening sequence subtitle: If you're not watching with a glass of wine in your hand, you're sort of missing the point.
84	8	"Mystery of Love"	Courteney Cox	Rachel Specter & Audrey Wauchope	February 25, 2014	1.31
After Travis and Laurie have Jules and Grayson over for brunch, Jules attempts to prove that she and Grayson are the better couple. Andy plans a beach day for Stan to try and convince him that he is a fun dad. Meanwhile, Tom discovers a draft of a teen novel (Travellers) in a box of yard sale junk he purchased, and he tries to help Ellie finish it after she reveals she started writing it years ago. Opening sequence subtitle: If you want to option Travellers, call our agents.
85	9	"Too Much Ain't Enough"	Josh Hopkins	Sean Lavery	March 4, 2014	1.33
Jules enlists Andy to be her business partner in a get-rich-quick scheme after she receives a large commission check. Meanwhile, Grayson tries to act cool around Travis's new hipster friends, and Bobby struggles to feel comfortable with his new man-bag. Opening sequence subtitle: Tonight's episode proves that we are still terrible at naming things.
86	10	"Too Good to be True"	John Putch	Jen D'Angelo	March 11, 2014	1.34
Travis starts an open mic night at Coffee Bucks to bring some culture to the venue, but his plan backfires when Andy shows up with his lame stand-up comedy act. Meanwhile, Tom's daughter Haylee (guest star Julianna Guill) comes to visit, and Grayson and Jules hesitantly play along when they discover that Tom's been lying to Haylee, saying Jules is his girlfriend. Opening sequence subtitle: Several burritos were harmed during the filming of this episode.
87	11	"Refugee"	Michael McDonald	Michael Lisbe & Nate Reger	March 18, 2014	1.22
When Bobby’s boat suddenly goes missing, Jules and Bobby bring back their detective personas, "Blacktop" and "Gumshoe", in order to solve the mystery. Grayson helps Andy win over his new supervisor by teaching him "the neg," and Andy later tries the technique on Ellie. Elsewhere, Laurie and Travis attempt to decorate her apartment together as couple, which leads to their first fight. Opening sequence subtitle: Another Blacktop and Gumshoe mystery.
88	12	"Love Is a Long Road"	Michael McDonald	Mary Fitzgerald	March 25, 2014	1.54
Chick decides to move closer to Jules after his Alzheimers begins to worsen, while Travis prepares for his graduation ceremony. Meanwhile, Ellie and Laurie rivalize over which of them is Jules' #1 best-friend. Opening sequence subtitle: Wine spectators gave this episode 96 points.
89	13	"We Stand a Chance"	Courteney Cox	Peter Saji	April 1, 2014	1.53
Jules cheats on her physical exam, then gets unexpected news when the urine sample she got from Laurie shows that Laurie is pregnant. Laurie and Travis face a possible break-up after Andy puts them in a fake marriage to help him at his job, and they realize they want different things in life. Now it's up to Jules to fix things and reveal the news to them. Meanwhile, Grayson and Bobby challenge a group of youngsters to a break dancing "break-off", but reconsider when they find out they will be grandfathers. Opening sequence subtitle: Goodbye... for now? From...

== Ratings ==
=== U.S. Nielsen ratings ===
Order	Episode	Rating (18–49)	Viewers (millions)	Cable rank (18–49)		Note
Order	Episode	Rating (18–49)	Viewers (millions)	Timeslot	Night	Note
1	"All or Nothing"	0.9	1.94	4	16	
2	"Like a Diamond"	0.7	1.55	4	25	
3	"Depending on You"	0.8	1.70	5	20	
4	"The Trip to Pirate's Cove"	0.7	1.43	7	41	
5	"Hard on Me"	0.7	1.59	8	32	
6	"Learning to Fly"	0.6	1.20	5	30	
7	"Time to Move On"	0.7	1.45	5	21	
8	"Mystery of Love"	0.6	1.31	8	29	
9	"Too Much Ain't Enough"	0.6	1.33	10	42	
10	"Too Good to be True"	0.7	1.34	7	23	
11	"Refugee"	0.6	1.22	8	36	
12	"Love Is a Long Road"	0.7	1.54	7	20	
13	"We Stand a Chance"	0.8	1.53	6	19	
