= All the Wrong Reasons =

All the Wrong Reasons may refer to:

- "All the Wrong Reasons", a 2010 episode of the television series Cougar Town
- All the Wrong Reasons (film), a 2013 Canadian comedy-drama
- "All the Wrong Reasons" (song), a 1991 song by Tom Petty and the Heartbreakers on their album Into the Great Wide Open

== See also ==
- For All the Wrong Reasons
