= What Are You Doin' in My Life =

What Are You Doin' in My Life may refer to:

- "What Are You Doin' in My Life?" an episode of Cougar Town
- "What Are You Doin' in My Life," a song from Tom Petty and the Heartbreakers' 1979 album Damn the Torpedoes
