= Here Comes My Girl (Cougar Town) =

- Cougar Town episode
- Jules watches as her family and friends celebrate Thanksgiving.
- Episode no.: Season 1 Episode 9
- Directed by: Lee Shallat-Chemel
- Written by: Sam Laybourne
- Original air date: November 25, 2009

Guest appearance
- Spencer Locke as Kylie

Episode chronology
← Previous "Two Gunslingers"	Next → "Mystery Man"
- Cougar Town season 1

"Here Comes My Girl" is the ninth episode of the first season of the American television sitcom Cougar Town. It originally aired on November 25, 2009 in the United States on ABC.

== Plot ==
Jules's plan for a romantic dinner for two backfires for Thanksgiving. Travis shows off his girlfriend Kylie to everyone. Jules gives Travis and Kylie advice on birth control. Bobby and Grayson bond over a common interest.

== Reception ==
=== Ratings and viewership ===
In its original broadcast, "Here Comes My Girl" was watched by 5.53 million American viewers and attained a 1.9/6 rating/share in the 18–49 demographic.

=== Critical reception ===
The episode received generally favorable reviews. Joel Keller, from TV Squad, said that he realizes "two things about the show: the more the show concentrates on the ensemble and less on Jules, the funnier it is" and that there's gotta be more "interaction between Courteney Cox and Dan Byrd," praising their acting in the episode.
