= Love Is a Long Road =

Love Is a Long Road may refer to:

- "Love Is a Long Road" (song), by Tom Petty
- Love Is a Long Road (album), by Canadian country music group High Valley
  - "Love Is a Long Road", a song from the album
- "Love Is a Long Road", episode of Cougar Town (season 5)
