= List of Cougar Town episodes =

Cougar Town is an American sitcom television series that premiered on September 23, 2009 on the American Broadcasting Company (ABC). The pilot premiered after Modern Family. On October 8, 2009, after airing 3 episodes, ABC announced that Cougar Town had been picked up for a full season. On May 8, 2012, ABC canceled the series after three seasons. Two days later, TBS picked up the series for a fourth season, and ultimately concluded it with a sixth and final season.

The series, set somewhere along Florida's Gulf Coast, follows the life of Jules Cobb (Courteney Cox), a recently divorced woman in her forties facing the often humorous challenges, pitfalls and rewards of life's next chapter, along with her son, ex-husband, and wine-loving friends who together make up her dysfunctional, but supportive and caring extended family.

Episode 36, "A Thing About You", was broadcast in Canada on January 12 as originally scheduled but was subject to a short-notice preemption in the U.S. and was shown on ABC January 19, 2011. The vast majority of episodes, excluding the pilot and "Everything Man", are titled after songs by Tom Petty, who is from Florida.

During the course of the series, 102 episodes of Cougar Town aired over six seasons, between September 23, 2009, and March 31, 2015.

== Series overview ==
Season	Episodes	Originally released			Rank
Season	Episodes	First released	Last released	Network	Rank
1	24	September 23, 2009	May 19, 2010	ABC	57
2	22	September 22, 2010	May 25, 2011	ABC	67
3	15	February 14, 2012	May 29, 2012	ABC	107
4	15	January 8, 2013	April 9, 2013	TBS	—N/a
5	13	January 7, 2014	April 1, 2014	TBS	—N/a
6	13	January 6, 2015	March 31, 2015	TBS	—N/a

== Episodes ==
=== Season 1 (2009–10) ===
No. overall	No. in season	Title	Directed by	Written by	Original release date	US viewers (millions)
1	1	"Pilot"	Bill Lawrence	Kevin Biegel & Bill Lawrence	September 23, 2009	11.28
2	2	"Into the Great Wide Open"	Chris Koch	Bill Lawrence	September 30, 2009	9.25
3	3	"Don't Do Me Like That"	Gail Mancuso	Kevin Biegel	October 7, 2009	7.84
4	4	"I Won't Back Down"	Michael Spiller	Chrissy Peitroch & Jessica Goldstein	October 14, 2009	8.00
5	5	"You Wreck Me"	Jamie Babbit	Linda Videtti Figueiredo	October 21, 2009	7.31
6	6	"A Woman in Love (It's Not Me)"	Ken Whittingham	Ryan Koh	October 28, 2009	7.54
7	7	"Don't Come Around Here No More"	Sanjay Shah	Sanjay Shah	November 4, 2009	6.87
8	8	"Two Gunslingers"	Phil Traill	Mary Fitzpatrick	November 18, 2009	7.92
9	9	"Here Comes My Girl"	Lee Shallat-Chemel	Sam Laybourne	November 25, 2009	5.54
10	10	"Mystery Man"	John Putch	Teleplay by : Christine Pietrosh & Jessica Goldstein; Story by : Kevin Biegel	December 9, 2009	7.01
11	11	"Rhino Skin"	Millicent Shelton	Kate Purdy	January 6, 2010	7.88
12	12	"Scare Easy"	Chris Koch	Kevin Biegel	January 13, 2010	7.27
13	13	"Stop Dragging My Heart Around"	Michael McDonald	Mara Brock Akil	January 20, 2010	7.54
14	14	"All the Wrong Reasons"	Michael Spiller	Peter Saji	February 3, 2010	6.26
15	15	"When a Kid Goes Bad"	Michael McDonald	Linda Videtti Figueiredo	February 10, 2010	6.41
16	16	"What Are You Doin' in My Life?"	Gail Mancuso	Jessica Goldstein & Chrissy Pietrosh	March 3, 2010	5.35
17	17	"Counting on You"	Gail Mancuso	Melody Derloshon	March 10, 2010	6.10
18	18	"Turn This Car Around"	John Putch	Kate Purdy	March 24, 2010	6.28
19	19	"Everything Man"	Michael McDonald	Sam Laybourne	March 31, 2010	6.01
20	20	"Wake Up Time"	John Putch	Michael McDonald	April 14, 2010	5.80
21	21	"Letting You Go"	Michael McDonald	Mara Brock Akil	April 28, 2010	6.49
22	22	"Feeling a Whole Lot Better"	John Putch	Sanjay Shah	May 5, 2010	5.94
23	23	"Breakdown"	Bill Lawrence	Bill Lawrence & Kevin Biegel	May 12, 2010	6.23
24	24	"Finding Out"	Michael McDonald	Ryan Koh	May 19, 2010	6.14

=== Season 2 (2010–11) ===
No. overall	No. in season	Title	Directed by	Written by	Original release date	US viewers (millions)
25	1	"All Mixed Up"	Bill Lawrence	Kevin Biegel & Bill Lawrence	September 22, 2010	8.32
26	2	"Let Yourself Go"	Michael McDonald	Kevin Biegel	September 29, 2010	6.97
27	3	"Makin' Some Noise"	John Putch	Sam Laybourne	October 6, 2010	7.10
28	4	"The Damage You've Done"	John Putch	Chrissy Pietrosh & Jessica Goldstein	October 13, 2010	7.23
29	5	"Keeping Me Alive"	Michael McDonald	Sanjay Shah	October 20, 2010	7.38
30	6	"You Don't Know How It Feels"	Michael McDonald	Blake McCormick	October 27, 2010	8.16
31	7	"Fooled Again (I Don't Like It)"	John Putch	Peter Saji & Melody Derloshon	November 3, 2010	7.43
32	8	"Little Girl Blues"	Michael McDonald	Kate Purdy	November 17, 2010	7.05
33	9	"When the Time Comes"	Bruce Leddy	Mary Fitzgerald	November 24, 2010	6.62
34	10	"The Same Old You"	Michael McDonald	Ryan Koh	December 8, 2010	6.44
35	11	"No Reason to Cry"	Gail Mancuso	Gregg Mettler	January 5, 2011	6.57
36	12	"A Thing About You"	Gail Mancuso	Mary Fitzgerald & Kate Purdy	January 19, 2011	5.68
37	13	"Lost Children"	Michael McDonald	Ryan Koh & Sam Laybourne	January 26, 2011	5.03
38	14	"Cry to Me"	Bruce Leddy	Melody Deloshon	February 2, 2011	6.51
39	15	"Walls"	Bill Lawrence	Sean Lavery	April 18, 2011	7.88
40	16	"Baby's a Rock 'N' Roller"	Michael McDonald	Peter Saji	April 20, 2011	6.18
41	17	"You're Gonna Get It"	Michael McDonald	Michael McDonald	April 27, 2011	5.62
42	18	"Lonesome Sundown"	Bruce Leddy	Sanjay Shah & Blake McCormick	May 4, 2011	5.49
43	19	"Damaged by Love"	Michael McDonald	Aaron Ho	May 11, 2011	6.02
44	20	"Free Fallin'"	Michael McDonald	Gregg Mettler	May 18, 2011	5.23
45	21	"Something Good Coming, Part 1"	Michael McDonald	Jessica Goldstein & Chrissy Pietrosh	May 25, 2011	5.01
46	22	"Something Good Coming, Part 2"	Bill Lawrence	Bill Lawrence & Kevin Biegel	May 25, 2011	5.01

=== Season 3 (2012) ===
No. overall	No. in season	Title	Directed by	Written by	Original release date	US viewers (millions)
47	1	"Ain’t Love Strange"	Bill Lawrence	Bill Lawrence	February 14, 2012	4.88
48	2	"A Mind With a Heart of Its Own"	John Putch	Chrissy Pietrosh & Jessica Goldstein	February 21, 2012	4.49
49	3	"Lover's Touch"	Michael McDonald	Michael McDonald	February 28, 2012	4.30
50	4	"Full Moon Fever"	Courteney Cox	Sanjay Shah	March 6, 2012	4.33
51	5	"A One Story Town"	Bill Lawrence	Kevin Biegel	March 13, 2012	4.17
52	6	"Something Big"	Michael McDonald	Gregg Mettler	March 20, 2012	4.38
53	7	"You Can Still Change Your Mind"	John Putch	Blake McCormick	April 10, 2012	4.81
54	8	"Ways to Be Wicked"	Bruce Leddy	Sam Laybourne	April 17, 2012	4.45
55	9	"Money Becomes King"	Michael McDonald	Ryan Koh	April 24, 2012	4.89
56	10	"Southern Accents"	Bruce Leddy	Kate Purdy	May 1, 2012	4.77
57	11	"Down South"	John Putch	Mary Fitzgerald	May 8, 2012	4.63
58	12	"Square One"	Courteney Cox	Peter Saji	May 15, 2012	3.31
59	13	"It'll All Work Out"	John Putch	Melody Derloshon	May 15, 2012	3.22
60	14	"My Life"	John Putch	Kevin Biegel	May 29, 2012	3.42
61	15	"Your World"	John Putch	Bill Lawrence	May 29, 2012	3.42

=== Season 4 (2013) ===
No. overall	No. in season	Title	Directed by	Written by	Original release date	US viewers (millions)
62	1	"Blue Sunday"	Courteney Cox	Bill Lawrence	January 8, 2013	2.18
63	2	"I Need to Know"	Courteney Cox	Chrissy Pietrosh & Jessica Goldstein	January 15, 2013	2.02
64	3	"Between Two Worlds"	John Putch	Kevin Biegel	January 22, 2013	2.04
65	4	"I Should Have Known It"	Michael McDonald	Melody Derloshon	January 29, 2013	2.06
66	5	"Runnin' Down A Dream"	John Putch	Justin Halpern & Patrick Schumacker	February 5, 2013	2.10
67	6	"Restless"	Courteney Cox	Austen Faggen	February 12, 2013	2.43
68	7	"Flirting With Time"	Courteney Cox	Blake McCormick	February 19, 2013	2.18
69	8	"You and I Will Meet Again"	John Putch	Peter Saji	February 26, 2013	1.93
70	9	"Make It Better"	Courteney Cox	Rachel Specter & Audrey Wauchope	March 5, 2013	1.71
71	10	"You Tell Me"	Michael McDonald	Brad Morris & Emily Wilson	March 12, 2013	1.60
72	11	"Saving Grace"	Michael McDonald	Blake McCormick	March 19, 2013	1.87
73	12	"This Old Town"	John Putch	Melody Derloshon	March 26, 2013	1.75
74	13	"The Criminal Kind"	Randall Keenan Winston	Sean Lavery	April 2, 2013	1.94
75	14	"Don't Fade on Me"	John Putch	Melody Derloshon & Blake McCormick	April 9, 2013	1.81
76	15	"Have Love Will Travel"	John Putch	Mary Fitzgerald & Peter Saji	April 9, 2013	1.38

=== Season 5 (2014) ===
No. overall	No. in season	Title	Directed by	Written by	Original release date	US viewers (millions)
77	1	"All or Nothing"	Michael McDonald	Blake McCormick	January 7, 2014	1.94
78	2	"Like a Diamond"	Brian Van Holt	Melody Derloshon	January 14, 2014	1.55
79	3	"Depending on You"	Courteney Cox	Melody Derloshon	January 21, 2014	1.70
80	4	"The Trip to Pirate's Cove"	John Putch	Peter Saji	January 28, 2014	1.43
81	5	"Hard on Me"	John Putch	Mary Fitzgerald	February 4, 2014	1.59
82	6	"Learning to Fly"	John Putch	Michael Lisbe & Nate Reger	February 11, 2014	1.20
83	7	"Time to Move On"	Sam Jones	Brad Morris & Emily Wilson	February 18, 2014	1.45
84	8	"Mystery of Love"	Courteney Cox	Rachel Specter & Audrey Wauchope	February 25, 2014	1.31
85	9	"Too Much Ain't Enough"	Josh Hopkins	Sean Lavery	March 4, 2014	1.33
86	10	"Too Good to be True"	John Putch	Jen D'Angelo	March 11, 2014	1.34
87	11	"Refugee"	Michael McDonald	Michael Lisbe & Nate Reger	March 18, 2014	1.22
88	12	"Love Is a Long Road"	Michael McDonald	Mary Fitzgerald	March 25, 2014	1.54
89	13	"We Stand a Chance"	Courteney Cox	Peter Saji	April 1, 2014	1.53

=== Season 6 (2015) ===
No. overall	No. in season	Title	Directed by	Written by	Original release date	US viewers (millions)
90	1	"American Dream Plan B"	Courteney Cox	Blake McCormick	January 6, 2015	1.04
91	2	"Full Grown Boy"	John Putch	Kevin Biegel	January 13, 2015	0.88
92	3	"To Find a Friend"	John Putch	Melody Derloshon	January 20, 2015	0.85
93	4	"Waiting for Tonight"	Michael McDonald	Brad Morris & Emily Wilson	January 27, 2015	1.04
94	5	"Even the Losers"	Busy Philipps	Sean Lavery	February 3, 2015	0.87
95	6	"The Wrong Thing to Do"	John Putch	Eric Ernst	February 10, 2015	0.91
96	7	"The Wild One, Forever"	Josh Hopkins	Blake McCormick	February 17, 2015	1.32
97	8	"This One's for Me"	Michael McDonald	Brad Morris & Emily Wilson	February 24, 2015	1.07
98	9	"Two Men Talking"	John Putch	Melody Derloshon	March 3, 2015	0.99
99	10	"Yer So Bad"	John Putch	Sean Lavery	March 10, 2015	1.22
100	11	"Climb That Hill"	Courtney Rowe	Melody Derloshon	March 17, 2015	1.37
101	12	"A Two Story Town"	John Putch	Sean Lavery & Brad Morris & Emily Wilson	March 24, 2015	1.21
102	13	"Mary Jane's Last Dance"	Courteney Cox	Bill Lawrence & Blake McCormick & Kevin Biegel	March 31, 2015	1.24

== Viewing figures ==
=== Seasons 1–3 ===
Cougar Town : U.S. viewers per episode (millions)

Season	Episode number																							
Season	1	2	3	4	5	6	7	8	9	10	11	12	13	14	15	16	17	18	19	20	21	22	23	24
1	11.28	9.25	7.84	8.00	7.31	7.54	6.87	7.92	5.54	7.01	7.88	7.27	7.54	6.26	6.41	5.35	6.10	6.28	6.01	5.80	6.49	5.94	6.23	6.14
2	8.32	6.97	7.10	7.23	7.38	8.16	7.43	7.05	6.62	6.44	6.57	5.68	5.03	6.51	7.88	6.18	5.62	5.49	6.02	5.23	5.01	5.01	–	
3	4.88	4.49	4.30	4.33	4.17	4.38	4.81	4.45	4.89	4.77	4.63	3.31	3.22	3.42	3.42	–								

Audience measurement performed by Nielsen Media Research

=== Seasons 4–6 ===
Cougar Town : U.S. viewers per episode (millions)

Season	Episode number														
Season	1	2	3	4	5	6	7	8	9	10	11	12	13	14	15
4	2.18	2.02	2.04	2.06	2.10	2.43	2.18	1.93	1.71	1.60	1.87	1.75	1.94	1.81	1.38
5	1.94	1.55	1.70	1.43	1.59	1.20	1.45	1.31	1.33	1.34	1.22	1.54	1.53	–	
6	1.04	0.88	0.85	1.04	0.87	0.91	1.32	1.07	0.99	1.22	1.37	1.21	1.24	–	

Audience measurement performed by Nielsen Media Research
