= Cougar Town =

American television sitcom (2009–2015)

- Genre: Sitcom
- Created by: Bill Lawrence; Kevin Biegel
- Showrunners: Bill Lawrence; Kevin Biegel; Blake McCormick
- Starring: Courteney Cox; Christa Miller; Busy Philipps; Dan Byrd; Josh Hopkins; Ian Gomez; Brian Van Holt; Bob Clendenin
- Country of origin: United States
- Original language: English
- No. of seasons: 6
- No. of episodes: 102 (list of episodes)

Production
- Executive producers: Bill Lawrence; Courteney Cox; David Arquette; Ric Swartzlander; Blake McCormick; Randall Keenan Winston
- Producers: Mark J. Greenberg; Thea Mann; Sanjay Shah; Ryan Koh; Sam Laybourne; Mary Fitzgerald; Patrick Schumacker; Justin Halpern; Lewis Abel
- Camera setup: Film; Single camera
- Running time: 22 minutes
- Production companies: Doozer; Coquette Productions; ABC Studios

Original release
- Network: ABC
- Release: September 23, 2009 – May 29, 2012
- Network: TBS
- Release: January 8, 2013 – March 31, 2015

Cougar Town is an American television sitcom that ran for 102 episodes over six seasons, from September 23, 2009, until March 31, 2015. The first three seasons aired on ABC, with the series moving to TBS for the remaining three seasons. ABC officially gave the series a full season pickup on October 8, 2009, after airing 3 episodes. On May 8, 2012, ABC canceled the series after three seasons. Two days later, TBS picked up the series for a fourth season, and ultimately concluded it with a sixth and final season.

The show was created by Bill Lawrence and Kevin Biegel and was produced by Doozer and Coquette Productions in association with ABC Studios. Filming took place at Culver Studios in Culver City, California. The pilot episode achieved 11.28 million viewers. Season 2 premiered on September 22, 2010, with 8.35 million viewers. Season 3, consisting of 15 episodes, was originally slated to premiere in November 2011 but, because of ABC's promotion of the ill-fated Man Up!, it premiered on February 14, 2012. Following the season 3 finale, it was announced that TBS had purchased the rights to the series for an additional 15-episode season, to air in 2014, with options for additional seasons. On March 25, 2013, TBS renewed the series for a fifth season of 14 episodes, which premiered on January 7, 2014. On May 10, 2014, TBS renewed Cougar Town for a sixth and final season. Season six premiered on January 6, 2015, and the series concluded on March 31, 2015.

At the 67th Golden Globes, Cox received a nomination for Best Actress – Television Series Musical or Comedy.

== Premise ==
Set in the fictional town of Gulfhaven, Florida, which is nicknamed "Cougar Town" because its high-school team mascot is a cougar, the series focuses on Jules Cobb, a recently divorced woman in her 40s facing the often humorous challenges, pitfalls, and rewards of life's next chapter, along with her teenage son, her ex-husband, and her wine-loving friends who together make up her dysfunctional but supportive and caring extended family. Most scenes in the series take place in Jules's home, Gray's Pub, or around her ex-husband's boat.

== Cast and characters ==
=== Main cast ===
- Courteney Cox as Jules Cobb – a recently divorced, single mother exploring the truths about dating and aging. Jules spent most of her 20s and 30s married to Bobby and raising a son, Travis. Because she has been out of the dating world for a while, Jules discovers it is difficult to find love again. At first, she tried to make up for lost time by dating younger men, thus becoming a "cougar", but the show quickly took a different turn as the character began to pursue men her own age. From the end of season 1, she began dating her divorced neighbor Grayson, whom she married in season 3. She resides in Gulfhaven, Florida and is a successful real estate agent. A close-up of her driver's license in a season 2 episode reveals her full first name to be Julia and her birth date to be November 15, 1968 (age 42 as of that season). Her self-centered, demanding behavior is usually overlooked by her friends and family, who balance it with her generosity and basic decency. Gregarious and optimistic, she's also an unapologetic anti-intellectual who loves wine and often drinks it out of an oversized glass, which she names. Her giant wine glasses (in order of appearance) are: Big Joe, Big Carl, Big Kimo (on vacation in Hawaii), then back to Big Carl, followed by Big Lou, Big Tippi, Big Sue, and Big Chuck. While she holds a pseudo-funeral for each broken glass, she quickly replaces them. She is often visited by her father, Chick, who is a widower since his wife, Jules's mother, died several years prior to the series. An only child, she often struggles with insecurity and abandonment issues.
- Christa Miller as Ellie Torres – Jules's feisty next door neighbor and best friend. A former corporate attorney turned stay-at-home mother, Ellie is easily the most intellectual among the group. She is married to Andy Torres, and the two have a son named Stan. She is Jules's sarcastic, unapologetic confidante who takes pleasure in teasing Laurie, and to a lesser extent, Bobby, Grayson and Travis. Ellie's hard-polished guardedness belies a fierce loyalty. Ellie is a somewhat reluctant mother, demanding a nanny despite being a stay-at-home mom. She is usually quite dominant over Andy, who adores her. In season 6, she goes back to her corporate attorney job, after becoming bored and learning that Andy really wants to be a stay-at-home dad.
- Busy Philipps as Laurie Keller – Jules's young attractive employee who is known for her fun-loving personality. Laurie works with Jules in the same real estate office, as her assistant. Prior to Jules's relationship with Grayson, Laurie encouraged Jules to get out and have some fun and tried to reacquaint her to the world of dating. Laurie has survived a rough childhood in foster care, and is initially a trashy party animal, but matures throughout the show as she learns how to become a functional grown-up. Ellie (who refers to her as "Jellybean") is initially openly hostile towards Laurie, but their relationship develops into a grudging respect and eventually a close, open friendship. She initially had many short-lived boyfriends and one-night stands, before enjoying a long-term relationship with young lawyer Smith Frank in seasons 1 and 2, and later a long-distance relationship with Wade, a soldier in Afghanistan, in seasons 3 and 4. She leaves Jules's employ and starts a successful cake shop in season 3. During season 4, she develops a crush on Travis, and they get together at the end of the season and date for the rest of the series. She and Travis have a son at the beginning of season 6.
- Dan Byrd as Travis Cobb – Jules's and Bobby's son, who is a senior in high school at the start of the series, then later attends a local college. He loves both of his parents although he is frequently embarrassed by both of them. In high school, he dealt with humiliation from his friends and classmates but has made friends at college. He is generally supportive of his mother, but finds her parenting style a bit too smothering. After dealing with his mom's real estate ads around town and his dad's new job as his former high school's grass cutter, his father helps him realize not to worry about what other people think. Spending a lot of time with his parents and their friends, he often flirts with Laurie and is shown to have a crush on her. At the end of season 4 he gets together with Laurie. During season 5 their relationship is shown to be in constant competition with Jules and Grayson's, and he and Laurie have a son named Bobby at the beginning of season 6. He has a passion for photography and attends art college. Finding few career prospects after graduating college, he starts a mobile wine delivery business.
- Josh Hopkins as Grayson Ellis – Owner of Gray's Pub, he lives across the street from Jules. Like Jules, he is newly divorced at the start of the series; unlike Jules, he embraced his newly single lifestyle. Early on, Grayson enjoyed dating younger women and rubbing it in Jules's face. Eventually, he revealed that he wanted to have kids but his ex-wife did not, a fact that becomes more painful when he learns that she and the man she left Grayson for are now expecting a child. He and Jules begin dating at the end of season 1, and in season 3, Grayson formally proposed marriage to Jules which she accepted. His desire to have children is a source of conflict with Jules until he discovers in season 3 that he has fathered a daughter, Tampa, during one of his post-divorce flings; he maintains an active role in Tampa's life, although this is seldom acknowledged in the show. He is a former model and aspiring but mediocre actor who plays guitar, and he often makes up songs about the group and reminisces about his acting days. He is nicknamed "Dime-Eyes" by Ellie, who believes his eyes are too small for his face.
- Ian Gomez as Andy Torres – Ellie's husband who is also Jules's next door neighbor. Andy, an investment advisor, is a devoted husband to Ellie and also a loving father to their son, Stan. He and Jules's ex-husband Bobby are best friends, and Andy is shown to have a hero worship for Bobby. From season 4 until season 6 he is the mayor of Gulfhaven, although this is rarely mentioned and he often forgets that he has the position. Upon losing his job in season 6, Andy expresses a strong desire to be a stay-at-home dad, which results in Ellie going back to work.
- Brian Van Holt as Bobby Cobb (seasons 1–5; guest season 6) – Jules's ex-husband who lives on his boat in a parking lot, which makes him legally homeless. Bobby married Jules after she became pregnant with their son, Travis. He was a professional golfer, and had numerous extramarital affairs during his career, which led to Jules divorcing him prior to the events of the pilot episode, although they still share a close friendship and even hooked up once. Bobby gives golf lessons and mows the lawn at Travis' former high school, and drives a well-worn golf cart. He frequently refers to Jules as "J-Bird". He also has invented a game, Penny Can, which is featured in several episodes. He has short-term relationships with Travis' photography teacher Angie in season 3 and surfing buddy Lisa Riggs in season 4. Van Holt exited the series at the beginning of the sixth season, as his character took a club pro job at a golf course in Georgia.
- Bob Clendenin as Tom Gazelian (season 6; recurring seasons 1–5) – Jules's widowed neighbor who expresses his attraction for her in weird ways, makes wine in his garage, and is always doing things for Jules and the gang without getting anything back in an attempt to become part of their group. He is frequently found to be peering into Jules's kitchen window, unnoticed by Jules and/or the gang until he says something. By season 4 he is considered one of the gang, appearing in most episodes and accompanying the group wherever they go, although still generally standing outside Jules's window instead of in the kitchen with the others. His behaviour is often weird and creepy, and details of his otherwise normal and successful life (that he is a millionaire neurosurgeon, former all-state track star, with an adult son in the Marines and a daughter attending law school) are slowly revealed as the series progresses.

=== Recurring cast ===
- Carolyn Hennesy as Barb Coman (seasons 1–3) – a man-hungry older cougar who is a competitor of Jules in real estate. She usually appears briefly to deliver a lascivious one-liner. As Jules observes in one episode, "do you just follow me around, waiting to say things?" In season 3 it is revealed that Barb is now married to Roger Frank (father of Laurie's season 2 boyfriend), a reference to the show no longer being about 'cougars'.
- Ken Jenkins as Chick (seasons 2–6) – Jules's father who is a keen lover of horses and whose favourite holiday is Halloween. Chick officiates Grayson and Jules' wedding in the season three finale after becoming ordained as a minister online. In season four he is diagnosed with Alzheimer's disease, after complaining about his memory worsening for some time, and he moves in with Jules in season 5 to allow her to watch over him.
- Nick Zano as Josh (season 1) – a younger man who dated Jules, but wanted a more serious relationship than her and she therefore ended things. The actor Nick Zano left the show due to his offer on Melrose Place, which was later cancelled.
- Spencer Locke as Kylie (seasons 1–2) – Travis' girlfriend at the start of the series. Travis loses his virginity to Kylie, but the two later break up after they both cheat on each other with Travis kissing Heather Spangler and Kylie kissing Joey Spangler. The couple later reconciles and continues to date into season 2, even though Kylie reveals that she no longer wants to be exclusive with Travis. They break up for good when Travis meets his first college girlfriend.
- Ryan Devlin as Smith Frank (seasons 1–2) – a young lawyer and Laurie's one-time boyfriend. In season 2, Smith breaks up with Laurie after she admits to Jules that she is in love with him and he realizes he does not feel the same way. Still, he represented the longest and most serious relationship that Laurie had had up to that stage in her life.
- Barry Bostwick as Roger Frank (seasons 1–3, 5) – a wealthy businessman and Smith's father. He strongly disapproves of Laurie, receives golfing lessons from Bobby, and eventually buys "Penny Can" from both of them. In season 3, he marries Barb Coman. Roger was the mayor of Gulfhaven until Andy's election.
- LaMarcus Tinker as Kevin (seasons 2–3) – Travis' college roommate and friend. Travis annoys Kevin when they first meet, as he's trying to find his way in college. However, Travis earns Kevin's respect and they become good friends.
- Collette Wolfe as Kirsten (season 2) – Travis' new, slightly older girlfriend, whom he met in his first semester of college. When she revealed she was moving away, Travis impulsively proposed to her, but she immediately rejected him and was not seen again on the series.
- Sheryl Crow as Sara Kramer (season 1) – a likeable and sexy wine vendor whose semi-serious relationship with Grayson was his first with a woman his age after his post-divorce period of targeting younger, naive girls for affection. Sara breaks up with Grayson after it becomes clear that he also has feelings for Jules.
- David Clayton Rogers as Matt (seasons 1–2) – Matt appears in the pilot episode who Jules meets at a bar and spills wine over. Matt is Jules's lover and is the first person she sleeps with after her divorce and therefore becoming a 'cougar'. The character of Matt appears in season two as a friend of Grayson's unknowingly to Jules, when Grayson learns that they have slept together.
- Gloria Garayua as Rosa (season 2) – Stan's babysitter employed by Ellie and Andy to care for their son. Rosa was a recurring character often mentioned and seen during season two.
- Sarah Chalke as Angie LeClaire (season 3) – Travis' photography teacher at his University in Florida. She becomes a love interest for Bobby after Travis shows her photos of him for one of his assignments. Jules sets up a planned date for Bobby and Angie involving Grayson, Laurie, Travis, Tom and Andy. She leaves after her impulsive unplanned lifestyle does not mesh with Bobby's.
- Nicole Sullivan as Lynn Mettler (seasons 3–4) – Jules's new therapist whom she goes to for advice about her engagement to Grayson. Jules also uses therapy with Lynn as a punishment which she uses on Grayson, Ellie and Bobby.
- Edwin Hodge as Wade (seasons 3–4) – Laurie's boyfriend in a long-distance relationship. He is a soldier stationed in Afghanistan. When he comes home, however, their relationship is short-lived.
- Briga Heelan as Holly (seasons 3, 6) – One of Grayson's former lovers from when he first became single, whom he found out has a daughter that is his.
- Shawn Pitkin as Sig (seasons 3–4) – Travis' new house mate, who does not like the fact that Travis' family shows up at any given moment.
- Sawyer Ever (seasons 3–4) and Griffin Kunitz (seasons 4–6) as Stan Torres – Known as the devil baby, his whereabouts never seems to be known to his parents. He likes to sneak out of the house with a hammer and smash the neighbors landscaping lights.
- Maria Thayer as Lisa Riggs (season 4) – Bobby's surfing buddy whom he initially treats as "one of the guys" but later develops an attraction for, and the two begin a relationship. After a few appearances, her first name was revealed to be Lisa. She does not return in season 5 and no explanation is given for her absence.
- Brad Morris as Jerry (seasons 4–6) – One of Bobby's friends that he kept avoiding because he owed him money, although the two settled the debt when Bobby let him use his boat's parking lot for his wedding. Jules and Grayson have grown to dislike Jerry and his wife, Bonnie.
- Emily Wilson as Bonnie (seasons 4–6) – Bobby's AA sponsor when he was pretending to be Ron Mexico. Shortly afterwards, Bonnie and Jerry hired Jules to find them a house, and later had Jules and Grayson as maid of honor and best man at their wedding. She has a crush on Grayson and flirts inappropriately with him.

=== Guest cast ===
Guest stars on the show include:

- David Arquette, the show's producer and Cox's then-husband.
- Three of Cox's former Friends co-stars: Lisa Kudrow in season one as a mean dermatologist, Jennifer Aniston in season two as Glenn, Jules's therapist, and Matthew Perry in season five as the millionaire that proposes to Jules.
- Danny Pudi, who made a brief appearance as his character Abed Nadir from Community, tying into a reference made on the other show about Abed appearing on Cougar Town.
- Many of the show's guest stars were either regulars or had recurring or guest roles on Bill Lawrence's two previous television series, Spin City and Scrubs – in addition to Cougar Town main cast members Courteney Cox, Christa Miller and Bob Clendenin, and recurring cast members Ken Jenkins and Sarah Chalke, all of whom had roles in Scrubs (main roles for Jenkins and Chalke, recurring for Miller and Clendenin, and a three-episode arc for Cox), and recurring cast member Barry Bostwick, who had a main role in Spin City, respectively.
  - Other Spin City main cast members Alan Ruck and Richard Kind, and guest star Michael McDonald, also had guest roles in Cougar Town.
  - Aside from the casting overlap in the Cougar Town main and recurring cast, guest stars from Scrubs include Zach Braff, Robert Maschio, Sam Lloyd, Scott Foley, Nicole Sullivan, Windell Middlebrooks, and Shaughn Buchholz. The final scene of season 3's "A One Story Town" featured several actors from Scrubs; including Sarah Chalke, Sam Lloyd along with his band The Blanks reprising their roles as Ted Buckland and The Worthless Peons, Robert Maschio, and an uncredited cameo by Zach Braff.

== Episodes ==
Season	Episodes	Originally released			Rank
Season	Episodes	First released	Last released	Network	Rank
1	24	September 23, 2009	May 19, 2010	ABC	57
2	22	September 22, 2010	May 25, 2011	ABC	67
3	15	February 14, 2012	May 29, 2012	ABC	107
4	15	January 8, 2013	April 9, 2013	TBS	—N/a
5	13	January 7, 2014	April 1, 2014	TBS	—N/a
6	13	January 6, 2015	March 31, 2015	TBS	—N/a

== Production ==
=== Conception ===
Cougar Town was created by Bill Lawrence and Kevin Biegel. Following the cancellation of Dirt, Courteney Cox wanted to return to television and do another comedy. Lawrence, who is best known as the creator of Scrubs and Spin City, was approached by Cox about "wanting to do something". While developing the concept of the show, Lawrence thought he would do a tryout with Cox on Scrubs, by guest starring in the first three episodes of the eighth season. Lawrence and Biegel, who worked together writing episodes on Scrubs, came up with the concept of the show with Cox as a 40-year-old newly single woman because he thought that it was a real "zeitgeist-y topic". He drew inspiration from his real-life wife, actress Christa Miller who also stars in the show as Ellie; Miller had previously worked with Cox as part of the story-arc of the three part Scrubs tryout. Lawrence told Cox that the show could be "high risk, high reward", although Cox decided to go for it. He added, "I rarely have this much trepidation because usually the only person I could let down is myself. I want to make it work for her."

Before he pitched the idea to ABC, other titles for the show included 40 and Single and The Courteney Cox Show, which was eventually named Cougar Town because Lawrence thought that "the title is noisy and that people will be aware of this show". He felt that the risk of the title was that the audience would not watch it because people would say "the title bums me", commenting, "it's a risky roll of the dice ... We don't call women 'cougars' in it. We certainly don't use the word beyond the unbelievably big cheat that the high school mascot is a cougar." Lawrence believed that with the subsequent scripts they would be doing and the reshoots in the pilot, the show would be "creatively satisfying". After he pitched the idea to ABC, they asked him to have a pilot ready to shoot by the end of January 2009. Lawrence and Biegel together wrote the script with Lawrence, who has written and directed many episodes on Scrubs, directing the episode. In casting beyond Cox, Lawrence created the character of Ellie for his wife, Christa Miller. Miller felt that her character started off "gleefully" and reported that Lawrence would write down little things that she would say.

=== Filming ===
The series takes place in the fictional town of Gulf Haven in Sarasota County, Florida. Filming took place on the Miami Street backlot located at the Culver Studios in Culver City, California. The Cul-de-sac used for filming is also located in Culver City on Lamarr Avenue. Lawrence served as executive producer/writer/director, Kevin Biegel as writer/co-executive producer, and Courteney Cox and David Arquette as executive producers. Cougar Town was produced by Doozer Productions and Coquette Productions and was aired weekly on ABC, before moving to TBS for its fourth season. The sitcom was filmed in the single-camera format.

=== Music ===
The original theme is written by WAZ and original music for Cougar Town is composed by WAZ, Jamie Jackson, Will Golden and Al Sgro. Bill Lawrence stated; "As a show composer WAZ brings something incredibly special. He has the ability to make score music sound current, like it was just lifted off the radio, and yet, it still services the show perfectly ... As a group we're confident that WAZ will be the next singer/songwriter that we try to claim credit for. He's that good." Songs such as Phoenix's "Lisztomania", Foghat's "Slow Ride", and La Roux's "Bulletproof (Remix)" were all used in the pilot episode. In the second episode, Beyoncé Knowles's "Single Ladies (Put a Ring on It)" and Keren DeBerg's "Today" as well as "Tell Me" were used on the show. A full version of the theme song was released in February 2012 to coincide with the shows return.

=== Opening sequence ===
The opening sequence features a map of Florida showing Sarasota County, Florida. In the season 1 episodes, the title sequence zooms in from the outline of Florida to show Sarasota with a "Welcome to Cougar Town" sign. The producers wanted something different for the setting of the show and decided to include a map of the show's setting in the sequence, commenting: "Everyone's in New York or Los Angeles. I think there's a lot of fun to be had in that area and with those characters." Jeanne Corcoran, the director of the Sarasota County Film commission, spoke to the show's production assistants to be able to use the locality as the setting and including it on the opening sequence.

=== Potential name change ===
In May 2010, it was reported that the show's producers were considering a name change because the plot had strayed so far from its initial premise. Stephen McPherson, who headed ABC Entertainment, was said to be "on board" with a name change should the producers decide to go ahead. Research also showed that many viewers who ignored the show based on its name actually enjoyed it after seeing a screening of an episode. However, the name change was scrapped, and the show retained the title Cougar Town for its second season. Bill Lawrence later stated that two potential titles that they wanted to change to were declined by ABC – Sunshine State (declined because ABC also had a Matthew Perry sitcom on their mid-season schedule that season known as Mr. Sunshine) and Grown Ups (declined because of the then-recent film with the same name).

On May 27, 2011, Bill Lawrence announced through his Twitter account that the name of the show would change for season 3 with input from the fans, but did not give any further details. In June 2011, Courteney Cox hinted that one of the frontrunners for the new title is Friends with Beverages, but stated that "there are still other titles on the board". Lawrence tweeted on September 9, 2011, that "Those that loved title 'Cougar Town' ... Not around for much longer", hinting that the title would be changed. Ultimately, the show retained the original title for the third season, with the first opening sequence subtitle stating that "[they're] not happy about it".

On February 14, 2012, Cox and Lawrence revealed in an interview that a title change could still take place for the fourth season, mentioning Wine Time, The Sunshine State and Family Jules as potential titles. However, after announcing that the show would move to TBS for the fourth season, Lawrence said if TBS wants that title to change, then it will, but also said that he doubts it will happen.

On August 28, 2012, the show announced its new season on its new Facebook page for the now TBS show, with a picture that stated, "Turns out even a new network couldn't change the title." However, even TBS has poked fun in their promos for the new season, referring to Cougar Town as a "crappy title".

In the final episode, the title sequence called the show Sunshine State.

=== Network change ===
On May 10, 2012, TBS announced that Cougar Town would join its lineup in the beginning of 2013 for 15 episodes, after ABC canceled the series. Moving to TBS gave the show the possibility of receiving more episodes and publicity than had the show remained on ABC.

== Connection to Community ==
Cougar Town became frequently mentioned in the NBC comedy series Community starting with season 2, as the favorite show of Abed Nadir, portrayed by Danny Pudi. This culminates in a gag in the episode "Critical Film Studies" where Abed claims that he had a walk-on role as an extra that he internally named "Chad", leading him to have an identity crisis (although this is eventually revealed to be a lie). Pudi makes a cameo on Cougar Town in the episode "Something Good Coming, Part 1" where he is listening in on a conversation between Laurie and Travis, before getting up and running away.

In the Community episode "For a Few Paintballs More", Busy Philipps and Dan Byrd make uncredited cameos in a crowd scene at the end of the paintball war.

Later in the season 3 episode of Community, "Biology 101", Abed watches the fictional British show-within-a-show, Cougarton Abbey (a portmanteau of Cougar Town and Downton Abbey), from which Cougar Town was adapted within the series' reality. Cougarton Abbey is later referenced as one of the title sequence jokes in Cougar Town, which reads "Welcome to Cougarton Abbey".

== Connection to Scrubs ==
The recurring character Ted Buckland from Bill Lawrence's previous television series Scrubs, played by Sam Lloyd, acts as a special guest star in a cameo capacity in 3 episodes of the series, in addition to his band The Worthless Peons also appearing.

The final scene of season 3's "A One Story Town" in particular featured several actors from Scrubs; in addition to Lloyd along with his band The Blanks reprising their roles as Ted Buckland and The Worthless Peons, it also featured Scrubs main cast member Sarah Chalke, recurring cast member Robert Maschio, and an uncredited cameo by the series' lead actor Zach Braff.

In addition to narrative and character crossover, many of the show's cast members were either regulars or had recurring or guest roles on Scrubs. Overlapping cast members between the shows include Cougar Town main cast members Courteney Cox, Christa Miller and Bob Clendenin, and recurring cast members Ken Jenkins and Chalke, all of whom had roles in Scrubs (main roles for Jenkins and Chalke, recurring for Miller and Clendenin, and a three-episode arc for Cox). Cougar Town guest stars who were in Scrubs include the aforementioned Braff, Maschio and Lloyd, as well as Scott Foley, Nicole Sullivan, Windell Middlebrooks, and Shaughn Buchholz.

== Reception ==
In the US the audience dropped from 11 million to 6 million over the first season. In Australia the audience dropped from 1.3 to 1 million in one week after the chief executive of the Australian channel showing it (Seven Network) described it as a "shit show" that he could get large audiences for by promoting it. In the United Kingdom, the first season aired on LIVING, and was shown in double-bills on Tuesday nights at 9pm. The season premiered on March 30, 2010, to a strong 802,000 viewers and concluded on June 15, 2010, to a series low of 593,000 viewers. However, the entire season was the most-watched show on LIVING, averaging 769,000 viewers.

=== Seasonal ratings ===
Ratings for Cougar Town by season
Season	Timeslot (EST)	Network	No. of episodes	Season premiere	Viewers	18–49 rating	Season finale	Viewers	18–49 rating	TV season	Rank	Viewers (in millions)
1	Wednesday 9:30 pm	ABC	24	September 23, 2009	11.28	4.4	May 19, 2010	6.14	2.8	2009–10	57	7.34
2	Wednesday 9:30 pm	ABC	22	September 22, 2010	8.32	3.4	May 25, 2011	5.01	2.0	2010–11	67	7.34
3	Tuesday 8:30 pm	ABC	15	February 14, 2012	4.88	1.8	May 29, 2012	3.42	1.2	2011–12	107	5.19
4	Tuesday 10:00 pm	TBS	15	January 8, 2013	2.18	1.1	April 9, 2013	1.38	0.6	2012–13	N/A	1.93
5	Tuesday 10:00 pm	TBS	13	January 7, 2014	1.94	0.9	April 1, 2014	1.53	0.8	2013–14	N/A	1.47
6	Tuesday 10:30 pm	TBS	13	January 6, 2015	1.04	0.5	March 31, 2015	1.24	0.5	2014–15	N/A	1.08

=== Broadcast ===
Cougar Town premiered on September 23, 2009, in the Wednesday 9:30 pm timeslot. The pilot episode aired between the other two pilots, Modern Family and Eastwick. The series premiered with 11.4 million viewers, coming first in its timeslot. The second episode scored 9.14 million viewers, although it dropped 2.14 million viewers from the pilot, as well as other shows that night such as Modern Family and Eastwick.

==== International ====
In Canada the show aired on City. The fifth season began on the network on February 26, 2014. The sixth season premiered on February 19, 2015.

In the United Kingdom, after being dropped by Sky Living, the show is now streamed by Blinkbox (from Tesco). All seasons are now streaming on Amazon Prime.

=== Critical reception ===
Cougar Town opened to mixed reviews from critics. Metacritic gave the series 49 out of 100 based on the pilot episode, from the 21 reviews. Ken Tucker of Entertainment Weekly gave the pilot episode a B, commenting that the show mixes "clinical realism (when did you last hear a C-section scar used as a punchline?) with ridiculous slang (a new boob job is referred to as gorilla heads), Cougar Town is so brashly vulgar, it's endearing". Tucker also wrote that "the entire show is about getting and having sex... Cougar is so single-minded that this obsession itself becomes funny". Variety stated that the show "does feed into the dual sense of insecurity and self-empowerment that women harbor about getting older ... though, the execution here is consistently about as subtle as a kick to the groin". Los Angeles Times' Mary McNamara said that the "maddening thing about Cougar Town is that it isn't completely unfunny or uncharming". Alan Sepinwall of The Star-Ledger feels that "Cougar Town is still finding itself, but it's already much better than the title would suggest [...] the show "has to walk a very careful line between making fun of the cougar concept and embracing it" although based on the two episodes "Cougar Town is self-aware enough to pull that off". USA Today was also favorable, saying that the show has "the right cast and good writing".

Many critics have speculated that the show would only have a narrow target audience: older women; with Alessandra Stanley of The New York Times stating that the show's "plot description alone could drive away male viewers" while the Los Angeles Times' Mary McNamara opined that it "is fun and exciting for women over 40". Despite speculation, the show has done well with young males and young adults in all key demographics.

In contrast, a writer for feminist blog Jezebel disapproved stating, "It's clichéd, it's lame, it's undignified. It smacks of predatory desperation." Ryan Brockington of New York Post compared the show to Samantha Who?. The Daily News' David Hinckley opined that the show is "a waste of Cox's comic talents". In The Irish Times Kate Holmquist writes that "Cox is both a symbol and a red light warning for everything that is wrong with the Hollywood portrayal of middle-aged women, who are rarely wise or strong or naturally aged" and states that she is "the female version of the pervert in a dirty raincoat".

The second season received more positive reviews. The second season holds an average score of 75 out of 100 on Metacritic, based on seven reviews, indicating 'generally favorable reviews'. Tim Stack from Entertainment Weekly regarded the season in a positive light, citing that "very few shows can get away with genuine moments of emotion while also incorporating the phrase 'dead-baby tacos'". Hitfix writer Alan Sepinwall also gave a positive review of the show, saying that "midway through the first season the writers realized their cast was so funny together that the wisest course was to just put everyone together as often as possible. This is still the show that Cougar Town became at mid-season last year."

The much-delayed third season of Cougar Town became the most critically acclaimed season of the series, garnering an average Metacritic score of 80 out of 100, based on five reviews. RedEye gave the season a positive review, stating that it "returns with its wit, silliness and good-heartedness fully intact." TV Guide concluded: "witty and wacky, this sharp-tongued, sweet-souled sitcom picks up without losing a (heart)beat." The Huffington Post summed up their review by noting that fans of the show will "find a lot to like about the new season." Despite this, the 3rd season ranked 107th among viewers, and was quickly dropped by ABC afterwards. The show continued its run on the cable network TBS.

== Home media ==
Home media releases for Cougar Town
Season	Release date			No. of discs
Season	Region 1	Region 2	Region 4	No. of discs
The Complete First Season	August 17, 2010; February 5, 2013 (re-release)	September 27, 2010	December 1, 2010	3 (U.S.); 4 (UK & AU)
The Complete Second Season	August 30, 2011; February 5, 2013 (re-release)	November 7, 2011	November 2, 2011	3 (U.S.); 4 (UK & AU)
Seasons One and Two	—N/a	November 7, 2011	—N/a	8
The Complete Third Season	February 5, 2013	December 3, 2012	February 6, 2013	2
Complete Seasons 1, 2, 3	—N/a	December 3, 2012	—N/a	10
The Complete Fourth Season	—N/a	April 6, 2015	August 13, 2014	2

In early 2013, Lionsgate Home Entertainment acquired the home video rights to shows produced by ABC Studios and announced the release of season three on DVD for February 5, 2013. That same day, Lionsgate re-released seasons one and two. The re-releases retained the same artwork and disc content as their original releases.

As of July 2017, seasons four through six have not been released on DVD in the United States or Canada, and the DVD releases for the first three seasons have been taken out of print. Since 2016, Seasons 5–6 have not been released in the United Kingdom, and a "Complete Collection" boxset has not been released since the series ended. Despite this, the entire series is available for purchase on iTunes and streaming on Hulu.

Internationally, the entire series has been added to the Disney+ streaming service under the dedicated hub Star.
