= Kevin Biegel =

American television writer and producer

Kevin Buford Biegel is a television writer/producer, the co-creator of Cougar Town and creator of Enlisted.

In April 2017, it was announced that Biegel would serve as showrunner for the live-action New Warriors television series, which would be based on the Marvel Comics superhero team with the same name. The show was not picked up, however, after production languished for over a year.

== Scrubs ==
Biegel got his first staff writing job on Scrubs, in its fifth season. In that season he wrote the episode "My Missed Perception" as well co-wrote the season finale "My Transition." In the sixth season he was promoted to story editor. In that season he wrote "My Fishbowl" and co-wrote "My Rabbit." In the seventh season he was promoted to executive story editor, he wrote the only unaired episode of Scrubs entitled "My Commitment." The episode was not completely filmed due to the writers strike, material from the episode was later used in an episode of season eight. For the eighth season he became a co-producer and wrote two episodes. They were, "My Nah Nah Nah", which had story lifted from the incomplete seventh season episode, and "My Cuz." The show would go on to a ninth season, but Biegel moved on to work on his new show Cougar Town.

== Cougar Town ==
While working on the eighth season of Scrubs in which Courteney Cox guest starred, she asked Bill Lawrence to come up with a show for her. After coming up with the initial concept he asked Biegel to write the pilot with him. Lawrence directed the pilot and the series was picked up for 13 episodes.

After airing on ABC's new "Wednesday Night Comedy Lineup" to mixed reviews the show was picked up for nine more episodes, bringing season one's episode total to 24. Other than the pilot Biegel has written the third episode "Don't Do Me Like That," and has gotten the story credit for the tenth episode "Mystery Man." Biegel acts as co-executive producer and co-head writer, along with Lawrence. The first three seasons aired on ABC, with the series moving to TBS for the final three seasons.

== Other work ==
Before getting the writing job on Scrubs, Biegel worked as a writers' assistant for many years.

Between the seventh and eighth season of Scrubs, Biegel worked as a consultant on South Park.

The 2023 film The Machine directed by Peter Atencio from a script by Biegel and Scotty Landes. Biegel had also joined the production to worked in writing a script back in April 2021.
