= Brian Van Holt =

American actor (born 1969)

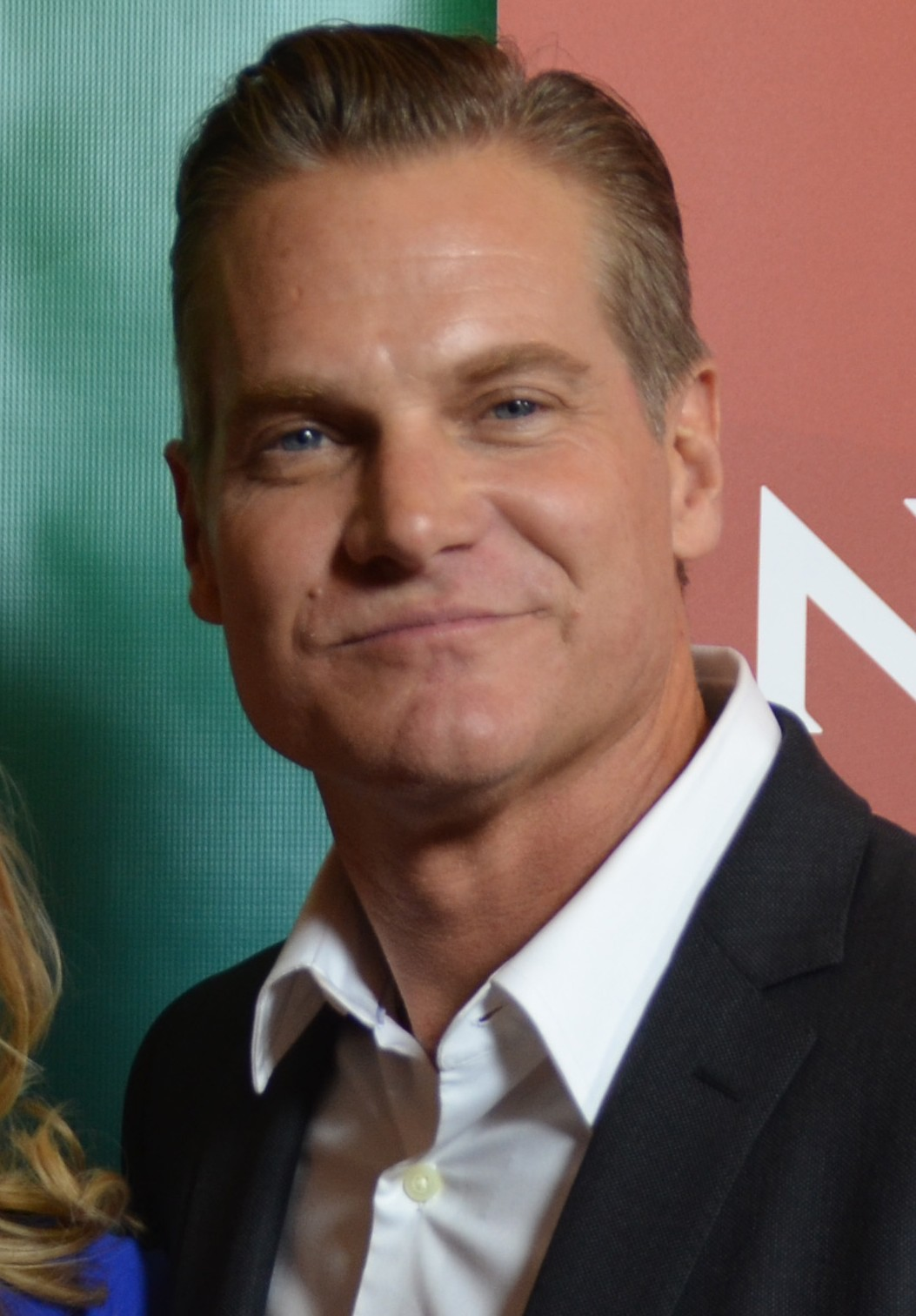
- Van Holt in July 2014
- Born: July 6, 1969 (age 57); Waukegan, Illinois, U.S.
- Education: University of California, Los Angeles (BA)
- Occupation: Actor
- Years active: 1996–present

Brian Van Holt (born July 6, 1969) is an American actor. He is best known for playing Bo and Vincent Sinclair in the 2005 film House of Wax and Bobby Cobb on the TV series Cougar Town.

== Early life ==
Brian Van Holt was born in Waukegan, Illinois on July 6, 1969, and was raised in Huntington Beach, California. He is of Scottish and Irish descent (not Dutch as is widely believed), saying in April 2003, "My nickname is 'Dutch' but my family's part of the McGregor clan. No one really knows where 'Van Holt' came from." He graduated from UCLA in 1993, with a major in sociology and a minor in psychology.

== Career ==
Van Holt was cast in several films and television series beginning with A Very Brady Sequel in 1996, followed by appearances in episodes of Beverly Hills, 90210, Spin City, Homicide: Life on the Street, Martial Law, and Sex and the City. He then appeared in the feature films, Black Hawk Down, Windtalkers, Confidence, Basic and S.W.A.T..

He has since appeared in Man of the House, House of Wax, and the short-lived CBS series Threshold. Van Holt revisited his surfer roots when he was cast in David Milch's HBO series John from Cincinnati as Butchie Yost, son of surfing legend Mitch Yost. He also played Kyle Hobart in the TV series Sons of Anarchy. He guest-starred in the hit show CSI: Miami.

In 2008, he had a small role as himself (an actor) playing a firefighter in two fifth-season episodes of Entourage. From 2009 to 2015, Van Holt appeared as one of the seven main characters on Cougar Town as Bobby Cobb, the ex-husband of lead character Jules Cobb and father of their son Travis. He appeared in six seasons of Cougar Town, exiting the show at the beginning of the sixth and final season. He also directed the second episode of the fifth season, "Like a Diamond", which aired on January 14, 2014.

== Filmography ==
=== Film ===
Year	Title	Role	Notes
1996	A Very Brady Sequel	Warren Mulaney	
1997	L.A. Johns	Chris	Television film
1997	Steel Chariots	Franklin Jones	Television film
1999	The Underground Comedy Movie	Lifeguard	
2000	Whipped	Brad	
2001	Black Hawk Down	Jeff Struecker	
2002	Windtalkers	Private Andrew Harrigan	
2002	A Day in the Life of Nancy M. Pimental	Tad	Short film
2003	Confidence	Miles	
2003	Basic	Sergeant Ray Dunbar	
2003	S.W.A.T.	Officer III Michael Boxer	
2005	Man of the House	FBI Agent Eddie Zane	
2005	House of Wax	Bo Sinclair / Vincent Sinclair	Double role
2012	Bullet to the Head	Ronnie "Cowboy Ronnie" Earl	
2014	Wild	Ranger	
2018	Den of Thieves	Detective Murphy "Murph" Connors	
2020	Butter	Frank	
2024	Boneyard	Detective Ortega	
TBA	Way of the Warriors	Bob Stephenson	

=== Television ===
Year	Title	Role	Notes
1996	Flipper	—N/a	Episode: "Surf Gang"
1997	Beverly Hills, 90210	Eric Anderson	Episode: "Aloha Beverly Hills: Part 2"
1997	Spin City	Brent	Episode: "Radio Daze"
1998	Homicide: Life on the Street	Peter Fields	Episode: "Closet Cases"
1998	Beyond Belief: Fact or Fiction	Michael	Episode: "The Plane, The Gun, The Portrait, The Pass & The Caller"
1998	Sins of the City	—N/a	Episode: "Blind Eye for Hire"
1998	Martial Law	Lance Carter	Episode: "Cop Out"
1999	LateLine	Grant Kendall	Episode: "The Christian Guy"
1999	Sex and the City	Wylie Ford	Episode: "The Caste System"
1999–2000	Love & Money	Eamon McBride	Main cast; 5 episodes
2000	The $treet	Chad	Episode: "Pilot"
2005–06	Threshold	Sean Cavennaugh	Main cast; 13 episodes
2007	John from Cincinnati	Mitch "Butchie" Yost II	Main cast; 10 episodes
2008	Sons of Anarchy	Kyle Hobart	Episode: "Giving Back"
2008	The Ex List	Shane Gallagher	Episode: "Do You Love Me, Do You Surfer... Boy"
2008	Entourage	Malone	2 episodes
2009	CSI: Miami	Terrance Chase	Episode: "And They're Offed"
2009	Burn Notice	Harlan	Episode: "Friends and Family"
2009	The Cleaner	Greg	Episode: "Split Ends"
2009–15	Cougar Town	Bobby Cobb	Main cast; 89 episodes Also directed the episode "Like a Diamond"
2011	The Middle	Neighbor	Uncredited; episode: "Bad Choices"
2012	CSI: Crime Scene Investigation	Captain Mike Robinson	Episode: "CSI on Fire"
2013–14	The Bridge	Ray Burton	10 episodes
2014	Agents of S.H.I.E.L.D.	Carver / Sebastian Derik	2 episodes
2014	Ascension	William Denninger	Miniseries; 6 episodes
2015	Community	Willy	Episode: "Laws of Robotics and Party Rights"
2016	Grandfathered	Luke	Episode: "Budget Spa"
2017	Training Day	Jeff Kullen	Episode: "Wages of Sin"
2018	LA to Vegas	Dean	Episode: "The Affair"
2018	Life in Pieces	Wayne Winger	Episode : "Parents Ancestry Coupon Chaperone"
2020	Deputy	Deputy Cade Walker	Main role
2022	Green Eggs and Ham	TBA (voice)	Episode: TBA
2022	Joe vs. Carole	John Reinke	Limited series
