= Dan Byrd =

American actor (born 1985)

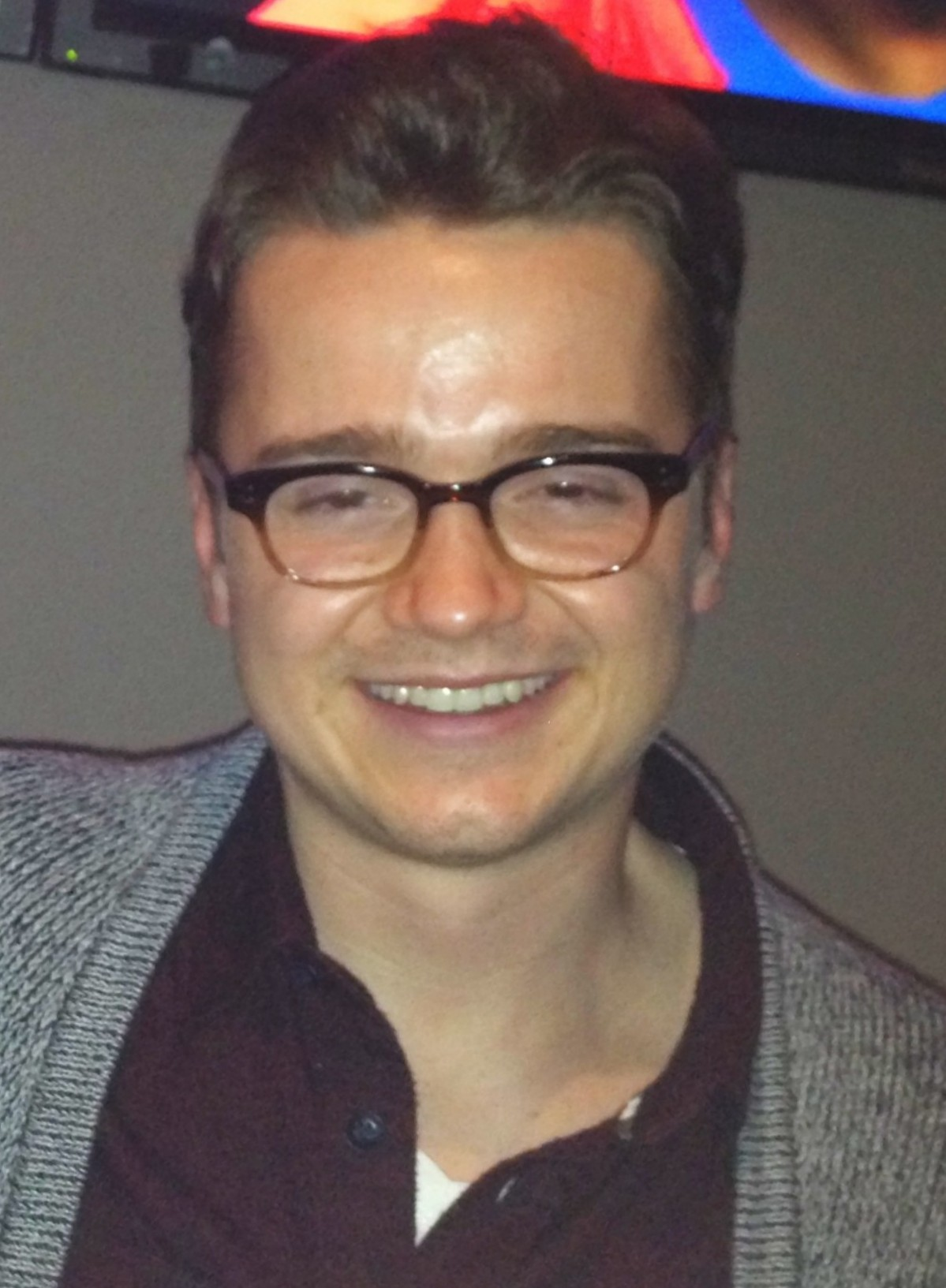
- Byrd in February 2012
- Born: Daniel Byrd; November 20, 1985 (age 41); Chicago, Illinois, U.S.
- Occupation: Actor
- Years active: 1998–present
- Spouse: Lauren Smith (m. 2016)

Daniel Byrd (born November 20, 1985) is an American actor. His most prominent roles include the 2004 film A Cinderella Story, the 2006 remake of The Hills Have Eyes, the 2010 films Easy A and Norman, and the sitcoms Aliens in America, Young Sheldon, and Cougar Town.

== Early life ==
Byrd was born in Chicago, Illinois, the son of Jeff and Rachel Byrd, and was raised in Marietta, Georgia. He has two younger siblings, Ryan and Molly. He attended school until 10th grade, at which point he began homeschooling.

== Career ==
Byrd's feature film debut was in the 1999 film The First of May, which starred Julie Harris and Mickey Rooney. He then went on to make a string of appearances in television series such as Judging Amy, Any Day Now, ER, and Touched by an Angel before gaining his first break-out role in the TNT miniseries Salem's Lot, playing schoolboy Mark Petrie.

In 2004, Byrd co-starred in A Cinderella Story, opposite Hilary Duff. He played Carter Farrell, the method acting best friend of Duff's Cinderella character Sam Montgomery. The project was followed by short-lived CBS series Clubhouse.

In 2006, Byrd starred in Alexandre Aja's remake of The Hills Have Eyes, based on Wes Craven's original 1977 cult classic film. Also in 2006, Byrd starred opposite John Travolta in the period crime thriller Lonely Hearts. The story follows real-life killers Martha Beck and Raymond Fernandez, who develop a twisted infatuation with each other as they travel the country luring unsuspecting victims through personal ads in the newspaper. Travolta played the lead detective on the case and Byrd played his troubled son.

Byrd was set to appear in the 2007 remake of Revenge of the Nerds, but after three weeks of filming, the project was cancelled. He then went on to star in the CW comedy Aliens in America, which follows a Wisconsin homemaker who arranges to host a foreign exchange student, believing the visitor will help her shy son (played by Byrd) become more popular. However, the show only lasted one season.

In October 2008, Entertainment Weekly reported that Byrd had been cast in Heroes in a recurring role as Sylar's (Zachary Quinto) apprentice. He plays Luke Campbell, who has the ability to emit microwave pulses. He appeared in three episodes during "Volume 4: Fugitives". Byrd also appeared in an episode of ABC Family's Greek as Clark Duke's character's high school friend.

In 2009, Byrd began starring in the comedy series Cougar Town, as Travis Cobb the son of Courteney Cox's character. The show ran for three seasons on ABC before transitioning to TBS for the remainder of its run.

In 2010, Byrd co-starred in Easy A opposite Emma Stone. He played Brandon, a gay friend of Stone's character Olive Penderghast, whom she pretends to have sex with at a house party to boost their social standings.

He stars as the title character in the 2010 film Norman, a film which follows the story of a high school senior who perpetuates a lie that he is terminally ill with cancer to gain sympathy from his peers.

Recent television credits include Unbreakable Kimmy Schmidt, The Good Doctor (American TV series), and Young Sheldon.

== Personal life ==
Byrd, his parents, and his then-fiancée (now wife) Lauren Smith opened gastropub Two Birds Taphouse in Marietta, Georgia in 2016. In January 2025, ownership was transferred to the then head chef Briton Nevitt. He and Smith married in Los Olivos, California that same year.

== Filmography ==
| Year | Title | Role | Notes |
|---|---|---|---|
| 1998 | The First of May | Cory Wainwright | |
| 1999 | The Price of a Broken Heart | Eric Hutlemeyer | |
| 2000 | 28 Days | Dan | |
| 2001 | Judging Amy | Todd | Episode: "Adoption Day" |
| 2001 | The Fighting Fitzgeralds | Young Patrick | Episode: "Pilot |
| 2001 | Just Ask My Children | Brian Kniffen | Television film |
| 2001 | ER | Russ | Episode: "If I Should Fall from Grace" |
| 2002 | Untitled Eric Gilliland Project | Himself | |
| 2002 | CSI: Crime Scene Investigation | Jake Bradley | Episode: "Burden of Proof" |
| 2002 | Firestarter: Rekindled | Paul | |
| 2002 | Any Day Now | Young Colliar Sims | 61 episodes |
| 2002 | The Nightmare Room | Drew | 2 episodes |
| 2002 | State of Grace | Kenny Moss | 2 episodes |
| 2002 | Boomtown | Eddie Colson | Episode: "The Squeeze" |
| 2002 | Touched by an Angel | Scott Hardwick | Episode: "Jump!" |
| 2003 | Presidio Med | Curtis Altman | Episode: "Breathless" |
| 2003 | The Guardian | Jeremy Hetherington | 2 episodes |
| 2004 | Joan of Arcadia | Scott Brooks | Episode: "State of Grace" |
| 2004 | Salem's Lot | Mark Petrie | 2 episodes |
| 2004 | A Cinderella Story | Carter Farrell | |
| 2005 | Are We There Yet? | Himself | |
| 2005 | Checking Out | Jason Apple | |
| 2005 | Mortuary | Jonathan Doyle | |
| 2004–2005 | Clubhouse | Scott Hardwick | 11 episodes |
| 2006 | The Hills Have Eyes | Bobby Carter | |
| 2006 | Jam | Josh | |
| 2006 | Pepper Dennis | Frat boy | Episode: "Frat Boys May Lose Their Manhood" |
| 2006 | Lonely Hearts | Eddie Robinson | |
| 2006 | Outlaw Trail: The Treasure of Butch Cassidy | Jess | |
| 2007 | Ghost Whisperer | Jason Bennett | Episode: "The Walk-In" |
| 2007 | Boston Legal | Edward Scanlon | Episode: "Trial of the Century" |
| 2007–2008 | Aliens in America | Justin Tolchuck | 18 episodes |
| 2008 | Greek | Kirk | Episode: "Three's a Crowd" |
| 2008 | Heroes | Luke Campbell | 3 episodes |
| 2009–2015 | Cougar Town | Travis Cobb | 102 episodes |
| 2010 | Norman | Norman Long | |
| 2010 | Easy A | Brandon | |
| 2011 | Community | Greendale Team Member | Episode: "For a Few Paintballs More"; uncredited |
| 2012 | Suburgatory | Josh Sherman | Episode: "Out in the Burbs" |
| 2014 | Mad Men | Wayne Barnes | Episode: "Time Zones" |
| 2015 | Scandal | Virgil Plunkett | 2 episodes |
| 2015 | Sisters | Patrick Campbell | |
| 2017 | Doomsday | Nate | Television film |
| 2018 | The Good Cop | Donovan Demark | Episode: "Who Cut Mrs. Ackroyd in Half?" |
| 2018–2019 | The Good Doctor | Tyler Durness | 2 episodes |
| 2019 | Unbreakable Kimmy Schmidt | Josh Hoffman | Episode: "Kimmy is in a Love Square!" |
| 2020 | Utopia | Ian | 8 episodes |
| 2021-2023 | Young Sheldon | Pastor Rob | 8 episodes |
| TBD | Autobiography | Bryce | |

== Awards and nominations ==
Awards Won:

- 2000: Burbank International Children's Film Festival: Best Child Actor for The First of May
- 2000: Young Artist Award: Best Supporting Actor in a Drama Series for Any Day Now
- 2010: Rhode Island International Film Festival: Best Actor for Norman

Awards Nominations:

- 2001: Young Artist Award: Best Supporting Actor in a Drama Series for Any Day Now
- 2005: Young Artist Award: Best Performance in a TV Movie, Miniseries or Special- Leading Young Actor for Salem's Lot
