= My Own Worst Enemy (Scrubs) =

- Scrubs episode
- Episode no.: Season 7 Episode 1
- Directed by: Bill Lawrence
- Written by: Neil Goldman and Garrett Donovan
- Production code: 701
- Original air date: October 25, 2007

Guest appearances
- Elizabeth Banks as Dr. Kim Briggs; Kevin Rahm as Joe Hutnick; Robert Maschio as Todd Quinlan; Travis Schuldt as Keith Dudemeister; Manley Henry as Snoop Dogg Attending; Kit Pongetti as Lady Williams; Geoff Stevenson as Dr. Seymour Beardfacé; Aseem Batra as Josephine

Episode chronology
← Previous "My Point of No Return"	Next → "My Hard Labor"
- Scrubs season 7

"My Own Worst Enemy" is the first episode of the seventh season and 140th overall episode of the American television sitcom Scrubs. Written by Neil Goldman and Garrett Donovan and directed by series creator Bill Lawrence, it originally aired on October 25, 2007 on NBC, and was watched by 6.95 million viewers.

== Plot ==
After Elliot almost kisses J.D. in the on-call room, she begins to question her engagement with Keith.

The episode then focuses on epiphanies by the main characters. Elliot realizes she carried on a meaningless relationship due to her desire to be married; consequently, she calls off the wedding twice. J.D. realizes his tendency to sabotage himself and yearns to avoid it, but fails when he refuses to believe that the Janitor has a girlfriend named Lady. Meanwhile, Turk is challenged with choosing the semi-annual candy bar he is allowed to eat because of his diabetes. He, too, has an epiphany and decides to make a random selection.

Throughout the episode, Dr. Cox, Turk, and Dr. Kelso pull together to diagnose a very charming patient, Joe Hutnik. Cox, upon telling Dr. Beardfacé that if he wants to lose the nickname "Beardface", he has to shave his beard, realizes that his initial diagnosis of Lyme disease was correct, citing Occam's Razor (which J.D. references internally while holding a Razr cell phone). In this case, the patient's tick bite was not discovered because it was under his hair.

J.D. consults Turk about Kim, because he feels he's only with her because she is pregnant with his child. He realizes that's true—but because of the trauma of his parents divorcing, he will stay with Kim even though he's not in love with her.

== Continuity ==
- Carla tells Elliot and J.D. not to obsess over their own hypocrisies because it is human nature to want what's best for others even if you have difficulty following your own advice. She also says that she doesn't want to have to repeat this advice "two weeks from now". Two episodes later, in "My Inconvenient Truth", she repeats the same rant to Elliot and the Janitor.
- Turk mentions that the only girl who was good for J.D. was "Mole Butt". He is referring to Elliot, whom he previously addressed with this nickname in "Her Story II" when mentioning J.D's previous girlfriends.
- Turk can now grow a full head of hair, whereas in previous seasons (for instance, in "My Way Home") he was said to be balding and only able to grow hair in patches.
- At the beginning of the episode, the words "Veer felt at" and "Peace Sam" are seen on the locker behind J.D. "Peace Sam" can also be seen in the episode "My Screw Up".
- The Janitor's girlfriend Lady is played by Kit Pongetti, who previously appeared as Dr. Mitchell in the season two episode "My Philosophy".
- The discovery of a tick bite under a patient's hair was used as a plot device two weeks later in "Ugly", an episode of House.

== Reception ==
Television Without Pity gave this episode a B rating, and questioned whether the show was becoming a daytime soap due to the plot of the sixth season finale and this episode. Travis Fickett of IGN complimented Scrubs' consistent quality and resolution of the previous episode's cliffhanger, and gave it an 8.4/10 ("Impressive") rating.
