= My Finale =

- Scrubs episodes
- Episode nos.: Season 8 Episodes 18/19
- Directed by: Bill Lawrence
- Written by: Bill Lawrence
- Production code: 816/817
- Original air date: May 6, 2009

Guest appearances
- Tom Cavanagh as Dan Dorian; Robert Maschio as Dr. Todd Quinlan; Amy Smart as Jamie Moyer (Tasty Coma Wife); Elizabeth Bogush as Alex Hanson; Josh Cooke as Dan Stonewater; Nicole Sullivan as Jill Tracy; Michael Learned as Patricia Wilk; Aloma Wright as Laverne Roberts; Aaron Ikeda as Rex; Bellamy Young as Dr. Grace Miller; Sam Lloyd as Ted; The Blanks as The Worthless Peons; Kate Micucci as Stephanie Gooch; Shaughn Buchholz as Jason "Cabbage" Cabbagio; Stephanie D'Abruzzo as Patti Miller; Michael McDonald as Mike Davis; Colin Hay as himself; Charles Chun as Dr. Phillip Wen; Mike Schwartz as Lloyd; Kit Pongetti as Ladinia "Lady" Williams; Travis Schuldt as Keith Dudemeister; Frank Encarnacao as Dr. Walter Mickhead; Robert E. Beckwith as Dr. Johnson; Jill Tracy as Elaine; Meredith Roberts as Kathy the intern; Joe Rose as Troy; Martin Klebba as Randall Winston; Lindsay Ravange as Debbie (Slagathor); Tyler Poelle as Boon; Katie O'Rourke as Patty (Coffee Nurse); Randall Winston as Leonard; Christina Miles as Gloria; Bob Clendenin as Dr. Paul Zeltzer; Jay Kenneth Johnson as Dr. Matthews; Deonte Gordon as Mark The Orderly; Kathryn Joosten as Mrs. Tanner; Geoff Stevenson as Dr. Seymour Beardfacé; Taran Killam as Jimmy the Overly Touchy Orderly; Bob Bencomo as Dr. Coleman "Colonel Doctor" Slawski; Michael Hobert as Lonnie; Aseem Batra as Josephine; Manley Henry as Snoop Dogg Attending (Ronald); Matt Winston as Dr. Jeffrey Steadman; Phill Lewis as Hooch; Christa Miller as Jordan Sullivan; Eliza Coupe as Denise Mahoney; Sonal Shah as Sonja 'Sunny' Dey; Bill Lawrence as Custodian

Episode chronology
← Previous "My Chief Concern"	Next → "Our First Day of School"
- Scrubs season 8

"My Finale" is the 40-minute-long eighth season finale and 168th and 169th overall episodes of the American television sitcom Scrubs. It was originally broadcast as episodes 18 and 19 of season eight on May 6, 2009, on ABC, and was intended to be the series finale during production. However, while the episode was billed as the "Scrubs finale" at the time of airing, it was unknown whether this would be the series finale or the season finale. The show ended up returning for a ninth season, although the 2026 revival series retcons the events of it, instead picking up sixteen years after the end of season 8.

Since the show underwent many changes for the ninth season, this is the last episode in which all of the main cast appear as series regulars and the last appearance of Judy Reyes as Carla Espinosa. She returns in the 2026 reboot series.

== Plot ==
On the morning of his last day, J.D. lies in bed next to Elliot as he thinks back to his first day at Sacred Heart. Elliot reveals she has been "sneak moving in" by slowly replacing J.D.'s stuff with her own. At the hospital, Turk greets J.D. with a giant goodbye banner in front of the main entrance and a final "full-turbo spinning eagle" as his goodbye to his best friend. J.D. realizes Turk said goodbye too early and the moment will be ruined later so they decide to have intense hugs whenever they run into each other. Meanwhile, at the hospital's CoffeeBucks, Dr. Kelso tells Carla and Ted he wants to be a doctor again, albeit part-time, and he will not be hanging around Sacred Heart anymore. Kelso grabs his last free muffin and plans to steal a table from the CoffeeBucks.

J.D. hunts for Dr. Cox in the hope of receiving a heartfelt goodbye from his mentor. He finds Dr. Cox and gives him a homemade anthology of all his long-winded rants, each with a rating on how much they hurt J.D., numbered 1 to 5, with 5 being the times Cox made him cry. Even though J.D. steals a laugh from him, Dr. Cox refuses to give him the sentimental moment or show any emotion. Afterwards, the Janitor confronts J.D. with the penny that had started their ongoing feud (now on a necklace that he wears) as he tries to finally get J.D. to admit he put it in the door. Later, after forgetting a patient's illness and name, J.D. feels like a terrible doctor. His day goes from bad to worse when he finds out another patient will eventually die from Huntington's disease and that he has to tell her son that he might have inherited the disease too. The son disregards J.D.'s advice and does not want to get tested.

J.D. storms outside with Elliot for some air, distraught that nobody else wants to give him a heartfelt goodbye. Elliot points out the happy staffers yelling goodbye from the windows of the upper floors of the hospital. J.D. jumps at the chance to make a heartfelt yet clearly pre-rehearsed speech about his maturation at Sacred Heart, only to find that the goodbyes are meant for Dr. Kelso, who has taken his table and is finally leaving Sacred Heart a full year after his own retirement. Dr. Kelso reminds J.D. that no one ever really makes a big deal when someone leaves the hospital, but offers J.D. a handshake and proper farewell. This re-energizes J.D., determined to get his sentimental goodbye from Dr. Cox, who tells him this day is nothing special. J.D. tells him that if he is "gonna put that in the book, he should put that on the 5" and walks away.

Watching his terminal patient, J.D. sits with Carla, who defends him against Dr. Cox one last time as he walks by. J.D. asks her why she has always been so nice and never harassed him the way she does Dr. Cox. Carla reminds him that he is "Bambi" and she wanted to teach him. They have a tender moment as J.D. thanks her for teaching him, and they say how much they are going to miss each other.

Later in the cafeteria, Jordan says goodbye to J.D., reminiscing about when they had sex (S01Ep06), and then kisses him on the cheek before realizing with horror how nice she had just been. She then makes things right by insulting Ted, who allows her to because "[she] needs it". The Janitor attempts to demonstrate to J.D. how suddenly accusing someone will make them own up to what they did in a pre-rehearsed trick with the intern Denise, who walks off unfazed. Janitor tells J.D. one last time to admit putting the penny in the door, and J.D. finally cracks, saying that he did it, but it was eight years ago and an accident. The penny had fallen out of his pocket and rolled into the door, and J.D. had not owned up because it was his first day and he did not want Janitor to be mad at him so early on. When J.D. asks if Janitor believes him, he replies that he saw the incident happen and only asked J.D. back then if he was responsible as a test of character. J.D. had failed the test, starting the feud and missing out on a great friendship with the Janitor.

As he is preparing to leave, he sees Dr. Cox ranting at the intern Sunny. He finally relents, admitting to himself that Cox is gruff and insensitive, yet still a great teacher. He thanks Dr. Cox for everything, before moving on. Turk and Elliot both rush up to J.D. and apologize for saying their goodbyes too early, but he understands. He is glad that Elliot is moving in with him, she crazily blurts out that she has sublet her house and they now officially live together.

At the end of J.D.'s shift, the Janitor actually offers his goodbye to him. They wish each other luck and the Janitor reveals his name as Glenn Matthews; however, an orderly then calls him "Tommy", making it uncertain whether this is indeed his real name. (In a Twitter post on April 5, 2011, Bill Lawrence confirmed that Janitor was telling the truth when he revealed his name as Glenn Matthews.)

As he walks through the ICU for the final time, J.D. thinks of how he is lucky to have gotten what he has from the day, he says his goodbye to Dr. Cox before leaving. Sunny tells Dr. Cox how glad she is that J.D. is finally leaving. Dr. Cox replies that he considers J.D. a talented doctor, a good person, and a friend. J.D. (who had planned this in advance with Sunny) is secretly behind him and hears the whole thing, finally hugging a mortified Dr. Cox. Dr. Cox then erases the smile on Sunny's face by reminding her she will be at Sacred Heart for a long time.

J.D. then walks through the halls of Sacred Heart for the last time and, as he does, he sees visions of many of the people he has encountered over his eight years there. He sees his family, ex-girlfriends, former patients (both dead and alive) and co-workers before walking out the door for the last time. Upon leaving, he makes his final inner monologue about being able to shape his own unknown future. He visualizes a film of his future playing on the still hanging "Goodbye J.D." cloth, showing him marrying Elliot, having a child with her, sharing Christmas with Elliot, Turk, Carla, Dr. Cox, Jordan and all their children, his grown son Sam getting engaged to Turk's grown daughter, Isabella, and showing off to J.D. and Turk (and faints two times), him hugging everybody in those visions, and finally him getting an honest hug from Dr. Cox. This sequence is constructed in a musical montage style, and is accompanied by a Peter Gabriel cover of "The Book of Love", originally written by the Magnetic Fields. The cloth is torn down by an unfamiliar janitor (played by series creator Bill Lawrence) who says goodnight to him. With that, J.D. gets into his car and drives off. As he does, an ambulance drives past him, signifying that life in Sacred Heart goes on.

== Production ==
On his blog, writer Bill Lawrence admitted that the dialogue between J.D. and Elliot in bed at the beginning of the episode was lifted from the pilot of a previous show of his, Spin City. Also of note, the doctor who says "adios" to J.D. as he leaves the ICU in the final attempt for Dr. Cox to give JD a goodbye hug is Dr. Jonathan Doris, upon whom the show is loosely based.

== Cast ==
It was reported a week after filming in September 2008 that the finale of season 8 would feature a large cast of characters who had appeared throughout the show's eight-season run. Over fifty actors reprised their roles as patients, medical staff, and supporting players from prior episodes for the finale. Heather Graham was also invited to reprise her role as Dr. Molly Clock, but declined for personal reasons. Masi Oka, who played Franklyn the lab technician, was then appearing on Heroes, while Sarah Lancaster, who played Lisa the Gift-Shop Girl, was then appearing on Chuck; both were asked to appear but were denied permission by NBC.

== Music ==
- "Snow (Hey Oh)" by Red Hot Chili Peppers
- "The Book of Love" by The Magnetic Fields as performed by Peter Gabriel
- "Superman" by Lazlo Bane (acoustic instrumental)
- "Superman" by Lazlo Bane as performed by The Blanks
