= Scrubs season 7 =

Scrubs
- Season 7
- DVD cover
- Showrunner: Bill Lawrence
- No. of episodes: 11

Release
- Original network: NBC
- Original release: October 25, 2007 – May 8, 2008

Season chronology
- ← Previous; Season 6 Next → Season 8

The seventh season of the American comedy television series Scrubs premiered on NBC on October 25, 2007 and concluded on May 8, 2008 and consists of 11 episodes. This was the final season to air on NBC before it was picked up by ABC.

Season 7 was confirmed to have a reduced number of 18 episodes and was likely to be the final season. Due to the 2007–2008 Writers Guild of America strike, only 11 episodes were finished and six were completed before the strike; with four airing while the strike was on. During the strike, it was unknown if production on the final episodes would resume or that a possible series finale would air due to the actors' contracts expiring if the strike were to last a long time. After the strike was over, the final five episodes aired starting April 10, 2008. Episode 12, titled "My Commitment" was partially completed before the strike, but was never completed or aired. Some material shot for "My Commitment" was later used in the season 8 episode, "My Nah Nah Nah".

Season 7 continues to focus on the fact that J.D. has to grow up. He also has to deal with his newborn son, Sam. Both Elliot and J.D. deal with the fact that they may be with the wrong person (Keith and Kim). Turk tries to grow closer with Carla. Dr. Cox gets a temporary promotion. Dr. Kelso has to deal with the fact that the hospital has a mandatory retirement policy. Also, the Janitor starts dating Lady, who works at the hospital.

== Cast and characters ==
=== Main cast ===
- Zach Braff as Dr. John "J.D." Dorian
- Sarah Chalke as Dr. Elliot Reid
- Donald Faison as Dr. Chris Turk
- Neil Flynn as The Janitor
- Ken Jenkins as Dr. Bob Kelso
- John C. McGinley as Dr. Perry Cox
- Judy Reyes as Nurse Carla Espinosa

=== Recurring roles ===
- Sam Lloyd as Ted Buckland
- Robert Maschio as Dr. Todd Quinlan
- Christa Miller as Jordan Sullivan
- Johnny Kastl as Dr. Doug Murphy
- Travis Schuldt as Keith Dudemeister
- Aloma Wright as Nurse Shirley

=== Guest stars ===
- Elizabeth Banks as Dr. Kim Briggs
- Kit Pongetti as Ladinia "Lady" Williams
- Tom Cavanagh as Dan Dorian
- Michael McDonald as Mr. Cropper
- Mindy Sterling as Mrs. Cropper
- The Blanks as the Worthless Peons

== Production ==
=== Writing staff ===
- Bill Lawrence – executive producer/head writer
- Neil Goldman and Garrett Donovan – executive producers/assistant head writers
- Bill Callahan – executive producer/assistant head writer (episodes 1–6)
- Mike Schwartz – co-executive producer
- Debra Fordham – co-executive producer
- Mark Stegemann – co-executive producer
- Janae Bakken – co-executive producer
- Angela Nissel – supervising producer
- Kevin Biegel – executive story editor
- Aseem Batra – executive story editor
- Clarence Livingston – executive story editor
- Dave Tennant – story editor
- Andy Schwartz – story editor

=== Production staff ===
- Bill Lawrence – executive producer/showrunner
- Randall Winston – producer
- Liz Newman – producer
- Danny Rose – co-producer
- Abraham Park – associate producer

=== Directors ===
Includes directors who directed 2 or more episodes, or directors who are part of the cast and crew

- Bill Lawrence (2 episodes)
- Zach Braff (2 episodes)
- Michael McDonald (1 episode)

== Episodes ==
Scrubs season 7 episodes
No. overall	No. in season	Title	Directed by	Written by	Original release date	Prod. code	U.S. viewers (millions)
140	1	"My Own Worst Enemy"	Bill Lawrence	Neil Goldman & Garrett Donovan	October 25, 2007	701	6.95
After the events in the On-Call room, J.D and Elliot continue to question their respective commitments to Kim and Keith. Carla tells Turk that due to his diabetes, he can only have one candy bar every six months. Dr. Cox struggles to diagnose a patient. Meanwhile, Janitor may have a new girlfriend.
141	2	"My Hard Labor"	Adam Bernstein	Bill Callahan	November 1, 2007	702	6.58
J.D.'s pregnant girlfriend, Kim (Elizabeth Banks), goes into labor as they begin to question their strength as a couple and as potential parents. Meanwhile, the rest of Sacred Heart team also seem to be having parenting issues, with Cox wondering whether to give his daughter an injection, Turk and Carla attempting to complete a video game so that they can focus on Izzy, and Kelso helping his son Harrison through a breakup. Dr. Cox works with a new group of interns. Features a cameo appearance by Colin Hay.
142	3	"My Inconvenient Truth"	Bill Lawrence	Debra Fordham	November 8, 2007	703	6.27
When the Janitor watches An Inconvenient Truth, he decides to become an Environmental Officer at Sacred Heart (with peculiar motivational methods). J.D. must deal with an inconvenient truth of his own when Dan returns to town and tells him he has to grow up.
143	4	"My Identity Crisis"	Gail Mancuso	Dave Tennant	November 15, 2007	704	5.93
The Janitor learns that J.D. uses nicknames for people in the hospital whose names he does not know, and challenges him to learn the real names of everyone in the hospital, or take over as the Janitor for a day. Also, Dr. Cox's family is away, and he realizes that he is lonely without them. Carla fears that she is losing her Latina heritage.
144	5	"My Growing Pains"	Zach Braff	Mike Schwartz	November 29, 2007	705	5.91
J.D. tries to stop acting like a child while Turk tries to bring him back. Dr. Cox has an 11-year-old patient, Josh, with leukemia, and has to deal with the child's parents who want to keep the condition a secret from Josh. On Dr. Kelso's birthday, Elliot throws him a party, and finds out that Dr. Kelso is 65 years old. The hospital's board members find out about it and force him to retire. He asks for it to be kept a secret until they find a replacement.
145	6	"My Number One Doctor"	Will Mackenzie	Janae Bakken	December 6, 2007	706	4.85
Dr. Kelso signs the hospital up to RateYourDoc.org, a website where patients can evaluate their doctor's level of care online. Turk and Dr. Cox go to great lengths to get J.D. out of the number one spot on the website. Elliot must make a decision when she learns that one of her patients has intentionally overdosed on medication. Meanwhile, Carla cannot figure out what the Janitor's new girlfriend sees in him.
146	7	"My Bad Too"	Linda Mendoza	Clarence Livingston	April 10, 2008	707	6.58
It is the anniversary for Carla and Turk's first date and both work on getting each other the perfect gift. While Turk is excited as his gift is having learned Spanish, he soon realizes that being bilingual can only work to his advantage and is unsure whether to reveal the truth. Meanwhile, J.D. is torn about whether he should allow one of his patients, a burn victim, to attend his graduation and turns to Elliot for advice. Elsewhere, Dr. Cox decides to steal all of Dr. Kelso's food.
147	8	"My Manhood"	Michael McDonald	Angela Nissel	April 17, 2008	708	7.19
J.D. and Turk try to prove their masculinity. Janitor starts a hospital newspaper titled The Janitorial that irks Dr. Cox, and Turk's embarrassing secret is revealed. Meanwhile, Elliot discovers that as a result of her giving him a birthday party a few weeks ago, Kelso is about to lose his job.
148	9	"My Dumb Luck"	Rick Blue	Aseem Batra	April 24, 2008	710	5.39
Dr. Cox faces a problem diagnosing a patient, and JD and Turk's mistake leads to a result. Elliot and Carla try to convince the hospital board against forcing Dr. Kelso to retire by rallying the staff. They succeed, but Kelso chooses to leave on his own.
149	10	"My Waste of Time"	Chris Koch	Andy Schwartz	May 1, 2008	711	5.82
Elliot and J.D. seek out a former patient, and Dr. Cox is loving his new title. Meanwhile, the Janitor encourages Ted to be more assertive, but soon finds his own authority being challenged. Carla also approaches Turk about the idea of another baby.
150	11	"My Princess"	Zach Braff	Mark Stegemann	May 8, 2008	709	5.26
Dr. Cox narrates a day's work at the hospital to his son as a medieval fairy tale. J.D. takes the role of the village idiot, Elliot is a princess, Turk and Carla are a two-headed witch, and Dr. Kelso (still head of the hospital as the episode was supposed to be broadcast before "My Dumb Luck") is a demon.
