= My Screw Up =

- Scrubs episode
- Episode no.: Season 3 Episode 14
- Directed by: Chris Koch
- Written by: Neil Goldman; Garrett Donovan
- Production code: 315
- Original air date: February 24, 2004

Guest appearances
- Christa Miller as Jordan Sullivan; Brendan Fraser as Ben Sullivan; Tara Reid as Danni Sullivan; Sam Lloyd as Ted Buckland; Aloma Wright as Nurse Laverne Roberts; Randall Winston as Leonard; Ned Bellamy as Dr. Green; Frank Encarnacao as Dr. Walter Mickhead; Warren Munson as Mr. Taylor

Episode chronology
← Previous "My Porcelain God"	Next → "My Tormented Mentor"
- Scrubs season 3

"My Screw Up" is the 14th episode of the third season and the 60th episode overall of the American television sitcom Scrubs. Written by Neil Goldman and Garrett Donovan, and directed by Chris Koch, it originally aired on February 24, 2004 on NBC.

It features Brendan Fraser's final appearance as Ben Sullivan. The character had previously appeared in the first season episodes "My Occurrence" and "My Hero".

The episode received a positive critical reception. Most notably, the episode was nominated for the Primetime Emmy Award for Outstanding Writing in a Comedy Series.

== Plot ==
Jordan and Dr. Cox are preparing to throw a party for their son Jack's first birthday. Dr. Cox advises J.D. not to attend the party because Jordan's sister Danni, whom J.D. has recently broken up with, is also coming. Jordan and Danni's brother Ben (Brendan Fraser) comes back to visit after 2 years. Ben’s leukemia has gone into remission, but he has neglected to have routine screenings, and Cox advises him to get checked out.

Meanwhile, Turk and Carla argue over removing a mole from Turk's face and about Carla taking Turk's last name after they marry, and one of Ted's band members quits. Meanwhile, J.D. is taking care of an elderly man with an irregular heartbeat when Dr. Cox instructs him to run tests on Ben while Cox runs an errand. Twenty minutes later, J.D. is called to resuscitate a patient who has gone into cardiac arrest.

When Dr. Cox returns, J.D. hands him a chart and informs him that the patient died. Dr. Cox angrily blames J.D. and sends him home, despite Ben's efforts to convince Cox that it wasn't J.D.'s fault. Two days later, Cox has been at the hospital for sixty straight hours, and it is apparent that Jordan is worried that he won't show up for their big event later that day. Ben follows Cox around the hospital, apparently trying to convince him to go, but Cox claims that he's against attending "parties where the guest of honor has no idea of what's going on".

Meanwhile, Carla annoys everyone by seeking advice: first she is upset because she doesn't know how to repay Turk for having his mole removed—but when he asks her to agree to take his name (hoping she would say no so he wouldn't have to have the surgery), she gladly accepts his terms, but subsequently becomes angry that Turk is "forcing" her to take his name. She asks an annoyed Dr. Kelso for advice; he responds that she may end up missing the mole after it's gone, even though she thinks she hates it. She finally decides that Turk shouldn't have to have his mole removed, and Turk respects her wishes to keep her own last name.

Ben finally convinces Dr. Cox to leave the hospital to attend the event, and to apologize to J.D. for blaming him for the patient's death, also advising him to forgive himself. After Dr. Cox asks why Ben doesn't have his camera with him, J.D. arrives, bringing Cox to the realization that he isn't attending his son's birthday party, and that Ben isn't present. Cox and J.D. are revealed to be at a cemetery, where they are joined by Jordan, Danni, and many of the hospital staff for Ben's funeral. In reality, Ben was the patient who died under J.D.'s watch. Cox, unable to accept the death of his best friend, had been seeing Ben's spirit as if he were alive. The episode ends as a devastated Dr. Cox uncharacteristically allows those around to comfort him.

== Homage to The Sixth Sense ==
In the special features on the season 3 DVD, Bill Lawrence says that this episode is a homage to The Sixth Sense. The film, starring Bruce Willis, is famous for its twist ending, when it is revealed that Willis' character has been dead throughout the film. In the film, Willis interacts only with a boy who can "see dead people"; no other characters ever acknowledge Willis' presence. The film allows the audience to assume Willis is alive. Similarly, the audience in "My Screw Up" is led to believe that Ben is alive until the very end, even as close examination reveals that Dr. Cox is the only character who interacts with him after the point in the episode when he dies. Ben says early in the episode that he will take his camera with him everywhere until the day he dies. After "the patient" dies, Ben doesn't have his camera for the rest of the episode.

== Continuity ==
Footage from this episode was later re-used in "My Urologist", with Dr. Kim Briggs digitally worked into it (replacing Carla) to verify she was there for Ben's funeral.

Brendan Fraser was supposed to appear in "My Long Goodbye" as Ben, when Carla asked Dr. Cox if he had ever seen a ghost. However, Fraser couldn't appear because he was filming a movie. As such, Jill Tracy from "My Lunch" appears instead.

Ben had previously appeared in two Season 1 episodes: "My Occurrence" and "My Hero". It is in these two episodes that Ben was diagnosed with leukemia. In the former, J.D. himself goes through an incident similar to Dr. Cox's and imagines a series of events in which he proves Ben is misdiagnosed and actually well, before realizing it is a fantasy and Ben in fact has leukemia.

== Cultural references ==
- In the locker room where J.D. shows off his "Shower Shorts", on the locker behind him it says "Peace Sam". Sam is the name of J.D.'s father, played by John Ritter, who died September 11, 2003.
- Upon seeing Danni, Jordan's sister, played by Tara Reid, J.D. quickly mentions that he destroyed the video they made when she last visited. The video features Danni hitting J.D. in the crotch with a golf club, a mockery of many entries submitted to America's Funniest Home Videos. J.D. mentions sadly that now he'll never get to meet Bob Saget, even though Saget left the show in the mid 1990s.

== Reception ==
The episode received an Emmy nomination for Outstanding Writing in a Comedy Series.

In 2008, Empire placed Scrubs 19th on their list of "The 50 Greatest TV Shows of All Time" and cited "My Screw Up" as the show's best episode. In IGN's list of the 10 best Scrubs episodes, "My Screw Up" placed third. In 2024, Rolling Stone included My Screw Up on the list 100 Greatest TV Episodes of All Time, placing it 92.
