= Our First Day of School =

- Scrubs episode
- Episode no.: Season 9 Episode 1
- Directed by: Michael Spiller
- Written by: Bill Lawrence
- Production code: 901
- Original air date: December 1, 2009

Guest appearances
- Sarah Chalke as Dr. Elliot Reid; Ken Jenkins as Dr. Bob Kelso; Neil Flynn as Janitor; Robert Maschio as Dr. Todd Quinlan; Nicky Whelan as Maya; Walter Addison as Ben Coleman; Holly Kaplan as Patient; David Kobzantsev as Michael; John Billingsley as Alan

Episode chronology
← Previous "My Finale"	Next → "Our Drunk Friend"
- Scrubs season 9

"Our First Day of School" is the ninth season premiere and 170th overall episode of the American television sitcom Scrubs. Written by series creator Bill Lawrence and directed by Michael Spiller, it originally aired on ABC, on December 1, 2009. Set around 18 months after the eighth season's finale, it is the first episode of Scrubs following the show's new medical school setting while introducing several new main characters to the cast, with most of the previous main characters returning only to be featured in supportive or guest starring roles. Zach Braff, who played central character J.D., agreed to come back for 6 of this season's 13 episodes, and narrates this episode alongside Kerry Bishé, who plays new character and narrator Lucy Bennett.

This episode marks the final Scrubs appearance of The Janitor until "My Celebration". In 2026, the episode and the season as a whole was rendered non-canon by the revival of Scrubs, which picks up sixteen years after the events of the eighth season and "My Finale".

== Plot ==
The episode begins by introducing the changes made to the show; the former Sacred Heart Hospital has been torn down and a new one has been built on the campus of Winston University Medical School. J.D., Turk, Dr. Cox and Dr. Kelso have arrived to teach classes. Elliot Reid is now married to J.D. and expecting their first child. Meanwhile, three new medical students are introduced: Lucy Bennett, a self-conscious loner keen to make new friends; Cole Aaronson, an arrogant rich kid whose father funded the new hospital, and Drew Suffin, a 30-something med school dropout trying again after a decade away.

After getting off to a poor start with Denise, the new student adviser, and then being berated by Dr. Cox, Lucy grows discouraged. She sleeps with Cole, whom she met in class, to boost her self-esteem. However, Cole surreptitiously takes a nude photo of her when she gets out of bed, which he prints and accidentally drops on the university campus. J.D. sees the picture drop, but when he goes to pick it up the wind blows it along the ground, and J.D. gives chase - all the way to where Lucy happens to be sitting. After an awkward moment, the two talk briefly and Lucy asks J.D. for help with Dr. Cox. He tells her to stand up to Cox to show him she has courage. Lucy does just that - sort of - and begins to feel better about herself.

Meanwhile, Denise is adjusting to her new role as student adviser. She tries to convince Drew to take care of her responsibilities by telling him the other students "look up to him," but he rejects her suggestion and says he wants to "stay under the radar." Drew and Denise copulate soon after. The next day, Drew suggests to Dr. Cox that he shouldn't "pick on" the weakest students - meaning Lucy. Cox responds by saying he will instead focus all of his enmity at Drew, henceforth demanding high results from him and ordering him to wear a paper "#1" sign everywhere he goes.

== Production ==
=== Revamp ===
The eighth season of Scrubs was written to be the show's last. As such, the eighth season's finale, "My Finale", was written as a true ending for the show, depicting major events that would require the formula of the show to be changed for it to continue as a coherent television series. Thus when Bill Lawrence, the creator of Scrubs, agreed to produce an unexpected ninth season for ABC, he and the show's producers substantially revamped the show. This led to the show's new medical school setting replacing the hospital setting used in the entire previous eight-season run of the show, to the show focusing on students rather than doctors, and to most of the returning main characters becoming professors.

=== Filming ===
This is the first episode of Scrubs to be filmed on a set, rather than on location. The previous seasons were filmed at the North Hollywood Medical Center, an abandoned hospital. For the ninth season, filming moved to a sound stage at Culver Studios.

=== Music ===
The song "Guy Love" is used for the final time in the show's history in this episode. It had been heard in various incarnations several times throughout the show's run. It was originally written for the sixth season's "My Musical".

== Reception ==
The first episode of this newly revamped Scrubs was met with mostly positive reviews. The Chicago Sun-Times opined that "fresh blood adds vigor to [the show]", before concluding that "the new season looks promising" and awarding the show three and a half stars. Newsday agreed, saying "a change of scenery has done Scrubs a world of good... the new students are funny", before praising the performances of John C. McGinley and Donald Faison. TV Guide wrote that the show "has lost none of its endearing ability to mix earnest sentiment with sardonic gag-centric humor."

Entertainment Weekly criticised Lucy's character, writing "the writers need to get a fix on that character fast, or she won't be someone to root for", but did not dismiss the show. USA Today, however, called the new season "a deadly, deal-driven mistake that takes a network that has made great sitcom strides forward one unfortunate step back."
