= Scrubs season 2 =

Scrubs
- Season 2
- DVD cover
- Showrunner: Bill Lawrence
- No. of episodes: 22

Release
- Original network: NBC
- Original release: September 26, 2002 – April 17, 2003

Season chronology
- ← Previous; Season 1 Next → Season 3

The second season of the American comedy television series Scrubs premiered on NBC on September 26, 2002, and concluded on April 17, 2003, and consists of 22 episodes. For the second season Neil Flynn was promoted to main cast billing. Colin Hay guest starred for the first time. It is also the first time an episode gives the narration to another regular, in "His Story".

The show used a longer opening credits sequence for the first two episodes, moving through the ward rather than just two beds, including a shot of Flynn as The Janitor, showing the names of the series regulars, and ending with the chest X-ray showing the heart on the left side of the chest. However, the credits reverted to the original version in the third episode.

The second season focuses on J.D.'s (Zach Braff) second year practicing medicine at Sacred Heart, where he is now a resident. In the season opener, everyone is still in shock from the secrets Jordan Sullivan (Christa Miller) revealed about J.D., Turk, (Donald Faison), Carla (Judy Reyes), Elliot (Sarah Chalke), Dr. Cox (John C. McGinley), and Dr. Kelso (Ken Jenkins). As the season develops, J.D.'s older brother Dan (Tom Cavanagh) comes to visit, money issues affect J.D., Elliot, and Turk, Turk proposes to Carla, and Elliot finds a new boyfriend, a nurse named Paul Flowers (Rick Schroder). Dr. Cox resumes a sexual relationship with his ex-wife Jordan, with quite unexpected results.

== Cast and characters ==
=== Main cast ===
- Zach Braff as Dr. John "J.D." Dorian
- Sarah Chalke as Dr. Elliot Reid
- Donald Faison as Dr. Chris Turk
- Neil Flynn as Janitor, who was promoted from recurring cast billing from the first season.
- Ken Jenkins as Dr. Bob Kelso
- John C. McGinley as Dr. Perry Cox
- Judy Reyes as Nurse Carla Espinosa

=== Recurring roles ===
- Aloma Wright as Nurse Laverne Roberts
- Robert Maschio as Dr. Todd Quinlan
- Sam Lloyd as Ted Buckland
- Christa Miller as Jordan Sullivan
- Johnny Kastl as Dr. Doug Murphy
- Charles Chun as Dr. Phillip Wen

=== Guest stars ===
- Rick Schroder as Paul Flowers
- Amy Smart as Jamie Moyer
- Heather Locklear as Julie Keaton
- Masi Oka as Franklyn (MT)
- Tom Cavanagh as Dan Dorian
- D. L. Hughley as Kevin Turk
- Richard Kind as Harvey Corman
- Michael McDonald as Mike Davis
- Jay Mohr as Dr. Peter Fisher
- John Ritter as Sam Dorian
- Ryan Reynolds as Spence
- Alan Ruck as Mr. Bragin
- Dick Van Dyke as Dr. Doug Townshend
- The Blanks as the Worthless Peons

== Production ==
Tim Hobert was added as a consulting producer. Angela Nissel was hired as a staff writer for this season. April Pesa, the script coordinator, was given the chance to write an episode. Bonnie Sikotwiz (credited as Bonnine Schneider) & Hadley Davis, who Lawrence knew through Spin City, came into write an episode this season.

=== Writing staff ===
- Bill Lawrence – executive producer/head writer
- Eric Weinberg – co-executive producer
- Matt Tarses – co-executive producer
- Tim Hobert – consulting producer (episodes 1–13) / co-executive producer (episodes 14–22)
- Neil Goldman and Garrett Donovan – producers
- Gabrielle Allan – producer
- Mike Schwartz – executive story editor
- Debra Fordham – story editor
- Mark Stegemann – story editor
- Janae Bakken – story editor
- Angela Nissel – staff writer

=== Production staff ===
- Bill Lawrence – executive producer/showrunner
- Randall Winston – producer
- Liz Newman – co-producer
- Danny Rose – associate producer

=== Directors ===
Includes directors who directed 2 or more episodes, or directors who are part of the cast and crew

- Michael Spiller (4 episodes)
- Marc Buckland (3 episodes)
- Adam Bernstein (2 episodes)
- Lawrence Trilling (2 episodes)
- Chris Koch (2 episodes)
- Ken Whittingham (2 episodes)
- Will Mackenzie (2 episodes)
- Bill Lawrence (1 episode)

== Episodes ==
Scrubs (2001 TV series) season 2 episodes
No. overall	No. in season	Title	Directed by	Written by	Original release date	Prod. code	U.S. viewers (millions)
25	1	"My Overkill"	Adam Bernstein	Bill Lawrence	September 26, 2002	201	22.31
26	2	"My Nightingale"	Craig Zisk	Eric Weinberg	October 3, 2002	203	18.94
27	3	"My Case Study"	Michael Spiller	Gabrielle Allan	October 10, 2002	205	18.64
28	4	"My Big Mouth"	Paul Quinn	Mark Stegemann	October 17, 2002	206	17.78
29	5	"My New Coat"	Marc Buckland	Matt Tarses	October 24, 2002	202	14.11
30	6	"My Big Brother"	Michael Spiller	Tim Hobert	October 31, 2002	204	18.02
31	7	"My First Step"^{†}	Lawrence Trilling	Mike Schwartz	November 7, 2002	207	17.53
32	8	"My Fruit Cups"	Ken Whittingham	Janae Bakken	November 14, 2002	208	19.93
33	9	"My Lucky Day"	Lawrence Trilling	Debra Fordham	December 5, 2002	209	19.50
34	10	"My Monster"	Gail Mancuso	Angela Nissel	December 12, 2002	210	16.49
35	11	"My Sex Buddy"	Will Mackenzie	Neil Goldman & Garrett Donovan	January 2, 2003	212	12.81
36	12	"My New Old Friend"	Chris Koch	Gabrielle Allan	January 9, 2003	211	17.18
37	13	"My Philosophy"	Chris Koch	Story by : Bill Lawrence; Teleplay by : Matt Tarses & Tim Hobert	January 16, 2003	213	18.02
38	14	"My Brother, My Keeper"	Michael Spiller	Eric Weinberg	January 23, 2003	214	14.09
39	15	"His Story"^{†}	Ken Whittingham	Bonnie Schneider & Hadley Davis	January 30, 2003	215	17.25
40	16	"My Karma"	Marc Buckland	Janae Bakken & Debra Fordham	February 20, 2003	216	13.45
41	17	"My Own Private Practice Guy"	Marc Buckland	Angela Nissel & Mark Stegemann	March 13, 2003	218	15.64
42	18	"My T.C.W."	Adam Bernstein	Bill Lawrence	March 20, 2003	217	14.21
43	19	"My Kingdom"	Michael Spiller	April Pesa	March 27, 2003	219	13.56
44	20	"My Interpretation"	Will Mackenzie	Story by : Mike Schwartz; Teleplay by : Neil Goldman & Garrett Donovan	April 3, 2003	220	15.29
45	21	"My Drama Queen"	Michael Spiller	Will Berson	April 10, 2003	221	11.95
46	22	"My Dream Job"	Bill Lawrence	Tim Hobert & Matt Tarses	April 17, 2003	222	14.67

=== Notes ===
- ^{†} denotes a "supersized" episode, running an extended length of 25–28 minutes.
