= My Big Mouth =

My Big Mouth may refer to:

- "My Big Mouth", a song by Oasis from their 1997 album Be Here Now.
- "My Big Mouth" (Scrubs), an episode of Scrubs
