= Scrubs season 9 =

Season of television series

Scrubs
- Season 9
- DVD cover
- Showrunners: Bill Lawrence; Josh Bycel
- No. of episodes: 13

Release
- Original network: ABC
- Original release: December 1, 2009 – March 17, 2010

Season chronology
- ← Previous; Season 8 Next → Scrubs (2026)

The ninth season of the American comedy television series Scrubs (also known as Scrubs: Med School) premiered on ABC on December 1, 2009, and concluded on March 17, 2010, and consists of 13 episodes. This season marked a major change in the series: it takes place at a different location and only three of the seven main characters from the first eight seasons remained as regular main characters. The rest of the cast is made up of new recruits, including Lucy, played by Kerry Bishé, who is also the show's new narrator. Former star Zach Braff returned for six episodes of the season.

The new season focuses on students at a med school at the fictional Winston University, rather than interns at a hospital. Doctors Perry Cox and Christopher Turk, played by John C. McGinley and Donald Faison respectively, returned as teachers. The show's filming location moved from the North Hollywood Medical Center to sets at Culver Studios. The series takes place at the new Sacred Heart Hospital, located on the Winston University campus.

The season takes place over a year after the events of the last episode of the eighth season, "My Finale", which was expected to be the last episode and ended many of the series' long-running storylines. However, Bill Lawrence was approached concerning more episodes, and as a result, the show entered its ninth season.

Review aggregator Metacritic found critical reception to the new format to be "generally positive" and assigned an average score of 64/100, though reviews were varied, with the Chicago Sun Times calling the season "promising", but USA Today dismissing it as a "deal-driven mistake". The season nonetheless saw Scrubs receive its lowest-ever ratings, with an average of 3.79 million tuning in, down from 5.61 million the previous season (though the show's overall ranking had improved).

Zach Braff announced on March 22, 2010, via Facebook that it appeared that Scrubs would not be renewed for a tenth season, and on May 14, 2010, ABC officially cancelled the series.

On July 10, 2025, ABC revived Scrubs for a revival series with Braff, Faison, and Chalke returning as series regulars and Lawrence returning as an executive producer; the revival would then render the ninth season non-canon, ignoring the demolition of Sacred Heart Hospital in season 9, and picking up with J.D. returning to the hospital years after the eighth season finale.

== Background ==
The eighth season was expected to be the last for Scrubs, but in May 2009, ABC announced that the series had been renewed for an additional 13 episodes. John C. McGinley and Donald Faison signed one-year deals and were the only cast members to stay on as regulars. Zach Braff appeared in six episodes, in which he was billed as main cast, to assist in transitioning the show, while Sarah Chalke signed on to guest star in four episodes throughout the season. Ken Jenkins appeared in nine episodes, and Neil Flynn, who was also busy with his new show The Middle, appeared in a single scene in the season's first episode. Judy Reyes was the only original cast member to not return, after declining to appear in a recurring guest role as she only wanted to return full-time. Eliza Coupe, who portrayed Denise Mahoney beginning in season eight, became a series regular, along with new cast members Kerry Bishé, Michael Mosley and Dave Franco.

Lawrence considered the eighth season to be the end of the show for Scrubs, going so far as to ask ABC if he could change the name to Scrubs Med. ABC declined, but Lawrence still advised fans to treat it as a new show, even putting a caption under the "Created By" on the X-ray in the opening sequence saying [Med School]: continuing from this, Lawrence would then render the ninth season non-canon in his revival of Scrubs.

== Cast and characters ==
=== Main cast ===
- Zach Braff as Dr. John "J.D." Dorian
- Donald Faison as Dr. Chris Turk
- John C. McGinley as Dr. Perry Cox
- Eliza Coupe as Dr. Denise Mahoney
- Kerry Bishé as Lucy Bennett
- Michael Mosley as Drew Suffin
- Dave Franco as Cole Aaronson

=== Recurring roles ===
- Ken Jenkins as Dr. Bob Kelso
- Nicky Whelan as Maya
- Robert Maschio as Dr. Todd Quinlan
- Windell Middlebrooks as Captain Melvis Duncook
- Matthew Moy as Trang
- Steven Cragg as Lieutenant Frank Underhill
- Sarah Chalke as Dr. Elliot Reid

=== Guest stars ===
- Neil Flynn as The Janitor
- Sam Lloyd as Ted Buckland
- The Blanks as the Worthless Peons
- Kate Micucci as Stephanie Gooch
- Christa Miller as Jordan Sullivan
- Sonal Shah as Dr. Sonja "Sunny" Dey

== Production ==
Show creator Bill Lawrence wanted to change the name of the show to Scrubs Med, but ABC did not allow this. The setting shifted from the original hospital building to a new Sacred Heart medical school and university campus, with shooting locations moving to Culver Studios. Executive producers Neil Goldman and Garrett Donovan, and Bill Callahan departed from the series and were replaced by Jonathan Groff, Zach Braff, and Josh Bycel, who also served as the co-showrunner, alongside creator/executive producer Bill Lawrence who was doing double duty at the time with both Scrubs and his new show Cougar Town.

Every writer from previous seasons departed from the show with the exception of Lawrence and Andy Schwartz. Sean Russell returned to write a freelance episode, just as he had done previously in season 6.

=== Writing staff ===
- Bill Lawrence – executive producer/co-head writer
- Josh Bycel – executive producer/co-head writer
- Corey Nickerson – supervising producer
- Kevin Etten – supervising producer
- Jonathan Groff – executive producer (episodes 1–4, 6) / consulting producer (episodes 5, 8–13)
- Steven Cragg & Brian Bradley – consulting producers
- David Walpert – consulting producer (episodes 5, 8–13)
- Prentice Penny – co-producer
- Andy Schwartz – executive story editor
- Leila Strachan – staff writer
- Lon Zimmet & Dan Rubin – staff writers

=== Production staff ===
- Bill Lawrence – executive producer/co-showrunner
- Josh Bycel – executive producer/co-showrunner
- Zach Braff – executive producer
- Randall Winston – co-executive producer
- Liz Newman – producer
- Danny Rose – co-producer

=== Directors ===
Includes directors who directed 2 or more episodes, or directors who are part of the cast and crew

- Michael Spiller (3 episodes)
- John Putch (2 episodes)
- Michael McDonald (2 episodes)
- Rick Blue (editor) (1 episode)

== Episodes ==
Scrubs season 9 episodes
No. overall	No. in season	Title	Directed by	Written by	Original release date	Prod. code	U.S. viewers (millions)
170	1	"Our First Day of School"	Michael Spiller	Bill Lawrence	December 1, 2009	901	4.63
Set one year after the finale of Season 8; J.D., Turk, Cox, Kelso and resident Denise return to Sacred Heart to teach med school while new med students Lucy, Drew and Cole are put through the wringer on their first day of school.
171	2	"Our Drunk Friend"	Michael McDonald	Josh Bycel & Jonathan Groff	December 1, 2009	902	4.43
Lucy learns a hard lesson about what it takes to be a doctor after trying to save an alcoholic patient from his addiction. Meanwhile J.D. and Turk spot a potential love connection between Denise and the new med student Drew, as they play matchmakers with a little bit of help from Dr. Kelso.
172	3	"Our Role Models"	Gail Mancuso	Steven Cragg & Brian Bradley	December 8, 2009	903	5.44
J.D. and Drew learn a tough lesson in mentoring when Dr. Cox and Lucy show them that sometimes the student is the teacher. Meanwhile, Lucy decides to shadow Denise despite Denise's protests.
173	4	"Our Histories"	Ken Whittingham	Corey Nickerson	December 15, 2009	904	4.22
J.D. and Turk show up in costume at a med student's party which is not a fancy dress party. Meanwhile, Kelso bids a fond farewell to Ted and Gooch. Also, if Cole, Lucy, Drew and the gang want to go to the med student party, they must first complete 'final interview' on four patients, including a dying ex-soldier. Final Scrubs appearance of: Sam Lloyd as Ted.
174	5	"Our Mysteries"	Michael Spiller	Steven Cragg & Brian Bradley	December 22, 2009	909	3.43
J.D. still clamors for Dr. Cox's approval as he approaches his final day of teaching at Sacred Heart, Lucy searches within herself for the courage to perform a basic medical procedure (drawing blood) on a real human, and Denise and Drew make things official.
175	6	"Our New Girl-Bro"	Michael McDonald	Kevin Etten	January 1, 2010	906	3.06
While Turk struggles to find a replacement best friend, a very pregnant Elliot offers advice and guidance to an over-worked and exhausted Lucy. Also, Cole finds out he could fail med school.
176	7	"Our White Coats"	John Putch	Andy Schwartz	January 5, 2010	907	3.81
Before receiving their white coats, the med students of Winston University must figure out why they want to be doctors, and Lucy struggles with her answer. Denise gets a little relationship help from Elliot. Also, Cole reveals a secret Drew has been hiding.
177	8	"Our Couples"	Chris Koch	Prentice Penny	January 5, 2010	908	3.05
Lucy finds couplings, dysfunctional and good, throughout the hospital. Meanwhile, Turk is angered after Perry makes him operate against his own judgement and the patient dies.
178	9	"Our Stuff Gets Real"	John Putch	Leila Strachan	January 12, 2010	905	2.72
The reality of having a baby begins to settle in for both J.D. and Elliot while Lucy struggles with the reality of operating on people. Also, Perry doesn't know if he's ready to sign a will.
179	10	"Our True Lies"	Michael Spiller	Lon Zimmet & Dan Rubin	January 19, 2010	910	3.04
A student cheats on an exam leaving a cheat sheet in the toilets. Dr. Cox takes it out on the five students who briefly left the exam room detaining them indefinitely till someone confesses. Cole eventually confesses to save Lucy the humiliation, but she owns up to the group, who then cover for her. They all re-sit a new exam. Meanwhile, Drew reveals he is married (but estranged from his wife) and Denise makes a startling admission of her own.
180	11	"Our Dear Leaders"	Peter Lauer	Corey Nickerson & Kevin Etten	January 26, 2010	911	3.17
Lucy takes her new assignment as hell week "team leader" a bit too seriously. Perry challenges Drew to stay away from his friends who arguably rely on him too much, and Dr. Turk feels threatened when an internationally renowned surgeon pays a visit. Eventually Drew steps in to save the study group and Turk accepts he can learn from the visiting surgeon.
181	12	"Our Driving Issues"	Eren Celeboglu	Alessia Costantini & Prentice Penny	March 10, 2010	912	4.28
Cole is told he has a malignant mole. Kelso gets negative results back after a few routine tests, he learns the hard way to put his ego in check. Meanwhile, Denise and Perry put Drew in the middle of their fight. Final Scrubs appearance of: Ken Jenkins as Kelso.
182	13	"Our Thanks"	Rick Blue	Sean Russell	March 17, 2010	913	3.45
The med students at Winston University finally find something to be thankful for when Cole identifies his true calling in surgery, but he annoys Turk by shadowing him. Meanwhile, Drew realizes who the love of his life is after Denise decides to move in. Lucy finds the inspiration to become a doctor, after a former patient's son comes to say his final words to his deceased father.
