= List of Scrubs characters =

The following is a list of characters from the NBC/ABC American comedy-drama Scrubs that aired from 2001 to 2010 and the 2026 revival series.

== Character appearance summary ==
Main cast (credited)
Recurring cast (4+)
Guest cast (1–3)

Scrubs cast and characters
Character	Portrayed by	Scrubs (2001) seasons									Scrubs (2026) seasons	
Character	Portrayed by	1	2	3	4	5	6	7	8	9	1	2
John "J.D." Dorian, M.D.	Zach Braff	Main (Note: In season 9, Braff is only credited in the episodes he appeared.)	Main	Main	Main	Main	Main	Main	Main	Main	Main	Main
Elliot Reid, M.D.	Sarah Chalke	Main	Main	Main	Main	Main	Main	Main	Main	Recurring (Note: Sarah Chalke is credited as a special guest star.)	Main	Main
Christopher Turk, M.D.	Donald Faison	Main	Main	Main	Main	Main	Main	Main	Main	Main	Main	Main
Robert "Bob" Kelso, M.D.	Ken Jenkins	Main	Main	Main	Main	Main	Main	Main	Main	Recurring (Note: Ken Jenkins is credited as a special guest star.)		
Percival "Perry" Cox, M.D.	John C. McGinley	Main	Main	Main	Main	Main	Main	Main	Main	Main	Guest (Note: John C. McGinley is credited as a special guest star.)	Guest
Carla Espinosa, RN	Judy Reyes	Main	Main	Main	Main	Main	Main	Main	Main		Guest (Note: Judy Reyes is credited as a special guest star.)	Guest
"Janitor"	Neil Flynn	Recurring	Main	Main	Main	Main	Main	Main	Main	Guest (Note: Neil Flynn is credited as a special guest star in Season 10.)	Guest	Recurring
Denise Mahoney, M.D.	Eliza Coupe								Recurring	Main		
Lucy Bennett	Kerry Bishé									Main		
Drew Suffin	Michael Mosley									Main		
Cole Aaronson	Dave Franco									Main		
Sam Tosh	Ava Bunn										Recurring	Main

== Main characters ==
=== John Dorian (J.D.) ===
Zach Braff portrays Dr. John Michael "J.D." Dorian, the show's original protagonist and narrator. J.D. begins the series as a staff intern, progressing to resident, then to attending physician, and eventually chief of medicine. His voice-over to the series comes from his internal thoughts and often features surreal fantasies. J.D. is a recurring character in Season 9, though he is still considered to be the protagonist of the episodes in which he appeared. Braff received top billing as a main cast member in each of his appearances for that season. He did not appear in the last episode of the series, titled "Our Thanks", and no mention was made of him. In the revival series, when J.D., now a concierge doctor, visits a patient of his at Sacred Heart, he accepts Dr. Cox's offer to replace him as chief of medicine. J.D. and Elliot marry toward the end of season 8, and are divorced in the revival series. J.D. has two sons, Sam, with his ex-girlfriend, Kim, and Ollie, with Elliot.

J.D.'s name is based on that of Dr. Jonathan Doris, a college friend of series creator Bill Lawrence. Doris served as medical adviser to the show.

=== Christopher Turk ===
Donald Faison portrays Christopher Duncan Turk, J.D.'s best friend, a surgical attending physician and later chief of surgery. Turk roomed with J.D. in college and medical school, and the two have an extremely close relationship, described in the Season 6 episode "My Musical" as "guy love". Over the first three seasons, he quickly starts a relationship with and ultimately marries Carla Espinosa. J.D. claims that Turk's middle name is derived from his father's love of donuts.

Turk and J.D. both attended The College of William and Mary, Scrubs creator Bill Lawrence's alma mater. They share a goofy sense of humor. For example, they both enjoy dancing "the robot"; "dramatic slow running"; pretending to be a "multiethnic Siamese doctor"; and pretending to be the "world's most giant doctor".

They own a stuffed yellow Labrador Retriever named Rowdy, which they treat like a live dog. J.D. was Turk's best man and is the godfather of Carla's and his child, Izzy. In the revival series, Turk and Carla have three additional daughters.

Turk's name is based on that of real-life physician Jon Turk, a medical consultant for Scrubs.

=== Perry Cox ===
John C. McGinley portrays Percival "Perry" Ulysses Cox, a senior attending physician at Sacred Heart, the hospital's residency director, and eventually chief of medicine in Season 8 ("My Cookie Pants"). J.D. considers Cox his mentor despite the fact that Cox routinely criticizes and belittles him. Cox frequently suggests that this harsh treatment is intended as conditioning for the rigors of hospital life.

Dr. Cox is sarcastic and bitter, with a quick, cruel wit, normally expressed through frequent and sometimes incredibly long rants in which he viciously attacks almost every character on the show. He is athletic, often found playing basketball in the hospital's parking lot with younger employees. In "My Friend the Doctor", he shows off by slam-dunking a basketball, but injures his back when he lands, a reminder that he is middle-aged. Out of vanity, he tries to disguise his injury. His parents were an absent or abusive mother and an alcoholic, abusive father, which may have sculpted his narcissistic personality and poor social skills.

McGinley says in the Season 1 DVD bonus features that Dr. Cox's habit of touching his nose is a homage to Paul Newman's character in The Sting, although Cox also uses it as a sign of irritation on occasion, rather than just a sign that "it's going to be OK", as it was used in the film. Dr. Cox has also been compared to Gregory House (although Cox's character was created several years before House's) by Dr. Kelso, who says, "Oh Perry, you are so edgy and cantankerous, like House without the limp." This is further explored in "My House", during which Cox acquires a temporary limp. At the end of the episode, through a series of circumstances, Dr. Cox walks into a room where the other characters are sitting and, in a very House-esque way, gives them the answers to everything they have been trying to figure out in the episode. In the revival series, Dr. Cox retires and appoints J.D. as his successor as chief of medicine. Months later he returns to the hospital and finds out that he has an autoimmune disease.

=== Elliot Reid ===
Sarah Chalke portrays Elliot Reid, another intern and later private-practice physician. Her relationship with J.D. becomes romantic on several occasions, and at the end of Season 8, she marries J.D.. Between "My Finale" and the revival series, Elliot gets divorced from J.D., and are now co-parenting their son, Ollie together. Elliot is driven by a neurotic desire to prove her abilities to her family (in which all of the men are doctors), her peers, and herself. Being the byproduct of a wealthy family, Elliot was largely unprepared for the "real world" hostilities and socioeconomic differences among the hospital staff. Elliot has an estranged relationship with both of her parents, particularly her mother, who often belittles and demeans her. Elliot has a habit of speaking in a high pitched voice when she becomes irritated or feels ignored.

At Sacred Heart, Elliot begins as an intern and later becomes a resident after a grueling year-long internship. She serves as co-chief resident with J.D. during Season 4. At the end of that season, she briefly leaves to take an endocrinology fellowship, which ends five days later after her research partner finds the cure to osteogenesis imperfecta, the disease they are researching. After a brief spell at a free clinic, she returns to Sacred Heart and becomes a senior attending physician. At the end of the episode "My Coffee", she accepts an offer to go into private practice, allowing her to receive double the pay, still work at Sacred Heart, and never have to deal with superiors Dr. Cox (McGinley) or Dr. Kelso (Ken Jenkins) again. In "My Full Moon", she ponders her future career after struggling to deliver the bad news to a patient diagnosed with H.I.V. She tells Turk that if she were lucky enough to marry and have enough money to stop working, she would "walk out of this place and never look back".

=== Carla Espinosa ===
Judy Reyes portrays Carla Espinosa, the hospital's head nurse, who acts as a mother figure to the interns, often hiding their mistakes from their attending doctor. During the course of the series, Turk forms a relationship with Carla; eventually, they marry and start a family together.

Carla starts dating Turk (Faison) in the show's second episode, "My Mentor". They remain together for almost the entire run of the show. Carla marries Turk in the finale of Season 3, "My Best Friend's Wedding". She and Turk go through a trial separation in Season 4 after Carla discovers that Turk is still talking to his ex-girlfriend without telling her he is married, a separation that is prolonged after Carla and J.D. kiss. After couples' therapy and some frank discussions with each other and J.D., Turk and Carla reunite and immediately begin trying to conceive. Initially, they are unsuccessful, but Carla finally gets pregnant toward the end of the season after several episodes in which she and Turk worry about their respective fertility. Carla gives birth to a baby girl, whom they name Isabella, in the episode "My Best Friend's Baby's Baby and My Baby's Baby". J.D. becomes the godfather to the child. In "My House", she is revealed to suffer from postpartum depression. She spends most of the following episode in denial about the condition, but finally gets help after a frank discussion with Jordan Sullivan, who also suffered from the condition. Carla and Turk go on to have three more children. In the revival series, Carla is dealing with menopause.

=== Robert Kelso ===
Ken Jenkins portrays Robert "Bob" Kelso, Sacred Heart's chief of medicine for most of the series. Kelso is portrayed as cold, heartless, and cruel, driven primarily by the hospital's bottom line rather than the well-being of patients. However, he is occasionally suggested to have a softer side, with his cruelty being a means of coping with years of hard decisions. Other characters have noted that he is burdened by the job. He often alludes to having a wife named Enid and a homosexual son named Harrison, although neither is ever seen. He retires in Season 7, after which his relationship with staff at the hospital improves. Toward the end of Season 8, he realizes he misses being a doctor.

In Season 9 (rendered non-canon by the revival series), he returns to Sacred Heart as a professor following his wife's death.

Throughout the series, he is at odds with Dr. Cox, Sacred Heart's chief attending physician, who eventually replaces him as chief of medicine. Cox calls him "Bobbo" or similar variations, often refers to him as a "pod person" or "the Devil himself", and even punches him in the episode "My Dream Job". The two occasionally share moments of understanding and compassion, however, such as when Kelso tells a depressed Cox that the hospital and Kelso himself need him, as they balance each other out to do what is best for the hospital. After his retirement, Kelso becomes more openly friendly with Dr Cox.

=== Janitor ===
Janitor
- Scrubs / Clone High character
- First appearance: "My First Day" (2001)
- Created by: Bill Lawrence
- Portrayed by: Neil Flynn
- Voiced by: Neil Flynn (Clone High)

In-universe information
- Gender: Male
- Occupation: Janitor at Sacred Heart hospital and Clone High High School
- Spouses: Lady Williams
- Children: Maintenance Guy

Neil Flynn portrays the hospital's custodian known as "Janitor" through most of the series. An incident in the pilot episode establishes an adversarial relationship between J.D. and him, which persists throughout the series. This tends to take the form of the Janitor pulling mean-spirited pranks on J.D., although he gives J.D. a pass after J.D.'s father Sam dies. In the last episode of Season 8, the Janitor reveals his name to J.D. as "Glen Matthews", referencing his cameo role In Clone High.

In the Season 9 premiere (rendered non-canon by the revival series), Turk tells J.D. that the day after he left Sacred Heart, the Janitor asked when J.D. was returning, either oblivious to, or in denial of, J.D.'s departure, and upon coming to the realization that J.D. no longer worked at Sacred Heart, promptly walked off the job and quit.

He returns in the revival series, and his son is now the Maintenance Guy at Sacred Heart. His son gets along with J.D. until his father accuses J.D. of thinking he was hired due to nepotism.

Flynn also voices Janitor in a 2003 episode of Clone High, serving as the school janitor of Clone High High School and the foster father of Ponce. He is credited as "Glen the Janitor", which was ultimately revealed as his real name in Scrubs. Flynn returned to voice Janitor in the 2023 revival of Clone High.

=== Denise Mahoney ===
Denise Mahoney
- Scrubs character
- First appearance: "My Jerks" (2009)
- Last appearance: "Our Thanks" (2010) (Note: In 2026, this episode was rendered non-canon along with the rest of the ninth season. Denise Mahoney's last canonical appearance is in "My Finale")
- Created by: Bill Lawrence
- Portrayed by: Eliza Coupe

In-universe information
- Nickname: Jo (by JD)
- Gender: Female
- Occupation: Intern
- Significant other: Drew Sufflin
- Nationality: American

Eliza Coupe portrays Denise "Jo" Mahoney, one of several new interns in Season 8. She is blunt, opinionated, and unable to connect strongly to her emotions, even when with her family. She becomes J.D.'s protégée and takes steps to learn how to empathize with patients. In season nine (rendered non-canon by the revival series), Denise is elevated to a main cast role as a teaching assistant at the new Sacred Heart. She also develops a romantic relationship with Drew Suffin, a medical student.

=== Lucy Bennett ===
Lucy Bennett
- Scrubs character
- First appearance: "Our First Day of School" (2009)
- Last appearance: "Our Thanks" (2010)
- Created by: Bill Lawrence
- Portrayed by: Kerry Bishé

In-universe information
- Gender: Female
- Occupation: Med student
- Nationality: American

Kerry Bishé portrays Lucy Bennett, a medical student at Winston University. She serves as the new narrator for Season 9, showing a penchant for fantastical fantasies, much like J.D., while having self-esteem issues and several personality "quirks", similar to Elliot. She loves horses and believes "if they could talk, they would be wise".

Lucy is at first overwhelmed by life in a hospital, especially when both her chief professor, Dr. Cox, and her student advisor, Denise Mahoney (Eliza Coupe), take an immediate dislike to her. Seeking a respite, she sleeps with her classmate Cole Aaronson (Dave Franco), an arrogant rich kid who takes a naked picture of her without her knowledge and then humiliates her by letting it fall out of his backpack and into the wrong hands. At the end of the episode, she befriends J.D., who is temporarily teaching at the university; he takes her under his wing and encourages her to stand up to Dr. Cox.

She continues an affair with Cole, who she says "[kills] her soul as he climbs into bed" with her. Later on, she starts to accept Cole and admits to her class that she loves him. Throughout the series, she often goes out of her way to seek acceptance, baking cupcakes, sharing class notes, and trying to bond with fellow students. When Cole wants to become a surgeon, he tears up 17 of Lucy's cuddly horses and tries to re-assemble them. Lucy holds 17 individual funerals for them that Drew has to suffer through.

As the season progresses, Lucy faces more and greater challenges in medicine and life. In "Our Drunk Friend", she personally raises money to send an alcoholic patient to rehab, only to have it blow up in her face when he falls off the wagon. J.D., who had initially seemed to support her, tells her that he knew the patient was a lost cause, but felt that she needed to learn how to cope with defeat.

=== Drew Suffin ===
Drew Suffin
- Scrubs character
- First appearance: "Our First Day of School" (2009)
- Last appearance: "Our Thanks" (2010)
- Created by: Bill Lawrence
- Portrayed by: Michael Mosley

In-universe information
- Gender: Male
- Occupation: Med student
- Nationality: American

Michael Mosley portrays Drew Suffin, who is a medical student at Winston University giving it a second go. He had previously been in jail and was apparently shot by a 12-year-old. He describes jail as "cold". He is in a relationship with Denise. He is apparently Dr. Cox's favorite student; at one point, Cox forces him to tape a "#1" sign to his chest, which is shortly replaced by a pink T-shirt saying "#1". He later stops wearing either, though Cox still shows him signs of favoritism (he even pats Drew's back, to J.D.'s dismay). Drew disappoints Dr. Cox after Cox shows him off to Turk in the series finale, "Our Thanks", saying that his new protégé is the opposite of J.D. Drew then turns to Dr. Cox and asks for relationship advice. Dr. Cox replies, "Oh dear God, Drew, not you. It's happening again."

=== Cole Aaronson ===
Cole Aaronson
- Scrubs character
- First appearance: "Our First Day of School" (2009)
- Last appearance: "Our Thanks" (2010)
- Created by: Bill Lawrence
- Portrayed by: Dave Franco

In-universe information
- Gender: Male
- Occupation: Med student
- Nationality: American

Dave Franco portrays Cole Aaronson, a medical student at Winston University. His family donated a large sum of money to get the new Sacred Heart Hospital built, and as such, Cole believes he is "untouchable" and can do whatever he wants. While spoiled, arrogant, and immature, he occasionally reveals himself to have a good heart. He is in a relationship with Lucy for a time, but after he is diagnosed with melanoma, he takes his frustrations out on her, causing her to leave him. He then confides in Dr. Kelso, who gives him some much-needed advice that brings Lucy back to him. His melanoma goes into remission in the series finale, and Cole decides to become a surgeon and follow Dr. Turk. By the end of the finale, Turk gives up trying to scare Cole away and accepts him as a kind of protégé.

=== Sam Tosh ===
Dr. Sam Tosh
- First appearance: "My Return" (2026)
- Created by: Aseem Batra; Tim Hobert
- Portrayed by: Ava Bunn

In-universe information
- Nicknames: TikTok Doc, Dr. Selfie
- Gender: Female
- Title: Intern
- Occupation: Doctor of internal medicine

Dr. Samantha "Sam" Tosh, played by Ava Bunn, is a medical intern at Sacred Heart introduced in season 1 of the revival series. She is also an influencer which she uses the money she earns to help pay off her school loans. She often uses social media to solve medical problems which Elliot doesn't agree with at first. After Sam has shown concern for Asher's problems at word and his situation with Amara throughout the entire season, in the season 1 finale, "My Celebration", she confesses to him that she has a crush on him, and they kiss.

== Recurring characters ==
=== Todd Quinlan ===
Dr. Todd Quinlan
- Scrubs character
- First appearance: "My First Day" (2001)
- Created by: Bill Lawrence
- Portrayed by: Robert Maschio

In-universe information
- Gender: Male
- Occupation: Surgeon
- Nationality: American

Dr. Todd Quinlan (often called "The Todd"), played by Robert Maschio, is a surgeon at Sacred Heart known for his rampant sexual innuendo and sexual harassment of women. Despite his frat-boy personality and his depiction as absent-minded and unintelligent, Todd is a skilled surgeon: the hospital's best surgical intern and second-best surgical resident. He is Turk's friend, and even believes that he, rather than J.D., is Turk's best friend, and that Turk would choose him over Carla if confronted with that choice. Todd's surname was not revealed until Season 5. In the Season 1 DVD commentaries, Bill Lawrence said this was deliberate.

Although Todd is often shown speaking to women in a way that constitutes sexual harassment, in "My Lucky Charm", he states, "The Todd appreciates hot regardless of gender." He pretends to be gay in "My Lunch", believing that "chicks dig gay dudes." In "My Office", after talking with Dr. Molly Clock, he explains that his view of women originates from an unhealthy relationship with his mother with whom he once had a brief incestuous experience. However, it is revealed in "My Tormented Mentor" that Todd's father also influenced him to look at women as sexual objects. It was implied that Todd made such comments only to maintain an image. He shows sensitivity and compassion for friends and people around him, going out of his way to protect Turk and even notices that Turk is upset in "Their Story".

Throughout the series, Todd often refers to himself in the third person and gives a variety of high fives, hard enough that they hurt. He often devises names for these variations of high fives by taking a word or subject that references a previous comment or gesture, and adding "five" to it for example, "moving-on five" or "something-might-be-wrong five", normally accompanied by a sound effect. He is a member of the Janitor's second Brain Trust, along with Ted and Doug. In "My Soul On Fire, Part 1", it is revealed that Todd went to medical school in the Bahamas and learned the high five from his professor. In "My Chief Concern", he appears to be involved in a three-way sexual relationship with the Hendersons, a married couple. Although Todd maintains a steady role through much of the series, he appears only twice in "My Finale": When J.D. runs out of the hospital and when J.D. leaves for the final time, at which point Todd gives him a "goodbye five from the big dog". Todd is a recurring character in Season 9 and 10.

=== Ted Buckland ===
Ted Buckland
- Scrubs / Cougar Town character
- First appearance: "My First Day"; Scrubs; October 2, 2001
- Last appearance: "A One Story Town"; Cougar Town; March 13, 2012
- Created by: Bill Lawrence
- Portrayed by: Sam Lloyd

In-universe information
- Gender: Male
- Occupation: Lawyer
- Significant other: Stephanie Gooch
- Nationality: American

Theodore Buckland Jr., played by Sam Lloyd, is Sacred Heart's lawyer, initially credited as an unnamed "Lawyer" until the Season 1 episode "My Blind Date", where he reminds Dr. Kelso of his name. As the hospital's "sad sack", he has pathetically low self-esteem and frequent suicidal tendencies. It is implied that Ted has never won a case. It took him five tries to pass the bar exam because of stress-induced dyslexia; he has also stated that he took the exam in Alaska, where it was much easier to pass. Ted attended Ithaca College and was the best attorney to have graduated from South Texas College of Law. Ted claims that he had a wife and children, but they left him because of the stress of his job. A conversation with the Janitor in Season 3 indicates that Ted can speak Korean.

So intense is Ted's hatred for Kelso, who regularly degrades and belittles him, that he regularly has homicidal thoughts about him. Kelso is well aware of these thoughts, which adds to their tensions. He also has an Oedipus complex regarding his mother, with whom he lives. He sleeps in the same bed as her and has remarked that she has installed a camera in the bathroom to check up on him when he bathes. In one episode it is suggested that Ted's mother believes he is a doctor, as he is shown coming home in stolen scrubs, claiming to have saved a patient's life.

Ted leads an a cappella group with three other non-medical hospital employees called the "Worthless Peons" (played by The Blanks, the real-life band of Sam Lloyd), and is shown to be uncharacteristically confident when surrounded by his bandmates. The Peons consist of Randall (Paul F. Perry), who works in accounting and sings bass; Crispin (George Miserlis), who works in shipping and receiving and sings baritone; and Roy (Philip McNiven), who works in on-site property management and sings tenor. Ted also participates in biking and triathlons, often training with Doug Murphy. Later in the series, he joins the Janitor's Brain Trust. With the help of the Janitor and J.D., he finds the courage to ask Stephanie Gooch (Kate Micucci), a ukulele-playing musician who performs for the hospital's child patients, on a date, and the two form a relationship and move in together.Following the revival of Scrubs, Ted is replaced with overly intrusive new HR manager, Sibby Wilson.

Lloyd reprises his role as Ted in three episodes of Cougar Town. In the second-season finale, written and directed by Bill Lawrence, Ted visits the main cast in Hawaii and says that Gooch has left him for an unseen "Dr. Hooch". Ted and his band reappear in Season 3 of Cougar Town, where they audition to play at Disney World. In the episode "A One Story Town", Ted panics when he notices that everyone he meets resembles people he used to work with, including Jules' father, played by Ken Jenkins—as well as Zach Braff, Sarah Chalke, Christa Miller, and Robert Maschio—all as characters who resemble Kelso, J.D., Elliot, Jordan, and Todd, respectively. In season 10, a bar the characters frequent is called Lloyd's Tavern in memory of Ted's actor, Sam Lloyd.

=== Laverne Roberts ===
Laverne Roberts, played by Aloma Wright, is a nurse at Sacred Heart.

While driving to the hospital one morning in the sixth season, Laverne is involved in a car crash, falls into a coma, and is put on life support. Her family decides to take her off after learning that she is brain dead. Employees of the hospital visit her and speak to her, saying final goodbyes. Carla, unable to admit that Laverne has no chance of recovering, avoids this and is followed around by a manifestation of her feelings in the shape of Laverne. The manifestation disappears once Carla finally says goodbye to Laverne, who dies almost immediately afterward. Her character makes a brief appearance in a flashback in "My Comedy Show" and in the Season 8 finale, in J.D.'s last fantasy.

=== Jordan Sullivan ===
Jordan Sullivan
- First appearance: "My Bad" (2001)
- Created by: Bill Lawrence; Gabrielle Allan
- Portrayed by: Christa Miller

In-universe information
- Gender: Female
- Occupation: Retired (as of season 8); Member of the Board of Directors; Administrative worker
- Family: Quinn (father, deceased); Ben (brother, deceased), Danni (sister)
- Spouse: Perry Cox (divorced)
- Children: Jack, Jennifer Dylan

Jordan Sullivan, played by Christa Miller (the real-life spouse of series creator Bill Lawrence), is the ex-wife of Perry Cox and a member (later retired) of the Sacred Heart Board of Directors. She first appears in "My Bad" (Season 1) as J.D.'s patient, and she seduces him before he finds out she is Dr. Cox's ex-wife.

Jordan's father, Quinn Sullivan, was on the Board of Directors, and she inherited the position after his death. She is the sister of Ben Sullivan, a close friend of Dr. Cox, and Danni Sullivan, an ex-girlfriend of J.D.'s. After her divorce from Dr. Cox, they maintain a strictly sexual relationship, and they both continue to have feelings for each other and get back together shortly before the birth of their son, Jack. In Season 6, they have a daughter, Jennifer Dylan (named by J.D., after his initials). In Season 8, both Jordan and Dr. Cox start to wear their wedding rings again, even though they are no longer married.

Jordan is sarcastic, vindictive, and cold; she blames this on her parents, but in Season 6, she admits to Elliot that her parents had been supportive and were not the cause of her behavior. Though never seen on screen, her mother is referenced in three episodes. Jordan occasionally struggles with being middle-aged. She primarily targets men in their twenties for her one night stands, partly as a self-test to find out whether she is still sexually attractive to a younger age group, and she has admitted freely that she has undergone cosmetic surgery. The Janitor strongly implies in "My Life in Four Cameras" that Jordan has bipolar disorder. Jordan returns in the season 10 finale.

Despite her cruelty, Jordan shows loyalty toward friends and sometimes tries to fix her wrongdoings. She gradually develops a tolerance and almost fondness for Elliot, as they can both easily manipulate their boyfriends.

=== Doug Murphy ===
Dr. Doug Murphy
- First appearance: "My Mentor" (2001)
- Last appearance: "My Soul on Fire: Part 2" (2009)
- Created by: Bill Lawrence
- Portrayed by: Johnny Kastl

In-universe information
- Nicknames: Nervous Guy, Pee Pants
- Gender: Male
- Title(s): Doctor of Pathology; Former Doctor of Internal Medicine
- Occupation: Pathologist

Dr. Doug Murphy, played by Johnny Kastl, was a pathologist at Sacred Heart, formerly a doctor of internal medicine. Doug was an incompetent nervous wreck who often accidentally killed patients assigned to him, and even had causes of deaths named after him. He even said in the season 4 episode "My First Kill" his first kill was 40 minutes into his first day. Because of his anxiety, he was nicknamed "nervous guy" and "pee pants" by Dr. Cox, who, along with Dr. Kelso, degraded him constantly. Despite his lack of medical skills and having to repeat his third year of residency, Doug eventually became a licensed physician. However, he began to doubt himself and came to the conclusion that he should not be a doctor. While on a trip to the morgue, he realized that because of the number of deaths he had been responsible for, he was able to identify the cause of death of several people. He became an expert coroner but still made several mistakes, such as forgetting a gurney, misplacing a dead body, or failing to retrieve a patient before rigor mortis set in. He also mentioned in "My Way Home" that he hated dead people: J.D. tried to sneak out of the hospital in a body bag, and when he sat up, Doug believed he was a zombie, panicked, and hit him repeatedly with a fire extinguisher, saying, "Dead people should be dead!"

Doug was often seen sucking on lollipops (an homage to the original Kojak), as were other coroners at Sacred Heart. At the baby shower for Carla and Turk's child, Doug and some other coroners were shown eating and trading lollipops. Doug and Ted often hung out with each other, and were revealed to bike and compete in triathlons together, as well. Doug, Ted, and Todd were all members of the Janitor's second Brain Trust, but Doug was temporarily replaced with Lloyd. Doug revealed that, after putting toe tags on cadavers for so long, he had developed a foot fetish, and he was later found hiding under a reception desk because he "got tired of looking at dead ones' feet".

=== Keith Dudemeister ===
Keith Dudemeister, played by Travis Schuldt, was a medical resident at Sacred Heart. The episode "My Intern's Eyes" was shown through (but not narrated from) Keith's point of view. Keith was introduced as a timid intern who became very popular amongst his fellow interns and some senior staff. He enters into a relationship with Elliot and they become engaged to marry until she breaks off the engagement with him for JD.

=== Kim Briggs ===
Dr. Kim Briggs
- First appearance: "My Urologist" (2006)
- Last appearance: "My Chief Concern" (2009)
- Created by: Bill Lawrence; Neil Goldman and Garrett Donovan
- Portrayed by: Elizabeth Banks

In-universe information
- Gender: Female
- Title: Doctor of Urology
- Occupation: Urologist at Sacred Heart Hospital
- Significant other: J.D. (ex)
- Children: Sam Perry Gilligan Dorian (with J.D.)

Kimberly "Kim" Briggs, played by Elizabeth Banks, was a former urologist at Sacred Heart and the mother of J.D.'s child, Sam Perry Gilligan Dorian. Kim had been working in the hospital on J.D.'s first day (the pilot episode) and attended Ben's funeral in "My Screw Up". However, J.D. did not notice her because of her wedding ring (married women were "invisible" to J.D.). Elliot later remarked that Kim was actually divorced and wore the ring only to avoid unwanted advances from other doctors. J.D. and Kim started dating, and she revealed in "My Transition" that she was pregnant. Ironically, the two had not actually had sex because they did not want to risk pregnancy; instead, their child was accidentally conceived via premature ejaculation during non-penetrative sex. The two vacillated on whether to have an abortion, but decided to have the baby after Turk and Carla's daughter was born. In "My House", Kim accepted a position at a hospital in Tacoma, Washington, but said she would return in about four months. J.D. decided to make a surprise visit in "My Road to Nowhere" in order to see her first ultrasound, but when he arrived, she told him she had miscarried. In light of this news, the two had a long conversation about their relationship and ultimately decided to end it. At the end of the episode, however, Kim was seen during her ultrasound, having lied to J.D. so he would not feel he had to stay with her.

In "My Conventional Wisdom", Turk and J.D. went to a medical convention in Phoenix, Arizona. Coincidentally, Kim was speaking at the convention, and was visibly still pregnant. After J.D. confronted her, she pleaded with him to discuss their problems, but he was too angry and left, overwhelmed. She followed him back to Sacred Heart and confronted him. J.D. decided to listen to his conscience in "My Rabbit" and support Kim, solely for the sake of their son. However, their relationship soon reignited, and they became a couple again. J.D. avoided telling Kim he loved her, still contemplating whether they were right for each other. When Kim went into labor in "My Hard Labor", she demanded to know what he really thought of their relationship. J.D. ultimately told her the truth—that he did not really love her anymore—and she was furious and ended the relationship. After the birth, however, they agreed to remain friends for the sake of their child. She moved away afterward with Sam, but J.D. still saw him often. In "My Cuz", Kim was revealed to be dating Sean Kelly, Elliot's ex-boyfriend; Elliot had introduced them after Kim and J.D.'s breakup. In "My Chief Concern", Kim was present when J.D. was hired at her hospital.

=== Sibby Wilson ===
Sibby Wilson
- First appearance: "My Return" (2026)
- Created by: Aseem Batra & Tim Hobert
- Portrayed by: Vanessa Bayer

In-universe information
- Gender: Female
- Title: Head of H.R.

Sibby Wilson, played by Vanessa Bayer, is the new head of H.R and wellness specialist of Sacred Heart in season one of the revival series. She has clashes with Dr. Cox over his abrasive approach to teaching, one of the reasons for his retirement. In "My Poker Face", it is revealed that Sibby has a gambling problem. She develops a friendship with Elliot, bonding over their difficulties dating.

=== Kevin Park ===
Dr. Kevin Park
- First appearance: "My Return" (2026)
- Last appearance: "My Celebration" (2026)
- Created by: Aseem Batra & Tim Hobert
- Portrayed by: Joel Kim Booster

In-universe information
- Gender: Male
- Occupation: Doctor of internal medicine

Dr. Kevin Park, played by Joel Kim Booster, is a doctor at Sacred Heart introduced in the season one of the revival series. He is not happy when Dr. Cox names J.D. as his successor as chief of medicine. He is bound and determined to become chief.

=== Asher Green ===
Dr. Asher Green
- First appearance: "My Return" (2026)
- Created by: Aseem Batra & Tim Hobert
- Portrayed by: Jacob Dudman

In-universe information
- Gender: Male
- Title: Intern
- Occupation: Doctor of internal medicine
- Nationality: British

Dr. Asher Green, played by Jacob Dudman, is an optimistic but weak-willed British medical intern at Sacred Heart introduced in season one of the revival series. He came to the United States at the age of 16 to look after his sick father. His mother stayed in England. He has a crush on Amara. Amara kisses him in "My V.I.P." but in the next episode she tells him that she wants to keep things casual. However, they let things carry on as normal. In the season one finale, "My Celebration", Amara ends the situationship between her and Asher. After Sam has shown concern for Asher's problems at word and his situation with Amara throughout the entire season, she confesses to him that she has a crush on him, and they kiss.

=== Blake Lewis ===
Dr. Blake Lewis
- First appearance: "My Return" (2026)
- Created by: Aseem Batra & Tim Hobert
- Portrayed by: David Gridley

In-universe information
- Gender: Male
- Title: Intern
- Occupation: Doctor of internal medicine

Dr. Blake Lewis, played by David Gridley, is the stoic medical intern at Sacred Heart introduced in season one of the revival series. In the revival series premiere, "My Return", he refuses to see a woman who has stomach pains because she does not have insurance. By the end of the episode she dies of a heart attack leaving him feel responsible for her death. As the season progresses, we learn that Blake had to work his way up from the bottom. He learns how important it is for a doctor to show vulnerability. He becomes friends with Sam and Asher. In the final episode, he and Amara grow closer.

=== Amara Hadi ===
Dr. Amari Hadi
- First appearance: "My Return" (2026)
- Created by: Aseem Batra & Tim Hobert
- Portrayed by: Layla Mohammadi

In-universe information
- Gender: Female
- Title: Intern
- Occupation: Surgeon

Dr. Amara Hadi, played by Layla Mohammadi, is a surgical intern under Turk at Sacred introduced in season one finale of the revival series. Unbeknownst to her that Asher has a crush on her, she kisses him in "My V.I.P.". But in the next episode she tells him that she wants to keep things casual. In the season 1 finale, "My Celebration" Amara ends the situationship between her and Asher. In this episode, she and Blake grow closer.

=== Dashana Trainor ===
Dr. Dashana Trainor
- First appearance: "My Return" (2026)
- Created by: Aseem Batra & Tim Hobert
- Portrayed by: Amanda Morrow

In-universe information
- Gender: Female
- Title: Intern
- Occupation: Surgeon

Dr. Dashana Trainor, played by Amanda Morrow, is a surgical intern under Turk at Sacred Heart introduced in season one of the revival series. She doesn't want to be emotionally open with her patients and their families.

=== Pippa Raymond ===
Pippa Raymond
- First appearance: "My Return" (2026)
- Last appearance: "My Celebration" (2026)
- Created by: Aseem Batra & Tim Hobert
- Portrayed by: X Mayo

In-universe information
- Gender: Female
- Occupation: Nurse

Nurse Pippa Raymond, played by X Mayo, is a charge nurse at Sacred Heart introduced in season one in the revival series. She likes to gossip with Nurse Francois.

=== Francois Dubois ===
Francois Dubois
- First appearance: "My Return" (2026)
- Created by: Aseem Batra & Tim Hobert
- Portrayed by: Michael James Scott

In-universe information
- Gender: Male
- Occupation: Nurse

Nurse Francois Dubois, played by Michael James Scott, is a charge nurse at Sacred Heart introduced in season one of the revival series. He enjoys gossiping along with Nurse Pippa.

=== Grant Summers ===
Grant Summers
- First appearance: "My First Time in a While" (2026)
- Created by: Aseem Batra & Tim Hobert
- Portrayed by: John Higgins

In-universe information
- Gender: Male
- Title: Chief Resident
- Occupation: Doctor of internal medicine

Grant Summers, portrayed by John Higgins, is the new Chief Resident in season two of the revival series. J.D. wants to mentor him and take him under his wing.

== Minor characters ==
=== Dr. Phillip Wen ===
Dr. Wen, played by Charles Chun, was an attending surgeon who mentored Turk and the Todd for their first three years at the hospital. He tended to be very serious and business-like, and was one of very few characters not treated comically (although a couple of attempts were made, such as when he and Turk argued over what song to play during a surgery and when he pushed Turk to help him beat Dr. Cox and J.D. at wheelchair racing). Dr. Wen was more dispassionate and modest than most surgeons, but he did have an egotistic, competitive side; he competed against Dr. Cox in a wheelchair race between the medical and surgical branches. He was one of the few characters to refer to Turk by his first name, Christopher. Little is known about Wen's personal life other than that he was married, and that his wife once broke her legs in a car accident. Although his full position at the hospital is unknown, he was chief of surgery until he passed the title to Turk. He was inordinately fond of the song "A Little Respect" by Erasure.

Dr. Wen was not featured on the show after Season 6, but in Season 8, his name was seen on Dr. Cox's "Sometimes Allowed" list, and he was parodied in the annual interns' sketch show. J.D. commented that the Dr. Wen sketch was not working, referring to Dr. Wen's lack of comedic flair. When Carla became a surgical nurse, revealing things about Turk in surgery, Dr. Wen was seen laughing with the Todd under his mask. He made an appearance in the series finale. The character has the same name as a former writing partner of series writer Bill Callahan; the two previously wrote for Spin City, which was co-created by Scrubs creator Bill Lawrence. Callahan and Wen parted ways in 2003 while working on 8 Simple Rules, a year before Callahan joined the show's writing staff. In "My Catalyst", his nametag said Phillip Wen.

=== Ben Sullivan ===
Benjamin "Ben" Sullivan, played by Brendan Fraser, was a carpenter and photographer who was Jordan's and Danni's older brother and Cox's brother-in-law and best friend. Unlike his sisters, Ben was laid-back and genial with a good sense of humor. He was an expert at identifying actresses who had appeared naked in movies (a trait that allowed him to become fast friends with J.D., who had a similar skill), and was described by Jordan as "clumsy", which caused many accidents during his carpentry jobs. Ben was diagnosed with leukemia, which initially caused a rift in his friendship with Cox (because Cox was unable to handle the fact that Ben had only a 30% chance of survival), but J.D. convinced Cox to support Ben. Ben eventually went into remission. He then traveled on the "World Leukemia Tour" for two years and returned only in time for his nephew Jack's birthday in "My Screw Up". Cox, despite being disappointed with Ben for not seeing a single "doctor, medicine man, or 'scary shaman with saucers in his ears'" during his extended trip, was nonetheless overjoyed to see him again, and left Ben in J.D.'s care while Cox made arrangements for Jack's birthday party. Ben went into cardiac arrest and died 20 minutes after Cox left the hospital. Cox took his death very badly, initially blaming J.D. and sending him home, but Ben's ghost (a figment of Cox's imagination) reminded him that it was not J.D.'s fault, and Cox later apologized. Everyone at the hospital was saddened by Ben's death, and many senior staff members attended his funeral two days later. Finally, Cox accepted Ben's death and his ghost dissipated. Cox sat with Jordan and J.D. in the front row at the funeral and sobbed.

=== Lonnie ===
Lonnie, (played by Michael Hobert), first seen in "His Story II", began working at Sacred Heart as one of J.D.'s interns in Season 3. While trying to impress a date, J.D. stole Lonnie's scrubs and told his date that Lonnie was his "slave". In Season 4, Lonnie became a second-year resident and was taught by co-chief residents Elliot and J.D. He continued his residency in Season 5, supervised by Dr. Cox. He was part of the Triple Giant Doctor in "My Ocardial Infarction". He had three children "that he knew of", all daughters; he could grow a moustache in one day; and he played Big East Conference basketball for Villanova University, where he was All-Conference. During Season 4, J.D. strongly disliked him because of his outgoing nature, but perhaps more so because, unlike most of the other interns, Lonnie did not appear to fear J.D. He briefly appeared in Season 6. Michael Hobert, who played him, also appeared as an extra in the pilot episode, as a patient getting an MRI scan near the end of the episode. In the Season 8 finale, "My Finale", Lonnie was shown one last time. His last words were, "I hate you so much, J.D."

=== Lloyd ===
Lloyd, the Delivery Guy (played by writer Mike Schwartz)—whose last name may be Slawski, his father's surname—was a member of the air band Cool Cats with Turk, Ted, and the Janitor, where he played air drums. He had been in rehab for drug use but relapsed (though he did not use needles, and carried a straw). He admitted to J.D. that he once received a DUI for crack cocaine. In an early episode, he was a patient at the hospital after getting his penis stuck in a flashlight. He was also seen in a musical number after getting feces thrown in his eye by a homeless person. It was revealed that he was the son of "Colonel Doctor" when J.D. was taped to the ceiling in the episode "My Perspective".

Lloyd was also an avid fan of speed metal, which he aggressively blasted while driving his truck. This was introduced in Season 6's "My Therapeutic Month", when J.D. asked Lloyd for a ride and Lloyd introduced him to the metal band Devildriver, specifically their songs "The Devil's Son" and "Driving Down the Darkness". In "My No Good Reason", Dr. Cox used Lloyd as part of a plan to get Nurse Laverne Roberts to admit that bad things sometimes happen for no reason, but she saw through the plan ("That's not her father; that's the delivery guy in a sweater"). In "My Long Goodbye", J.D. sent a text message to Lloyd to go pick up Dr. Cox's son, Jack, from daycare because J.D. had not listened to Dr. Cox when he asked him to do it. Lloyd proceeded to blast speed metal from his radio with Jack in the car, lip-syncing to "Driving Down the Darkness" while Jack air drummed.

Lloyd was once referred to as the loneliest person in the hospital. In the Season 1 episode "My Old Lady", Lloyd was in one of J.D.'s fantasies, dumping a ton of bricks on J.D.'s head. He delivered syringes and installed Elliot's stripper pole in the episode "Their Story", and it was revealed in "My Turf War" that he was a hypochondriac. In the Season 6 finale, Lloyd was part of the Janitor's Brain Trust, replacing an upset Doug. However, he was fired from the group after his tryout.

In one of his early appearances, when making fun of Carla, his nametag said Frank. Lloyd's uniform consisted of blue shorts and a blue shirt. It was revealed in "My Identity Crisis" that his father's name was Coleman Slawski (Colonel Doctor), and so he was probably Lloyd Slawski. According to RateYourDoc.org, Lloyd became an ambulance driver for Sacred Heart after cleaning up. In Season 8's "My Soul on Fire Part 1", the Janitor announced to the Brain Trust that Lloyd had died while snorkeling in his father's pool. This turned out to be false when Lloyd entered the room and said that he had faked his own death.

=== Seymour Beardfacé ===
Dr. Seymour "Beard Face" Beardfacé, played by Geoff Stevenson, was a doctor with a thick and bushy beard, which inspired everyone to refer to him as "Beard Face" rather than the correct pronunciation, /ˌbɪərd fæˈseɪ/. This angered him and prompted the repeated line, "It's Beardfacé, damn it." He was first seen in the Season 2 episode "My Case Study". Beardfacé was the fastest appendectomist at Sacred Heart until Turk took the title, a moment Turk considered one of his greatest. In Scrubs: Interns, it was revealed that Beardfacé was going through a "gender identity crisis", inviting Howie to dinner and stealing sports bras. He was seen talking to an intern in Season 9's "Our First Day of School", but was only in the background and had no lines.

=== Kevin Casey ===
Dr. Kevin Casey, played by Michael J. Fox, was a doctor at a different hospital who was a past associate of Dr. Cox. He was a doctor with genius-level intellect who specialized in both internal medicine and surgery. Dr. Casey suffered from severe obsessive–compulsive disorder: He washed his hands hours after his last surgery, avoided lengthy physical contact, and drove home to use his own restroom. Although his condition ruined his social life, he saw it as the key to his successful career. Stating that medicine is all about obsession, he read and studied medical texts repeatedly and hypothesized every possible scenario that could befall a patient; he was undeniably competent and had high-self esteem. His medical and surgical skills were superior to Dr. Cox's and Turk's. He also appeared to have a photographic memory and was able to cite information from thousands of pages of medical textbooks.

=== Coleman Slawski ===
Dr. Coleman "Colonel Doctor" Slawski, played by Bob Bencomo, was a doctor whose name nobody seemed to know. He was seen as early as Season 1's "My Super Ego", but his nickname (stemming from his striking resemblance to Colonel Sanders) was not introduced until Season 5's "My Jiggly Ball", when he laughed at a joke Dr. Kelso had made and Kelso said, "Thank you, Colonel Doctor!" To Slawski's "Excuse me?" Kelso replied: "I'm sorry. I don't know your name, and you look like that Kentucky Fried Chicken guy." The Janitor watched surveillance footage of Slawski using the bathroom so he could "freak him out" by guessing how many times he had gone during a given day. Like Dr. Mickhead, he was around since the show began but was originally supposed to be an extra. He was shown to be the father of Lloyd the Delivery Guy when J.D. was taped to the ceiling in the Season 6 episode "My Perspective". His real name was revealed in Season 7's "My Identity Crisis". His name (Coleman Slawski) was a play on the word coleslaw. He was seen in the background of many Season 9 episodes.

=== Hooch ===
Dr. Hooch, played by Phill Lewis, was an orthopedic surgeon whom Turk and J.D. enjoyed antagonizing. When he was introduced, he was an easygoing guy, but because of a combination of people accidentally calling his name and J.D. and Turk pulling pranks, he gradually became angrier and eventually snapped. Hooch became very aggressive; he once knocked a man out with his shoe for trying to exit an elevator he was guarding for J.D. Earlier in the same episode, when J.D. and Turk put bouillon cubes in his shower head, he rushed out of the shower room and threatened everyone in the area: "If it happens again, I will wait in my SUV—blast me some speed metal, 5.1 surround sound, heavy on the bass—and someone will be getting mowed down.") Upon learning that Turk was the culprit, he threatened to take one of Turk's fingers as his own "funny prank". In response to Hooch's extreme behavior, J.D. and Turk habitually said "Hooch is crazy" in a nonchalant tone. They paired him with another doctor, Dr. Paul Turner (played by Jim Hanks, brother of Tom Hanks, who played the titular Turner in the movie Turner & Hooch), in one episode to create what J.D. described as "a super medical crime-fighting team", Turner and Hooch. Despite resenting J.D. and Turk for the manipulation, Turner and Hooch formed a good team and were near tears when they were forced to split. Hooch briefly replaced Turk as J.D.'s best friend and was given the nickname Chocolate Bear Two.

In "My Growing Pains", Hooch was fired for being involved in a hostage situation. This was presumably because Rex and three other interns had followed him around all day, again as a prank by J.D. and Turk. In "My New Role" in Season 8, he appeared on the "Never Ever, Ever, Ever, Ever, Ever Allowed in Dr. Cox's Office" list along with J.D. and Jordan, despite the fact that he had been fired. (Jordan was no longer working at Sacred Heart at that point, either.) He was seen in the Season 8 finale in a straitjacket, saying, "Hooch is crazy." Hooch returns in the season 10 revival.

In the Season 2 finale of Cougar Town, Ted Buckland revealed that, since the end of Scrubs, Hooch had run away with Ted's former girlfriend, Stephanie Gooch.

=== Leonard ===
Leonard, played by producer Randall Winston, was the hospital's security guard, easily recognizable thanks to his height, giant afro and the hook he had in place of his right hand. He was first seen in J.D.'s fantasy of denial in Season 1's "My Occurrence", still having his right hand. One of the show's many running jokes (first made in Season 3's "My Screw Up") was that whenever he was mentioned, he was called the "big black security guard with the hook for the hand", but everyone knew him by his giant afro. When his relationship with second-year resident Gloria was revealed in Season 5's "My Lunch", she stated that she was "never going back", and Leonard told everyone that he loved "white meat". He did not allow bouncing basketballs in the hallways and confiscated (and popped) Turk's, because of J.D., on more than one occasion. Leonard lost his hand after it was caught in an ice machine (sometime between episodes 1.22 and 3.14), and he received a $5,000,000 settlement from the hospital. He might have been bisexual, for in Season 5's "My Chopped Liver", when Dr. Cox was pretending to mentor the interns, Gloria said that her boyfriend was bi-curious and wanted her to pick his lovers. This would only prove to be true, though, if Gloria and Leonard were already dating at that point. He appeared in the finale alongside Gloria, where he said, "Got me some white meat." Gloria was later seen pregnant with Leonard's twin children.

=== Walter Mickhead ===
Dr. Walter Mickhead, played by Frank Encarnacao, made his first appearance in Season 2's "My Overkill". He was originally known as "black-haired doctor". He was one of a handful of characters who started out as extras for the show (Dr. Kelso addressed him as a pediatrician, Dr. Carlson, in "My Case Study" in Season 2). His real name was first mentioned in Season 3's "My White Whale", when J.D. told Turk, "The girl one just called you Dr. Jerk!" and Turk replied: "No sweat. You should hear what [the interns] call Dr. Mickhead." In "My Porcelain God", J.D. mentioned that Dr. Kevin Casey had helped Mickhead overcome his addiction to huffing paint. In "My Quarantine" in Season 4, he turned out to be one of many hospital staff members who had slept with Jordan during her separation from Dr. Cox. When Dr. Cox thanks whoever taught her the "reverse cowgirl" position, both J.D. and Dr. Mickhead reply, "You're welcome".

In Season 5's "Her Story II", it was revealed that his wife was recently murdered and that Mickhead was a "person of interest" in the investigation. He did not do much to rebut the suspicion that he was involved in his wife's death, first practically making out with a nurse in the hospital a few days after the event, then asking J.D.'s girlfriend Julie to hide a hammer (supposedly the murder weapon) for him in her basement, a maneuver J.D. stopped at the last second. Later in the episode, Mickhead was seized by two policemen, protesting his innocence and fighting the arrest. In Season 5's "My Cabbage", he gave out "cool" orange prison jumpsuits to people at the hospital after his release. Dr. Cox remarked in Season 6, in "My Conventional Wisdom", that Mickhead had just barely beaten the rap.

In Season 6's "His Story IV", he identified himself as a Republican. Also in Season 6, it was revealed that he was a surgeon. In "My Saving Grace" (Season 8), short-time chief of medicine Dr. Maddox admitted that she had had a sexual relationship with Mickhead, complaining that he had to choke her to keep an erection, to which Mickhead replied, "I have needs." He was seen in "My Finale", when J.D. imagined everyone he had met at the hospital, and simply said, "I didn't kill her."

=== Molly Clock ===
Dr. Molly Clock, played by Heather Graham, was an attending psychiatrist at Sacred Heart who first appeared in the Season 4 episode "My Old Friend's New Friend". Turk said that Dr. Clock was the second hottest employee at Sacred Heart (after Nurse Tisdale) and that he would kill to have sex with her; however, he also disapproved of her profession and sometimes referred to her as a "devil woman". Dr. Clock was perky and extremely optimistic, expressing great joy over the fact that the hospital cafeteria was serving kielbasa and arguing that all people were innately good-natured. She was excellent at her job, very intelligent and self-confident, and as a result, she became the mentor and role model that Elliot had always wanted (along with Carla). She had an uncanny ability to single out a person's deepest insecurity, once reducing Elliot to tears with the word "eyebrows". Dr. Clock was one of the few people in the hospital who were completely impervious to Dr. Cox's sarcastic barbs. She used the time in which he was ranting to compose flippant replies, which annoyed him to no end.

In Season 4's "My Last Chance", Dr. Clock announced her plan to accept a position at a Milwaukee hospital and made out with J.D. at her farewell party. She agreed to sleep with J.D., but only if Elliot gave him permission. She ended up leaving without anything happening between the two of them after Elliot gave J.D. a note that he believed gave him permission to sleep with Dr. Clock, but actually said, "Now we're even." She was last seen in Season 4's "My Best Laid Plans", when she returned to Sacred Heart and ended up at a bar with J.D., willing to go all the way—but J.D. decided not to. The name Molly Clock was in homage to one of the medical consultants on the show, Dr. Dolly Klock.

=== Randall Winston ===
Randall Winston, played by Martin Klebba, was a little person who worked in the janitorial branch of Sacred Heart. He had a very likable demeanor and addressed people as "Bro" or "Brah". The character was named for one of the show's producers, Randall Winston (who played Leonard, the security guard with a hook for a hand). Randall's first two appearances took place in J.D.'s daydreams, in which J.D. imagined Randall dressed in a karate gi and punching him repeatedly in the crotch in surprise attacks: first after jumping out of J.D.'s locker, and then when J.D. walked in on one of Dr. Cox and Jordan's sadomasochistic sex routines in which Randall seemed to participate. It was later revealed that these fantasies related to Randall's being treated at Sacred Heart for a kidney injury after sparring in his karate class and to his frequent use of the expression "punch in the crotch" ("My Rule of Thumb", Season 3).

In Season 3's "My Catalyst", the Janitor introduced Randall to Dr. Kelso as "my new associate". Kelso offered the two of them $23 a month to get rid of the hospital's trash (which they did by simply dumping it on a roof behind the hospital). When J.D. learned in "My Butterfly" that Randall had been hired to work at Sacred Heart, he realized "why he's been back in my dreams"—that is, emerging from the chest cavity of a surgery patient and punching Turk in the crotch. In "My Self-Examination", he was elected president of the hospital's janitor union, beating the Janitor, who assured him that he had some hard feelings for him. This was one of several cases in which the Janitor drew the short straw in competing with Randall. For instance, Randall was incredibly strong for his size and not only was able to bring the Janitor to his knees by squeezing his hand and apparently breaking it ("It's like a mechanical vise!" a tormented Janitor observed), but also beat him once in a wrestling match. When the Janitor challenged him to a rematch on the roof of the hospital, Randall responded, "You never learn, do you?" ("My Catalyst", Season 3).

Although generally on good terms with J.D., Randall at least once participated in a prank the Janitor played on him. When J.D. was about to check on Randall for a fake injury he supposedly suffered when an air conditioning vent collapsed on him, Randall coughed out, "Co-chief! Co-chief!" as part of the Janitor's elaborate attempts to demote J.D. from his new chief resident position ("My New Game", Season 4). Randall was also a member of the first Brain Trust and was the third member of Hibbleton, the Janitor's a cappella band. He appeared in "My Finale" as one of the many supporting characters whom J.D. saw as part of a final fantasy down the hallway leading toward the hospital's exit, where he said, "Way to leave a cherry gig, brah", and pretended to punch J.D. in the crotch.

Bill Lawrence included a character named Randall Winston, the mayor of New York, in his previously co-created sitcom, Spin City. Both characters were named after the actor who played Leonard on Scrubs. The real-life Winston was the basis for the character Carter on Spin City, and his friendship with Lawrence was the basis for the one shared by Turk and J.D. on Scrubs.

=== Snoop Dogg Attending ===
Ronald, aka Snoop Dogg Attending (formerly Snoop Dogg Resident and Snoop Dogg Intern), played by Manley Henry, nicknamed because of his physical resemblance to Snoop Dogg. He was seen as an intern as early as Season 1's "My Super Ego" but was not credited. He was first mentioned in the Season 3 episode "My Porcelain God" (he asked "Where my hos at?" to which J.D. replied, "I haven't seen them"). He was given the name Snoop Dogg Resident in the Season 6 episode "My Fishbowl". He was also seen to be an attending in the Season 5 episode "My Jiggly Ball", as he balanced on a wheelchair with the other attending physicians to determine which of them would introduce Dr. Kelso at a conference. He later got a snake when a patient who owned a pet store gave it to him, and said, "My hos are gonna love this." He was mentioned again in Season 6's "My Long Goodbye". It was revealed in Season 7's "My Own Worst Enemy" that he had become an attending, after J.D. incorrectly called him an intern and then a resident. In Season 6's "Their Story", his annoyance that nobody called him by his real name, Ronald, was revealed. Like Dr. Mickhead, Colonel Doctor, and Dr. Beardfacé, Ronald was a longtime extra before being mentioned. Also revealed in "My Own Worst Enemy" was that he had feelings for a squeaky-voiced intern named Josephine. He was seen with his arm around Josephine in "My Finale", during J.D.'s fantasy about everyone he had met at the hospital, and had a brief cameo in Season 9's "Our Drunk Friend".

=== Troy ===
Troy, played by Joe Rose, worked in the Sacred Heart cafeteria and was the Janitor's lackey/sidekick. He was first seen in Season 2 in "My Big Mouth", when J.D. inadvertently insulted him while trying to make the Janitor feel better about his role in the hospital. Just like the Janitor, Troy came to hate J.D., and he and the Janitor often teamed up to intimidate and harass him. However, Troy's tendency to get overenthusiastic while messing with J.D. annoyed the Janitor, and he frequently had to remind Troy to play it cool, especially when it came to Troy's occasional homicidal urges. When J.D. embarrassed them by showing that, even on second try, they were unable to solve the riddle of what two coins could be used to make 30 cents if one of them is not a nickel (a challenge he first presented to them in "My Lucky Night" in Season 3), the Janitor had to interfere so that Troy would not attack J.D. with a crowbar ("My Déjà Vu, My Déjà Vu", Season 5). Troy also twice proposed to simply kill J.D. instead of solving the riddle (triggering the Janitor's query "How's therapy going?" on the second occasion). During a brief truce in "My Brother, My Keeper" (Season 2), the Janitor assured J.D. that a reluctant Troy would "stop spitting in your food". Troy was not very intelligent (to solve J.D.'s riddle, he twice proposed taking a penny and a button that he had written "29 cents" on), and the Janitor advised him repeatedly not to procreate. In "My Moment of Un-Truth" (Season 3), the Janitor used Troy as the sole guest at a fake twin birthday party in the cafeteria, a video of which was supposed to serve as "indisputable evidence" to Turk and J.D. that the Janitor had a twin brother called Roscoe. (The clumsiness of the whole performance was partly attributable to Troy's extremely bad acting and his following the Janitor with his eyes as the Janitor switched sides and into the role of Roscoe behind the camera.) Troy was also a member of the first brain trust and of Hibbleton, the Janitor's a cappella group.

=== Paul Zeltzer ===
Dr. Paul Zeltzer, played by Bob Clendenin, was a skilled oncologist who made his first appearance in Season 1 in "My Hero". In Season 2's My New Old Friend", Dr. Cox described him as "the finest oncologist we have on staff". Dr. Zeltzer seemed to have unusual sexual tastes and to enjoy prostitutes: In "His Story", Dr. Cox invited him and some other doctors to his apartment for food and drinks, and Zeltzer immediately asked whether there would be prostitutes there. When Cox told him no, Zeltzer unconvincingly responded, "Oh, uh, good." According to the Season 1 DVD commentary, this trait was given as part of a common practice with one-off staff members who were deemed funny enough to warrant returns: When they returned, a particular character trait was assigned to them, in this case sexual deviancy. This feature was underlined in Season 4's "My Office", when a patient came in with a light bulb stuck in his rectum and Dr. Zeltzer commented, "That's why my wife and I use candles." When Turk responded by calling him "the most disturbing man I've ever met in my life", Zeltzer took it as a compliment and wondered whether Turk and Carla were "open-minded". A flashback revealed that once, when Zeltzer and his wife had Dr. Cox and Jordan over for drinks, they slipped their guests "roofies" (Rohypnol), a date rape drug. After Cox and then Jordan passed out, Mrs. Zeltzer announced, "Party time!" While Jordan was ready to "give them another chance" a year later, Cox angrily turned down an invite to a camping trip with Zeltzer, his wife and "a pretty interesting guy named Ron" ("My Chopped Liver", Season 5). Zeltzer had a strong rivalry with Dr. Leventhal, another oncologist at the hospital, and admitted to having an affair with Leventhal's wife, apparently out of spite ("My New Old Friend", Season 2). He appeared in "My Finale", telling J.D.: "Key party later. There will be prostitutes."

=== Jason Cabbagio ===
Jason "Cabbage" Cabbagio, played by Shaughn Buchholz, first appeared in "My Intern's Eyes" (Season 5). He was J.D.'s favorite intern because he amused J.D. and had a "dynamite ape impression". After Dr. Cox forced J.D. to realize that he was letting his personal feelings for Cabbage (and his dislike of Cabbage's colleague and Elliot's booty call, Keith Dudemeister) get in the way of admitting that Cabbage was never going to be a good doctor, J.D. had to let him go. Before leaving the hospital for the final time as a doctor, Cabbage stopped to pick up a used medical glove and dropped it into a waste bin. This caused him to accidentally spread an infection to Mrs. Wilk when he stopped to thank her for being so kind to him ("My Cabbage"). The infection led to her death in the next episode, "My Five Stages". Cabbage returned in the Season 6 episode "My Coffee" as an employee at Coffee Bucks, the new hospital café.

=== Patricia Wilk ===
Michael Learned played Patricia Wilk, a kind and genial patient who suffered from a very serious disease that caused a lengthy stay in the hospital. While there, she befriended many of the staff, especially her physicians (J.D. and Dr. Cox). Eventually, despite seemingly insurmountable odds, she recovered to the point of being released from the hospital. However, because of the last act of medical ineptitude of Jason "Cabbage" Cabbagio (who forgot to wash his hands after handling an infected medical glove and then shook her hand just before she left for home), she contracted an infection that forced her to return to the hospital one week after leaving. Because of her already seriously weakened immune system, the infection quickly became deadly. Despite the efforts of J.D. and Cox, she was declared terminal. She became depressed and scared of death, and J.D. and Cox went through the five stages of grief on her behalf, but they were all comforted by Doctor Hedrick (a counselor for the terminally ill). Succumbing to the infection, she lapsed into unconsciousness and died peacefully. Mrs. Wilk had a lasting effect on J.D. and could be seen in his "parade" out during the Season 8 finale, saying, "Hi, Tiger."

=== Sean Kelly ===
Sean Kelly, played by Scott Foley, was a handsome and charismatic animal trainer who worked at SeaWorld. He quickly won over all of Elliot's close friends, with the notable exception of J.D., who was jealous of Sean throughout the course of his relationship with Elliot. Elliot and Sean's relationship had its ups and downs, with Elliot ultimately breaking up with him—just as they were preparing to move in together—after realizing that she still had feelings for J.D. Almost immediately, J.D. regretted breaking them up when he realized that he did not really love Elliot and had simply wanted what he could not have. J.D. told Elliot that he did not love her at Turk and Carla's wedding rehearsal in "My Self-Examination", and in the following episode, "My Best Friend's Wedding", he set out to find Sean in an attempt to fix his friendship with Elliot. When J.D. found Sean sitting on the street outside his apartment, Sean was shown to have grown a massive beard in the mere four days since Elliot dumped him, much to J.D.'s amazement. He convinced Sean to come to Turk and Carla's wedding and win Elliot back. Sean did come but was unable to convince Elliot to take him back. He found some satisfaction in the fact that Elliot had had her heart broken too, and ended up leaving the wedding with J.D.'s ex-girlfriend Danni. He made an appearance in Season 8's "My Cuz", in a relationship with Kim Briggs.

=== Sam Dorian ===
Sam Dorian, played by John Ritter, was J.D. and Dan's father, an unsuccessful office supplies salesman. He was the main source of income for his family, and, although he failed to get ideal wages, he still earned enough to sustain his family. Sam and his wife, Barbara, were divorced when J.D. was seven years old, but he remained a part of J.D.'s adult life. He was good friends with Turk, as they both acted and sounded like "real men". Sam was reported to have died after having a "massive heart attack" in the episode "My Cake", and Dan delivered the bad news and a double-layer fudge cake (used in the Dorian family when conveying bad news) to J.D. The episode paid homage to Ritter's real-life death. J.D. named his son, Sam, after his father. Zach Braff mentioned during the commentary on the Season One DVD that Ritter had ad-libbed his final line (a slightly embarrassed "I pooed a little" after soliciting J.D. to pull his finger, a running gag throughout the episode), which caused the entire cast and crew to break up laughing.

=== Dan Dorian ===
Daniel "Dan" Dorian, played by Tom Cavanagh, was J.D.'s older brother, a hyper, quick-witted slacker who lived with his mother in his hometown and worked at a bar; J.D. called him "a self-involved user". J.D. was very uncomfortable when his brother was around, while Dr. Cox was generally disgusted by his lack of maturity and his self-serving attitude and referred to him at one point as "the worst older brother in the world". Dan was seemingly oblivious to Cox's disdain and often reacted to his rants in a nonchalant manner. However, Turk and Elliot genuinely liked him, the latter being somewhat attracted to him in earlier seasons. While at first, J.D. showed signs of jealousy, it was later revealed that J.D. was embarrassed by Dan, and that Dan was aware of it. He was also aware that J.D. looked up to Dr. Cox, and eventually asked Cox to promise that he would never have a reason to let J.D. down.

He had a fling with Elliot in Season 4, which J.D. discovered, to his own surprise, that he did not mind. The siblings were briefly estranged after J.D. tried being honest about Dan's wasting his potential. When J.D. made another attempt to be honest with his brother, however, Dan followed his advice and applied for a new job, made evident by the suit that J.D. gave him for his interview. As of Season 7, Dan was gainfully employed in real estate. He finally purchased his own home and gave J.D. a Prius. J.D. was angry and jealous at first at how quickly and (comparatively) easily Dan had become successful, but he eventually overcame those feelings and was proud of how his brother had turned his life around. Upon meeting J.D.'s son for the first time, Dan noted that his nephew "looks like Dad". Dan makes a brief last appearance in "My Finale" as the first person J.D. imagined as he left the hospital for the last time. His final line was his apparent catchphrase to J.D.: "Heyyy, little brother."

=== Danni Sullivan ===
Danielle "Danni" Sullivan, played by Tara Reid, was an on-again, off-again fling of J.D.'s, similar to many of the women he dated. She was the younger sister of Dr. Cox's ex-wife, Jordan Sullivan. Like J.D., Danni maintained an internal monologue in her head. According to J.D., she had hearing "like a bat". She was also seen dating Larry Thomas of Seinfeld "Soup Nazi" fame. At Turk and Carla's wedding, she made out with both Doug and Ted in quick succession, something she apparently had a habit of doing at people's weddings. This led to a fight between the two when they were quarantined together. According to Turk, she also threw up on his grandmother before leaving the wedding in the company of Sean. She appeared for the last time in Season 4. She was mentioned in Season 9 when Jordan told Dr. Cox that a man she married had died.

=== Ladinia Williams ===
Ladinia "Lady" Williams, played by Kit Pongetti, is the girlfriend of the Janitor, who first appears in the Season 7 premier and marries him in Season 8. She was so named because her parents were watching the film Lady and the Tramp not long after she was conceived. In "My Soul on Fire, Part 2", at Lady's and Janitor's wedding ceremony, the Brain Trust's justice of the peace (a cameo by Bill Lawrence) reveals her full name. Previously, Pongetti had a cameo in "My Philosophy" as Dr. Mitchell, a research fellow with an office next to Dr. Kelso's.

=== Stephanie Gooch ===
Stephanie Gooch, sometimes called simply "The Gooch", was played by Kate Micucci. A local musician who played her ukulele for the hospital's patients, Stephanie became the object of Ted's affection. J.D. and the Janitor called a temporary truce to help Ted with his lack of confidence around women. Although Ted could initially be around her only in the presence of his band, he later overcame his awkwardness. The two began dating, a fact Ted enjoyed flaunting to the hospital's staff. By the end of Season 8, Ted and Stephanie had moved in together. Micucci performed several of her original songs on the show, including "Screw You" (a modified version of her Garfunkel and Oates duet "Fuck You"), which was featured in both Scrubs and the Scrubs: Interns web series. In a guest appearance in "Something Good is Coming", a Season 2 episode of Cougar Town, another series by Scrubs creator Bill Lawrence, Ted said that Gooch had run away with Hooch.

=== Franklyn, MT ===
Franklyn, played by Masi Oka, was a quiet medical technologist seen throughout the series. Because he was so calm and quiet, he was often used by the other characters. For example, when Dr. Cox destroyed Franklyn's lab in a fit of rage, Franklyn still retained his calm demeanor, despite his apparent annoyance. He may also have had a crush on Elliot, as evidenced by the fact that in one episode, Elliot was easily able to persuade him to run a lab on a patient by flirting, though he had other work. She once got him to re-check a test sample by asking him while crying.

=== Harvey Corman ===
Harvey Corman, played by Richard Kind, was an "admittedly frugal hypochondriac" who appeared in the episodes "My Female Trouble", "My Malpractical Decision", "My Fault", and "My New Old Friend". Dr. Cox tried to scare him off by offering a very painful bone marrow test, but was surprised and guilty when he found out that Mr. Corman had Waldenström's macroglobulinemia. He apologized for not believing Mr. Corman, but Mr. Corman lectured him on not caring enough about his patients. In "My Fault", he came to Sacred Heart for a full-body scan in order to find every little thing wrong with him. At the end of the episode, he said of his name that it did not "get him as much action as you may think" after admitting to Dr. Cox, whom he severely annoyed, that he did not get the scan. In earlier episodes, he sued Turk for giving him a restraining order and won the case. He was known to serve a tennis ball with enough force to incapacitate a person.

=== Ed Dhandapani ===
Ed "Big Ed" Dhandapani, played by Aziz Ansari, was a lackadaisical intern who appeared in four episodes of Season 8. Extremely talented at creating fast-spreading catchphrases, Ed was well liked by many at the hospital but hated by J.D. and, later, by Dr. Cox. He stated that he used to be a DJ. Though he was exceptionally intelligent and skilled compared with the other interns, he remained content with being an average doctor and spent more time doing ridiculous activities with his friends than learning medicine. When Dr. Cox realized his laziness, he ordered Ed to spend two days studying cardiac diseases. When he failed to study, Cox fired him.

=== Jimmy ===
Jimmy, played by Taran Killam, was introduced in Season 8. He was known at Sacred Heart as "the Overly Touchy Orderly" because he appeared to have an extreme tactile addiction—touching everyone and offering rubs, massages, or just general physical contact, regardless of whether people consented. However, J.D. stated that Jimmy successfully controlled part of his habit by touching people only above the waist. Jimmy's love for contact extended beyond people; for example, when he was forced to keep his hands to himself, he fondled a table. He was temporarily part of the Janitor's "Brain Trust". He was fired by Doctor Maddox, only to be reinstated when she was removed as chief of medicine. He had a talent for impersonation. He was seen in J.D's last fantasy at Sacred Heart, massaging Dr. Beardfacé.

=== Jill Tracy ===
Jill Tracy, played by Nicole Sullivan, was a recurring patient at Sacred Heart Hospital and one of the longest recurring ancillary characters on Scrubs, appearing in six episodes over five seasons (in chronological order, "My Nickname", "My Occurrence", "My Fifteen Seconds", "My Lunch", "My Long Goodbye", and "My Finale (Part 2)"), starting early in Season 1 and finishing in the Season 8 finale as one of the people J.D. imagines seeing while exiting the hospital for the last time.

J.D. and Dr. Cox found Jill obnoxious, but she bonded with Elliot in Season 1's "My Occurrence". She exhibited telling signs of clinical depression, but because of her cheery-obnoxious personality, doctors misdiagnosed her every time she was admitted to Sacred Heart. During her fourth appearance, in Season 5's "My Lunch", she frequently ran into J.D. at the supermarket. Despite his best efforts to avoid her, she eventually had lunch with him and tried to tell him about her problems, but J.D. was anxious to end the encounter and failed to realize that Jill desperately needed help.

Later in the episode, Jill was admitted to Sacred Heart unconscious and eventually died without regaining consciousness. Because her tox screen was positive for cocaine, and because of what she said at lunch, J.D. concluded that she had died of suicide by overdose. Her organs were given to transplant patients, most of whom were almost out of time. However, the autopsy revealed that she had died of rabies, and all the transplant patients consequently succumbed to the disease. Jill returned as a ghost to haunt Dr. Cox in "My Long Goodbye".

In her last appearance in "My Finale (Part 2)", Jill was the fifth person J.D. saw in his farewell fantasy.

=== Mike Davis ===
Mike Davis, played by Michael McDonald, is another frequent patient at Sacred Heart. He is from Darien and shares a dislike of "touchy, feely culture" with Elliot. His blunt manner often lands him in the hospital, with injuries caused by his mother (who pushed him down the stairs for saying she was fat and boring), his father, a woman he told she "smells like wet ass" and in one episode he has a broken penis. He reappears in J.D.'s farewall fantasy having broken his penis again, but says "this time it was fun." McDonald also directed five episodes.

=== Maintenance Guy ===
Maintenance Guy, played by Darcy Michael is the friendly new custodian at Sacred Heart in season 10. He gets along with J.D. until his father, revealed to be the original Janitor, accuses J.D. of thinking he was hired due to nepotism.

=== Wes ===
Wes, played by Andy Ridings, is a pilot who Elliot briefly dates in season one of the revival series following her divorce from J.D..

=== Charlie ===
Charlie, played by Rachel Bilson, briefly dated J.D. in the revival series. She leaves him for Sean.

=== Ollie Dorian ===
Ollie, played by Kellan Tetelow, J.D. and Elliot's son in the revival series.
