= My First Day =

- Scrubs episode
- J.D.'s first encounter with the Janitor.
- Episode no.: Season 1 Episode 1
- Directed by: Adam Bernstein
- Written by: Bill Lawrence
- Production code: 535G
- Original air date: October 2, 2001

Guest appearances
- Sam Lloyd as Ted Buckland; Robert Maschio as Dr. Todd Quinlan; Aloma Wright as Nurse Laverne Roberts; Jake Fritz as Billy; Mary Gillis as Mrs. Pratt; Michael Hobert as Pizza Guy; Lynne Maclean as Nurse Kearney; Shannon Welles as Old Woman; Matt Winston as Dr. Jeffrey Steadman

Episode chronology
← Previous —	Next → "My Mentor"
- Scrubs season 1

"My First Day" is the pilot episode of the American television sitcom Scrubs. It originally aired on October 2, 2001 on NBC. The episode was written by series creator Bill Lawrence and directed by Adam Bernstein.

Like nearly all other episodes in the series, the title begins with "My". It is narrated by main character John "J.D." Dorian.

== Plot ==
J.D.'s story begins with a first-person narrative, setting the tone and style of the series while introducing the main characters. J.D.'s life slowly unfolds to the audience, showing flashbacks to illustrate J.D.'s relationship with his best friend and fellow doctor Chris Turk. They soon meet Elliot Reid, J.D.'s recurring love interest throughout the series, as well as a number of other key characters in the series. A flashback to the previous day's orientation shows hospital lawyer Ted Buckland advising the doctors on malpractice. Following Ted's presentation, chief of medicine Dr. Bob Kelso introduces himself as the new doctors' "safety net". J.D. reflects that surgical and medical interns are on opposite sides of the hospital's social spectrum, and fears that Turk, a surgical intern, will end their friendship.

As J.D.'s day continues, he is thrust into the fray, but freezes up and relies on nurse Carla Espinosa to carry out a routine IV placement. This scene marks the first appearance of Doctor Perry Cox, J.D.'s reluctant mentor. The first interaction between the two — with Cox mercilessly belittling J.D. — sets up their future relationship.

J.D.'s first movement towards Elliot occurs during rounds with Dr. Kelso, in which J.D. gives Elliot an answer when she appears to be struggling. He then asks her out to dinner. Later, when she refuses to help J.D., he rescinds his invitation. J.D. wonders if Turk is having the same difficulties as he is. After a short conversation, it becomes apparent that Turk is enjoying being a surgical intern. J.D. is introduced to Todd Quinlan, who gives J.D. one of his signature high-fives.

On his second day, J.D., while waiting for Elliot, encounters the hospital's janitor repairing an automatic door. J.D. innocently speculates that the cause of the problem is that maybe a penny is stuck in the door. The suspicious janitor swears vengeance. When J.D. receives his first code page, he hides in a medical supply closet and discovers Elliot hiding as well. Dr. Cox finds them hiding and is unfazed. Turk and Carla's relationship becomes sexual during an encounter in the on-call room. Later on, when Elliot mentions this to Carla, Carla gives Elliot a long speech about judging others, leaving Elliot dumbfounded.

During J.D.'s first night on call, he has the nurses do a number of his procedures. Nurse Laverne Roberts tells him that a patient he had bonded with earlier has died, and says, "Just pronounce him so I can go home". Shortly afterward, J.D. runs into Turk, who admits that he, too, is scared of the new hospital environment, and that he has already moved his things into J.D.'s apartment.

When J.D. asks him for help, Dr. Kelso shows his dark side; he angrily tells J.D. that he only cares about patients who have the necessary health insurance, and that he only carries a chart with him everywhere so that he can pretend to remember the new interns' names. J.D. eventually overcomes his fears and, with Dr. Cox's encouragement, successfully inserts a chest tube. Elliot comes to tell J.D. she talked to the family of his patient which was pronounced dead, as an apology. She then kisses J.D. on the cheek. Happy to have gone through his first three days "without looking like a complete idiot", he leaves and runs into a glass door.

== Cultural references ==
- In the first scene, as J.D. rises out of the bed, he is wearing a Clone High T-shirt. Clone High was also created by Scrubs creator Bill Lawrence. Clone High didn't premiere until 2002.
- The medical interns are shown playing a Pac-Man arcade machine.

== Production details ==
Several of the scenes from this episode are based on the real-life experiences of medical adviser Jon Doris, a close friend of director Bill Lawrence. This includes the scene where an attempted paracentesis results in a jet of fluid, and another where J.D. hides to avoid being the first on the scene of an emergency, although both of these scenes are exaggerated.

- The set for J.D.'s sitcom fantasy is that of My Wife and Kids.
- Footage from this episode was later re-used in "My Urologist", with Dr. Kim Briggs digitally worked into it to make it look like she was there on J.D.'s first day.
- This was the only episode of the first eight seasons of Scrubs not shot at the former North Hollywood Medical Center. Instead, it was filmed at another hospital in Glendale, California. This hospital has since been torn down.
