= My Occurrence =

- Scrubs episode
- Episode no.: Season 1 Episode 22
- Directed by: Lawrence Trilling
- Written by: Bill Lawrence
- Production code: S122
- Original air date: May 7, 2002

Guest appearances
- Sam Lloyd as Ted Buckland; Robert Maschio as Todd Quinlan; Christa Miller as Jordan Sullivan; Johnny Kastl as Doug Murphy; Brendan Fraser as Ben Sullivan; Nicole Sullivan as Jill Tracy; Steven Hack as Dr. Fred Bobb; Mary McDonald as Nurse Nancy; Kimberley S. Newberry as Dr. Allan; Masi Oka as Frank

Episode chronology
← Previous "My Sacrificial Clam"	Next → "My Hero"
- Scrubs season 1

"My Occurrence" is the 22nd episode of the first season of the American sitcom Scrubs. It originally aired on May 7, 2002, on NBC.

== Plot ==
Jordan's brother Ben (Brendan Fraser) comes into the hospital after having a wooden board nailed to his hand, to which Ben and Dr. Cox have fun by causing J.D to faint not once but twice from seeing such a gory sight. Dr. Cox and J.D. later become worried when his hand will not stop bleeding. A blood test shows that Ben has leukemia.

A series of paperwork mistakes nearly has Turk operate on the wrong patient, and incorrectly leads Elliot to inform another patient that she's pregnant. J.D. therefore decides to wait before informing Ben of his positive blood test result, and asks the lab to check the result.

They do so, and over a montage accompanied by "Hold on Hope" by Guided by Voices, they discover that Ben is fine. In a stylistic sequence, the staff all gather to watch Ben leave, and pose to have a picture taken. J.D. asks Ben why he let everyone pose for the picture, because he said earlier that posed pictures never look real. However, Ben points out that "none of this is real". The style returns to realism; J.D. is still in the doorway, holding the original diagnosis, and is forced to tell Ben that he has leukemia.

== About the episode ==
This is the first appearance of the character of Ben Sullivan in the show.

== Reception ==
The A.V. Club called Brendan Fraser's acting "a strong performance of a very well-realized character". It also regarded influence of the episode on further storylines and mentioned that "the importance of "My Occurrence" (and next week's "My Hero") has grown in retrospect, but there is plenty of evidence to suggest that "My Occurrence" was pretty special without the benefit of what would follow."

Randy Dankievitch writes that "Occurrence" deals with the idea of mortality and adds that it feels a step below the very best episodes of Scrubs.

BuzzFeed put the episode on fourth place in top 20 Scrubs episodes, stating that "Brendan Fraser fits perfectly into the Scrubs universe" and that "the show reveals Dr. Cox's tender and goofy side through his friendship with Ben".

IGN put episode on the fourth place in the list of top Scrubs episodes, praising "My Occurrence" for "its singular ability to toy with our emotions" and naming it as first in Scrubs' "plenty of gut-wrenching episodes".

CinemaBlend put the episode at position five of best Scrubs episodes, noting that episode "sets up multiple appearances by Brendan Fraser, all of which are both hilarious and heartbreaking".

== Featured music ==
- "Daydreams and Lies" by Keren DeBerg
- "Hold On Hope" by Guided by Voices
