= Joe Rose (American actor) =

American actor and stuntman

- Occupations: Actor, Stuntman
- Years active: 1996–2009

Joe Rose is an American actor and stuntman, most famous for playing Troy in Scrubs.

Rose has also been in many different movies. He played Cole in the film Ghosts Never Sleep and also did stunts for Arizona Werewolf.

== Filmography ==
Film & Television
Year	Film	Role	Notes
1995	Arizona Werewolf	Security Guard	Uncredited
1996	Invisible Temptation	Sturges	
1997	Absolute Force	Parking thug	
1998	The Souler Opposite	Biker Boyfriend	
1999	Kenan & Kel	John 'The Jackhammer' Rogan	TV, "I'm Gonna Get You, Kenan"
1999	The Prophet	Wrestler #2	
2002–2009	Scrubs	Troy	TV, 8 episodes
2003	Cupids	Biker	
2004	Desperate Housewives	Repo Man	TV, "Come Back to Me"
2005	Ghosts Never Sleep	Cole	
