= Carla Espinosa =

- Scrubs character
- First appearance: "My First Day" (2001)
- Created by: Bill Lawrence
- Portrayed by: Judy Reyes

In-universe information
- Gender: Female
- Title: Head Nurse
- Occupation: Registered Nurse
- Family: Mrs. Espinosa (mother, deceased); Marco Espinosa (brother); Gabriella Espinosa (sister); Maria Espinosa (sister); Marie (last name unknown) (aunt, deceased)
- Spouse: Christopher Turk
- Children: Isabella "Izzy" Turk (daughter); Ellie Turk (daughter); Sofia Turk (daughter); Nora Turk (daughter)
- Religion: Roman Catholic
- Nationality: American

Carla Espinosa, RN is a fictional character in the American comedy-drama Scrubs, portrayed by Judy Reyes.

Carla appeared in every episode during the first eight seasons except three Season 8 episodes, "My Happy Place", "My Cookie Pants", and "My Full Moon". She worked as the head nurse at Sacred Heart Hospital, in which the main action of the show takes place.

Judy Reyes was a regular cast member for the first eight seasons, and is the only original cast member not to return for season nine, though her character was still mentioned. According to Donald Faison, who plays Carla's husband Christopher Turk, Carla becomes a stay-at-home mother following the birth of their second daughter, explaining the character's absence from season nine. She returns in the tenth season in a recurring role.

== Profile ==
Judy Reyes describes her character as "sassy, no nonsense". Reyes relied on her sister, a real-life licensed nurse, as an inspiration for character, and to address technical questions Reyes had about nursing and medicine. After watching an episode, Reyes' sister commented, "You stole my character!", referring to Reyes emulating her personality.

== Family life ==
Carla was born in the Dominican Republic but moved to Chicago while still a child. All her family is from the Dominican Republic, despite Turk's frequent and incorrect assertions that she is Mexican or Puerto Rican. It is revealed in Season 5 that she is 36 years old. It is also revealed in the episode "His Story" that Carla's father ran out on the family when Carla was a child.

Carla starts dating Christopher Turk (Donald Faison) in the show's second episode, "My Mentor". They remain together for the entire run of the show. Carla marries Turk in the season finale of season 3, "My Best Friend's Wedding". She and Turk go through a trial separation in season 4 after Carla discovers that Turk is still talking to his ex-girlfriend without telling her he is married. The situation gets worse when she and J.D. share a drunken kiss. Following some couples' therapy and some frank discussions with Turk and J.D., however, the couple reunites. Despite these issues, Judy Reyes believes the characters were made for each other, and set an example for other couples on the show to emulate.

Soon after reconciliation, they start trying to have a child. Initially, they are unsuccessful, but she finally gets pregnant toward the end of the season after several episodes are spent on Turk and Carla worrying about their respective fertility. Carla gives birth to a girl, whom they name Isabella, in the episode "My Best Friend's Baby's Baby and My Baby's Baby". J.D. becomes the godfather of the child. In "My Coffee" when J.D. enters the room that Carla's in with Isabella in her arms, she points to him and says "Isabella, this is the man you will be competing with for your father's love." In "My House", it is revealed that she suffers from post-partum depression. She spends most of the following episode in denial about the condition, but finally gets help after a frank discussion with Jordan Sullivan, who had also suffered from the condition.

Carla announces that she is pregnant for the second time in "My Absence".

She has two sisters and a brother named Marco (Freddy Rodriguez) who hates Turk, and who for years pretended he was unable to speak English in front of Carla. Her mother, who also hates Turk, dies in the episode "My Drama Queen".

In Scrubs season 10, Turk and Carla are still married, now with four daughters, and Carla retains her position as head nurse at Sacred Heart. She still maintains a close friendship with Dr. Cox, with both J.D. and Elliot, in spite of their divorce, and is revealed to also be on friendly terms with attending physician Dr. Kevin Park, in spite of his and J.D.'s mutual dislike of each other.

== Relationships with other characters ==
=== J.D. ===
Carla affectionately nicknames J.D. "Bambi" in season 1, and the nickname sticks. She claims that of all the interns she has worked with, J.D. is the only one whose approval she actually cares about, to the extent that she feigns an interest in black-and-white photography so he would think she is intelligent. She is highly protective of J.D.; when Dr. Cox (John C. McGinley) tears into him in "My Nickname", she is quick to come to his defense and tell off the senior doctor. Unfortunately this leads Cox to publicly embarrass J.D. again, which in turn leads J.D. to blow up at Carla. This results in a heated (albeit brief) fight between the two.

Carla and J.D. are close friends; he even gossips with her "like one of the girls". They even use Mardi Gras beads to signify their friendship and trust shared, almost like a friendship heart necklace. Once J.D. and Carla share a drunken kiss, which leads to some tension between each other and Turk, though this is resolved soon afterward.

In the series finale, a flashforward scene suggests that Carla and J.D. will be friends long into the future, and that Carla and Turk's daughter, Isabella, will get engaged to J.D.'s son Sam.

=== Elliot ===
Early in the series, Carla doesn't feel particularly close to Elliot Reid (Sarah Chalke) but they later become best friends. Series creator Bill Lawrence has said on DVD commentaries that this mirrored Reyes' and Chalke's real-life relationship.

Though they are close, their relationship is not without friction; Carla sometimes resents Elliot's neurotic perfectionism and (unintended) condescension about her family background. Elliot in turn is often annoyed by Carla's bossiness. In "My Lucky Charm", the two get into a vicious "catfight" (much to the delight of the male employees) over what had started as a disagreement over plans of theirs that were flaked on by both Carla and Elliot.

Elliot is a bridesmaid at Carla and Turk's wedding. Before the ceremony, Carla says that she feels closer to Elliot than she does to her own sisters. In "My Cold Shower", she fantasizes (along with all the other main characters) about marrying Elliot and comments that life would be simpler if she did.

=== Dr. Cox ===
Dr. Perry Cox has always had a soft spot for Carla, as she is not afraid to stand up to him. Cox claims that Carla is the only one who 'gets him' and is often very protective of her. During the first season, it is revealed that Dr. Cox has feelings for Carla, but since she is with Turk, he does nothing about it. Before Carla started going out with Turk, she and Cox went on a date together that did not end as he would have liked, but nevertheless strengthened their friendship. Even though Cox detests Turk, he admits that the two of them belong together. When Carla confesses how fearful she is of being a parent, Cox tells her that he knows she'll be a terrific mother. Carla is godmother to Dr. Cox and Jordan's daughter, Jennifer Dylan.
