= Kit Pongetti =

American actress, singer, writer

- Born: Kingsville, Texas, US
- Occupations: Actress, musician, writer, director
- Years active: 1997–present
- Spouse: Mark Stegemann

Kit Pongetti is an American actress, musician, writer and director, known for several acting roles, including playing Lady, the wife of the Janitor, in the show Scrubs and also for her role as Marta Trundel in iCarly.

== Early life ==
Pongetti was born in Kingsville, Texas and soon thereafter moved to Clear Lake, a suburb of Houston, Texas. Her father was a chemical engineer and her mother taught mathematics at Arizona State University. Pongetti graduated from the University of Texas at Austin in 1993 and moved to Los Angeles in 1994.

== Career ==
Pongetti performed in the band Those Who Dig. She began work in Los Angeles as an assistant to writers on the TV Series Roseanne in 1995. Thereafter, she began doing improvisational comedy at The Groundlings Theater, IO West and UCB. She has also performed music that was used in the TV series Gilmore Girls ("My Little Corner of the World", episode "Pilot") and My Boys (episode "Dinner Party"), as well as helping to write and perform a song used in the movie Van Wilder ("Do-Si-Do").

Pongetti devoted herself full-time to acting starting in late 2002. Since that time, she has performed in a variety of commercial and theatrical television and film roles.

In 2011, she was accepted in the AFI's Directing Workshop for Women and her short film Stakeout received AFI's prestigious Nancy Malone Living Trust Award and the Jean Picker Firstenberg Award.

Pongetti co-wrote and directed Don't Stop: The Musical, which performed at Largo at the Coronet Theater from April 2018 to February 2020.

== Filmography ==
=== Film ===
Year	Title	Role	Notes
2003	In Smog and Thunder	Brenda Bounty	
2005	Loudmouth Soup	Kim White	
2006	Invisible	Jane	
2007	Trendsetters	Marcy	Short
2007	Dante's Inferno	Various (voice)	
2009	Weather Girl	Harper	
2011	Victory or Death	Martha Brennan	Short
2016	I Know Jake Gyllenhaal Is Going to Fuck My Girlfriend	Danielle	Short

=== Television ===
Year	Title	Role	Notes
1997	Roseanne	Ticket Taker	"Roseanne-Feld"
2002	8 Simple Rules	Ms. Hunter	"Wings"
2002	Yes, Dear	Nicole	"You're Out... of Dreams"
2003	Yes, Dear	Alex Jaffey (voice)	"The Day of the Dolphin"
2003	Scrubs	Dr. Mitchell	"My Philosophy"
2004	Still Standing	Hostess	"Still Champions"
2004	Reba	Mary Joe	"Brock's Mulligan"
2005	Gilmore Girls	Lucille	"Blame Booze and Melville"
2005	Still Standing	Estelle	"Still Beauty and the Geek"
2006	Rodney	Arlene	"Welcome Ho"
2006	Free Ride	Nurse	"Colon Blow (to the Head)"
2007–2009	Scrubs	Ladinia 'Lady' Williams	Recurring role
2008	My Boys	Margo	"Dinner Party"
2008	Terminator: The Sarah Connor Chronicles	Victoria	"The Tower Is Tall But the Fall Is Short"
2009	How I Met Your Mother	Fran	"Right Place, Right Time"
2009	Greek	Paramedic	"At World's End"
2009	iCarly	Marta Trundel	"iFind Lewbert's Lost Love"
2009–2011	The Cleveland Show	Various (voice)	Recurring role
2010	Men of a Certain Age	Kristina	"Father's Fraternity"
2011	Traffic Light	Sophie	"Credit Balance"
2012	Ground Game	Macy	TV miniseries
2013	The Millers	Gail	"The Mother Is In"
2014	Raising Hope	Christy	"Para-Natesville Activity"
2015	The PET Squad Files	Kitty	"Welcome to F***ing Hollywood"
2015	Chasing Life	Jill Jacobs	"La Dolce Vita"
