= Bob Kelso =

Dr. Robert Kelso, M.D.
- Scrubs character
- First appearance: "My First Day" (2001)
- Last appearance: "Our Driving Issues" (2010) (Note: In 2026, this episode was rendered non-canon along with the rest of the ninth season. Bob Kelso's last canonical appearance is in "My Finale")
- Created by: Bill Lawrence
- Portrayed by: Ken Jenkins

In-universe information
- Nicknames: Bobbo, Bobcat, Boba-Tron
- Gender: Male
- Title: Chief of Medicine
- Occupation: Retired; Formerly; Part-time med school teacher Part-time private practice physician Commander (US Navy)
- Spouse: Enid Kelso (deceased)
- Children: Harrison Kelso; Trong Tri Kelso
- Relatives: Francis (nephew)
- Alma Mater: Stanford University

Robert Kelso, M.D., is a fictional character played by Ken Jenkins in the American comedy-drama Scrubs.

Bob Kelso is the chief of medicine for Sacred Heart Hospital for the first seven seasons of Scrubs (a position held since 1985), though he resigns in the episode "My Dumb Luck". Kelso appeared in every episode during the first eight seasons except three Season 8 episodes, "My Last Words", "Their Story II" and "My Full Moon".

Jenkins was a regular cast member for the first eight seasons, and appeared in nine episodes of season nine.

== Profile ==
Of all the Scrubs characters, he goes through the most pronounced change as the series progresses. In the first few seasons, he appears to be a cynical, heartless man who gives mere lip service to patients' well-being, putting more value on the hospital's bottom line and his own personal comfort. In a moment of brutal candor in the series premiere, Kelso tells series protagonist John "J.D." Dorian, "Do you not realize that you're nothing but a large pair of scrubs to me?" Throughout the series, though, events suggest that Kelso's cynicism is a defense mechanism to deal with the pressures of his position. In later seasons he gradually becomes more compassionate, and after retirement, he remains in the other characters' lives as a grandfatherly figure.

Throughout the series, he is at odds with Dr. Perry Cox (John C. McGinley), Sacred Heart's Chief Attending Physician who eventually replaces him as Chief of Medicine. Cox calls him "Bobbo" or some other variation, often refers to him as a "pod person" or "the Devil himself", and once even punches him out. The two have occasionally shared moments of understanding and compassion, however, such as when Kelso tells a depressed Cox that the hospital and Kelso himself needs him, as they balance each other out to do what is best for the hospital. After his retirement, Kelso becomes more openly friendly with Cox.

His wife, Enid, and children are never seen on the show, although he frequently comments on his spouse, describing her as morbidly obese, neurotic, and using a wheelchair after an accident that left her paralyzed. Enid was a nurse working at the hospital during his early days as an M.D. and he has one child by her, a son called Harrison, a gay, drug-dealing heavy metal fan who wrote a scathing musical about him titled Dr. Dad and "shacked up" with the actor playing Kelso. Kelso also has a secret love child, Trong Tri Kelso, by a Vietnamese woman he had an affair with during his tour in Vietnam. Although he considers his children to be embarrassing, it is shown he genuinely loves Harrison and pays for Trong Tri's college education. He frequently cheats on his wife, and is open about his love of prostitutes. Kelso also suffers from a sexually transmitted disease which he has kept hidden from Enid.

Kelso was born in 1942 in Monroeville, Pennsylvania, where his family, then named Kelsonovich, settled. His father, also a doctor, endeared himself to his poorer patients by accepting gifts such as food and clothing in lieu of actual payment. The elder Kelso was apparently less generous to his own family, however, and he left the family on Kelso's own bicycle (an event to which Kelso attributes his irrational hatred of bikes). Before becoming a doctor, Kelso had a promising career as a shortstop; however, his treatment of other players earned him a permanent ban from the Appalachian League. Kelso attended medical school at Stanford University, graduating 12th in his class in 1968. Kelso was in the United States Navy SEALs during the Vietnam War. He has a tattoo of the word "Johnny" on his buttocks ("...he's an old sailor buddy, and if you went through what we did, you'd understand"). Kelso claimed to have joined Sacred Heart Hospital when he was 26, meaning he likely joined after graduating from Stanford in 1968. He also claimed to have been promoted to Chief of Medicine in 1985.

In the seventh season, he turns 65, which is the hospital's mandatory retirement age. The hospital board of directors begins actively searching for a replacement, but Kelso's forced retirement is headed off with the help of the staff. He then decides to retire on his own terms, after reminiscing with Boon, a new intern, outside of the hospital. Amidst his ramblings, he reveals that he truly does love the hospital and the people who work there. The discussion reveals that the first person he "killed" (a rite of passage for doctors) was a 19-year-old pregnant girl whom he mis-diagnosed. At the end of this episode, he takes one last look at the hospital and drives off into the sunset.

Despite no longer working at Sacred Heart, Kelso remained a series regular. Now that Kelso was no longer a hospital bureaucrat, he reveals himself actually to be a decent human being; he becomes Dr. Cox's confidant, as Cox cannot talk to anyone else about how much he hates his new job. When he sees Cox's and J.D.'s tense interaction, Kelso advises J.D. that his relationship with Cox will be much like the relationship he had, except Cox is now in Kelso's position and J.D. in Cox's position.

In "My Finale", Kelso decides to become a part-time doctor again and leave Sacred Heart for good. After stealing his favorite table from Coffeebucks, he gives J.D. a "proper" good-bye (a handshake) and drives off. The entire staff waves good-bye to Kelso from the hospital's windows before he leaves. One year later, Kelso is still working as a part-time doctor but has now returned to the new Sacred Heart Hospital where he teaches some classes alongside J.D., Turk and Dr. Cox. Kelso does not appear in Season 10, but a wing of the hospital has been named in his honor and his painting still hangs on the wall, showing that he is fondly remembered by his former colleagues.

== Character evolution ==
Kelso has a well-hidden compassion for all his patients, his coworkers, and even his employees. He has claimed in the past to be indifferent to the fact that so many people dislike him, but Cox has noted that deep down Kelso does not like to be thought of as the most hated person in the hospital. In one episode, Kelso reveals that he has always known that his subordinates find ways to treat uninsured people, but pretends not to know to keep the system running and to benefit a friend, Maggie Kent, who has a foot injury. In another, he gives a man without insurance a free stay at the hospital because he finds the man's eight-year-old child to be particularly affable and cannot bring himself to doom the boy's father to certain death right before Christmas, considering it to be his finest moment in medicine. However, when he gives instructions over the phone to keep the uninsured father in the hospital, the person on the other end is skeptical that it really is Kelso speaking. He also sacrifices his own standing with the hospital staff for the good of his patients. For example, when the admission of Iraq War veteran Private Brian Dancer sparks political debate with the staff of Sacred Heart to the point that his health is endangered, Kelso removes the employee discount at the hospital's coffee shop (with the exception of himself) in order to unite the staff once more by giving them someone to hate. Kelso is also shown having to make hard choices that take an emotional toll on him. In one episode he chooses to treat a rich patient at the expense of a poor one, with both having identical symptoms. The poor man dies while the rich man lives, and donates enough money to re-open a pre-natal care program which had to be closed due to budget constraints. However, the decision to allow the poor man to die is shown to affect Kelso to the point that he is visibly saddened when he goes home, though he makes sure to hide this fact from the other employees.

Throughout the series, Kelso delights in tormenting Ted Buckland (Sam Lloyd), the hospital's milquetoast attorney, making him do thankless errands and busy work and denigrating him at every chance. On the day he retires, however, Kelso thanks Ted for all his hard work.

As of season 8, since Kelso no longer has to worry about the hospital, he is revealed to be a decent human being. He becomes Cox's confidant about how much Cox hates his new job, and even starts a "secret friendship" with him. He also encourages J.D. and Elliott to rekindle their relationship. His new attitude seems to change the employees opinions about him, because when he finally leaves the hospital for good, the employees of the hospital wave goodbye to him from the windows.

In the first episode of season 9 it is revealed that Enid died, which Kelso has now gotten over despite it apparently happening two days beforehand. In the following episode, however, he says that part of the reason he is teaching is so that he does not have to spend as much time alone in his empty house. In one episode it is revealed that he is keeping a dorm on the campus as a secret "love nest" because he is unable to bring himself to conduct his affairs in the bed he shared with his wife.

== Impact and cultural criticism ==
Scholars and other authors studying television have used the character of Bob Kelso to explore medical ethics, as an example of "the antithesis of positivity in the workplace," and other issues.
