= Robert Maschio =

American actor

- Born: August 25, 1966 (age 60)
- Education: Columbia University
- Occupation: Actor
- Years active: 1996-present

Robert Maschio (born August 25, 1966) is an American actor and real estate agent. He is known for playing Dr. Todd 'The Todd' Quinlan in the American comedy drama Scrubs.

== Early life ==
He graduated from Columbia University in 1988 with a bachelor's degree in American Politics. He won the Allen J. Willen award for best thesis by a history or political science major.

== Career ==
Maschio made guest appearances on various TV shows such as Bram & Alice, and he eventually landed the role of a hypersexual surgeon in Bill Lawrence's sitcom Scrubs, playing the recurring character of "Dr. Todd 'The Todd' Quinlan". Maschio also guest-starred in another Lawrence production, Spin City, in 1996, and played a jury member in Veronica Mars in 2005. Another role included the rapist Louis Browning on the daytime soap opera As the World Turns in 2006. In 2011, he appeared as Goldman in French comedy film "Hollywoo" with comedienne Florence Foresti.

In addition to his acting career, Maschio presently works as a real estate agent in the Santa Monica area of California.

== Selected filmography ==
Show	Year	Character	Notes
Spin City	1996	Bingo's Partner	Episodes "Dog Day Afternoon"
Spin City	2001	Officer Carney	Episodes "The Perfect Dorm"
Scrubs	2001–2010; 2026–present	Dr. Todd 'The Todd' Quinlan	156 episodes
Date or Disaster	2003	Touch Johnson	Short film
Cuts	2005	Tommy	Episode "Analyze What"
Veronica Mars	2005	Madison Harwell	Episode "One Angry Veronica"
As the World Turns	2006	Louis Browning	16 episodes
Desertion	2008	Michael Sheridan	Movie
Scrubs: Interns	2009	Dr. Todd Quinlan	4 episodes Webseries
The Putt Putt Syndrome	2010	Frank	Movie
Kleshnov	2010	Anthony	Short movie
Hollywoo	2011	Goldman	French language comedy
A Holiday Heist	2011	Harley	Movie
Cougar Town	2012	Dr. Todd Quinlan	Episode "A One Story Town"; Cameo
Men at Work	2013	Dr. Fleming, Hospital ER Doctor	Episode "Uncle Gibbs"
Undateable	2014	Todd	Episode: Danny's Boys
Lethal Seduction	2015	Trevor	Movie
Bones	2015	Peter	Episode: The Promise in the Palace
