= Changes: You Got a Prom Wit Dat? =

- Clone High episode
- Episode no.: Season 1 Episode 13
- Directed by: Harold Harris
- Written by: Phil Lord & Christopher Miller; Bill Lawrence
- Original air dates: March 2, 2003 (Canada); April 14, 2023 (Max)
- Running time: 22 minutes

Guest appearances
- John Stamos as himself; Tommy Walter as himself

Episode chronology
← Previous "Makeover, Makeover, Makeover: The Makeover Episode"	Next → "Let's Try This Again"

"Changes: The Big Prom: The Sex Romp: The Season Finale", originally produced as and retitled on its Max release as "Changes: You Got a Prom Wit Dat?", and alternatively known simply as "Changes", or "Season Finale", is the season finale of the first season of the American animated television sitcom Clone High, written by series co-creators Phil Lord, Christopher Miller, and Bill Lawrence, and directed by Harold Harris. The episode premiered on Teletoon on March 2, 2003, on DVD release on September 20, 2005, and on Max on April 14, 2023. Following the cancellation of Clone High in mid-2003, "Changes" (the initial series finale) served as the final episode featuring Christa Miller as Cleo and Michael McDonald as Gandhi, with the pair being respectively recast and absent for the series' 2023 revival.

Serving as "a two-parter based around The Big Dance" with the preceding episode "Makeover, Makeover, Makeover: The Makeover Episode", the episode picks up as Abe asks out "J-"Cl" to the prom, Gandhi is forced to go stag, and on learning of his "Cloney Island" plan, the Board of Shadowy Figures come to Clone High High School to put an end to Principal Scudworth's plans once and for all. The finale had a generally positive reception when it premiered, although its two-decade status as a cliffhanger-ending series finale (prior to the series' 2023 revival) received some criticism.

== Plot ==
The Narrator: "Tonight, on a very special Clone High… everything you thought was real comes down to this. Old questions will be answered, and new answers will be questioned, on an episode we call… "Changes"."

In the opening scene, immediately after the events of "Makeover, Makeover, Makeover: The Makeover Episode", the "J-"Cl" Abe was asking to prom is revealed to be Cleo. The next day, after failing to get a date, Gandhi forms a "prom posse" with all the other students unable to get dates, while in an attempt to make Abe jealous, Joan accepts JFK's invitation for her to go with prom with him. That night, Abe and JFK both come to pick up Cleo and Joan from their house, and Abe is breathtaken from Joan's appearance. On entering her and JFK's limo, Joan is displeased to find JFK has four other dates for the evening (the clones of Catherine the Great and the Bronte Sisters), although JFK is otherwise completely courteous and respectful towards her, having brought her a corsage.

Meanwhile, as Principal Scudworth prepares for the prom, planning to have himself be made prom king due to painful memories of always being beaten by John Stamos (who considers Scudworth his best friend) when they attended high school together, Mr. Butlertron reminds him that the Board of Shadowy Figures are planning on taking the clones away on prom night, which Scudworth ignores.

At the prom, as Abe is thinking on Joan's appearance, Cleo brings him to the meat locker to have sex as planned, only for him to repeatedly call her Joan instead, leading him to run out. After Abe tells Gandhi about his newfound feelings for Joan outside, he slaps him and tells him Joan had felt the same way all year, before unsuccessfully attempting to seduce the heartbroken Cleo himself, and becoming a couple with Marie Curie. As Scudworth is about to be crowned prom king, an arriving Stamos (invited by Scudworth) enters and is quickly crowned as such again by the student body; after Stamos offers him his crown, a frustrated Scudworth stabs him in the eye with it, which Stamos immediately forgives him for, frustrating Scudworth further.

Meanwhile, Joan and JFK (having left his other dates for her) bond over their emotions, telling her that he prefers her when she's being herself rather than with the "makeover" she got to attract Abe, pointing out that he has bad taste in women. As the Shadowy Figure and his minions arrive, ready to take the clones away, Mr. Butlertron hurriedly takes his vacation time, while Stamos distracts the Shadowy Figure by saying the prom king needs to lead a conga line and tells Scudworth to lead everyone into the flash freezer room. After the conga line starts, Abe, Gandhi, Cleo, and Marie all run into each other, and are shocked to find Joan and JFK in a bed in the freezer, having just had sex. As the conga line floods into the room, Stamos activates the flash freezer as Scudworth escapes. As the clones are frozen, Abe chokes out his last sentence, interrupted by the freezing: "I love…" "J-"Cl" (once again), before the screen cuts to black with "To be continued…?!".

== Production and release ==
Serving as "a two-parter based around The Big Dance" along with the preceding episode "Makeover, Makeover, Makeover: The Makeover Episode", the episode was written by series co-creators Phil Lord, Christopher Miller & Bill Lawrence, and directed by Ted Collyer and Harold Harris, premiering on Teletoon on November 2, 2002, and on MTV on January 20, 2003.

== Reception ==
"Changes" received a generally positive critical reception, although its two-decade status as a cliffhanger series finale received some criticism. Caroline Framke of The A.V. Club lauded the episode for "seamlessly trad[ing] in some of its usual detached distance in favor of some real pathos", in particular for its depiction of the "love quadrangle" soap opera staple and the development of Joan's and JFK's relationship, describing their first date as "just a sweet, quiet scene between two unlikely friends that builds on a season’s worth of development in a completely satisfying way." Further, Framke described "the ending of “Season Finale” [a]s a heartbreaker. [While] Scudworth freezing everyone mid-epiphanies didn’t seem quite so cruel when they first wrote it[...] it’s undeniable that there’s something achingly sad about watching it now with the knowledge that the clones may never thaw out to "laugh and shiver and cry," or more likely trip and grope and snark, or whatever it is they wanted to do after the most important night of their lives (TM Abe). Watching “Season Finale” in retrospect means knowing that in the clones will likely be frozen in time forever—just like the weird little show that gave them life, however brief."

Jacob Oller of Paste Magazine described the series' ending as "the teen drama parody version of the cops coming in to break up a Monty Python sketch [in Monty Python and the Holy Grail…] the most cliffhangery cliffhanger, where there’s not just a freeze frame but a literal freeze that frames the whole cast—and its central relationship question [and] the real pain [being] its symbolism of unachieved potential[…] a hilariously on-the-nose nod to unfulfillment [of] a lame duck finale [that] put all its eggs into one hilariously doomed basket", further noting on the prospect of a revival that "even if it picks up directly where the original series left off—thawing the clones in the modern day, with them picking up their lives as if nothing has happened—it’ll be a bittersweet prize, simply because there are so few TV endings that simultaneously leave us wanting more while laughing at an unfortunately serendipitous punchline[…] so prescient and sarcastically self-referential about its own abrupt ending that its existence and possible revision are both frustrating and exciting."

Ranking the finale as the series' best episode, Sid Natividad of Game Rant described its "too many loose ends [that] were finally tied up" as a "tragedy", that while the series "still had its signature chaos, [the way] it ended [was] on a rather sad and somber note" for its characters in light of the then-lack of a second season. Ana Isis Cisneros of Collider meanwhile complimented the episode's depiction of "heightened emotions and big revelations[…] end[ing] with a bang as Prom night leads to shocking developments that result in a cliffhanger", similarly ranking it as the best episode of the series' first season, and a second season as being "well-deserved".

== Revival ==
Following the 2003 cancellation of Clone High, Phil Lord and Christopher Miller stated in June 2014 that they had "considered" a film adaptation of the series picking up from where the events of "Changes" left, although their current contracts would make it "tricky" to have happen, with their 2018 film Spider-Man: Into the Spider-Verse featuring a "Clone College" film starring Abe and JFK as a film within a film.

In July 2020, it was announced that a revival of the series was in the works at MTV Entertainment Studios, with creators Lord, Miller and Bill Lawrence returning; it was also revealed that original series writer Erica Rivinoja would serve as showrunner of the series, while also co-writing the pilot with Lord and Miller. On February 10, 2021, the series was ordered for two seasons by HBO Max. On June 23, 2021, Christopher Miller revealed the title of the revival's first episode as "Let's Try This Again", picking up with the clones being unfrozen two decades after the events of "Changes". On October 29, 2022, Miller announced the revival would premiere in the first half of 2023. On November 2, 2022, Lord, Miller and new series art director Tara Billinger posted teasers of the show on their Twitter pages. On January 28, 2023, the unfinished first episode of the revival was leaked. On March 24, 2023, it was announced that while a majority of the original cast would be returning, the role of Cleo, originally voiced by white actress Christa Miller, would now be voiced by Mitra Jouhari, while Miller would be playing a new character, Candide Simpson. The character of Gandhi will not be returning due to the controversy the original series faced, making "Changes" the character's last speaking appearance. The revival premiered on May 23, 2023.
