= The Crown: Joancoming: It's a Cleo Cleo Cleo Cleo World =

- Clone High episode
- Episode no.: Season 2 Episode 4
- Directed by: Kristen Morrison
- Written by: Judah Miller
- Original air date: June 1, 2023
- Running time: 22 minutes

Guest appearances
- Jana Schmieding as Sacagawea; Donald Faison as George Washington Carver

Episode chronology
| ← Previous "Anxious Times at Clone High" | Next → "Some Talking but Mostly Songs" |
- Clone High (season 2)

"The Crown: Joancoming: It's a Cleo Cleo Cleo Cleo World", or simply "The Crown", is the fourth episode of the revival of the American animated television sitcom Clone High, written by Judah Miller and directed by Kristen Morrison. The episode premiered on the streaming service Max on June 1, 2023.

The episode stars Nicole Sullivan as Joan, Mitra Jouhari as Cleo, Will Forte as Abe, Christopher Miller as JFK and Mr. Butlertron, Kelvin Yu as Confucius, and Christa Miller as Candide Sampson, where after Joan spreads a rumor derailing Cleo's bid for homecoming queen and Cleo then acquires ancient magical powers, she is forced to reconsider their lifelong rivalry. The episode received a mixed-to-positive reception.

== Plot ==
In the opening scene, in Ancient Florida, 4000 BC, a society of goblin-like creatures discover the "Stone of Eternal Servitude" and forge it into a crown capable of controlling all others, while granting themselves power over mind, matter, and reality itself, before fighting a civil war leading to their extinction. In the present day, Candide Sampson presents the crown to the Secret Board of Shadowy Figures, planning on using it to take over the clones at the upcoming homecoming dance.

While Joan and Frida build a float for homecoming, Cleo runs for homecoming queen, handing out free pumpkin spice lattés and playing the "Instructional Boogie", Joan absentmindedly spreads a rumor to Harriet that Cleo's lattés were made using child labour and blood pumpkins, leading to Cleo being socially cancelled, and Joan is made homecoming queen, alongside her boyfriend JFK, which both Cleo and Joan are shocked by, Joan believing it was because of her rumor, unaware that Candide (her foster mother) actually rigged the vote in her favor, with the crown Joan is about to be crowned with being the "Crown of Eternal Servitude". However, before she can be Crowne, Joan takes the crown and leaves to see to Cleo, who had left crying to the bathroom, and angrily decides to give her the "stupid, basic, pointless, merely symbolic crown" (while remaining quiet about the rumor) and throws it at Cleo, who on putting it on, acquires its many powers, and in a vulnerable place, enhances her beauty to reacclaim her position as the most popular girl in school, and hypnotising Harriet to place her on top of the homecoming float. As Joan walks through the school, the posters around her are altered to depict Cleo, while all the drinking fountain water is replaced with pumpkin spice latté, before noticing everyone in the school seems to be acting like Cleo. Proceeding to the float, Joan finds JFK hynoptised and struggling to break free, and the school to be under Cleo's control.

Joan flees with Confucius to the library, unaffected due to Cleo not noticing he exists, before Confucius asks that he "kill her with kindness" instead, before being retrieved by the hypnotised Abe and JFK. As Joan is about to be taken over by Cleo, Confucius reveals that Cleo started the rumor about her, before Cleo grows to a giant size and criticised Joan for doing so. Aiming to have it be "homecoming forever", Cleo has Joan strung up in the school's American football field, before she is rescued by Mr. Butlertron, who advises that Joan to embrace her truth and repair her relationship with Cleo. Returning to the homecoming dance, Joan uses the "Instructional Boogie" to avoid Cleo's army, before accidentally knocking off Cleo's crown and destroying it. As the crowd is about to turn on Cleo, Joan admits her lie, saying that the lattés were "sourced ethically (unaware they were not, and her "rumor" was true, as Cleo makes an awkward face), both apologising to the crowd and each other. AS Cleo walks away, Joan and JFK make out, Candide and Principal Scudworth wake up and leave, as the "Instructional Boogie" proceeds to break the fourth wall.

== Production and release ==
Christa Miller, recast as Cleo Smith with Mitra Jouhari due to whitewashing concerns, "reprises" the role in the episode via the plot element of Cleo hypnotising Miller's new character.

The episode was written by Judah Miller and directed by Kristen Morrison, premiering on Max simultaneously with the previous episode "Anxious Times at Clone High" on June 1, 2023. The middle part of the episode's title is a portmanteau of the first name of character of Joan of Arc and the concept of a homecoming, with the last part of the title referencing the 1963 comedy film It's a Mad, Mad, Mad, Mad World. Christa Miller, who voiced Cleopatra "Cleo" Smith in the first season of Clone High and Candide Sampson in the revival after being recast with Mitra Jouhari due to retrospective whitewashing concerns, "reprises" the role in the episode via Cleo hypnotising Miller's new character (amongst other characters), who then speaks as Cleo's puppet for the episode's remainder.

== Reception ==
Bubbleblabber complimented the episode's evolution of the "rivalry" between Cleo and Joan of Arc, which while "not end[ing] their stereotypical feud entirely [did have a] suitable mixture of bizarreness and high school drama to further progress Joan's [interpersonal] relationship with Cleo", concluding to describe the episode as "entertaining and hilarious enough to continue the second year of Clone High [in] its concept and strangely amusing scenarios."

In an advance review, Cracked comparatively compared Cleo's series' arc of "can't get[ting] used to a social hierarchy that has someone like Frida [Kahlo] at the top instead of a more traditionally attractive queen bee like herself", culminating in "The Crown" with her takeover of Clone High High School, as a "culture clash" similar to those of the leads of the 2014 film 21 Jump Street, while Comic Book Resources complimented Mitra Jouhari's "interpretation of Cleo [for maintaining Christa] Miller's edge [while going] bigger since Cleo is the clone with the most difficulty adjusting to the modern world and her frustration at the changes to the high school landscape makes for some of the revival's biggest jokes", further complimenting Miller's dynamic with Jouhari as her own new character.

The Workprint praised the episode's "Sousa-esque march" version of "Abandoned Pools' bulletproof, iconic theme" in the episode's opening as "an overlooked and underappreciated [a]dditional canvas rather than a simple banner, praising "get[ting] to spend more time with Cleo" while criticising Jouhari's interpretation of her voice as not "seem[ing] to have that nuanced balance of vanity with vulnerability for me yet," and expressing belief that the series' creative team could have "placed a little more effort into [characterising] the other clones at the Dance [in "The Crown"], teeming the world with life". Similarly, reviewing both "The Crown" and its preceding episode "Anxious Times at Clone High", Episodic Medium criticised "there [being a lack of] enough substance in a given episode to justify a full-length review", as well as the lack of a clear "paradigm shift" in character development episode-to-episode as compared to the previous series. The Game of Nerds lauded the episode's depiction of "Cleopatra retak[ing] the spotlight as one of the main characters", calling it "funny" overall, while expressing criticism of Joan and Cleo's rivalry was used as compared to the original series, concluding that "the rivalry between Cleo and Joan could be far more heated; they were Heather and Gwen from Total Drama before Heather and Gwen [were] a thing!".
