= Escape to Beer Mountain: A Rope of Sand =

- Clone High episode
- Episode no.: Season 1 Episode 1
- Directed by: Ted Collyer
- Original air dates: November 2, 2002 (Canada): January 20, 2003 (United States); Phil Lord and Christopher Miller; Bill Lawrence
- Running time: 22 minutes

Guest appearances
- Michael J. Fox as Gandhi's last kidney; Andy Dick as Van Gogh; Donald Faison as George Washington Carver

Episode chronology
← Previous —	Next → "Episode Two: Election Blu-Galoo"
- Clone High (season 1)

"Escape to Beer Mountain: A Rope of Sand", titled onscreen as "Clone High, USA in the US", is the series premiere of the American animated television sitcom Clone High, written by series co-creators Phil Lord, Christopher Miller, and Bill Lawrence, and directed by Ted Collyer. The episode premiered on Teletoon on November 2, 2002, and on MTV on January 20, 2003.

The series introduces protagonists, Clone High students Abe, Joan, Gandhi, Cleo, and JFK, as Abe hopes to make a move on Cleo at JFK's party, which he has promised to bring beer to, Joan tries to win Abe's heart, setting up a Teen Crisis Hotline which Gandhi works at before ditching for the party, all while Principal Scudworth and Mr. Butlertron plan to crash the party to better understand the students. The pilot had a mixed-to-positive reception when it premiered and was seen by about 1.2 million viewers, later retrospectively receiving critical praise.

== Plot ==
The Narrator: "Tonight, on a very special Clone High"

In the opening scene, at the end of summer vacation, Abe, Joan, and Gandhi return to Clone High (a high school for clones of historical and public figures) for the new school year. As Joan attempts to convince Abe to ask her out, he obliviously ignores her vague wording to ask out his own crush, Cleo, whose ex-boyfriend JFK is hosting a kegger party later that night. Believing Abe to like Cleo because of her "commitment to community service", she tries to gain Abe's attention by starting a "Teen Crisis Hotline" with Gandhi, who sneaks away to go to the party with Abe, who has gotten an invitation in exchange for bringing the beer.

Meanwhile, the Secret Board of Shadowy Figures funding Clone High task its principal, Cinnamon J. Scudworth, to write a report proving he knows what it is like to be a student at Clone High. lest he be executed. After unsuccessfully interrogating Joan, he sends her into his Death Maze before disguising himself and his robotic vice-principal Mr. Butlertron as students and infiltrating JFK’s party. After numerous failed attempts to buy alcohol with Genghis Khan, Abe decides to bring non-alcoholic beer to the party disguised as alcoholic beer. As the clones consume the beer, thinking they are getting drunk, they string up an arriving Scudworth and Mr. Butlertron to use as a piñata, while Gandhi embarrasses Van Gogh by putting his Teen Crisis Hotline call on speakerphone. Arriving at the party, Joan is told by Mr. Butlertron that she has to ask Abe out herself, as he will otherwise not realise her intentions, only to find Abe making out with Cleo, before JFK breaks them up and the pair demand that she choose between them. Leaving the party, Cleo contacts the Teen Crisis Hotline and ends up speaking to Joan, who initially tells her to choose JFK so that she can have Abe to herself, before having an attack of conscience and switching her answer. Cleo then returns to the party and picks Abe. In anger, Joan tasers and pants Gandhi after he makes a sexist comment, as Van Gogh watches from the bushes.

The kegger is suddenly brought to a halt when a small cop car shows, and Gandhi and Joan (as the only two people who can fit in the back of the car) are charged with underage drinking. To prevent them from being arrested, Abe admits to the crowd that the beer was non-alcoholic, before being laughed out of the party on giving an impassioned speech about acceptance. The next day, Scudworth, who has not completed his report, is confronted by the head of the Secret Board, who threatens to kill him before Scudworth tucks into a fetal position and moans about how he was “humiliated, degraded, and judged", unknowingly proving he does know what is like to be a high school student. With his job and his life secure, Scudworth vows to be more sensitive, before immediately insulting two students.

Meanwhile, Abe, depressed on losing Cleo, is cheered up by Gandhi, who says it is only a matter of time before someone else makes a bigger idiot of themselves, and everyone forgets about what Abe did. Moments later, Gandhi becomes this figure, as Van Gogh paints an ad for the Teen Crisis Hotline (titled "TEEN CRISIS HOTLINE: No Problem Too Small!") featuring Gandhi after being tasered/pantsed. At that moment, JFK and Cleo pass by Abe, and Cleo quietly hands Abe a note, reading "Sorry…Luv, Cleo."

== Production and release ==
The episode was written by series co-creators Phil Lord, Christopher Miller & Bill Lawrence, and directed by Ted Collyer, premiering on Teletoon on November 2, 2002, and on MTV on January 20, 2003. The first part of the episode's title is in reference to the 1968 novel and 1975 film Escape to Witch Mountain, while the second part of the title is in reference to a ploy used by Clone High co-creator Christopher Miller to make his university essays "sound more academic and high-minded", referenced in the episode by Scudworth titling his unfinished report "What It's Like To Be A Teenage Clone: A Rope of Sand", and turned into a running gag for the remainder of the season, with every episode titled with a colon followed by a phrase.

== Reception ==
=== Initial reviews ===
Scott Sandell of the Los Angeles Times felt the as a debut episode, "Escape to Beer Mountain: A Rope of Sand" felt lacking, saying: "The problem is that the first episode, which focuses on crushes and beer, doesn't quite live up to the obvious comedic potential behind the killer premise." Similarly, The Hollywood Reporter's Michael Farkash wrote that "The premise sounds intriguing, but what hatches in the first episode is a disappointing, weak strain of comic material, lacking the cunning, subversive quality of, say, South Park."

==== Gandhi controversy ====
The characterisation of Gandhi (voiced by Michael McDonald) as a "party animal" was negatively received in India.

The episode's introduction of Gandhi as a "party animal" received negative reception in India, culminating in a 150-person hunger strike held outside of MTV's Indian branch in early 2003, and the consequent cancellation of Clone High, before it was eventually revived in 2023 (without the Gandhi character).

=== Retrospective reviews ===
Reviewing the first episode of Clone High in a retrospective on the careers of Phil Lord and Christopher Miller, Kevin Noonan of The Observer lauded it as "a perfect parody of high school dramas with humor that hits hard and often, but it goes above and beyond easy parody jokes, making for a consistently funny, frequently brilliant comedy". Caroline Framke of The A.V. Club similarly complimented the episode as a pilot for "pok[ing] fun at the histrionics of high school drama, especially at how the smallest things become world-altering nightmares inside the mind of a hormonal teen [and] then subvert[ing] the expected resolutions to the conflicts that would get tied up in a neat, unrealistic bow on something like Dawson's Creek", further lauding its ending, in which "poor Joan [sees] Abe and Cleo making out [to] a close-up of her shocked face as the soundtrack smash cuts" as being "the perfect blend of irreverent and affectionate[…] pok[ing] fun at the do or die nature of a high school crush while also letting Joan have a truly heartbreaking moment [in an] absurd, soul-crushing, melodramatic, and ultimately, hilarious—like living through high school all over again."

Joe Reid of Decider praised the premiere as "ma[king] history come alive with teen angst", serving as a solid introduction to "such an odd premise with economy and humor", while also featuring "my all-time favorite joke in a TV show ever, featuring George Washington Carver and a peanut.", while ranking the episode as the 10th-best in the first season of Clone High, Ana Isis Cisneros of Collider praised the episode as "do[ing] a great job at establishing the tone and premise of the show while introducing each of its main characters with their goals and worries", noting that while the episode "doesn't fully live up to the comedy potential of the setting, it is still a humorous episode on its own, with the kind of fun gags that would become the series' staple."
