= Three Busy Debras =

American comedy television series (2020–2022)

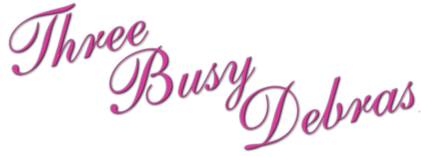
- Genre: Surreal humor
- Created by: Sandy Honig; Alyssa Stonoha; Mitra Jouhari
- Written by: Sandy Honig (pilot and season 1); Alyssa Stonoha (pilot and season 1); Mitra Jouhari (pilot and season 1)
- Directed by: Anna Dokoza
- Starring: Sandy Honig; Alyssa Stonoha; Mitra Jouhari
- Narrated by: Catherine Cohen (season 1); Geraldine Viswanathan (season 2)
- Theme music composer: Joshua Moshier
- Composers: Joshua Moshier; Steve Pardo
- Country of origin: United States
- Original language: English
- No. of seasons: 2
- No. of episodes: 16 (and 1 unaired pilot)

Production
- Executive producers: Amy Poehler; Kim Lessing; Sandy Honig; Alyssa Stonoha; Mitra Jouhari; Anna Dokoza; Mark Costa (Note: Mark Costa is executive producer for Alive and Kicking, Inc.); Keith Crofford (Note: Keith Crofford and Walter Newman are executive producers for Williams Street.) (Season 1); Walter Newman
- Producers: Jonathan Caso; Lacey Leavitt; Ingrid Lageder (Note: Lageder is co-producer.)
- Production locations: Seattle, Washington
- Cinematography: Nathan M. Miller
- Editors: Jonathan Kramer; Brendan Walsh; Martine Charnow; Rylan Rafferty
- Camera setup: Single-camera
- Running time: 11 minutes
- Production companies: Alive and Kicking, Inc.; Mail Lizard; Paper Kite Productions; Williams Street

Original release
- Network: Adult Swim
- Release: March 30, 2020 – May 23, 2022

Three Busy Debras is a surreal comedy television series created by Sandy Honig, Alyssa Stonoha, and Mitra Jouhari. It premiered on Cartoon Network's late-night programming block, Adult Swim, on March 30, 2020 and ended on May 23, 2022, with a total of 16 episodes over the course of 2 seasons.

== Premise ==
Three Busy Debras follows "the surreal day-to-day lives of three deranged housewives, all named Debra, in their affluent suburban town of Lemoncurd."

== Cast ==
- Sandy Honig as Debra, the self-proclaimed leader of the Debras, the oldest and the meanest of the three. She is portrayed as a mean-spirited control freak. She usually wears a dress.
- Alyssa Stonoha as Debra, the "middle Debra" who is aloof and emotionally distant. She is trapped in a loveless marriage and has no attachment to her young son Trayden. She usually wears a pantsuit.
- Mitra Jouhari as Debra, a widow who is incredibly clingy to whoever gives her attention. She is often the target of abuse for the other Debras. She usually wears a romper.

== Production ==
The concept originally began as a play which was created by and starred Mitra Jouhari, Sandy Honig, and Alyssa Stonoha. It was later extended to a web series. On May 8, 2018, Adult Swim announced that it had ordered a pilot of the show, written by Sandy Honig and directed by Anna Dokoza. On May 7, 2019, Adult Swim gave the quarter hour comedy a series order.

On February 12, 2020, it was announced that the series would premiere on March 29, 2020.

The show was executive produced by Amy Poehler and Kim Lessing through Paper Kite Productions. Show creators Sandy Honig, Mitra Jouhari, Alyssa Stonoha and director Anna Dokoza also served as executive producers through Mail Lizard. Alive and Kicking, Inc. produced the series.

The creators have cited a number of influences on the show, including SpongeBob SquarePants, The Real Housewives, Garth Marenghi's Darkplace, Clue and Looney Tunes.

On May 31, 2020, Adult Swim renewed the series for a second season. On July 26, 2022, it was announced that the show would not be returning for a third season.

== Episodes ==
=== Series overview ===
Season	Episodes	Originally released	
Season	Episodes	First released	Last released
Pilot		Unaired	
1	6	March 30, 2020	May 4, 2020
2	10	April 25, 2022	May 23, 2022

=== Pilot ===
Title	Directed by	Written by	Original release date
"Pilot"	Anna Dokoza	Sandy Honig, Alyssa Stonoha & Mitra Jouhari	Unaired

=== Season 1 (2020) ===
No. overall	No. in season	Title	Directed by	Written by	Original release date	U.S. viewers (millions)
1	1	"A Very Debra Christmas"	Anna Dokoza	Sandy Honig, Alyssa Stonoha & Mitra Jouhari	March 30, 2020	0.525
The ladies set out to do damage control after killing Debra's pool boy.
2	2	"Cartwheel Club"	Anna Dokoza	Sandy Honig, Alyssa Stonoha & Mitra Jouhari	April 6, 2020	0.549
Debra, Debra, and Debra all try out for a club, and only Debra and Debra get in.
3	3	"Sleepover!"	Anna Dokoza	Sandy Honig, Alyssa Stonoha & Mitra Jouhari	April 13, 2020	0.515
Debra and Debra have a sleepover at Debra's house.
4	4	"Barbra"	Anna Dokoza	Sandy Honig, Alyssa Stonoha & Mitra Jouhari	April 20, 2020	0.552
Debra and Debra befriend Debra's sister Barbra.
5	5	"ATM (All the Money)"	Anna Dokoza	Sandy Honig, Alyssa Stonoha & Mitra Jouhari	April 27, 2020	0.502
A naturally occurring ATM starts erupting free money into the Lemoncurd economy. Everyone is thrilled, except for the Debras.
6	6	"Debspringa"	Anna Dokoza	Sandy Honig, Alyssa Stonoha & Mitra Jouhari	May 4, 2020	0.618
Each Debra lives a different life for a day per their annual tradition of "Debspringa" (their take on the Amish tradition of Rumspringa). Debra becomes a politician, Debra becomes a high school student and Debra has a romantic fling with her brother.

=== Season 2 (2022) ===
No. overall	No. in season	Title	Directed by	Written by	Original release date	US viewers (millions)
7	1	"The Milk Drought"	Kati Skelton	Mitra Jouhari	April 25, 2022	0.265
The Debras learn that Lemoncurd is experiencing a milk drought and head to the milk reservoir to take all the milk they deserve.
8	2	"The Great Debpression"	Maegan Houang	Mitra Jouhari	April 25, 2022	0.195
Debra wakes up Debpressed, which doesn’t work for Debra and Debra.
9	3	"The Honorable Order of the Debras"	Maegan Houang	Alyssa Stonoha	May 2, 2022	0.201
When Debra goes missing, Debra and Debra must step in to save her before it's too late, or worse.
10	4	"To Have Debra, To Hold Debra"	Kati Skelton	Alyssa Stonoha	May 2, 2022	0.153
A story in three brunches.
11	5	"Operation: Seal Team Debra"	Kati Skelton	Sarah Sherman	May 9, 2022	0.225
Debra gets a hobby, and Debra and Debra really don't like that for her.
12	6	"Who Has Done It?"	Jake Honig	Sandy Honig	May 9, 2022	0.165
It was a dark and stormy night. Or was it? Find out on this week's episode of Three Busy Debras. Or will you?
13	7	"Debra Gets a Boyfriend"	Sandy Honig	Evan Waite	May 16, 2022	0.221
Debra falls in love while Debra and Debra take a well-deserved day off.
14	8	"Women's History Hour"	Sandy Honig	Mitra Jouhari & Diana Tay	May 16, 2022	0.181
It's Women's History Hour, and the children of Lemoncurd aren't happy about it.
15	9	"Nonna"	Jake Honig	Alyssa Stonoha	May 23, 2022	0.221
Debra, Debra, and Debra meet Nonna at Nonna's Nonnaria. Mamma mia!
16	10	"The Meteor"	Jake Honig	Mitra Jouhari	May 23, 2022	0.206
Debra, Debra, and Debra come to terms with their own mortality as a very rude meteor hurtles toward Lemoncurd.
