= Eat With Me =

2014 film

- Directed by: David Au
- Written by: David Au, Mark Neal
- Starring: Sharon Omi, Edward Chen (as Teddy Chen Culver), Nicole Sullivan, Aiden Bristow, George Takei
- Cinematography: Amanda Treyz
- Music by: Stephen Krolikowski, Joshua Noteboom
- Release date: 2014
- Running time: 95 minutes
- Country: United States
- Language: English

Eat With Me is a 2014 film directed by David Au about a fraught relationship between a mother and her gay son. It is a feature-length movie based on the short film Fresh Like Strawberries.

== Plot ==
Elliot runs a failing Chinese restaurant. His mother Emma finds herself in a loveless marriage. After leaving her husband, Emma attempts to reconnect with Elliot through homecooked food. Elliot's meddling neighbour, Maureen, helps Emma grow and accept her son.

== Cast ==
- Sharon Omi as Emma
- Edward Chen as Elliot (credited as Teddy Chen Culver)
- Nicole Sullivan as Maureen
- Aiden Bristow as Ian
- George Takei as George

== Reception ==
As of July 2026, Eat With Me has a 57% rating on Rotten Tomatoes' Popcornmeter audience score.
