= Clone High =

American-Canadian adult animated television series

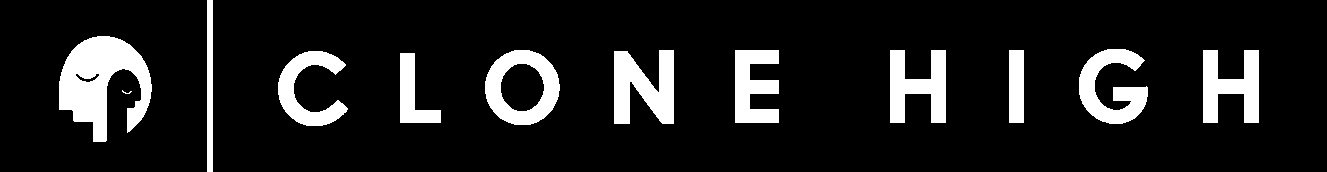
- Genre: Animated sitcom; Satire; Sci-fi
- Created by: Phil Lord; Christopher Miller; Bill Lawrence
- Voices of: Will Forte; Phil Lord; Michael McDonald; Christa Miller; Christopher Miller; Nicole Sullivan; Neil Casey; Ayo Edebiri; Mitra Jouhari; Vicci Martinez; Kelvin Yu
- Theme music composer: Tommy Walter
- Opening theme: "Master (Clone High Theme)"
- Composers: Jamie Dunlap; Scott Nickoley; Tommy Walter
- Countries of origin: United States; Canada (season 1)
- Original language: English
- No. of seasons: 3
- No. of episodes: 33

Production
- Executive producers: Phil Lord; Christopher Miller; Bill Lawrence; John Miller; Erica Rivinoja; Erik Durbin; Corey Campodonico; Alex Bulkley; Jeff Ingold; Michael Hirsh; Scott Dyer; Toper Taylor
- Producers: Kim Cleary; Jessica Lamour; Matt Marshal; Aubrey Lee
- Editors: Michael T. Elias; Ron Babcock; Molly Yahr
- Running time: 22−28 minutes
- Production companies: MTV Animation; Doozer Productions, Inc.; Lord Miller Productions; Touchstone Television (season 1); Nelvana (season 1); MTV Networks (season 1); ShadowMachine (seasons 2–3); MTV Entertainment Studios (seasons 2–3)

Original release
- Network: MTV (United States); The Detour on Teletoon (Canada)
- Release: November 2, 2002 – April 13, 2003
- Network: Max
- Release: May 23, 2023 – February 1, 2024

Clone High (Clone High, USA in the United States) is an American animated sitcom created by Phil Lord, Christopher Miller, and Bill Lawrence for MTV. It premiered on November 2, 2002, in Canada, and January 20, 2003, in the United States. Set in a fictional high school populated by the clones of well-known historical figures, the series follows its central cast which includes adolescent depictions of Abraham Lincoln, Joan of Arc, Mahatma Gandhi, Cleopatra and JFK. The series also serves as a parody of teen dramas such as Dawson's Creek, Degrassi, and Beverly Hills, 90210; every episode is humorously introduced as a "very special episode" with narration provided by Will Forte.

Lord and Miller first developed the series' concept, originally titled Clone High School, USA!, while at Dartmouth College in the 1990s, later pitching it to executives of the Fox Broadcasting Company during their tenure at Disney, who ultimately decided to pass on the program. The rights were purchased by Viacom International to air on their cable channel MTV, producing the series between 2002 and 2003; Disney's television arm Touchstone Television retains a production credit. The show's design is heavily stylized and its animation style is limited, emphasizing humor and story over visuals. The Clone High theme song, "Master (Clone High Theme)", was written by Tommy Walter and performed by his alternative rock band Abandoned Pools. The series was produced by its co-creator Bill Lawrence, who also produced Scrubs, Spin City and Cougar Town. Many Scrubs alumni, such as Zach Braff, Donald Faison, Sarah Chalke, John C. McGinley, Neil Flynn, and Christa Miller, provided the voices of characters in Clone High for free, with Flynn also reprising his role from Scrubs as the Janitor (Glenn) in a recurring role. Writing and voice work were done at North Hollywood Medical Center, where Scrubs was filmed.

The first season premiered on now-defunct Canadian cable channel Teletoon's late-night programming block The Detour on Teletoon on November 2, 2002, and MTV in the United States on January 20, 2003. It became embroiled in controversy regarding its depiction of Gandhi soon afterward, which prompted over 100 people in India to mount a hunger strike in response from India's parliament members and Gandhi's great-grandson. Shortly after, MTV canceled the series, which had been receiving low ratings; the last episodes of the first season were seen in 2016 on the rebranded MTV Classic in the United States. Clone High received mixed reviews from television critics upon its premiere, but it has since received critical acclaim and a cult following.

On July 2, 2020, it was announced that a revival of the series was in development at MTV Entertainment Studios with the creators Lord, Miller, and Lawrence returning. On February 10, 2021, it was announced that HBO Max had ordered two seasons of the revival, which premiered on May 23, 2023. The second season of the revival (third season overall) premiered with all ten episodes on February 1, 2024. On July 26, 2024, the revival of the series was canceled after two seasons, leaving the series on another cliffhanger.

== Premise ==
Clone High is set in a high school in the fictional town of Exclamation, USA, that is secretly being run as an elaborate military experiment orchestrated by a government office called the Secret Board of Shadowy Figures. The school is entirely populated by the clones of famous historical figures who were created in the 1980s and raised with the intent of having their different strengths and abilities harnessed by the United States military. The principal of the high school, mad scientist Cinnamon J. Scudworth, who wants to use the clones to create a clone-themed amusement park, dubbed "Cloney Island", has his plans for the clones and secretly tries to undermine the wishes of the Board. He is assisted by his robot butler/vice principal/dehumidifier, Mr. Butlertron, who is programmed to call everyone "Wesley" and speak in three distinct intonations.

The show centers on the clones of five famous figures: Abe Lincoln, Joan of Arc, Cleopatra, JFK, and Gandhi. The central plot of the show revolves around the clones going through day-to-day struggles and navigating boundaries. The show also involves Abe having to either realize and reciprocate the feelings of Joan of Arc, who is attracted to him, or stay with the vain and promiscuous clone of Cleopatra. Meanwhile, JFK's clone, a macho, narcissistic womanizer, is also attempting to win over Cleopatra and has a long-standing rivalry with Abe.

=== Characters ===
==== Season 1 ====
The original main characters of Clone High: Mr. Butlertron, JFK, Cleopatra, Abe Lincoln, Joan of Arc, Gandhi and Cinnamon J. Scudworth (reclining).

- Abe Lincoln (voiced by Will Forte) is a clone of Abraham Lincoln and the main protagonist. He admires his "clonefather" Abraham Lincoln and feels that he is struggling to live up to him. He is in love with Cleopatra, and has an awkward and honest personality. Abe does not notice that Joan has feelings for him and unintentionally mistreats her by reinterpreting her advances as a sign of friendship.
- Joan of Arc (voiced by Nicole Sullivan) is a clone of Joan of Arc and Abe's closest friend and confidante. She is an intelligent, cynical, and angsty goth. She secretly has a crush on Abe and resents how he ignores her advances in favor of hooking up with Cleopatra. She holds progressive political views, and "somewhat naively support[s] every special-interest cause".
- Cleopatra "Cleo" Smith (voiced by Christa Miller in season 1, Mitra Jouhari in seasons 2-3) is a clone of Cleopatra VII and a self-absorbed, vain, and often mean-spirited popular cheerleader. Cleo exerts power over everyone using her appearance and intelligence. She has relationships with both JFK and Abe. She becomes Joan of Arc's foster sister when Cleopatra's foster mother begins dating Joan's foster grandfather. Her animation and character design are inspired by the depiction of people in Ancient Egyptian wall painting, drawn in profile with eyes highlighted by eyeliner.
- JFK (voiced by Christopher Miller) is a clone of John F. Kennedy and a handsome, popular, arrogant, and horny jock, as well as Abe's on-and-off rival for Cleo's affections. He speaks with a Boston accent and pursues women, whom he calls "broads".
- Gandhi (season 1, voiced by Michael McDonald) is a clone of Mahatma Gandhi and Abe's other best friend. He, like Abe, is struggling to live up to his "clonefather" Mahatma Gandhi. As a result, he rebelled against his "clonefather" and reinvents himself as a wild party animal and serves as the show's comic relief. Gandhi sees himself as a music artist and calls himself the "G-Man". He did not return in the revival series after members of India's parliament protested Clone High's depiction of Gandhi in 2003, shown to be still frozen in 2023 (with Abe not noticing his absence, and Joan not remembering him at all due to the memory wipe machine used on all clones).
- Principal Cinnamon J. Scudworth (voiced by Phil Lord) is a mad scientist and the principal of Clone High, who initially secretly plans to use the clones as attractions for his hypothetical amusement park, dubbed "Cloney Island", and many of the series' subplots surround him trying to find ways to accelerate his plans. After these plans are thwarted, he freezes his original batch of clones for twenty years, immediately resuming Clone High in the adjoining years with new clones. Scudworth is usually the focus of the subplots of the show.
- Mr. Besley Lynn Butlertron (voiced by Christopher Miller) is Principal Scudworth's Mr. Belvedere-esque sane robotic butler and reluctant sidekick.

==== Seasons 2-3 ====
- Candide Sampson (voiced by Christa Miller) is Principal Scudworth's strict, cold-hearted superior in the second and third season, put in charge by the Secret Board of Shadowy Figures as running Operation Spread Eagle. Principal Scudworth is shown to have a romantic interest in her. She is revealed to be Joan's new foster mother in "Sleepover".
- Frida Kahlo (voiced by Vicci Martinez) is a clone of Latin artist Frida Kahlo, who is the most popular of the second generation of clones. She is shown to be a fan of skateboarding. She is a separate clone from the Frida Kahlo clone in the first season who appeared as a background character.
- Harriet Tubman (voiced by Ayo Edebiri) is a clone of Black American abolitionist Harriet Tubman, who is very preppy and Frida's best friend with dyed hair. She is a separate clone from the Harriet Tubman clone voiced by Debra Wilson in the first season.
- Confucius (voiced by Kelvin Yu) is a clone of Asian philosopher Confucius, who is infatuated with online and many social media trends. He is a separate clone from the Confucius clone in the first season who appeared as a background character.
- Topher Bus (voiced by Neil Casey) is a clone of Italian explorer Christopher Columbus, who tries to distance himself from his "clone-father" by shortening his name and appearing to be supportive of social movements and trends. This appears to be a façade, as he is shown to troll people online through anonymous, offensive comments.

== Episodes ==
| Season | Episodes | Originally released | | |
| Season | Episodes | First released | Last released | Network |
|---|---|---|---|---|
| 1 | 13 | November 2, 2002 | April 13, 2003 | Teletoon (Canada); MTV (United States) |
| 2 | 10 | May 23, 2023 | June 22, 2023 | Max |
| 3 | 10 | February 1, 2024 | | Max |

=== Season 1 (2002–03) ===
This was the only season to be created in traditional digital ink-and-paint animation by Rough Draft Studios.

| No. overall | No. in season | Title | Directed by | Written by | Canadian air date | U.S. air date |
|---|---|---|---|---|---|---|
| 1 | 1 | "Escape to Beer Mountain: A Rope of Sand" | Ted Collyer | Phil Lord, Christopher Miller & Bill Lawrence | November 2, 2002 | January 20, 2003 |
In desperation to be with the beautiful and popular Cleopatra, Abe Lincoln is hoping to make a move on her at JFK's party. JFK, however, also has the hots for Cleo and will only let Abe come on the condition that he brings beer for everyone. Meanwhile, Joan of Arc, who is trying to win Abe's heart, starts up a Teen Crisis Hotline in an attempt to impress him with her commitment to community service; their mutual friend, Gandhi, who accidentally agrees to help with the hotline, forwards the calls to his cell phone so he can go to the party. All the while, Principal Scudworth and Mr. Butlertron attempt to crash the party so as to better understand the students. Guest stars: Michael J. Fox as Gandhi's remaining kidney, Andy Dick as van Gogh and Donald Faison as George Washington Carver
| 2 | 2 | "Episode Two: Election Blu-Galoo" | Harold Harris | Phil Lord & Christopher Miller | November 3, 2002 | January 27, 2003 |
Cleo discovers she cannot continue to run for Student Body President because of term limits, so she convinces JFK to run on her behalf, and when Abe sees that Cleo appreciates leaders, he decides to run as well. But students of Clone High do not care about real issues, and many are infatuated with JFK; Abe employs a corporate sponsor, "X-Stream Blu," to jazz up his campaign. The only problem is that Gandhi becomes horribly addicted to this mysterious food product. Guest stars: Marilyn Manson as himself, Sarah Chalke as X-stream Erin, Donald Faison as X-stream Bob and Zach Braff as X-stream Mike
| 3 | 3 | "A.D.D.: The Last 'D' is for Disorder" | Harold Harris | Tom Martin | November 10, 2002 | February 3, 2003 |
When Gandhi is diagnosed with Attention Deficit Disorder (A.D.D.), the students of Clone High begin to ostracize him. Abe must decide whether to please Cleo by doing the same, or to stand up for his "best dude 4 ever" and lose any chance of being with Cleo. Meanwhile, Joan struggles with living up to the legacy of her 15th century clone mother, and begins hearing strange religious voices in her head. Also, Principal Scudworth starts wearing Mr. Butlertron's sweater vest, in the belief that it gives him the power to relate to the students of Clone High. Guest stars: Zach Braff as Paul Revere, Donald Faison as Toots and Tom Green as himself
| 4 | 4 | "Film Fest: Tears of a Clone" | Ted Collyer | Erica Rivinoja | November 17, 2002 | February 10, 2003 |
When Abe decides to organize a Clone High Student Film Festival, he spends much time working on a movie about a misunderstood football-playing giraffe; Cleo stars in an autobiographical epic about how difficult it is to be as perfect and glamorous as her; Joan directs an avant-garde film which expresses her love for Abe through psychoanalytic dream imagery; and Gandhi and George Washington Carver work together to make a comedic mixed-race buddy cop action comedy called Black and Tan. Meanwhile, JFK plans a film but never manages to leave the casting couch with his various would-be female co-stars, and Principal Scudworth starts to panic when his bosses on the Secret Board of Shadowy Figures invite themselves to his house for dinner, but thankfully for him, Mr. Butlertron is there to save the day. Guest stars: Donald Faison as George Washington Carver and Neil Flynn as Boy auditioning for Abe's film
| 5 | 5 | "Sleep of Faith: La Rue D'Awakening" | Ted Collyer | Murray Miller & Judah Miller | December 1, 2002 | February 17, 2003 |
The PXJTs (a parody of the SATs or PSATs) are right around the corner, but Abe is losing sleep running errands for his beloved Cleo. When Joan keeps trying to warn Abe about his sleep deprivation, a secret of hers is uncovered. Also, Gandhi, overwhelmed by the pressure of studying, decides to not take the test and become a trucker instead. Mr. Butlertron and an old foe battle it out for the last time. Guest star: John C. McGinley as Doug Prepcourse
| 6 | 6 | "Homecoming: A Shot in D'Arc" | Harold Harris | Eric Kentoff | November 24, 2002 | February 24, 2003 |
Since the CHHS basketball team refuses to allow girls or animals to play, the athletic Joan decides to cleverly disguise herself as "John D'Arc", becoming the star player. Cleo then falls for D'Arc, making team-captain Abe "Weakest"-Lincoln jealous. But Cleo's not the only one falling for D'Arc, as fellow athlete JFK finds himself having confusingly sexual feelings about the whole affair. Meanwhile, Gandhi and Genghis Khan kidnap the mascot of Clone High's rival school, Genetically Engineered Superhuman High. Guest stars: Chris Berman as himself, Dan Patrick as himself and Neil Flynn as Julius Caesar
| 7 | 7 | "Plane Crazy: Gate Expectations" | Harold Harris | Tom Martin | December 8, 2002 | March 3, 2003 |
Abe and Cleo's new relationship is threatened when she is picked to be on a Canadian Spring Break Dance show, hosted by Ashley Angel from O-Town. Meanwhile, Gandhi becomes an international rap sensation with the help of JFK as his manager. Also, Principal Scudworth is constantly being tricked by a pesky skunk. Guest stars: Ashley Angel as himself and Neil Flynn as Buddy Holly
| 8 | 8 | "A Room of One's Clone: The Pie of the Storm" | Ted Collyer | Adam Pava | December 15, 2002 | 2016 (MTV Classic) |
Storm's-a-brewin' when Joan's house burns down and her family has no choice but to move in with Cleo's, where conflict ensues; Abe attends a Conflict Mediation Seminar to learn how to more effectively resolve disputes between the two. Gandhi and JFK find themselves in escalating arguments. Meanwhile, Mr. Butlertron becomes jealous when Principal Scudworth forms a relationship with a robotic toy dog. Guest stars: Donald Faison as Martin Luther King Jr. and Toots and Neil Flynn as Moses
| 9 | 9 | "Raisin the Stakes: A Rock Opera in Three Acts" | Ted Collyer | Phil Lord & Christopher Miller | January 12, 2003 | March 10, 2003 |
After an anti-drugs assembly at the school, a rumor goes around that one can get high smoking raisins, leading the clones to embark on a musical, mystical journey of intoxication and irresponsibly long hair. Sober Joan is trying to keep Abe from turning into a drugged-out hippie, while Principal Scudworth and the PTA build a giant wall in an attempt to fence the students in. Meanwhile, Gandhi goes on a raisined-out subconscious mindtrip where he encounters a hummingbird-unicorn-donkey creature, a two-headed Olsen Twins monster, a talking Italian pencil, and a stereotypically Australian dragon, on his quest to rescue a princess whom he believes will have sex with him. Guest star: Jack Black as Larry Hardcore/the Pusher
| 10 | 10 | "Litter Kills: Litterally" | Harold Harris | Murray Miller & Judah Miller | January 19, 2003 | 2016 (MTV Classic) |
JFK's long time best friend, Ponce de León, literally dies, causing JFK to sink into a spiral of depression. This causes tension between Abe and Cleo, who dutifully attempts to comfort JFK, her former boyfriend, during his grief. Meanwhile, Gandhi is mistakenly sent to death row where he has trouble getting high fives, but makes new friends in the showers. Guest stars: Luke Perry as Ponce and Neil Flynn as Glenn the Janitor and Julius Caesar
| 11 | 11 | "Snowflake Day: A Very Special Clone High Holiday Special" "Snowflake Day: A Very Special Holiday Episode" | Harold Harris | Erica Rivinoja | April 13, 2003 | 2016 (MTV Classic) |
It's the politically correct Snowflake Day season, and everyone is in the holiday spirit, except for Joan, who is against the commercialism of the made-up holiday. But a homeless urchin who "may or may not be" pop sensation Mandy Moore teaches Joan an important lesson. Meanwhile, Abe and Gandhi attempt to invent and market an interesting device, so that Abe will have money to buy Cleo an expensive Snowflake Day gift. Guest star: Mandy Moore as herself Note: This episode did not air during the original run of the series, as Teletoon normally did not air holiday themed episodes outside of the holiday time period. However, they made an exception after multiple viewer requests, and released the episode as part of the second airing.
| 12 | 12 | "Makeover, Makeover, Makeover: The Makeover Episode" | Ted Collyer | Eric Kentoff | January 26, 2003 | 2016 (MTV Classic) |
With prom not too far away, Abe wants to ask his girlfriend, Cleo, but cannot stop thinking about Joan's prom date situation. Meanwhile, Gandhi goes on a desperate search for a date. So, Abe and Cleo each have a go at making over Joan for prom, JFK gives Gandhi a makeover, and Mr. B gives Scudworth a makeover to help him execute a sinister, evil plan to "win" the prom king vote.
| 13 | 13 | "Changes: You Got a Prom Wit Dat?" "Changes: The Big Prom: The Sex Romp: The Season Finale" | Harold Harris | Phil Lord & Christopher Miller | March 2, 2003 | 2016 (MTV Classic) |
As all the clones are preparing for the winter prom, Abe decides whether to ask Cleo or Joan; Gandhi concocts a brilliant plan to find dates for all the school geeks; and Principal Scudworth attempts to execute his sinister, evil plan, while the Secret Board of Shadowy Figures prepares to abduct the clones on prom night to advance their own evil plan. Guest stars: John Stamos as himself and Tommy Walter as himself

=== Season 2 (2023) ===
Seasons 2 and 3 were produced in Flash animation by ShadowMachine and animation services were done by Jam Filled Entertainment.

| No. overall | No. in season | Title | Directed by | Written by | Original release date |
|---|---|---|---|---|---|
| 14 | 1 | "Let's Try This Again" | Mark Ackland | Phil Lord, Christopher Miller & Erica Rivinoja | May 23, 2023 |
Twenty years after the Homecoming Prom, the clones are unfrozen by the Secret Board of Shadowy Figures as part of their plan: Operation Spread Eagle. Abe, Joan, JFK, Cleo, and the rest of the 2002 clones (minus Gandhi who remains frozen) head back to Clone High and meet newer clones that were secretly created by Scudworth during the 20 years that they were frozen. The clones attempt to adapt to the new norms, such as Abe grappling with cancel culture, though Joan enjoys her newfound friendship with Frida Kahlo and Harriet Tubman. Meanwhile, Scudworth has to deal with his new supervisor: Candide Sampson.
| 15 | 2 | "Sleepover" | Mark Ackland | Marlena Rodriguez | May 23, 2023 |
After having an embarrassing wet dream in class involving Abe, Joan is invited to a sleepover by Frida and Harriet who are trying to figure out what secret Joan is hiding, ultimately leading to the reveal that Frida and Harriet accidentally murdered someone as kids. Meanwhile, JFK is taught about social media and internet trolling by Confucius and has an internet argument with Topher.
| 16 | 3 | "Anxious Times at Clone High" | Jack Shih | Dannah Phirman & Danielle Schneider | June 1, 2023 |
Sampson and Scudworth enact Phase Two of Operation Spread Eagle with "Pre-Midterms," in an attempt to hypercharge the clones stress levels to see who will break first, culminating in the "Mandatory Broad Daylight Swimsuit Dance". JFK gets Joan a giant gold necklace, making her question if she'll be trapped forever in her new relationship. Abe also feels stress over seeing Joan and JFK getting serious, Harriet is stressed with the possibility she will grow up into a wine mom, and everyone is stressed by Sampson's latest hire: the Clone High mental health mascot, the Heebie-Jeebie. Guest star: Ian Ziering as himself
| 17 | 4 | "The Crown: Joancoming: It's a Cleo Cleo Cleo Cleo World" | Kristen Morrison | Judah Miller | June 1, 2023 |
When homecoming comes around and Joan becomes furious with Cleo's ego and spreads a rumor about Cleo's latte. To Cleo's shock, Joan is rewarded homecoming queen. Joan not wanting the role and feeling bad, gives the crown to Cleo, but when she gains the crown, Cleo becomes dangerously overpowered bending the clones to be her zombies.
| 18 | 5 | "Some Talking but Mostly Songs" | Mark Ackland | Matt Marshall | June 8, 2023 |
Learning of a chance to be hired on for the show Tropical Hospital, Harriet stages her play "Twister: The Game: The Musical", starring Joan and JFK, only to find Joan is a terrible actress. Sampson wants Scudworth to start showing more discipline over the students, fearing the musical will cause chaos to reign over the school. Soon Joan wants to make massive changes to the musical, leading to Harriet firing Joan from the play, and Scudworth to ban all performances from the school. Only a last minute staging of the musical at the Grassy Knoll can save the show. Guest star: Steve Kerr as himself
| 19 | 6 | "Saved by the Knoll" | Jack Shih | Jessica Lamour | June 8, 2023 |
After the musical ends up accidentally burning down the Grassy Knoll, it is revealed the diner is to be bulldozed to build a new condo, triggering Joan's long dormant nostalgia triggered illness, "Psylly Legs". Joan only trusts Abe with knowing about her condition, and the two launch a campaign to save and rebuild the Grassy Knoll (against the former owner's wishes). Meanwhile, JFK and Harriet are torn about their new found feelings after their kiss in the musical stirs feelings between the two. Guest stars: Stephen Root as Mr Big Corporation, Danny Pudi as Doctor Neelankavil, David Tennant as himself and Mandy Moore as herself
| 20 | 7 | "Spring Broken" | Kristen Morrison | Kyle Lau | June 15, 2023 |
After the clones find themselves stranded in the desert, JFK experiences a heat-induced intellectual breakthrough, Abe faces a zombie horde, and Scudworth and Mr. B hit the big time in Vegas.
| 21 | 8 | "Sexy Ed" | Jack Shih | Siena East | June 15, 2023 |
While Clone High mourns a power couple breakup, Candide and Scudworth hatch a plan to reunite the pair with sex education and sensual sax solos.
| 22 | 9 | "For Your Consideration" | Kristen Morrison | Erica Rivinoja, Dannah Phirman & Danielle Schneider | June 22, 2023 |
After a fight with Scudworth, Mr. B prepares to leave Clone High for good - but not before telling Joan his epic backstory. Guest stars: Sam Richardson as Wesley
| 23 | 10 | "Clone Alone" | Mark Ackland | Judah Miller & Mickey Jacobs | June 22, 2023 |
As Operation Spread Eagle ends, the students of Clone High are offered the opportunity to attend Clone High College. In the end Joan manages to restore the Clones' memories, but Candide retaliates against her by revealing she is the one who made them fall in the holes. While all of this wasn't really a life and death test, it doesn't change the fact that Joan tried to kill them. Guest stars: Michael Bolton as himself

=== Season 3 (2024) ===
| No. overall | No. in season | Title | Directed by | Written by | Original release date |
|---|---|---|---|---|---|
| 24 | 1 | "Blinded With Pseudoscience: Magnetic Distractions" | Jack Shih | Judah Miller | February 1, 2024 |
During a new year at Clone High, a new teacher begins teaching the students in a non-educational manner, much to the suspicion of Harriet. When Joan is snubbed due to her actions in the last season finale, she reluctantly finds a new clique in a group of troublemaking outcasts.
| 25 | 2 | "Don't You Get It? Sports Are Huge in This Town" | Kristen Morrison | Erica Rivinoja & Matthew Kerr | February 1, 2024 |
Scudworth encourages Frida to take up a hobby in competitive snorkeling, mostly to project his tragic past as a failed snorkeler. Joan plans to infiltrate the cheer squad and sabotage them in revenge for how she's been treated, but her conscience soon gets the best of her when Harriet begins second-guessing her bitterness towards Joan.
| 26 | 3 | "Bible Humpers: A Much Needed Praycation" | Mark Ackland | Siena East | February 1, 2024 |
To be free from paying taxes ever again, Scudworth begins converting Clone High into a religious school, a change that puts Abe and JFK's friendship to the test due to the latter showing a more celibate side and makes Harriet worry that Confucius will find out about her feelings for Toussaint Louverture due to having an "eye-affair" with him at the start of the season.
| 27 | 4 | "The Principal Principle: Sub Zero to Sub Hero" | Mark Ackland | Matt Marshall | February 1, 2024 |
After Scudworth assigns Joan and Abe to be the new Principal and Vice-Principal for the day, Joan seizes the opportunity to throw a get together to make everyone forgive her for her actions during the Death Maze. Scudworth and Mr. Butlertron plan to stock the school with burritos and try to hide this from Candide.
| 28 | 5 | "Money Can Buy Me Love: Stupid Is as Cupid Does" | Jack Shih | Dannah Phirman & Danielle Schneider | February 1, 2024 |
During a Valentines Day dance, Confucius and Joan hatch a scheme to get the former and Harriet back together when she begins dating Toussaint. Abe attempts to ask a new girl named Mary to join him at the dance. Scudworth's attempts to score a date himself results in him trying to help an old flame of his cure a destructive habit.
| 29 | 6 | "Go Yell It on the Mountain: Snow Way Out" | Kristen Morrison | Jessica Lamour | February 1, 2024 |
A field trip to a ski lodge ends up with everyone caught in an avalanche on account of various problems the group are facing and they must find a way out while avoiding a cabin fever-crazed Mr. Butlertron.
| 30 | 7 | "Grave Mistakes: The Virgin Homicides" | Mark Ackland | Kyle Lau | February 1, 2024 |
The group discovers that Mary is really Bloody Mary from Joan, Harriet and Frida's sleepover and try to stop Abe from having intercourse with her. Scudworth and Butlertron are tasked with making new clones of historical figures.
| 31 | 8 | "Cyranos: A Portmant-opus" | Jack Shih | Mickey Jacobs | February 1, 2024 |
During parent-teacher's night, Confucius convinces Abe and Joan to fill in as his foster parents, but Abe and Joan are at each other's throats with Scudworth scheming to extort Confucius' wealth from his alleged foster Mom and Dad. Frida plans to introduce Cleopatra to her foster dad since they're an item, but her insecurities about the whole ordeal cause her to ask Harriet for help. Guest star: Randall Park as Frida's foster dad
| 32 | 9 | "Cloney Island: Twist!" | Kristen Morrison | Marlena Rodriguez | February 1, 2024 |
The clones learn of Scudworth's plan to make them theme park attractions from his journal and also learn about how his plan came to be.
| 33 | 10 | "The Cloniest Place on Earth: Missile While You Work" | Mark Ackland | Judah Miller, Dannah Phirman & Danielle Schneider | February 1, 2024 |
Scudworth manages to bring the clones to his theme park island via submarine in order for his Cloney Island dream to become a reality, which Candide plots to end by sending a missile to destroy it and the Clones have to get everyone off the island before the missile arrives. Guest star: Richard Kind as Nostradamus

== Production ==
=== Development ===
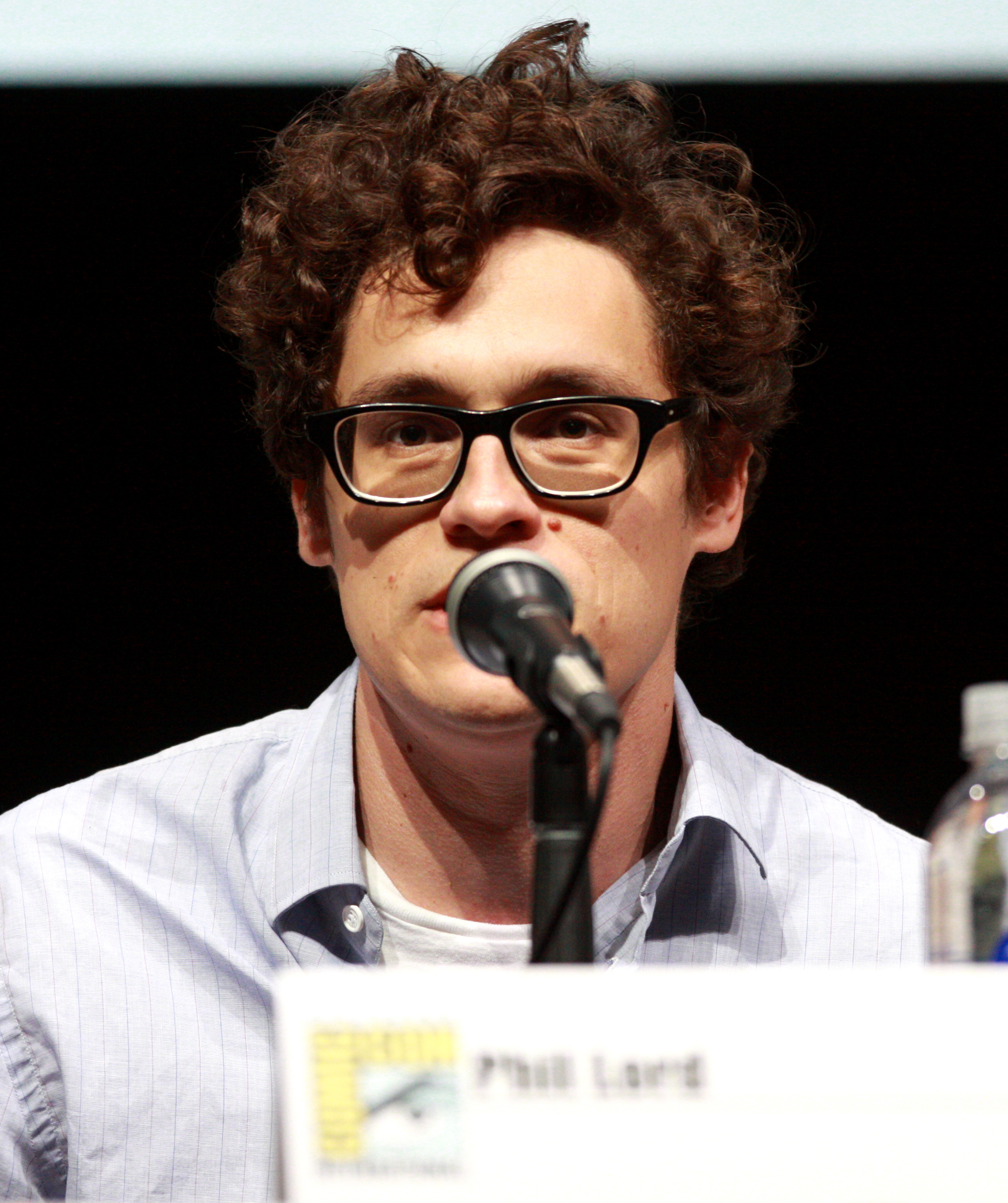
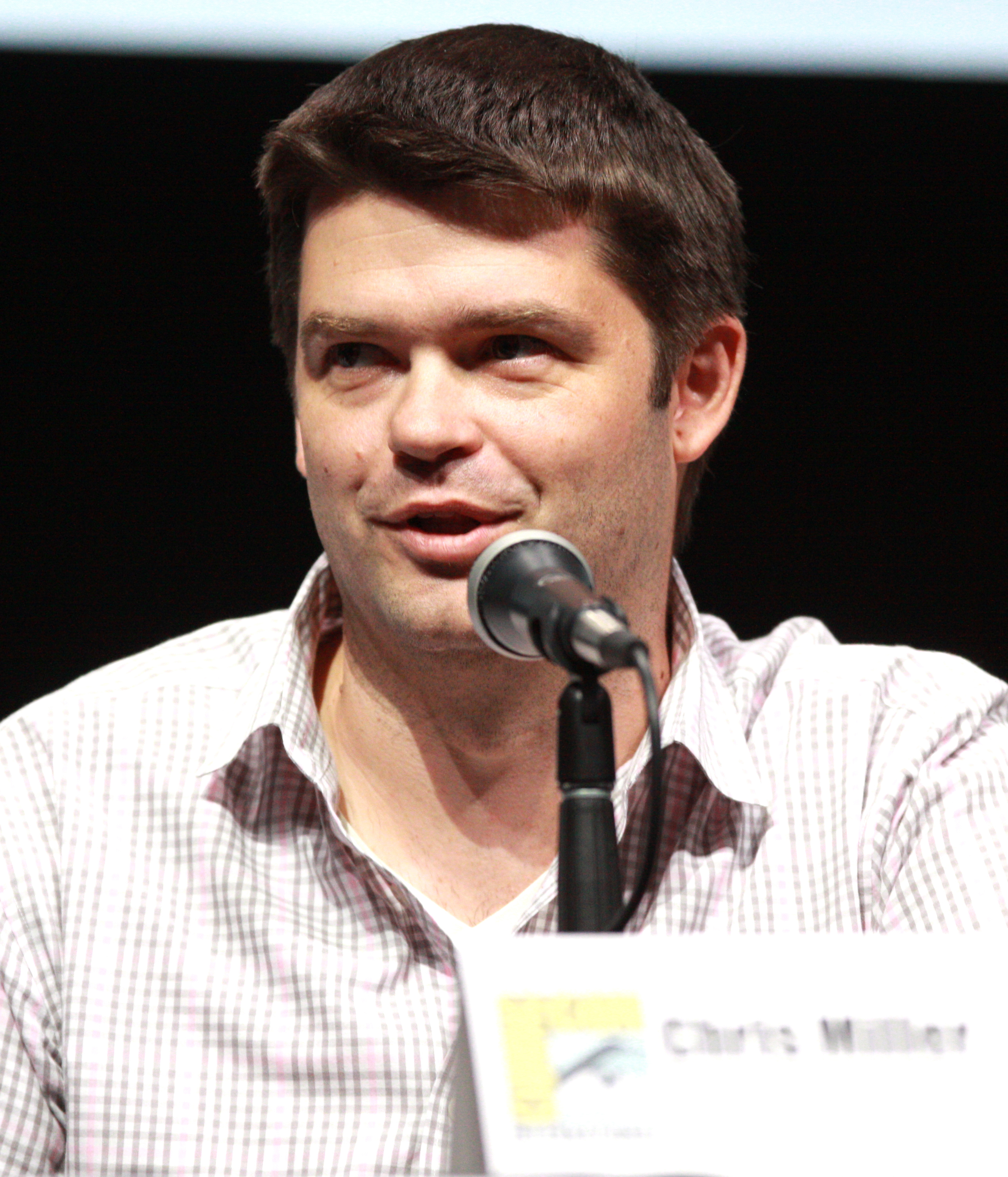
The show was created by Phil Lord and Christopher Miller, seen here at San Diego Comic-Con in 2013.

Phil Lord and Christopher Miller first met together while they were attending Dartmouth College. The profiles of Lord and Miller on the college's newspaper caught the attention to former Disney chairman Michael Eisner. Lord and Miller attended a two-minute interview with animation executives at Walt Disney Studios in Burbank, California. The next day, they signed a development deal at Walt Disney Television Animation to create Saturday-morning cartoons. They spent a year trying to create a Saturday morning show but felt that they were not "Disney brand" enough to pitch it. They were later hired by Touchstone Television to create primetime programming, writing a few episodes of Zoe, Duncan, Jack and Jane and Go Fish.

Clone High started development after they graduated in college and landed a deal at Walt Disney Television Animation. While attempting to develop a Saturday-morning cartoon, Miller developed the show's premise with the clones attending at a university on a notebook. Lord later changed the show's setting to a high school, attempting to lean into the tropes of teen dramas, a popular genre at the time. While making lists of people "everybody [had] heard of", they found themselves limited in the number of historical figures they could depict, in consideration with avoiding "litigious estates" (such as the families of Albert Einstein and Marilyn Monroe) and "keeping in mind" with the viewership of MTV. The show's depiction of Gandhi was based on people in high school and college Lord and Miller knew, who were of Indian descent that had a lot of boundaries and expectations by their families. His "party guy" persona was borrowed from their research, through which Lord and Miller found out that he was a party guy when he was young and in law enforcement school.

Clone High was initially pitched to the Fox Broadcasting Company, who purchased the show but decided not to order it to series due to a "regime change". Miller deemed it the "easiest pitch ever," considering the show's use of famous figures. Following Fox's rejection, MTV purchased the program in May 2001. Later, Lord and Miller met and pitched the idea to their godfather Bill Lawrence, who started working on the first season of Scrubs at the time. Having difficulty affording an office, Lawrence helped Lord and Miller locate their offices at an empty portion of North Hollywood Medical Center, where Scrubs was filmed. The show was at a low, limited budget, costing approximately $750,000 per episode. According to Miller during an interview with Entertainment Weekly in 2017, Clone High helped Lord and Miller learn about filmmaking, including editing and execution of timing.

=== Voice cast and recording ===
"There are shows that I've worked on where you're really trying to figure out how to do these voices and how to navigate the character and it's a bit of a trudge. This is not one of those shows. It's all on the page. These guys have figured out the stuff for you and so it's not hard at all to do this. And because it's so well-written, it gives you space to improvise because it's so well set up that you get room to sort of play, which I love to do."

— Nicole Sullivan during an interview with Animation World Network (2024)

Lord and Miller cast actors that had backgrounds on improv and comedy. Will Forte was cast as Abe Lincoln during production of the first season. His first voice-acting role, Forte was asked by Lord and Miller, who were friends with him, to voice Abe for the show. Forte had a positive feeling about the show, but felt nervous. When Forte first voiced the character, he thought that his voice performance for the role was boring, though he admitted that the emotions, the screams, and the singing of the character were "fun to do". In 2024, Forte recalled on Animation World Network that he was "terrified and overthinking it", thinking he was not good as the other voice actors in the show.

Nicole Sullivan, who was a friend of Christa Miller in her mid-20s, was convinced to visit the booth by Christopher and Christa Miller during a phone call. Sullivan had mixed thoughts due to her level of success in Mad TV, Kim Possible, Buzz Lightyear of Star Command, and The King of Queens. When Sullivan read the lines for Joan of Arc, Sullivan did not understand the show, feeling that the show was for a young audience. She recalled on Animation World Network that for the first five episodes of the first season, she did not "know what [she] was doing" with the character. By production of the second season, Sullivan felt more comfortable with the character, commenting that she was "just as easy to play". Phil Lord provided the voice of Cinnamon Scudworth. In The Gazette article from 2003, Lord described the experience of voicing the character as "fun", stating "It's just me screaming and pouting and being especially whiny." Lord also felt emotional when voicing the character. Allowing the voice actors to improvise while recording the lines, they occasionally make little additions in the lines, such as in the middle of a monologue.

The series also featured guest stars. Several of them were well-known celebrities, including Marilyn Manson, Michael J. Fox, Mandy Moore, Tom Green, Luke Perry, and Jack Black. Prior to the show's premiere, Marilyn Manson received the script to record his lines for the show.

=== Writing ===
The writing staff of the show were picked by the creators for their specific sense of humor. The team included Judah Miller, Tom Martin, Murray Miller, Eric Kentoff, and Erica Rivinoja. The writing staff of Scrubs were also involved in the writing process, giving them "jokes and thoughts". Several plotlines were based on Lord and Miller's experiences. During an interview with Entertainment Weekly in 2017, Bill Lawrence stated that the writers would sometimes "stay in the psych ward [in North Hollywood Medical Center]" and make the creators laugh, which was cited as one of the reasons why many cast members of Scrubs appeared in the show.

=== Animation and design ===
The art design was characterized by a flat appearance with a limited animation technique known as "pose-to-pose" animation, which was used as an influence to Samurai Jack. According to Jack Coleman of Collider, the characters were bordered with thick outlines and usually made up of "strange evocative shapes" and "hard angles", a style similar to old UPA animated shows and other animated series at the time. The characters have little movements when they speak, and several assets of the animation were reused. The animation generally had a quick pace for comic timing, but the scenes with more emotional content had slower and more fluid movements. According to Lord, they never wanted the viewers to pay attention to the animation, but it was there to serve the show's sense of humor and its stories. Gandhi is the most animated character on the show; he requires twice as many storyboard poses as any other character. The characters and backgrounds were traditionally drawn, and frames and cels were frequently recycled.

Lord and Miller drew several concept drawings of JFK and Joan of Arc during development. Total Drama character designer Todd Kauffman did designs for the show's intro. Kauffman later used Clone High as an influence to design the Total Drama characters as requested by the producers. The first season was animated by Rough Draft Studios. The second and third seasons were animated by Jam Filled Entertainment.

=== Music ===
Clone High featured a wide variety of music, usually exclusive to alternative rock, indie rock, Midwest emo, hardcore punk, pop rock, metalcore, from mostly unknown and underground bands and musicians. The soundtrack included songs by Alkaline Trio, American Football, Ritalin, Catch 22, Ilya, The Gentleman, Drex, Taking Back Sunday, The Gloria Record, The Stereo, Jo Davidson, Saves the Day, Hot Rod Circuit, Thursday, Helicopter Helicopter, Owen, Dashboard Confessional, Elf Power, Abandoned Pools, The Get Up Kids, Mink Lungs, Mates of State, Snapcase, The Mooney Suzuki, Jon DeRosa, Ephemera, Jinnrall, Avoid One Thing, DJ Cellulitis, DJ Piccolo, Whippersnapper, Matt Pond PA, Mad City and Bumblefoot. The series' other background music and original score was written and produced by Scott Nickoley and Jamie Dunlap of Mad City Productions.

== Humor ==
Clone High uses two main sources of comedy: teen drama parodies and historical references. Clone High experimented with long storylines with romances and running gags, constructed with adult jokes, conspiracy theories, and melodrama. Each episode is introduced as a "very special episode", the show uses satire to appeal to MTV's male targeted demographic, aged 17 to 25. The show parodied dramas that appeared on U.S. television in the 1990s that dealt with themes such as drug abuse, AIDS, alternative lifestyles, racism, ostracism, and consequences of prom. The show also parodied aspects of teenagers on television, centering on school narratives, including presidential elections, standardized testing, makeovers, school musicals, celebrities, the prom, school athletics, and fundraisers. A lot of the show's humor were references cited from common knowledge of the historical figures, including JFK yelling "Nothing bad ever happens to the Kennedys!" before crashing his car in the fifth episode of the first season.

Several aspects of the show parodied teen dramas. Part of the humor for this trope was that it mocked the misery of high school, tackling the issues with wit and absurdity. Themes of Dawson's Creek were used to parody the themes of homosexuality, eating disorders, sex, diseases, and morality. Plots, themes, and scenes of teen series and films were referenced: The love triangle of Abe, Joan, and Cleo parodied Dawson's Creek, the "parents-are-away" parties paid homage to Freaks and Geeks, the makeover plotline was reminiscent of teen films at the time (including Clueless), and a teen-suicide hotline subplot referenced Heathers. The idea of the characters having to live up to their expectations, an aspect common in teen dramas, was also used to style the show's humor. While Clone High includes a sexually and diverse society, other themes satirize American racial and gendered norms, including the transformation of Gandhi from a geek into "a shorter, browner Kennedy" in the twelfth episode of the first season.

== Release ==
Clone High was originally slated to premiere at the same time in Canada and the United States. The first episode debuted on November 2, 2002, on the Canadian cable network Teletoon. Reruns of the series were formerly aired on Teletoon's now-defunct Teletoon at Night (formerly known as "Teletoon Detour") block. Also, it briefly aired on MTV Canada, Razer (now MTV2), and Much and currently airs on Adult Swim in Canada. In the United States, the series premiered on January 20, 2003, on MTV. Clone High was a commercial failure, and it suffered low ratings during the run. After MTV publicists finished an apology to India on the show's depiction of Gandhi on its press, Lord and Miller were forced to cancel the show. The remaining episodes can be viewed on unauthorized websites in the United States. In 2016, the entire first season aired in the United States for the first time on MTV Classic.

=== Initial reviews ===
Upon the first season's premiere, Clone High initially received mixed reviews from television critics. On Metacritic, the show has a score of 60 out of 100 based on seven reviews from critics, indicating "mixed or average reviews". Several critics likened the "enjoyably nervy" humor to that of Curb Your Enthusiasm. In a positive review, Dakota Loomis of Flak Magazine stated that "Clone High is original, quirky and worthwhile television, head and shoulders above the endlessly replicating reality show rabble." David Bianculli of the New York Daily News gave the series three stars, praising the vocal talents as "entertaining" and listed the show's depictions of Joan of Arc and Cleopatra as the show's best central characters. He concluded, "Clone High is the highest of high concepts, a weird idea even for a season that brings us Joe Millionaire." Pittsburgh Post-Gazette's Rob Owen complimented the show: "Yes, Clone High has the MTV-requisite sexual innuendo, but it's more clever than much of what passes for humor in prime time today. And like Scrubs, it has heart, particularly when it comes to Abe and Joan."

Anita Gates of The New York Times opined that "the dialogue isn't always exactly funny, but it's smile worthy," observing, "the characters are intriguing in a lightweight way but could lose their appeal fast." Scott Sandell of the Los Angeles Times felt that the show's debut episode "doesn't quite live up to the obvious comedic potential behind the killer premise." The Hollywood Reporter's Michael Farkash felt similarly, writing, "The premise sounds intriguing, but what hatches in the first episode is a disappointing, weak strain of comic material, lacking the cunning, subversive quality of, say, South Park."

=== Home video and streaming ===
On January 24, 2005, Nelvana announced on Corus Entertainment's website that Clone High, along with several others, would be released on home video with the retail initiative Teletoon Presents. The series was released as "The Complete First Season" in Canada by Kaboom! Entertainment and Nelvana. The DVD contains every episode from the original first season, including the five episodes which did not originally air in the United States. As of 2023, the series is available to be streamed on Paramount+ in the United States. On April 14, 2023, the first season was added to Max, ahead of the revival's premiere. The revival, alongside the first season of the original show, was added to Hulu in October 2024.

Clone High: The Complete First Season
| Set details | Special features | |
| 13 episodes; 2-disc DVD set; 286 minutes; Dolby Digital: English; French | Video clips of: Christopher Miller performing as "Mr. B"; Phil Lord performing as "Principal Scudworth"; Bill Lawrence, an executive producer, in a hot tub; Tom Martin describing the writing process; Video footage of live-action cat depicted in "Raisin the Stakes: A Rock Opera in 3 Acts" | |
DVD release dates
| Region 1 | Region 2 | Region 4 |
| September 20, 2005 | June 20, 2005 | Unknown (separate, currently out of print) |

== Gandhi controversy ==
The show's depiction of Gandhi as a party animal received negative backlash from India.

In early 2003, an article in Maxim magazine depicting Mahatma Gandhi being beaten up by a muscular man sparked outrage in India. Clone High was caught in the crossfire when citizens in the country conducted internet searches on the Maxim article but also found out about the show's Gandhi character on MTV's website. This sparked an outrage in India over the show's depiction of Gandhi. On January 30, 2003, the 55th anniversary of Mahatma Gandhi's assassination, approximately 150 protesters (including members of parliament) gathered in New Delhi and vowed to fast in response to Clone High, including Gandhi's great-grandson Tushar Gandhi. Tom Freston, the head of Viacom (owner of MTV), was visiting the network's India branch and was "trapped in the building". In 2014, he recalled that protestors "basically threatened that they'd revoke MTV's broadcasting license in India if they didn't take the show off the air".

MTV offered a quick apology, stating that "Clone High was created and intended for an American audience", and "we recognize and respect that various cultures may view this programming differently, and we regret any offense taken by the content in the show". Miller would later recall that executives at MTV enjoyed the show, and asked for the duo to pitch a second season without Gandhi. Lord and Miller's two potential versions of a second season included one that made no mention of Gandhi's absence, and another that revealed that the character was a clone of actor Gary Coleman. "We pitched that, and it went up to the top at Viacom again and it got a big no," he remembered. This idea has since been scrapped as Gandhi did not return in the revival.

== Cult following and legacy ==
=== Retrospective reviews ===
The first season of Clone High garnered wide reappraisal and praise from television critics. Heather Marulli of Television Without Pity called the series "a mini-masterpiece of the animated genre; an opus to the primetime cartoon". David Broermann of the website Freakin' Awesome Network gave the series an "A+", saying it has "some really really good character development and depth" and an "amazing soundtrack". He notes the fantastic use of multiple running gags keeping viewers on their toes. In 2009, the show was listed as number five on IGN's "Reader Choice: Top Animated Series". In a 2014 retrospective piece on the series, Jesse David Fox of Vulture praised the premise, characters, and voice-acting, writing that "Clone High still holds up more than a decade later as a brilliantly funny, completely nuts, surprisingly heartfelt, tonally inventive masterpiece."

=== Popularity ===
After its initial cancelation in 2003, Clone High fell into obscurity in the United States. However, it survived on the internet and gained a fanbase throughout the years. A clip of Gandhi and George Washington Carver going "Say what?" inspired parody and remix videos on YouTube. After the show was announced to have a revival in 2020, the first season of the show gained popularity, with several memes posted on Instagram. Clone High also gained popularity on TikTok, which drew new audiences to the show. In late August 2020, a tweet that included a clip of JFK went viral on Twitter, spreading memes of JFK by September. Several memes included audio clips of JFK and videos of fans cosplaying as JFK on TikTok. Several fans also cosplayed other characters, such as Joan of Arc, for TikTok.

== Revival ==
Lord and Miller have stated that they have "considered" a live-action film adaptation of the series. In 2014, they explained that as they at that time were under contract with Fox, Lawrence had a television deal at Warner Bros. Television and the rights to Clone High were owned by MTV/Viacom, it would be difficult to resurrect the show. References to Clone High are present in their later productions: the duo admitted many jokes in 22 Jump Street were "ripped off straight from Clone High", while Forte also voices a Lego version of Lincoln in The Lego Movie (2014), and the original version of Lincoln in America: The Motion Picture (2021). In a Grantland article from 2014, the two joked that "our entire career has just been about getting Clone High back on the air". In the 2018 film Spider-Man: Into the Spider-Verse, produced by Lord and Miller, a billboard, designed in parody to the original poster for 22 Jump Street, appears promoting a movie titled Clone College, starring Abe and JFK.

In March 2020, Lord and Miller brought the first pitch of the revival to HBO Max on Zoom, along with others. On July 2, 2020, it was announced that a revival of the series was in development at MTV Entertainment Studios, with creators Phil Lord, Christopher Miller and Bill Lawrence returning; it was also revealed that original series writer Erica Rivinoja would serve as showrunner of the series, while also co-writing the pilot with Lord and Miller. On February 10, 2021, the series was ordered for two seasons by HBO Max. On June 23, 2021, Christopher Miller revealed the title of the revival's first episode as "Let's Try This Again". On September 16, 2021, Tara Billinger, who is known for Paul Rudish's Mickey Mouse universe and created Long Gone Gulch, announced that she would be serving as art director. On October 29, 2022, Miller announced via Twitter, that the revival would premiere in the first half of 2023. On November 2, 2022, Lord, Miller, and Billinger posted teasers of the show on their Twitter pages. On January 28, 2023, the unfinished first episode of the revival was leaked.

On March 24, 2023, it was announced that a majority of the original cast would be returning, but the role of Cleopatra, who was originally voiced by Christa Miller, will now be voiced by Mitra Jouhari, while Christa Miller will now be playing Candide Simpson. Lord and Miller revealed that the character of Gandhi will not be returning in the first two seasons of the revival due to the controversy the original series faced over his portrayal, with the former stating that he may return in a potential fourth season. Joining the cast were Ayo Edebiri as Harriet Tubman (replacing Debra Wilson), Vicci Martinez as Frida Kahlo, Kelvin Yu as Confucius, Neil Casey as Topher Bus, Jana Schmieding as Sacagawea, Sam Richardson as Wesley, Mo Gaffney as Ms. Grumbles, Al Madrigal as Frederico, Danny Pudi as Dr. Neelankavil, Emily Maya Mills as Ethel Merman, and Michael Bolton, Ian Ziering, Steve Kerr, and a returning Mandy Moore as fictionalized versions of themselves. On April 5, 2023, an official teaser trailer was uploaded on the official channel for HBO Max. The final trailer was later released on May 8, 2023. The revival premiered on May 23, 2023.

In January 2024, the second season of the revival (third season overall) announced several new cast members joining the series. Consisting of Jermaine Fowler as Toussaint Louverture, Paul F. Tompkins as Professor Hirsute, Stephen Root as Schneider Snorkelle, Jackée Harry as a fictionalized version of herself based on Jack the Ripper, Hannah Simone as Lady Godiva, D'Arcy Carden as Bloody Mary, Randall Park as Mr. Kim, Jameela Jamil as Mrs. C, Renee Elise Goldsberry as Sandra Sandria and Richard Kind as Nostradamus (replacing Andy Dick). The trailer was uploaded the following week, confirming the entirety of the season airing on February 1. On July 26, 2024, it was announced that the revival would not be returning for a third season (fourth season overall), once again ending the series on a cliffhanger.

== See also ==
=== Fictional works with a similar premise ===
- "The Savage Curtain" (Star Trek episode)
- Riverworld
- Bill and Ted's Excellent Adventure
- Night at the Museum series
- Afterschool Charisma

=== Related overall themes ===
- Cultural depictions of Abraham Lincoln
- Cultural depictions of Joan of Arc
- Cultural depictions of John F. Kennedy
- Cultural depictions of Cleopatra
- List of artistic depictions of Mahatma Gandhi
- Dolly the sheep
