= Nicole Sullivan =

American actress and comedian (born 1970)

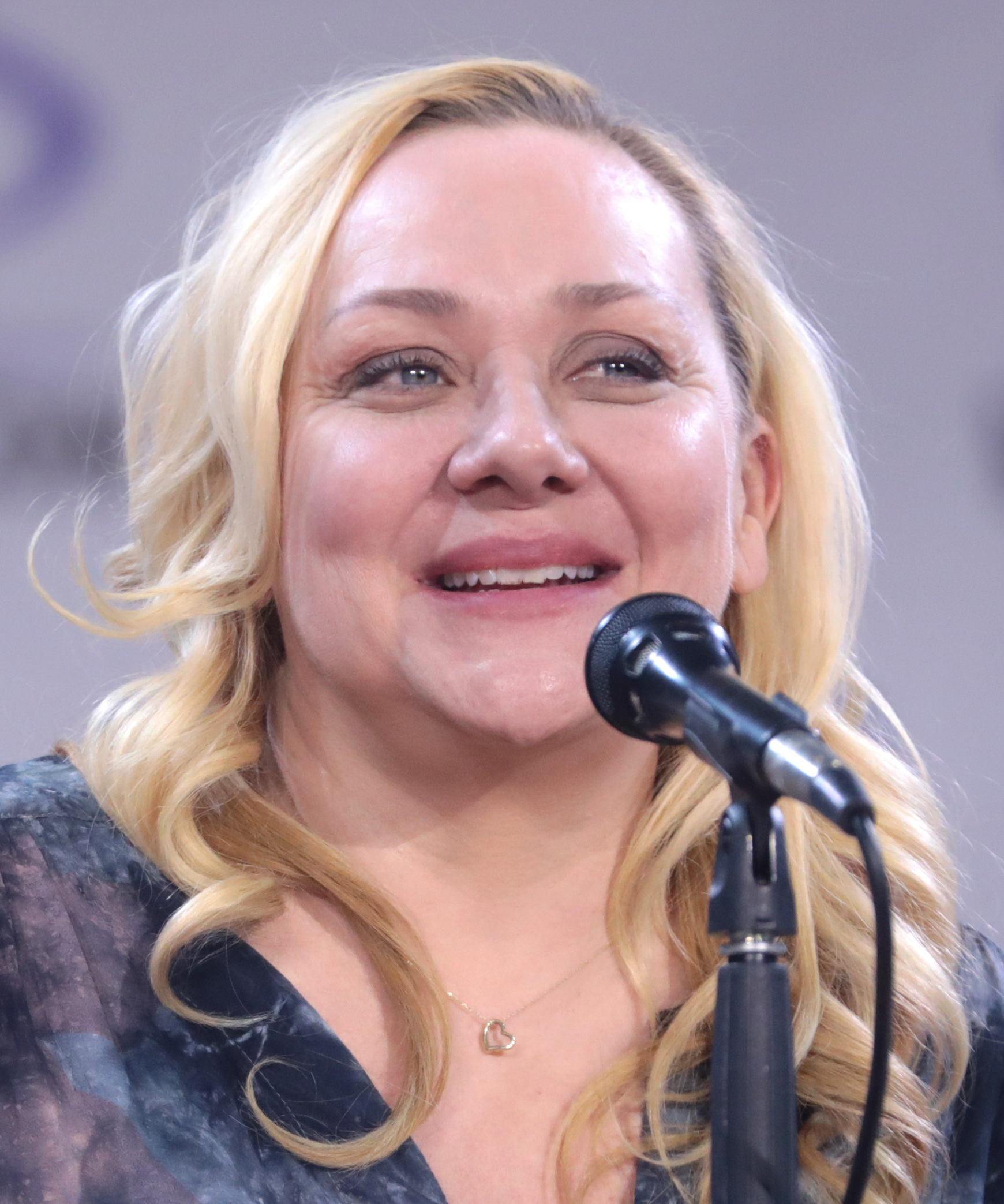
- Sullivan in 2023
- Born: April 21, 1970 (age 56); New York City, U.S.
- Occupations: Actress; comedian
- Years active: 1990–present
- Spouse: Jason Packham (m. 2006)
- Children: 2

Nicole Sullivan (born April 21, 1970) is an American actress and comedian known for being a cast member on the sketch comedy series MADtv for six seasons (1995–2001). She also played Holly Shumpert in five seasons (2001–2005, 2007) of the CBS sitcom The King of Queens.

Sullivan played the recurring character of Jill Tracy on Scrubs. She voiced heroic Mira Nova in the Disney/Pixar series Buzz Lightyear of Star Command and the villainous Shego in the Disney Channel series Kim Possible. She had recurring voice roles on Family Guy and voiced Franny Robinson in Disney's 2007 film Meet the Robinsons. From 2008 to 2009, she starred in and was the lead of her own Lifetime television series Rita Rocks. From 2008 to 2013, she voiced Marlene the Otter in The Penguins of Madagascar. She played Jules' (Courteney Cox) therapist, Lynn Mettler, on the comedy Cougar Town. She portrayed Lyla in the Disney Channel film Let It Shine in 2012. In 2013, she starred in the short-lived Nickelodeon sitcom Wendell & Vinnie as Wilma Basset. From 2014 to 2022, she portrayed Janine, the Johnsons' next-door neighbor, on the ABC sitcom Black-ish. She also voices Kara Danvers aka Supergirl in DC Super Hero Girls.

== Early life ==
Sullivan was born in Manhattan on April 21, 1970. She took dance classes at age 7 and performed in Off Broadway and Broadway productions with the First All-Children's Theatre. Sullivan's mother Madonna (née Rauscher) Sullivan, a businesswoman, and her father Edward C. Sullivan, who represented Manhattan's 69th district in the New York State Assembly from 1977 to 2002, moved the family upstate to Middleburgh, New York, in 1982. She graduated from Middleburgh in 1987.

== Career ==
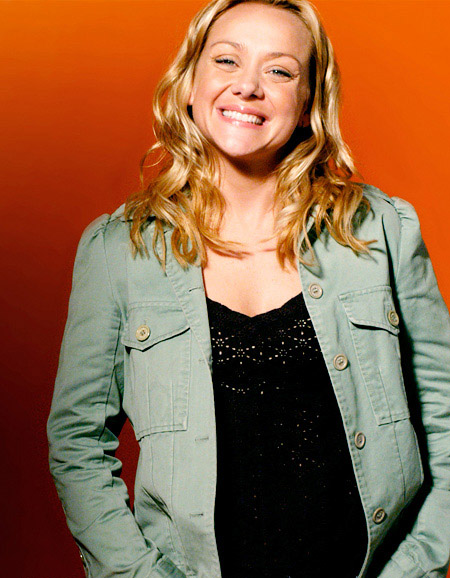
Sullivan in 2003

=== MADtv ===
Sullivan was among the original cast members on Fox's MADtv when it premiered in 1995. She created numerous characters; her most popular was the mean-spirited Vancome Lady. Sullivan's other characters included X-News reporter Amy, dimwitted Antonia, Eracists leader Debbie, News at 6's Diane Lawyer-Trabajo (pronounced "trebalyo"), racist country singer Darlene McBride, and Latina bimbo Lida. Sullivan appeared with Michael McDonald in a MADtv sketch about making an audition tape to appear on Law & Order that mocked their acting prowess; she later guest-starred in the Law & Order: Special Victims Unit season one episode "Contact". Sullivan was featured in the November/December 2009 issue of Making Music Magazine.

=== The King of Queens ===
Sullivan played the role of Holly Shumpert from 2001 to 2005. She returned in 2007 to reprise the role for the final season. In most of the show, Holly's profession is a dog walker. The Heffernans hire her to 'walk' Arthur, Carrie's father, to get him some exercise and keep him out of mischief.

=== Voice acting projects ===
Sullivan was originally cast as Turanga Leela, one of the main characters of the animated series Futurama, but the role was recast with Katey Sagal before the show began production.

Sullivan has voiced Marlene the Otter on The Penguins of Madagascar – the first television series of the Madagascar franchise – which aired on Nickelodeon, Shego on Kim Possible; Joan of Arc on Clone High; Mira Nova on Buzz Lightyear of Star Command; and Joan on the Family Guy episode, "I Take Thee Quagmire", along with several other one time voices on the show. Sullivan has also starred in a pilot called Me and My Needs that was rejected by ABC. She played Franny Robinson in Meet the Robinsons. Also, Sullivan was a voice actor in the Monsters, Inc. video game. She played Luna in the 2007 video game Ratchet & Clank: Size Matters. In 2012, she also provided the voice of Supergirl in Super Best Friends Forever, a series of animated shorts which aired on Cartoon Network's DC Nation block. with the role carrying on to television series DC Super Hero Girls, which led to appearances on Teen Titans Go! and a direct-to-video crossover film Teen Titans Go! & DC Super Hero Girls: Mayhem in the Multiverse, which was released on May 24, 2022.

== Personal life ==
Sullivan is married to actor Jason Packham. They have two sons, born May 2007 and August 2009.

Sullivan won the first edition of Celebrity Poker Showdown, donating $100,000 to the charity Alley Cat Allies.

Sullivan also made an appearance in an episode of It's Me or the Dog along with her husband, their then twenty-month-old son Dashel (Dash), their three cats, and their four mixed-breed dogs: Paco (a Chihuahua mix), Jackson (a Lab mix), Donut (a Great Pyrenees mix), and Funzies (a Catahoula Leopard mix).

In November 2021, Sullivan listed her home in Hollywood Hills for 1.45 million dollars.

== Filmography ==
=== Film ===
| Year | Title | Role | Notes |
|---|---|---|---|
| 2000 | Bar Hopping | Mara | |
| 2000 | Buzz Lightyear of Star Command: The Adventure Begins | Mira Nova | Voice, direct-to-video |
| 2002 | The Third Wheel | Sally | Uncredited |
| 2005 | Guess Who | Liz Klein | |
| 2005 | Sesame Street's All-Star Alphabet | Letter A | Direct-to-video |
| 2006 | The Ant Bully | Ant #9 | Voice |
| 2007 | Meet the Robinsons | Franny | Voice |
| 2008 | Superhero Movie | Julia Riker | |
| 2009 | Black Dynamite | Patricia Nixon | |
| 2009 | 17 Again | Naomi | |
| 2014 | Eat with Me | Maureen | |
| 2016 | Pee-wee's Big Holiday | Shelly | Netflix original film |
| 2018 | I'll Be Next Door for Christmas | Ms. James | |
| 2022 | Teen Titans Go! & DC Super Hero Girls: Mayhem in the Multiverse | Supergirl | Voice, direct-to-video |
| 2026 | Stop! That! Train! | Bickering Wife | |

=== Television ===
| Year | Title | Role | Notes |
|---|---|---|---|
| 1991 | Herman's Head | Young Woman | Episode: "The Last Boy Scout" |
| 1994 | Party of Five | Terry | Episode: "Private Lives" |
| 1994 | Diagnosis: Murder | Nurse #1 | Episode: "Murder Most Vial" |
| 1994 | Models Inc. | Elaine | Episode: "Of Models and Men" |
| 1995–2005, 2016 | MADtv | Various | 142 episodes |
| 1997 | The Drew Carey Show | Diane Pulaski | Episode: "Drew Gets Married" |
| 1997–1998 | Fired Up | Debbie | 2 episodes |
| 1999 | Pepper Ann | Tundra Woman | Voice, episode: "Dances with Ignorance/Girl Power" |
| 1999 | Suddenly Susan | Claire Teevens | Episode: "The Cheerleaders" |
| 2000 | Daddio | Miss Lang | Episode: "Of Mice and Math" |
| 2000 | Talk to Me | Kat Munroe | 3 episodes |
| 2000 | Law & Order: Special Victims Unit | Jen Caulder | Episode: "Contact" |
| 2000 | Titus | Carol | Episode: "Tommy's Girlfriend" |
| 2000–2001 | Buzz Lightyear of Star Command | Mira Nova, additional voices | Voice, 60 episodes |
| 2000–2002 | Baby Blues | Bizzy | Voice, 13 episodes |
| 2000–2022 | Family Guy | Muriel Goldman, various characters | Voice, 34 episodes |
| 2001 | According to Jim | Alicia | Episode: "Andy's Girlfriend" |
| 2001–2007 | The King of Queens | Holly Shumpert | 50 episodes |
| 2001–2009 | Scrubs | Jill Tracy | 6 episodes |
| 2002 | Teamo Supremo | Fabrica | Voice, episode: "Attack of the Stuffed Stuff" |
| 2002–2007 | Kim Possible | Shego, Miss Go; additional voices | Voice, 45 episodes |
| 2002, 2023–2024 | Clone High | Joan of Arc, Marie Curie | Voice, 23 episodes |
| 2003 | Less than Perfect | Deirdre Bishop | 2 episodes |
| 2003 | Rugrats | Debbie / Customer | Voice, episode: "Baby Sale/Steve" |
| 2003 | Miss Match | Rachel | Episode: "Addicted to Love" |
| 2003 | Stanley | Farmer Julie | Voice, episode: "Doing Like Ducks/Speedy Does It" |
| 2004 | Crank Yankers | Esperanza Thomas | Voice, 1 episode |
| 2005 | Monk | Janet Novak | Episode: "Mr. Monk and the Kid" |
| 2005 | Kim Possible Movie: So the Drama | Shego | Voice, television film |
| 2005 | Lilo & Stitch: The Series | Shego | Voice, episode: "Rufus" |
| 2005 | Hot Properties | Chloe Reid | 13 episodes |
| 2006 | Boston Legal | Joan Rubin | Episode: "...There's Fire!" |
| 2006 | Brandy & Mr. Whiskers | Gerri | Voice, 2 episodes |
| 2007 | Raines | Carolyn Crumley | |
| 2007 | My Boys | Kimmie | 2 episodes |
| 2007–2009 | Slacker Cats | Louise | Voice, 11 episodes |
| 2008 | Head Case | Herself | 2 episodes |
| 2008 | CSI: Crime Scene Investigation | Nancy Twicker | Episode: "Bull" |
| 2008 | The Suite Life of Zack & Cody | Miss Klotz | Episode: "Let Us Entertain You" |
| 2008–2009 | Rita Rocks | Rita Clemens | 40 episodes |
| 2008–2010 | The Secret Saturdays | Drew Saturday | Voice, 25 episodes |
| 2009 | Leverage | Heather Moscone | Episode: "The Wedding Job" |
| 2009 | It's Me or the Dog | Herself | Episode: "Hollywood Hounds" |
| 2009 | True Jackson, VP | Kreuftlva | Episode: "True Parade" |
| 2009–2015 | The Penguins of Madagascar | Marlene | Voice, 59 episodes |
| 2010 | Numb3rs | Nancy Hackett | Episode: "Scratch" |
| 2010 | The Doctors | Herself | Guest |
| 2010 | Firebreather | Dr. Pytel | Voice, television film |
| 2010–2011 | $#*! My Dad Says | Bonnie | 18 episodes |
| 2012 | RuPaul's Drag Race | Herself | Guest judge for "Queens Behind Bars" |
| 2012 | The Game | Sadie | Episode: "Let Them Eat (Cup)cake!" |
| 2012 | Super Best Friends Forever | Supergirl | Voice, TV short |
| 2012 | Let It Shine | Lyla | Disney Channel Original Movie |
| 2012–2013 | Cougar Town | Lynn Mettler | 7 episodes |
| 2013 | The Exes | Melanie | Episode: "My Ex-Boyfriend's Wedding" |
| 2013 | Wendell and Vinnie | Wilma Baset | 20 episodes |
| 2014 | The Middle | Vicki | Episode: "The Walk" |
| 2014 | TripTank | Sarah, Caitlin | Voice, 3 episodes |
| 2014 | Devious Maids | Molly | Episode: "The Visit" |
| 2014 | See Dad Run | Brooke | Episode: "See Dad Live at Five" |
| 2014–2019 | BoJack Horseman | Tracy, Fan Girl, Partygoer | Voice, 3 episodes |
| 2014–2022 | Black-ish | Janine | 23 episodes |
| 2015 | Grey's Anatomy | J.J. | Episode: "She's Leaving Home" |
| 2015 | Bones | Joanne DeMarco | Episode: "The Big Beef at the Royal Diner" |
| 2016 | Mutt & Stuff | Jenny Jasper | Episode: "Goat in 60 Seconds!" |
| 2016 | The Thundermans | Doggin | Episode: "Dog Day After-School" |
| 2016 | Worst Cooks in America Celebrity Edition | Herself | Contestant |
| 2017, 2019 | Mom | Leanne | 2 episodes |
| 2017 | Girlboss | Teresa | 2 episodes |
| 2017 | The Mindy Project | Dr. Witzel | Episode: "A Romantical Decouplement" |
| 2017–2018 | Disjointed | Maria Sherman | 16 episodes |
| 2018 | Corporate | Linda Lee | Episode: "Remember Day" |
| 2018 | Liverspots and Astronots | Big Man, Debra | Voice, 21 episodes |
| 2018 | Alone Together | Becky | Episode: "Dog Awards" |
| 2018 | The Boss Baby: Back in Business | Inside Mom | Voice, episode: "Par Avion" |
| 2018–2021 | Big Hero 6: The Series | Stern Woman, Hangry Panda | Voice, 6 episodes |
| 2019 | Middle School Moguls | Mogul Stern | Voice, 2 episodes |
| 2019 | 9-1-1 | Deborah | Episode: "Monsters" |
| 2019 | Harley Quinn | Mrs. Copplepot, Benjamin | Voice, episode: "A High Bar" |
| 2019–2020 | Team Kaylie | Principal Dana | 8 episodes |
| 2019–2022 | DC Super Hero Girls | Kara Danvers / Supergirl / Power Girl, Bizarro, Beatrice Zeul, various voices | Voice, main role |
| 2019–2022 | High School Musical: The Musical: The Series | Carol | 3 episodes |
| 2020 | Will & Grace | Ruth | Episode: "Filthy Phil, Part 1" |
| 2020–2021 | Bob Hearts Abishola | Lorraine | 3 episodes |
| 2020–2021 | Teen Titans Go! | Kara Danvers / Supergirl | Voice, 5 episodes |
| 2021 | All Rise | Bea Greer | Episode: "Bette Davis Eyes" |
| 2021 | Good Girls | Teacher | Episode: "One Night in Bangkok" |
| 2021 | HouseBroken | Little Cookie, others | Voice 5 episodes |
| 2021 | The Neighborhood | Alexis | Episode: "Welcome to the Sister from Another Mister" |
| 2021–2024 | The Sex Lives of College Girls | Carol Finkle | 6 episodes |
| 2022 | Murderville | Rebecca Hendricks | Episode: "The Cold Case" |
| 2023 | Last Week Tonight | Pam | Episode: "Homeowner Associations (HOAs)" |
| 2023 | Raven's Home | Miss Liza | Episode: “Lizard Let Lie" |
| 2023 | American Born Chinese | Robin | Episode: "Beyond Repair" |
| 2024 | That Girl Lay Lay | Ms. Nay Nay | Episode: "Out the App 2: E-Lay-Lay-tric Boogaloo" |
| 2025 | Running Point | Bonnie Bugg | Episode: "A Special Place in Hell" |
| 2025 | Vampirina: Teenage Vampire | Dr. Lugosi | Episode: "First Heartbeat" |
| 2026 | Chicago Med | Gail Spinner | Episode: "The Cost of Living" |
| 2026 | Chibiverse | Shego | Voice, episode: "Return of Pebble" |

=== Video games ===
| Year | Title | Voice role |
|---|---|---|
| 2000 | Buzz Lightyear of Star Command | Mira Nova |
| 2002 | Kim Possible: Revenge of Monkey Fist | Shego |
| 2006 | Kim Possible: What's the Switch? | Shego |
| 2007 | Ratchet & Clank: Size Matters | Luna |
| 2007 | Meet the Robinsons | Franny |
| 2009 | FusionFall | Drew Saturday |
| 2009 | The Secret Saturdays: Beasts of the 5th Sun | Drew Saturday |
| 2011 | Penguins of Madagascar: Dr. Blowhole Returns – Again | Marlene |
| 2021 | DC Super Hero Girls: Teen Power | Supergirl / Kara Danvers |
