= Mitra Jouhari =

Iranian-American comedian, actress, and writer (born 1993)

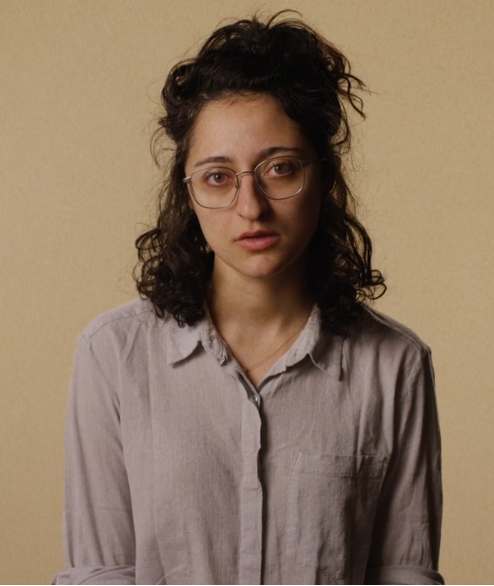
- Jouhari in 2018.
- Born: January 18, 1993 (age 33)
- Education: Ohio State University
- Occupations: Writer; comedian; actress
- Years active: 2015–present
- Notable work: Three Busy Debras; Clone High

Mitra Jouhari (born January 18, 1993) is an Iranian-American comedian, actress, and writer. She is best known for starring in the television series Three Busy Debras, based on the sketch comedy group she co-founded, and voicing Cleopatra "Cleo" Smith in the second and third seasons of Clone High. Jouhari has written for the television series Big Mouth, High Maintenance, and Miracle Workers.

== Early life and education ==
Jouhari was raised in West Chester, Ohio and is Iranian-American. She was a fan of comedy from childhood and considers the television shows The Daily Show and M*A*S*H pivotal to developing her interest.

She attended Lakota West High School, graduating in 2011. Jouhari attended college at Ohio State University and began to perform improv comedy as a member of 8th Floor Improv, as well as writing for the Sundial Humor Magazine. After taking internships at the TV shows The Daily Show and Late Night, she moved to New York City without graduating to pursue a career in comedy.

== Career ==
She contributes writing to the website The Reductress, and has written for the television series High Maintenance, Miracle Workers, and Big Mouth. Jouhari's writing for The President Show was nominated for a 2017 Writers Guild of America award.

In 2015, Jouhari co-founded the sketch comedy trio Three Busy Debras alongside Sandy Honig and Alyssa Stonoha. They performed weekly at The Annoyance in Brooklyn, typically to a sold-out audience. The trio later moved to Los Angeles to develop the show for television. A live action comedy series of the same name was picked up by Adult Swim on May 7, 2019. Jouhari, Honig, and Stonoha star in and executive produce Three Busy Debras, which is about the "surreal day-to-day lives of three deranged housewives, all named Debra, in their affluent suburban town of Lemoncurd, Connecticut." The series premiered on March 29, 2020.

In 2015, Jouhari and Catherine Cohen, later joined by Patti Harrison, started co-hosting It's A Guy Thing, a monthly show in Brooklyn.

Jouhari co-hosts podcast Urgent Care with Joel Kim Booster + Mitra Jouhari with comedian Joel Kim Booster under Earwolf.

In 2022, Jouhari guest-starred in an episode of Abbott Elementary, where she played an art teacher named Sahar. In 2023 she was cast as the new voice of Cleopatra "Cleo" Smith in the second season of Clone High replacing Christa Miller on the Max streaming service. In 2025, Jouhari shared that she voiced a character in an episode of the series Bob's Burgers, which she cites as a major influence. Jouhari played Claire's roommate Kelly for five episodes of The Bear.

== Personal life ==
Jouhari resides in Los Angeles. She is also a member of the Democratic Socialists of America.

== Filmography ==
=== Film ===
Year	Title	Role	Notes
2017	The Big Sick	Yazmin	
2023	Urkel Saves Christmas: the Movie	Clerk Leslie (voice)	Direct-to-video
TBA	Peaked †	TBA	Filming

=== Television ===
Year	Title	Role	Notes
2015–2018	The Special Without Brett Davis	Various roles	4 episodes
2016	Above Average Presents	Cindi	Episode: "When You Find Out Your Boyfriend Is Short"
2016	Full Frontal with Samantha Bee	Mitra	Episode: "Full Frontal Election Documentary"
2017	Friends from College	Kristen	2 episodes
2017	Broad City	Greeter	Episode: "Twaining Day"
2019	High Maintenance	Mitra	Episode: "Proxy"; also writer
2019	Alternatino with Arturo Castro		Episode: "The Neighbor"
2019, 2021	Miracle Workers	Various	2 episodes; also writer
2020	Search Party	Laney	2 episodes
2020–2023	Big Mouth	Various voices	7 episodes; also writer and story editor
2020–2022	Three Busy Debras	Debra	16 episodes; also creator and writer
2021–2023	Ten Year Old Tom	Nurse Denise (voice)	14 episodes
2022	Abbott Elementary	Sahar	Episode: "Art Teacher"
2022–2023	Human Resources	Waiter / Coyoté Waitress (voice)	2 episodes; also writer
2023	History of the World, Part II	Various	3 episodes
2023–present	Digman!	Saltine (voice)	Main role
2023–2024	Clone High	Cleopatra "Cleo" Smith (voice)	Main role; replacing Christa Miller
2023–2025	The Bear	Kelly	5 episodes
2023	I Think You Should Leave with Tim Robinson		Episode: "CUT TO: WE'RE CHATTING ABOUT THIS AT YOUR BACHELOR PARTY."
2023	Praise Petey	Polli (voice)	2 episodes
2025	Krapopolis	Statue #3 (voice)	Episode: "Mazed and Kingfused"
2025	Bob's Burgers	Regan (voice)	Episode: "Wild Steal-ions"
2026	The Terrors of Jordan Mendoza	Jen	Episode: "This Idiot Is Freaking Out"

== Awards and nominations ==
Year	Award	Category	Nominated work	Results	Ref.
2018	Writers Guild of America Awards	Comedy/Variety Sketch Series	The President Show	Nominated	
2023	Writers Guild of America Awards	Short Form New Media	Three Busy Debras	Won	
