= List of Clone High characters =

List of characters in the TV series Clone High

The main characters of season one of Clone High, from left to right: Mr. Butlertron, JFK, Cleopatra, Abe Lincoln, Joan of Arc, Gandhi and Principal Scudworth.

This is a list of characters that have appeared in the animated science-fiction sitcom series Clone High. The series was created by Phil Lord and Christopher Miller with Bill Lawrence. It still occasionally airs reruns on Teletoon and was briefly aired by MTV and MTV2 in 2003. A second season revival, which was announced in 2021 as part of a two-season 10-episode order, premiered on Max on May 23, 2023.

== Development ==
According to co-creator Christopher Miller, the reason for putting historical figures in a school setting was because "they're sort of mythic figures, even people with a very limited knowledge of history have some preconceived ideas about them, which is part of the fun." co-creator Phil Lord added, "The point of the whole show is that these people are not living up to their genetic forebears." The characters are meant to parody various stereotypes which were prevalent in teen dramas of the early 2000s.

== Main characters ==
=== Season 1 ===
==== Abe ====
Abe Lincoln (voiced by Will Forte) is the clone of Abraham Lincoln, the 16th President of the United States. He is the main protagonist of the first season. Abe is an awkward and clumsy kid who feels he is struggling to live up to the legacy of Abraham Lincoln. He is good friends with Gandhi and Joan, being oblivious to the latter's feelings towards him. He falls for Cleopatra during the first season, only to realize in the last episode of the first season that he is in love with Joan. He spends the second season trying to win her over.

==== Joan ====
Joan of Arc (voiced by Nicole Sullivan) is the clone of Jeanne d'Arc, the devout 15th century French militant. She is the main protagonist of the second season. She is Abe's closest friend and is in love with him. His constant ignorance of this causes her a lot of frustration. She is a goth, and somewhat of an outcast at her school. She spends much of the first season trying to win over Abe, to no avail. In the last episode of the first season, she sleeps with JFK at prom after he shares an encouraging conversation with her. She begins dating him in the second season, but they eventually break up, and she admits she never lost feelings for Abe in the season finale. In season 3, she begins to date Confucius, but her feelings become conflicted during the season's finale when she is left on Cloney Island with Abe and Confucius as it is set to be destroyed.

==== Cleo ====
Cleopatra "Cleo" Smith (voiced by Christa Miller (season 1), Mitra Jouhari (seasons 2-3)) is the clone of Cleopatra VII, the last Pharaoh of Ancient Egypt. Cleopatra is a stereotypical mean girl, very vain and rude to those who are not as popular as her. She loses many of these traits by the end of the second season. She had a rivalry with Joan over Abe, which ended after the first season. She is a bisexual character, dating JFK and Abe in the first season, and Frida Kahlo in the second.

==== JFK ====
JFK (voiced by Christopher Miller) is the clone of John Fitzgerald Kennedy, the 35th President of the United States. JFK is a stereotypical popular high school jock. He is arrogant, competitive, and at times dimwitted. He initially antagonized Abe in the hopes of winning Cleo back from him, but he befriends him by the end of the second season. JFK dated Joan for a period of time in the second season. He speaks with a thick New England dialect and Boston accent that is exaggerated for comical effect, as well as constant insertions of "uh" and "err" into his sentences. He also has a penchant for using dirty jokes and innuendo. In 2020, the show had a resurgence in popularity after multiple voice clips of JFK became popular on TikTok.

==== Gandhi ====
Gandhi (voiced by Michael McDonald) is the clone of Mohandas Karamchand Gandhi, an activist of the Indian Revolution. Gandhi is a hyperactive and immature teenager who wants to be accepted by those around him. He is close friends with Abe and Joan. He has ADHD. His portrayal as a party animal enraged many in India, including prominent members of India's parliament. Hunger strikes at MTV's India headquarters lead to the premature cancellation of the first season of Clone High. He did not return in the second season, although he is shown to still be frozen as of the second season finale.

Gandhi's characterisation as a "party animal" meanwhile received a negative reception in India, culminating in a 150-person hunger strike held outside of MTV's Indian branch in early 2003, leading to Clone High consequently being cancelled. While Gandhi did not return in the 2023 revival of Clone High, Phil Lord stated in March 2023 that while the character would also not appear in either season of the two-season revival, that the character could return if the series was renewed for another season beyond those two.

==== Principal Scudworth ====
Principal Cinnamon J. Scudworth, Ph.D. (voiced by Phil Lord) is a deluded and aggressive scientist. He is the man who created the clones, and he serves as the principal of their school. He is shown to have very little control over his emotions and is prone to violent outbursts. He works for the Secret Board of Shadowy Figures, although he plans to steal the clones from them in order to make his own amusement park, which he dubs "Cloney Island". In the second season finale, he admits that he cares for the clones, and he feels that they are like his children. In the third season, he succeeds in building Cloney Island, capturing the clones and making them work permanent summer jobs. However, the season ends with Cloney Island being on the verge of destruction.

==== Mr. Butlertron ====
Mr. Lynn Butlertron (voiced by Christopher Miller), more commonly referred to as Mr. B., is the loyal robot servant and best friend to Scudworth. He serves as the assistant principal of Clone High. Mr. Butlertron is very human-like, programmed to be sentient and possesses artificial intelligence that enables him to show human emotions, have free will, and have facial expressions. He genuinely cares for Scudworth and the students, often calling people "Wesley."

==== The Shadowy Figure ====
The Secret Board of Shadowy Figures is a ruthless and secretive government organization who employs Principal Scudworth. They are a parody of the CIA. Their ultimate aim is to use the clones for a super army to take over the world. Its chief director is referred to as The Shadowy Figure (voiced by Bill Lawrence). He is often annoyed by Scudworth's incompetence in running Clone High. In the season 1 finale, he plans to take the clones away from Scudworth on prom night. This forces Scudworth to freeze everyone in attendance at prom in a meat locker, including the Shadowy Figures, in order to save the clones and himself. In the second season, the original board is replaced by a new board, led by a woman. The new board is later murdered by Scudworth in the second season's finale. It is not clarified if the original board was ever unfrozen from the meat locker.

=== Seasons 2-3 ===
==== Candide Sampson ====
Candide Sampson (voiced by Christa Miller) is Principal Scudworth's strict, cold-hearted superior in season 2. She was put in charge of him by the new Secret Board of Shadowy Figures. Principal Scudworth is shown to have a brief romantic interest in her, before ultimately attacking her in order to save the clones. She is Joan's foster mother in season 2. In season 3, she becomes the sole member of the Secret Board of Shadowy Figures following their deaths in season 2. She ends up sending a missile to destroy Cloney Island in the season's finale.

Miller originally voiced Cleo in the original Clone High, before being recast in the role and cast as a new character in the 2023 revival due to retrospective concerns about whitewashing.

==== Frida Kahlo ====
Frida Kahlo (voiced by Vicci Martinez) is the clone of Frida Kahlo. She is a very laid-back character, and she enjoys painting. She is best friends with Harriet Tubman. She is queer, as she and Cleopatra begin a romantic relationship.

==== Harriet Tubman ====
Harriet Tubman (voiced by Debra Wilson (season 1), Ayo Edebiri (seasons 2-3)) is the clone of Harriet Tubman. She is very preppy, and is prone to excessive worrying at times. She is Frida's best friend. She and Confucius begun a relationship in season 2, but they broke up in season 3, with Harriet gaining feelings for Toussaint Louverture. She enters a relationship with Toussaint, but breaks up with him as well, being unhappy with how perfect he is.

==== Confucius ====
Confucius (voiced by Kelvin Yu) is the clone of Confucius. He is obsessed with the internet and various social media trends. He was in a relationship with Harriet, but is now dating Joan of Arc.

==== Topher Bus ====
Topher Bus (voiced by Neil Casey) is the clone of Christopher Columbus, who tries to distance himself from his "clone-father" by pretending to be supportive of social movements and minority groups, as well as changing his name. This is a facade, however, as he reveals his true distaste for said groups on several occasions.

== Supporting characters ==
- The Brontë Sisters, three of JFK's frequent girlfriends.
- Catherine the Great (voiced by Murray Miller (season 1), Dannah Phirman (season 2)), one of JFK's frequent girlfriends.
- Genghis Khan (voiced by Lord), a friend of Abe and Gandhi. He is a stereotypical dumb character.
- George Washington Carver (voiced by Donald Faison), a science geek who is obsessed with experimenting on peanuts. He and Gandhi become friends in the first season.
- Glenn the Janitor (voiced by Neil Flynn), the janitor of Clone High and the adoptive father of Ponce de León.
- Ivan the Terrible (voiced by Jeffrey Muller), a frustrated incel who loathes most women and the fact he cannot have sex with them. He is a member of Topher's group of social outcasts, "The Bleacher Creatures."
- Jackée the Ripper (voiced by Jackée Harry), a clone of Jack the Ripper, who is stated to have been a woman. She is a member of The Bleacher Creatures.
- Jesús Cristo (voiced by Jeff Garcia (season 1)): a Latino version of Jesus Christ.
- John Stamos (voiced by himself): Scudworth's arch-nemesis from high school. He is the original version of himself, rather than being a clone.
- Julius Caesar (voiced by Flynn (season 1), Miller (season 3)), a good friend of JFK.
- Marie Curie (voiced by Sullivan), a clone who was morbidly deformed due to the exposure to radiation that was in her clone-mother's DNA. She is a sweet girl and has a crush on Gandhi in the first season.
- Mary (voiced by D'Arcy Carden), a new student at Clone High who begins a relationship with Abe. It is later revealed she is Bloody Mary, and that she intends to steal Abe's soul. She is eventually sent back into the mirror dimension.
- Nostradamus (voiced by Dick (season 1), Richard Kind (season 3)), an unhygienic nerd that enjoys Dungeons & Dragons. He claims to have the ability to see the future, but in reality, he gives vague predictions in the hopes that they will eventually come true.
- Paul Revere (voiced by Zach Braff), a nosy school gossip.
- Peany, an anthropomorphic peanut created by George Washington Carver.
- Ponce de León (voiced by Luke Perry), JFK's best friend. He only appears in one episode of the series, and is killed violently in a litter-related accident.
- Sacagawea (voiced by Jana Schmieding), an outgoing student that often takes part in school events. She briefly hooks up with George Washington Carver in season 2, only to later end up with Anne Boleyn in season 3.
- Scangrade the Magnificent (voiced by Judah Miller), an egotistical and boastful robot, and the nemesis of Mr. B.
- Skunky Poo (voiced by Wilson), a Road Runner-esque rival of Scudworth's.
- Thomas Edison (voiced by Andy Dick), a stereotypical nerd who is a social outcast.
- Toots (voiced by Faison), Joan's adoptive grandfather. He is a blind musician. He dies at some point before the beginning of season 2.
- Toussaint Louverture (voiced by Jermaine Fowler), Confucius's rival to Harriet's affections. He is overly skilled, confident and charismatic.
- Vincent van Gogh (voiced by Dick (season 1), Forte (season 2 and 3)), a quiet painter who is shown to dislike Gandhi. He is often injured for comedic effect.
- Wally and Carl (voiced by Faison and Flynn), JFK's foster fathers.

== Reception ==
Clone High has been praised for its high character development and strong voice acting. Charles Soloman of the LA Times wrote that, "Will Forte's ingenuous Abraham Lincoln and Nicole Sullivan's resigned Joan of Arc steal the show."
