= Bill Lawrence (TV producer) =

American television producer, screenwriter, and director

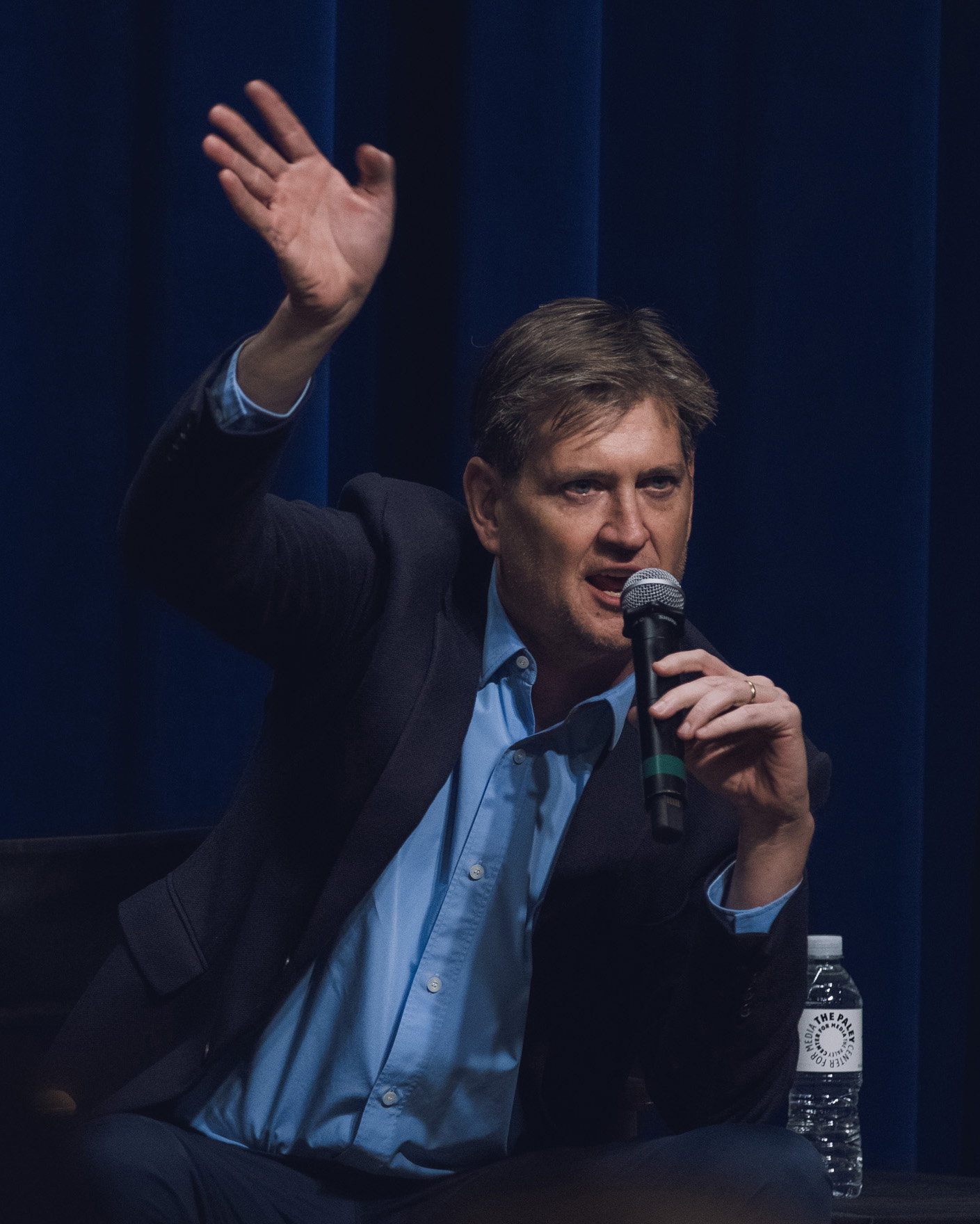
- Lawrence in 2024
- Born: William Van Duzer Lawrence IV; December 26, 1968 (age 57); Ridgefield, Connecticut, U.S.
- Education: College of William and Mary (BA)
- Occupations: Television producer; screenwriter; director
- Years active: 1993–present
- Spouse: Christa Miller (m. 1999)
- Children: 3, including Charlotte

William Van Duzer Lawrence IV (born December 26, 1968) is an American television producer, screenwriter, and director. He is the creator of the series Scrubs and co-creator of Cougar Town, Spin City, Ground Floor, Ted Lasso, Shrinking, and Rooster, as well as the animated series Clone High, in which he also voiced the leader of the shadowy figures. He has written for many other shows, including The Nanny and Boy Meets World.

The name of Lawrence's production company, Doozer, is a wordplay on his middle name.

== Career ==
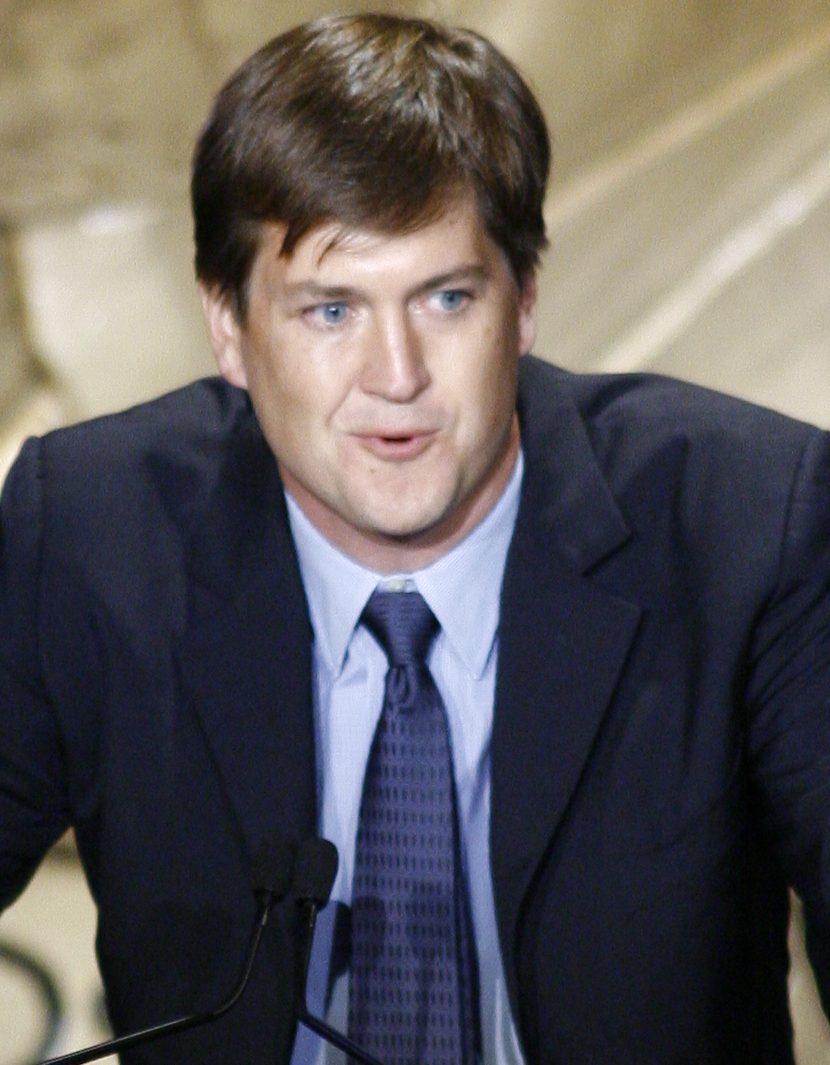
Lawrence receiving the Peabody Award in 2007

Lawrence is a graduate of the College of William & Mary, where he studied English and was a member of Kappa Alpha (KA) social fraternity. After graduating, his first writing job was as a staff writer on the short-lived ABC sitcom Billy. He briefly wrote for Boy Meets World, Friends, and The Nanny, all shows he was fired from. In 1996, he wrote for the short-lived sitcom Champs.

Lawrence's first show as creator was the ABC multi-camera sitcom Spin City, co-created with Champs creator Gary David Goldberg, which originally starred Michael J. Fox as a deputy mayor of New York City. The show lasted for six seasons and won a Primetime Emmy Award and four Golden Globes.

He went on to create the single-camera sitcom Scrubs, which followed the lives of hospital staff. The show premiered in 2001 and ran for 9 seasons in total, 7 on NBC and 2 on ABC. Lawrence wrote, produced and directed the series. The show received critical acclaim, and won a Peabody Award in 2006, and two Emmy Awards with 17 nominations.

His next project was co-creating the 2002 animated sitcom Clone High for MTV with Phil Lord and Chris Miller. The show lasted a single 13-episode season. In 2005, Lawrence co-created the failed The WB pilot Nobody's Watching with Neil Goldman and Garrett Donovan. Lawrence was preparing for his film-directing debut with the film Fletch Won, a prequel to the previous Fletch films, but ultimately left the project after Scrubs star Zach Braff exited the project.

Lawrence co-created the single-camera sitcom Cougar Town, which premiered in 2009 on ABC, with Kevin Biegel. The show is executive produced by series star Courteney Cox and her then-husband David Arquette. Courteney Cox had been a guest star on Lawrence's previous sitcom Scrubs. The show ran from 2009 to 2012 on ABC, then moved to TBS in 2013.

In 2013, Lawrence was involved with three shows that made it to series. He co-created and executive produced the TBS sitcom Ground Floor with Greg Malins; and was also an executive producer of the Fox sitcom Surviving Jack and the NBC sitcom Undateable. After running two seasons, Ground Floor was cancelled. In 2014, Lawrence and four other cast members from Undateable did a standup comedy tour to promote the show. Undateable was cancelled in 2016 after three seasons.

Lawrence wrote a script for the Rush Hour television series, though it was ultimately canceled, after a single season.

In 2017, Lawrence started developing a new multi-camera comedy series called Spaced Out, a show set in the world of commercial space travel. Lawrence is an executive producer for Whiskey Cavalier, described as an action dramedy starring Scott Foley and Lauren Cohan, which was ordered to series at ABC but canceled after 10 episodes.

Lawrence co-created the Apple TV+ series Ted Lasso, which premiered in 2020 and has gone on to win two Primetime Emmy Awards for Outstanding Comedy Series. In 2022, Lawrence signed a new five-year overall deal with Warner Bros. Television Group through 2028.

Lawrence also co-created the Apple TV+ series Shrinking, which premiered in 2023 and stars Jason Segel, Harrison Ford, and Jessica Williams. It has garnered widespread critical acclaim and was nominated for multiple Emmys, including several for Lawrence.

Lawrence co-created Rooster, for HBO, which premiered in 2026, and stars Steve Carell. It has been compared to his other recent TV shows, Ted Lasso and Shrinking. It has been called by some critics as "hangout TV," and "found family TV."

== Personal life ==
Lawrence married actress Christa Miller in 1999. They have three children together, including singer-songwriter Charlotte Lawrence. Miller has been cast in Lawrence projects Scrubs, Clone High, Cougar Town, and Shrinking.

Lawrence is the great-great-grandson of Sarah and William Van Duzer Lawrence, whose home became Sarah Lawrence College.

On July 21, 2017, Lawrence was involved in a plane crash on the East River in New York City with his family. Everyone aboard survived unscathed.

== Filmography ==
=== Television ===
Year	Title	Creator / Showrunner	Director	Writer	Producer	Executive Producer	Notes
1992	Billy	No	No	Yes	No	No	Episode: "Gimme Some Credit"
1993	Boy Meets World	No	No	Yes	No	No	Episode: "The Father/Son Game"
1994	The Nanny	No	No	Yes	No	No	2 episodes
1995	Friends	No	No	Yes	No	No	Episode: "The One with the Candy Hearts"
1996	Champs	No	No	Yes	No	No	2 episodes
1996–2002	Spin City	Yes	No	Yes	No	Yes	
2001–2010	Scrubs	Yes	Yes	Yes	Yes	Yes	
2002–2003, 2023–2024	Clone High	Yes	No	Yes	No	Yes	
2006	Nobody's Watching	Yes	No	Yes	No	Yes	Unaired TV pilot
2009–2015	Cougar Town	Yes	Yes	Yes	No	Yes	
2013–2015	Ground Floor	Yes	No	Yes	No	Yes	
2014	Surviving Jack	No	No	No	No	Yes	
2014–2016	Undateable	No	No	No	No	Yes	
2016	Rush Hour	Yes	No	Yes	No	Yes	
2018	Life Sentence	No	No	No	No	Yes	
2019	Whiskey Cavalier	No	No	No	No	Yes	
2020–present	Ted Lasso	Yes	No	Yes	Yes	Yes	
2021	Head of the Class	No	No	No	No	Yes	
2023–present	Shrinking	Yes	Yes	Yes	No	Yes	
2024–present	Bad Monkey	Yes	No	Yes	No	Yes	
2026–present	Scrubs (2026)	No	No	No	No	Yes	
2026–present	Rooster	Yes	No	Yes	No	Yes	

=== Music videos ===
Year	Title	Artist(s)	Role	Ref.
2022	"Morning"	Charlotte Lawrence	Dad	
