= Christa Miller =

American actress (born 1964)

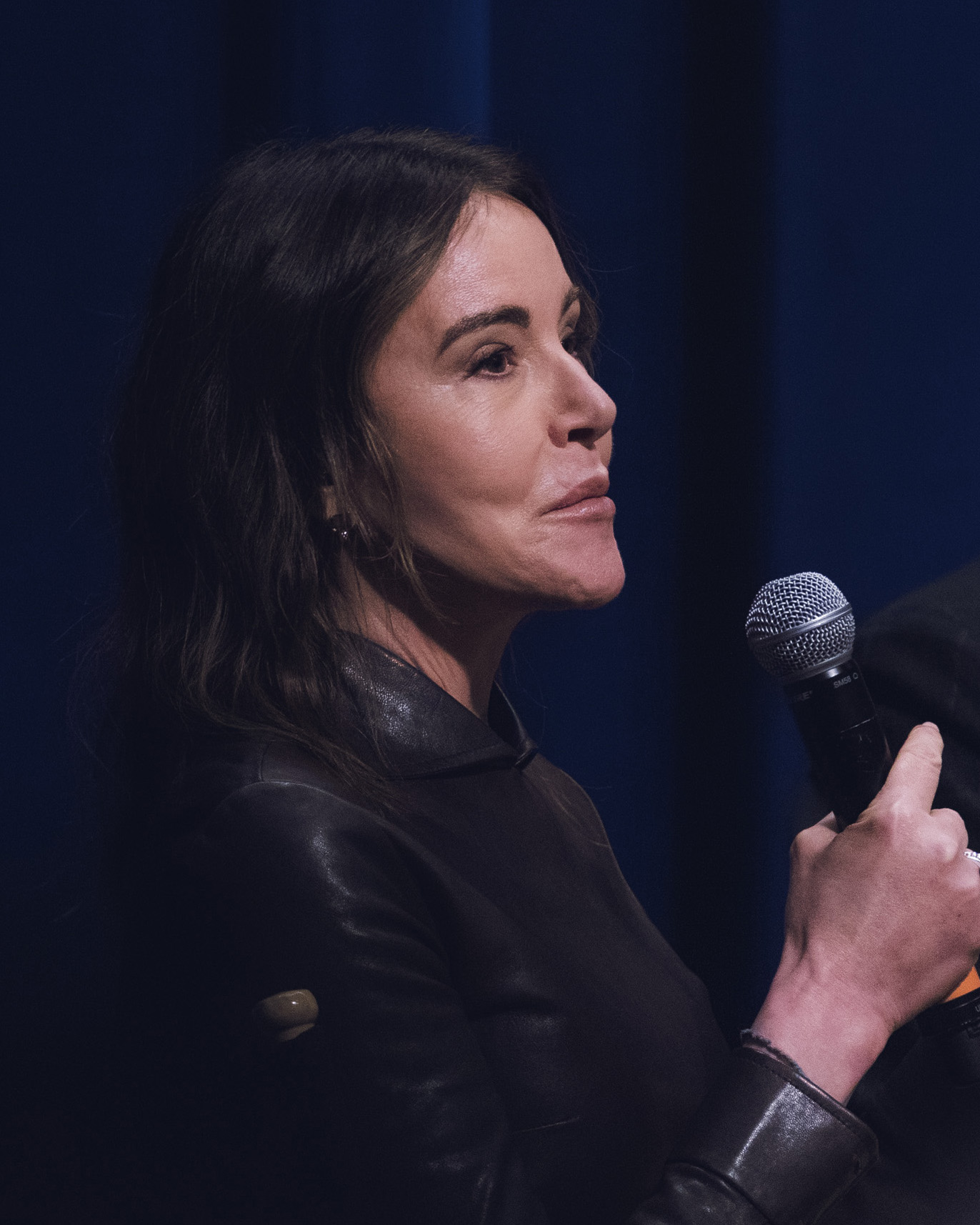
- Miller in 2024
- Born: May 28, 1964 (age 62)
- Occupations: Actress; model
- Years active: 1985–present
- Known for: Kate O'Brien in The Drew Carey Show; Jordan Sullivan in Scrubs; Ellie Torres in Cougar Town
- Spouse: Bill Lawrence (m. 1999)
- Children: 3, including Charlotte Lawrence
- Relatives: Susan Saint James (aunt)

Christa Miller-Lawrence (née Miller; born May 28, 1964) is an American actress known for her roles in television comedies. Her foremost roles include Kate O'Brien in the ABC sitcom The Drew Carey Show, Jordan Sullivan in the NBC/ABC comedy series Scrubs, Ellie Torres in the ABC/TBS sitcom Cougar Town, Liz Bishop in the Apple TV+ comedy drama Shrinking and voicing Cleopatra "Cleo" Smith and Candide Sampson in Clone High. She has also appeared in Seinfeld, The Fresh Prince of Bel-Air and CSI: Miami.

== Early life ==
Miller's days as a child model were curtailed after an operation for a benign bone tumor. After attending Convent of the Sacred Heart, she returned briefly to modeling, but soon took acting lessons, and gave up modeling when she moved to Los Angeles in 1990.

== Career ==
Miller's first role on television was in Kate & Allie, which starred her real-life aunt, Susan Saint James. She then appeared in episodes of Northern Exposure, Fresh Prince of Bel Air, and Party of Five. She had a small role in the horror film Stepfather III (1992) with Priscilla Barnes.

She later appeared twice on Seinfeld, as two different characters. In the 1993 episode "The Sniffing Accountant", she played the prospective boss of George Costanza. She had intended to be a dramatic actress, and this role proved to be a turning point for Miller, who realized how much she enjoyed comedy. Two years later, she returned to Seinfeld in "The Doodle" to play George's girlfriend, Paula. This episode proved to be a boon to her career, as she convinced co-creator Larry David to provide her with a rough-cut video of the still-unaired episode when she auditioned for The Drew Carey Show, whose producers had initially thought she was too inexperienced. David's support helped Miller win over the producers of The Drew Carey Show, who cast her as Kate O'Brien, whom she played from 1995 to 2002.

In 2001, Miller's husband, writer-producer Bill Lawrence, conceived a new comedy drama, Scrubs. Miller was cast in a guest role as Dr. Cox's (John C. McGinley) acerbic ex-wife Jordan Sullivan. Originally, the character was intended to appear in only one episode; in season 2, the role became recurring. Miller also was the voice of Cleopatra in the short-lived animated show Clone High. She had a leading role in the 2008 two-part TV miniseries The Andromeda Strain. She also appeared in the CSI: Miami episode Divorce Party.

In 2009, Miller began starring on Cougar Town, a sitcom created and produced by her husband, and starring Courteney Cox, with whom Miller worked in a three-part story-arc of season 8 of Scrubs.

Since 2023, Miller portrays Liz Bishop on the Apple TV series Shrinking.

== Personal life ==
Miller married Bill Lawrence in 1999. They have three children, including singer / actor Charlotte Lawrence.

== Filmography ==
=== Film ===
Year	Title	Role	Notes
1994	Death of a Cheerleader	Terri	
1995	Love and Happiness		
1997	Kiss & Tell	Alex Stoddard	
1999	Smiling Fish and Goat on Fire	Kathy	
2000	The Operator	Janice Wheelan	
2016	Hot Air	Kate	
2018	Breaking In	Maggie Harris	

=== Television ===
Year	Title	Role	Notes
1985, 1988	Kate & Allie	Student	Episode: "Allie's Affair"
1985, 1988	Kate & Allie	Blair	Episodes: "Allie Doesn't Live Here Anymore" and "The Odd Couples"
1990	Northern Exposure	Laurie Batan	Episode: "Soapy Sanderson"
1992	Stepfather III	Beth Davis	Television film
1993, 1995	Seinfeld	Ellen	Episode: "The Sniffing Accountant"
1993, 1995	Seinfeld	Paula	Episode: "The Doodle"
1994	A Friend to Die For	Terri	Television film
1994	The Fresh Prince of Bel-Air	Girl	Episode: "Who's the Boss?"
1994	Party of Five	Theresa	Episode: "Much Ado"
1995–2002	The Drew Carey Show	Kate O'Brien	Series regular, 183 episodes
2001–2010	Scrubs	Jordan Sullivan	Recurring role, 90 episodes Nominated — Satellite Award for Best Supporting Actress – Series, Miniseries or Television Film (2003–04); Also music supervisor
2002–2003; 2023–2024	Clone High	Cleopatra "Cleo" Smith (voice)	Series regular, 13 episodes
2002–2003; 2023–2024	Clone High	Candide Sampson (voice)	Series regular, season 2–3
2008	The Andromeda Strain	Dr. Angela Noyce	Miniseries
2009	CSI: Miami	Amy Lansing	Episode: "Divorce Party"
2009–2015	Cougar Town	Ellie Torres	Series regular, 102 episodes Gracie Award for Outstanding Female Actor in a Supporting Role in a Comedy Series (2014); Also music supervisor
2015	Undateable	Ally/Jackie	3 episodes
2019	Whiskey Cavalier	Kelly Ashland	Episode: "Two of a Kind"
2020–2023	Ted Lasso		Music supervisor, 18 episodes
2021	Head of the Class	Principal Maris	Recurring role
2023–present	Shrinking	Liz Bishop	Series regular, also music supervisor
2026–present	Scrubs	Jordan Sullivan	Guest role (season 1–present); 2 episodes

=== Music videos ===
Year	Title	Artist(s)	Role	Ref.
2022	"Morning"	Charlotte Lawrence	Mom	
