= List of Crash & Bernstein episodes =

Crash & Bernstein is an American live action television comedy with puppetry which aired from October 8, 2012, to August 11, 2014, on Disney XD.

Created by Eric Friedman, the series centers around a boy with three sisters who wishes to have a brother. His wish come true when a puppet named Crash comes to life.

Throughout its run, 39 episodes of Crash & Bernstein aired.

== Series overview ==
Season	Episodes	Originally released	
Season	Episodes	First released	Last released
1	26	October 8, 2012	September 9, 2013
2	13	October 7, 2013	August 11, 2014

== Episodes ==
=== Season 1 (2012–13) ===
- Cole Jensen, Tim Lagasse and Landry Bender appear in all the episodes.
- Oana Gregory has been absent in 5 episodes.
- Aaron R. Landon has been absent in 7 episodes.

No. overall	No. in season	Title	Directed by	Written by	Original release date	U.S. viewers (millions)
1	1	"Crash Lands"	Bruce Leddy	Eric Friedman	October 8, 2012	0.63
Wyatt, the only boy in a house full of girls, desperately wishes for a brother. This results in him building a puppet at the Build-A-Bestie store. The puppet, named Crash, comes to life, and the two "brothers" plan to get Wyatt his own room. After a failed attempt to get Amanda to leave, Crash cuts down the apartment wall with a power saw, leading to an argument between the two. Crash leaves when Wyatt says he doesn't want a brother who just destroys things. Crash then goes to the arcade to apologize to Wyatt and promises he won't cause any more trouble. Crash then takes responsibility for the wall. The apartment's landlord Mr. Poulos gives Crash a job of destroying the Build-A-Bestie store. Crash agrees, but only if he gets to bring Wyatt. Guest stars: Mary Birdsong as Mel, Mckenna Grace as Jasmine, Danny Woodburn as Mr. Poulos, Eric Price as Bestie Store Employee
2	2	"Scaredy Crash"	Robbie Countryman	T. Sean Shannon	October 15, 2012	0.46
Crash tries to help Wyatt conquer his fear of insects (after he put Scottie's pet tarantula in his mouth), but then Crash develops a fear of moustaches after getting a shot at the doctor's office. In the end, Crash helps Wyatt overcome his fear of bugs by taking him to watch Tug Fly the Bug Guy, a bug specialist, perform at school. Meanwhile, Amanda sees "Bloody Butcher 2: Chop House of Gore" (a horror movie based on Crash's favorite telenovela that revolves around a murderous butcher) and, as a result, starts freaking out when people appear out of nowhere and develops a phobia for meat and anything that has to do with butchery even though Mel claimed to have seen it. When Mel does see the movie, she has the same reaction that Amanda had. Guest stars: Mary Birdsong as Mel, Rizwan Manji as Dr. Gordon, Matt Champagne as Tug Fly the Bug Guy, Curtis Harris as Scottie
3	3	"Coach Crash"	Bruce Leddy	Jim Armogida & Steve Armogida	October 22, 2012	0.47
Crash takes over as coach of Wyatt's basketball team, after insulting the last one who then quit, and intends to help break the squad's losing streak. However, Crash focuses on all the wrong things about being a coach, and later ends up benching Wyatt for a taller basketball player. Meanwhile, Cleo takes her business into the fashion industry by making jerseys for the basketball team, and Amanda tries to raise money to buy a pair of sunglasses. Guest stars: Mary Birdsong as Mel, Mckenna Grace as Jasmine, Brian Huskey as Coach Vanover, Jay Ellis as Derek
4	4	"Educating Crash"	Bruce Leddy	Mike Larsen	October 29, 2012	0.57
After driving Mel nuts at home, Crash attends school with Wyatt. However, Crash watched a late-night movie marathon about prisons the night before and is convinced that school is actually prison. Crash takes on The Slapper (the meanest kid in Linus Pauling Middle School) which makes him and Wyatt popular. However, Crash gets in trouble with Vice-Principal Takashi after setting off the fire alarm and Wyatt takes the blame for Crash. At home, Crash has nowhere to sleep as he keeps sleeping on Cleo's side of the room, so he cuts off half of Cleo's mattress and makes himself a bed above Wyatt. Guest stars: Mary Birdsong as Mel, Karen Maruyama as Vice-Principal Takashi, Curtis Harris as Scottie, Zachary Conneen as Slapper Note: This episode was supposed to be aired as the 2nd episode which is why Crash is just getting a bed and is just going to school.
5	5	"Party Crasher"	Robbie Countryman	Ryan Levin	November 5, 2012	0.76
Pesto wants Crash's and Wyatt's help to get him into a high school pool party to which Amanda has been invited. After several failed attempts to get Trey, the party host, to like them, Wyatt over-compliments Amanda and she gets him invited. Crash thinks he has ruined his and Pesto's chances after spilling lemonade into Trey's bike helmet, but confesses and they all get invited. Guest star: Mike C. Manning as Trey
6	6	"Home Alone... With Crash"	Bruce Leddy	David Nichols	November 12, 2012	0.69
Crash convinces Amanda to go to the arcade and tutor a student, leaving him and Wyatt in charge. Jasmine manages to get stuck in wall vent during a game of hide and seek and Mr. Poulos has the only keys for the other end to get her out after he accidentally locked her in. Wyatt and Crash get caught while attempting to steal the keys, but the kids still are able to free Jasmine. Mr. Poulos threatens to call Mel, but doesn't after Wyatt blackmails him by mentioning that the part with Jasmine getting locked in the wall vent happened on his watch. Crash and Mr. Poulos then spend an evening on the balcony acting like southern gentlemen as Mel tries to join them. Guest stars: Mary Birdsong as Mel, Mckenna Grace as Jasmine, Danny Woodburn as Mr. Poulos Absent: Aaron R. Landon as Pesto
7	7	"Motorcycle Crash"	Bruce Leddy	Eric Friedman	November 26, 2012	0.60
A battle of one-upmanship erupts between Crash and Pesto, who both want to be Wyatt's one and only best friend, as whichever 2 friends can get the highest score on the arcade's retiring motorcycle video game will get to have their picture taken and put on the Wall of Fame. When Wyatt tries to convince the two to get along, they end up becoming best friends, leaving Wyatt out. Meanwhile, Crash and Cleo try to cover up the damages to the couch their fighting caused before Mel finds out. Guest star: Mary Birdsong as Mel Absent: Oana Gregory as Amanda
8	8	"Undercover Crash"	Rich Correll	Ryan Levin	January 14, 2013	0.41
Not knowing the difference between legal and illegal, Crash steals several items, including some prizes from the arcade and a car, and takes them home. A shocked Wyatt teaches Crash that taking items belonging to other people is wrong. While returning the stolen items, the boys encounter Doris, an elderly con artist asking for donations. Crash and Wyatt keep Doris busy until the cops arrive. Guest stars: Jill Basey as Doris, Karl T. Wright as Cop
9	9	"System Crash"	Rich Correll	Tiffany Lo & Ethel Lung	January 21, 2013	0.49
After noticing how everyone in the family is very tech-savvy, Crash gets Wyatt to teach him to use the computer. However, just as Crash becomes obsessed with technology, an intense windstorm causes the Internet and phone to go down. Amanda, her friend Jennifer and Cleo resort to improvising until the systems come back on. When things get worse, Mr. Poulos suggests everyone play a game of living-room football. The two teams consist of Crash, Wyatt, and Jennifer against Cleo, Mr. Poulos, and Amanda. Guest stars: Danny Woodburn as Mr. Poulos, Mckenna Grace as Jasmine, Sadie Calvano as Jennifer Absent: Aaron R. Landon as Pesto
10	10	"Crash Crush"	Dan Milano	T. Sean Shannon	January 28, 2013	0.34
At Jasmine's sixth birthday party, Crash develops a crush on a puppet named Lola (who he thinks is alive) and begins dating her. When he learns that Lola's puppeteer has been taking advantage of Crash, Wyatt tries to prove to Crash that Lola is a puppet and get him to break up with her. Meanwhile, Mel and Cleo try to get Jasmine to like their birthday gifts. Guest stars: Mary Birdsong as Mel, Mckenna Grace as Jasmine, Patrick Bristow as Puppeteer Absent: Oana Gregory as Amanda, Aaron R. Landon as Pesto
11	11	"Shorty Crash"	Brent Carpenter	Jim Armogida & Steve Armogida	February 4, 2013	0.50
Crash goes through extreme measures in order to make himself taller after being turned away from riding on a roller coaster called the Decapitator, but then learns about the benefits of being short from Mr. Poulos. Wyatt attempts to make it through Picture Day without hurting himself under threat from Mel that she'll give the $100 he gets from Grandma Rose to charity. This proves to be difficult when he gets gum caught on his hair as Amanda tries to fix it before Picture Day. Meanwhile, Cleo tries her first make-up project that makes Mel's face partially purple due to an allergic reaction to one of the ingredients of the make-up. Guest stars: Mary Birdsong as Mel, Danny Woodburn as Mr. Poulos
12	12	"Release the Crashen"	Sean Mulcahy	Erinne Dobson & Shannon Fopeano	February 11, 2013	N/A
Crash and Wyatt receive an unwelcomed house guest named Gerry as Mel forces them to hang out with their annoying new neighbor who has some strange and bizarre habits. As payback, Wyatt and Crash force Mel to spend time with Gerry's mother Gretchen who has the same habits that Gerry has. Guest stars: Mary Birdsong as Mel, Mckenna Grace as Jasmine, Katya Lidsky as Gretchen, Joe DiGiovanni as Gerry Absent: Oana Gregory as Amanda, Aaron R. Landon as Pesto
13	13	"Cold Hard Crash"	Sean Mulcahy	Tim Brenner	February 18, 2013	0.59
Crash gets rich when the Bernstein's next door neighbor Ms. Lopez moves away to Alaska and leaves Crash her fortune and pet cats. Meanwhile, Wyatt competes against Scottie for President of the Snowboard Club, but the relationship between the two brothers becomes strained after Crash uses his newfound wealth to buy the election. Guest stars: Danny Woodburn as Mr. Poulos, Mckenna Grace as Jasmine, Curtis Harris as Scottie, Peggy Blow as Mrs. Lopez, Connor Weil as Spencer
14	14	"Crashtagion"	Bruce Leddy	David Nichols	February 25, 2013	0.56
Right before Wyatt and Crash are about to go on the school camping trip, Amanda, Cleo, Mel and Jasmine all contract the flu. As a result, Wyatt and Crash are forced to nurse them back to health and won't be able to go on the camping trip until they're feeling better. After learning all about germs, Crash instantly becomes a germaphobe and works to keep himself from getting infected. However, he ends up getting sick later on and pukes purple fluid all around the bubble he encased himself in. In the end, the girls are all healthy again, and Crash has to stay in bed. Cleo and Amanda get revenge on Crash for picking on them while they were sick by making him think he accidentally cooked Wyatt into his soup. Guest star: Mary Birdsong as Mel Absent: Aaron R. Landon as Pesto
15	15	"Crash Jacked"	Sean Mulcahy	Story by : Clark Taylor; Teleplay by : Mike Larsen	March 4, 2013	0.67
Wyatt tries to reason with his school bully, Rufus, AKA The Slapper, who is stealing everyone's stuff. When Wyatt refuses to give Rufus his bicycle, Rufus kidnaps Crash and holds him hostage until Wyatt agrees to give up the ride. However, Crash's annoying and crazy antics cause Rufus to regret his decision. Meanwhile, Amanda thinks Mel tries to murder Crash, after he accidentally destroyed most of the living room, and fears that she could be next, when she accidentally ruins one of Mel's blouses with lipstick. Mel also takes advantage of this when Cleo informs her. Guest stars: Mary Birdsong as Mel, Zachary Conneen as Slapper
16	16	"Crash vs. Flex"	Bruce Leddy	Lisa K. Nelson	March 11, 2013	0.35
While Wyatt is gathering stuff for the school's rummage sale, he finds one of his old toys named Flex Fletcher, and spends a lot of time playing with it. Crash becomes insanely jealous and tries to get rid of the toy by any means necessary. Meanwhile, Cleo creates a money-making venture at the rummage sale and Amanda raises money for new boots to wear at a party. Guest stars: Mary Birdsong as Mel, Mckenna Grace as Jasmine, Daniel Roebuck as Ed
17	17	"Crashus Maximus"	Sean Mulcahy	Matt Price	March 18, 2013	0.42
While working with Wyatt on a report about the Roman Empire, Crash gets struck by lightning and receives multiple personalities which consist of Chef Crash, Caveman Crash, Southern Millionaire Crash, Cat Crash, and the gladiator Maximus Octavius. Guest stars: Mary Birdsong as Mel, Mckenna Grace as Jasmine, Eric Price as Dr. Eric, Amy Farrington as Ms. Harris
18	18	"Crashlemania"	Shelley Jensen	Jim Armogida & Steve Armogida	March 25, 2013	0.54
Crash, Wyatt and Pesto join the school wrestling team, run by Coach Urkhart, and Crash plans to actually wrestle against opponents. However, when Wyatt gets kicked off the team due to Crash's antics, Crash tries to help Wyatt get back on with help from Mr. Poulos, who reveals that he was once a professional wrestler, and that Coach Urkhart was his former wrestling partner. Meanwhile, Cleo goes undercover for the school newspaper as a cheerleader in a plan to expose the dark side of cheerleading until she learns from Amanda, the new assistant cheerleading coach, about the benefits of being a cheerleader. Guest stars: Danny Woodburn as Mr. Poulos, Chip Chinery as Coach Urkhart
19	19	"Comic Book Crash"	Shelley Jensen	Jason Nash	April 15, 2013	0.29
Wyatt and Crash create a comic book series called "The Shredder and Mr. Purple" which becomes a hit in school and on the news-stand. When Wyatt and Crash decide to create a movie based on Wyatt's comic with Mr. Poulos being the film director, they begin to argue about what to do with the script for the movie. Guest stars: Danny Woodburn as Mr. Poulos, Mckenna Grace as Jasmine, Ron Funches as Roland, Curtis Harris as Scottie, Kurt Long as News Anchor, Tony Cavalero as Thief
20	20	"Parade Crasher"	Rich Correll	Erinne Dobson & Shannon Fopeano	April 22, 2013	0.43
Wyatt and Crash help Roland prepare for the annual Portland Day Parade in order for them to complete the two hours of community service, which will allow them to move on to Grade 8. Meanwhile, Amanda plans to be the new Sacagawea for the parade, only to later come into conflict with the old one. Guest stars: Mary Birdsong as Mel, Ron Funches as Roland, Peggy Miley as Rosie
21	21	"Crashy McSmartypants"	Sean Mulcahy	Mike Larsen	June 25, 2013	0.40
Crash becomes a local celebrity after he gets a job with Wyatt at Roland's newsstand in order to score money for wrestling tickets and offers silly, outlandish, and nonsensical advice to customers which somehow pays off. While Crash is showered with praise from his neighbors and even lands a book deal, a shocked Mel tries to convince everyone that Crash doesn't know what he's talking about before things get out of hand. Meanwhile, Cleo holds a meeting with her friends who have been appointed as Cleo's board of directors and later plans to take advantage of Crash's popularity by making him the spokesperson for her company. Guest stars: Mary Birdsong as Mel, Ron Funches as Roland, Katya Lidsky as Gretchen, Andy Kindler as Andy Absent: Oana Gregory as Amanda, Aaron R. Landon as Pesto Note: The title is a reference to "Arty McSmartypants", a character from Between the Lions Tim Lagasse originally puppeteered.
22	22	"Monster Crash"	Bruce Leddy	David Nichols	July 8, 2013	0.84
Crash believes a trucker hat that he found at the Muddy Melee monster truck event brings him luck. When Crash's hat goes missing, Crash suspects that someone took it and starts grilling everybody, including Wyatt, in order to find out the answer. Guest stars: Mary Birdsong as Mel, Danny Woodburn as Mr. Poulos, Mckenna Grace as Jasmine
23	23	"Crash Asks Too Many Questions"	Sean Mulcahy	Eric Friedman	July 15, 2013	0.62
Crash is introduced to Cassie (the voice-assistant app on Wyatt's phone and a parody of Siri) and becomes obsessed with it barraging it with nonsensical questions. The actual Cassie that provides the voice for the app shows up at the Bernstein residence and tries to get back at Crash for getting her fired from her job. Meanwhile, Wyatt plans to enter his family on the game show "Crazy Family Awesome Time Portland", Amanda lies to Mel by stating that she had taken archery lessons as a cover-up for her going to the mall while Cleo covers up her recent job at the bank. Guest stars: Mary Birdsong as Mel, Jaime Andrews as Cassie, Graham Clarke as Chip Absent: Aaron R. Landon as Pesto
24	24	"Crash the Man"	Sean Mulcahy	Doc Kemker	July 22, 2013	0.50
In an effort at manning up the boys, Mr. Poulos puts them through a power-tool boot camp while simultaneously using them to get his work done so he can go on a camping trip with some friends, including DeSean Jackson. When Wyatt, Crash, and Pesto find out about the trip, they sneak into the van to tag along in order to prove themselves as "real men", and end up getting more than they bargained for. Guest stars: DeSean Jackson as himself, Danny Woodburn as Mr. Poulos, Ron Funches as Roland, Chip Chinery as Coach Urkhart Absent: Oana Gregory as Amanda
25–26	25–26	"Crash on the Run"	Bruce Leddy	Lisa K. Nelson (Part 1); Eric Friedman (Part 2)	September 9, 2013	0.53
Wyatt learns there is a major recall on Build-a-Bestie dolls due to a combustibility issue with last year's models. At first Wyatt and Crash avoid this after they discover the Build-a-Bestie doll recall involving the old models shredded by a wood chipper. However, the boys soon find themselves on the run when a Build-a-Bestie Retrieval Unit agent named Mr. Green (John P. Farley) is dispatched to capture and destroy Crash. After Mr. Green has captured Crash, Wyatt fools Mr. Green by throwing a decoy into the wood chipper before they make a successful escape. Wyatt then has to cover-up Crash's demise when Mr. Green gets suspicious. Crash's plan to go incognito backfires when he ends up captured once more by Mr. Green and brought to the house of his mother Carol Green, causing Wyatt to lead his family in a rescue mission to save his brother. Guest stars: Mary Birdsong as Mel, Danny Woodburn as Mr. Poulos, John P. Farley as Mr. Green, Amy Okuda as Slater, Andrea Martin as Mother Green, Mckenna Grace as Jasmine, Ron Funches as Roland

=== Season 2 (2013–14) ===
- On April 15, 2013, Disney XD renewed the series for a second season, which premiered on October 7, 2013.
- "Escape from Bigfoot Island" premiered on July 18, 2014, as part of the Show Me the Shark special featuring other Disney XD original series episodes with shark themed titles: Mighty Med (Are You Afraid of the Shark?), Kickin It (Tightroping the Shark), Lab Rats (Cyborg Shark Attack), Randy Cunningham: 9th Grade Ninja (On the Poolfront/Flume-Ignation) and Wander Over Yonder (The Party Animal).
- Cole Jensen and Tim Lagasse appear in all the episodes.
- Landry Bender, Oana Gregory and Aaron R. Landon have been absent in 3 episodes each.

No. overall	No. in season	Title	Directed by	Written by	Original release date	U.S. viewers (millions)
27	1	"The Nosejob Job"	Bruce Leddy	Eric Friedman	October 7, 2013	0.61
Crash going through the options of a possible nose to add to his face. Meanwhile, Wyatt and Pesto look for a place to hang out when Amanda, Cleo, and Jasmine take over their usual hang-outs in the apartment with Amanda's modeling plans, Cleo's dance parties, and Jasmine's hide and seek activities. They find a vacant lot in an abandoned fireworks factory, but will need to challenge a group of nerdy high school boys in order to claim the hangout for themselves Guest stars: Mckenna Grace as Jasmine, Matthew Van Oss as Quince
28	2	"Health-O-Ween"	Bruce Leddy	Mike Larsen	October 14, 2013	0.61
Wyatt is excited for Halloween as he plans to come up with the scariest costume for a contest at his school's high school where the winner gets into the high school's Nightmare Society, who have pulled off epic scares every Halloween. However, the traditions of Halloween are wanting to be changed by Gretchen (aka Mrs. Phlerger), who is now head of the activist group P.O.O.P. (Pauling Organization Of Parents). When Mrs. Phlerger plans to promote Health-O-Ween to the United States, Wyatt, Crash, Pesto, and Cleo receive help from the Nightmare Society to turn the tables on Mrs. Phlerger and get Halloween back to normal. Guest stars: Katya Lidsky as Gretchen, Chip Chinery as Coach Urkhart
29	3	"Crash Is Having a Baby"	Sean Mulcahy	Steve Armogida & Jim Armogida	October 21, 2013	0.43
Crash, Wyatt, and Pesto end up parenting some eggs as part of a school science project given to them by Coach Urkhart. After the science project, Crash becomes emotionally attached to his egg and refuses to dispose of it, which disrupts Wyatt and Pesto's plans to see an aircraft carrier pull into the harbor from their hangout. Meanwhile, Pesto tries to prove to Amanda that he can be a responsible parent, and Mel trains Cleo so that she can pass gym class. Guest stars: Mary Birdsong as Mel, Chip Chinery as Coach Urkhart
30	4	"Trash & Bernstein"	Hugh Martin	Natalie Barbrie & Tim Brenner	October 28, 2013	0.63
Wyatt, Crash, and Pesto compete against Cleo's team in a cup-stacking competition run by Coach Urkhart. Outside the competition, Crash starts to use the garbage gathered in the hangout where the toxic fumes start to affect Crash's brain and makes him think that the trash heap is talking to him. Meanwhile, Amanda sprains her ankle and Pesto waits on her which affects his training for the cup-stacking competition. Guest star: Chip Chinery as Coach Urkhart
31	5	"Frat Chance"	Sean Mulcahy	Jon Ross	November 18, 2013	0.59
While visiting a local university with Crash, Wyatt is mistaken for a kid genius, and he plays along, since the mix-up will allow him and Crash to become the newest members of the Beta Rho Omega fraternity. However, Wyatt gets kicked out of the frat when the truth about him is revealed, and later ends up having to teach Crash a lesson about brotherhood when the members of the frat start taking advantage of Crash and using him to commit crimes. Meanwhile, Amanda pulls a sneaky prank on Cleo and Pesto. Guest stars: Tyler Ross as Tad Chamberlain, Cleo Berry as Anvil, Peggy Blow as Mrs. Lopez
32	6	"Action Zero"	Victor Gonzalez	Doc Kemker	November 19, 2013	0.34
Crash becomes over-confident after Wyatt lets him win at wrestling and plans to upstage action star Jake Mahoney by challenging him to a fight. Guest star: Aaron Hendry as Jake Mahoney
33	7	"Like Father, Like Purple"	Sean Mulcahy	Mike Larsen	November 20, 2013	0.37
Wyatt's father, Karl Bernstein returns from his globetrotting adventures as a wildlife photographer and spends a lot of time with Wyatt working on a school project, causing a jealous Crash to believe Karl is stealing his best friend. This results in Crash and Karl competing against each other in a battle of one-upmanship, much to the chagrin of Wyatt, who really just wants the two to get along as friends. Meanwhile, Amanda has Karl take modeling shots of her, and Cleo practices for the father-daughter dance. Guest stars: Mary Birdsong as Mel, Richard Ruccolo as Karl Absent: Aaron R. Landon as Pesto
34	8	"Merry Crashenfest"	Sean Mulcahy	Jon Ross	December 3, 2013	0.54
As the holidays approach, Crash is surprised to learn that the Bernsteins celebrate Hanukkah, and later learns about how different cultures have their own holiday traditions. Determined to make the holiday season his own, Crash decides to create his own crazy holiday and dubs it Crashenfest. Meanwhile, when Great Aunt Biddy stops by, the Bernsteins compete to win the money that she plans to give out while preparing to tolerate her bad-tasting fruitcake. Guest stars: Mary Birdsong as Mel, Mckenna Grace as Jasmine, Richard Ruccolo as Karl Absent: Aaron R. Landon as Pesto
35	9	"Duck, Duck, Crash"	Marian Deaton	Shannon Fopeano	July 7, 2014	N/A
Mel grounds Crash and Wyatt after Crash's gravity experiment damages the door of Old Man Shubb's store. As Mel takes Cleo and Amanda out to Coaster World for the day, Karl is left behind to watch over Crash and Wyatt where they must handle the fruit job for Old Man Shubb in exchange that he doesn't press charges. When Crash unknowingly destroys Mel's beloved pet ash jar Pookins, it is witnessed by Jasmine who was accidentally left behind. Now Crash, Wyatt, and Karl must find a way to keep Jasmine from telling Mel about what happened to Pookins. Guest stars: Mary Birdsong as Mel, Mckenna Grace as Jasmine, Richard Ruccolo as Karl Absent: Landry Bender as Cleo, Oana Gregory as Amanda, Aaron R. Landon as Pesto
36	10	"Escape from Bigfoot Island"	Bruce Leddy	Doc Kemker	July 18, 2014	N/A
Wyatt, Crash, and Pesto go with Mr. Poulos on a fishing trip. After narrowly evading a lake shark, the group washes up on the mysterious Bigfoot Island, where they become stranded after Crash uses the wood from Mr. Poulos' boat to make a fire. Things spiral out of control when Crash ends up sighting what might be Bigfoot living on the island, and an eager Wyatt tries to capture a photo of the beast. The creature, however, later turns out to be a man named Jeff who also got stranded on the island. Guest stars: Danny Woodburn as Mr. Poulos, Bill Fagerbakke as Jeff Absent: Landry Bender as Cleo, Oana Gregory as Amanda
37	11	"Monkey Business"	Eric Dean Seaton	Natalie Barbrie & Tim Brenner	July 21, 2014	N/A
Crash eats Mr. Poulos's book, called "Grease Monkey", a motorcycle repair manual, and becomes a professional motorcycle mechanic. Wyatt and Crash take advantage of Crash's newfound skills and open their own repair shop. However, Crash loses his touch when he passes part of the book out of his system after going to the bathroom, leading to problems. Meanwhile, Pesto goes on a police ride-along with somewhat misguided Police Officer Plotkin. Guest stars: Danny Woodburn as Mr. Poulos, Kelly Perine as Officer Plotkin Absent: Landry Bender as Cleo, Oana Gregory as Amanda
38	12	"Flushed in Space"	Brent Carpenter	Steve Armogida & Jim Armogida	July 28, 2014	0.48
While on a field trip at the Bixby Spaceport owned by Trent Bixby, Crash talks his way onto a space shuttle by passing himself as a dot.com billionaire. He ends up dragging Wyatt, Pesto, and Amanda with him on a rocket trip with some other celebrities. Things go from bad to worse when Crash flushes himself out of the shuttle and into space during the flight and Trent, who just so happens to be piloting the rocket, hits his head on the ceiling and gets knocked out cold, putting everybody on the spacecraft in grave danger. Meanwhile, Cleo meets Trent Bixby's sister Sheela after Crash and Wyatt trick her off the shuttle. Guest stars: Johnathan McClain as Trent Bixby
39	13	"Double Header"	Luis Fonsi	Eric Friedman	August 11, 2014	N/A
Wyatt and Crash get an opportunity to host "The Wyatt and Crash Show" on Linus Pauling Middle School's TV network. When Wyatt pops a pimple on Crash during their show, a head named Tucker Taylor emerges in its place and threatens to usurp Crash and take over the show. Meanwhile, Amanda practices her insults and learns some tips from Cleo when she gets a job at Piehole Pizza (a pizzeria that insults the customers). Guest stars: Rizwan Manji as Dr. Gordon, Brian Scolaro as Jimmy, Rob Saunders as Tucker Taylor Note: This is the series finale.
