= Gary Bender =

American sports commentator

- Born: Gary Nedrow Bender; September 1, 1940 (age 86); Norton, Kansas, U.S.
- Education: Wichita State University (BA); University of Kansas (MA)
- Occupation: Sportscaster
- Years active: 1969–2011
- Spouse: Linda Bender
- Children: 2, including Trey
- Relatives: Landry Bender (granddaughter); Amy Bender (daughter-in-law)
- Sports commentary career
- Genre: Play-by-play
- Sports: American football; baseball; basketball

Gary Nedrow Bender (born September 1, 1940) is a retired American sportscaster and 2008 inductee into the Kansas Sports Hall of Fame. He officially retired, April 13, 2011, from Fox Sports Arizona after 18 years calling the NBA's Phoenix Suns games. Gary Bender has also worked as a play by play man for the NBA on TNT mainly during the NBA Playoffs.

== Biography ==
=== Early career ===
Bender, who was born in Norton, Kansas, and raised in Ulysses, Kansas, graduated from Ulysses High School in 1958. He then attended Wichita State University (then known as the University of Wichita), graduating with a journalism degree in 1962 and a master's degree from the University of Kansas in 1964. Bender then began his broadcasting career calling games at Hutchinson Community College in Hutchinson, Kansas. He then went on to do the same at the University of Kansas' football and basketball programs in the 1960s. He also spent years as a broadcaster in Wisconsin and called all of the Wisconsin Athletic Association championship games, as well as Green Bay Packers radio and Milwaukee Brewers television in the early 1970s.

=== CBS Sports (1975-1987) ===
He did play-by-play for the NFL on CBS from 1975 to 1981, and again in 1986 (among his partners were Johnny Unitas, Sonny Jurgensen, Hank Stram, and John Madden, all members of the Pro Football Hall of Fame) and the 1981 NBA Finals along with color commentators Rick Barry and Bill Russell, both members of the Basketball Hall of Fame.

He was CBS' first play-by-play announcer for the network's coverage of the NCAA Division I men's basketball tournament, calling the Final Four alongside Billy Packer in 1982, 1983 and 1984. In 1982 and 1983, he was CBS' lead college football play-by-play man.

=== ABC Sports (1987-1992) ===
On October 26, 1987, Bender (along with Lynn Swann) called the Monday Night Football game between the Denver Broncos and the Minnesota Vikings. That game had been scheduled for October 25, but when the Minnesota Twins (who at the time, shared the Hubert H. Humphrey Metrodome with the Vikings) played Game 7 of the World Series that day, the football game was moved to Monday and shown to a regional audience.

In 1988, Bender did play-by-play for the American League Championship Series alongside Baseball Hall of Famers Joe Morgan and Reggie Jackson.

He also announced college football games for ABC Sports, where he formerly worked alongside Dick Vermeil.

==== Major League Baseball on ABC ====
As previously mentioned, Bender did play-by-play for the 1988 American League Championship Series between the Oakland Athletics and Boston Red Sox. Bender spent two years (1987-1988) as the #2 baseball play-by-play man for ABC behind Al Michaels. Bender worked the backup Monday Night Baseball broadcasts (with Tim McCarver in 1987 and Joe Morgan in 1988) as well as serving as a field reporter/post-game interviewer for ABC's 1987 World Series coverage.

Gary Bender would ultimately be taken off ABC's baseball team in favor of Gary Thorne in 1989.

=== TNT Sports ===
Bender also called NFL games for TNT from 1992 to 1994, teaming with Pat Haden. Bender also did play-by-play for The NBA on TNT from 1992 to 1995, calling games with various color commentators including Chuck Daly, Jack Givens, Mike Glenn, Dick Versace, as well as his former NBA on CBS partners Hubie Brown and Doug Collins. He returned to the NBA on TNT to help with coverage for the 2004 NBA Playoffs, calling games with Rex Chapman and John Thompson. On December 17, 2009, Bender filled in for Marv Albert, who was battling throat problems, to call the Phoenix Suns at Portland Trail Blazers game on TNT and called the game with Reggie Miller.

=== FSN-Arizona and Versus ===
As previously mentioned, for 18 years, Bender was the television play-by-play announcer on Fox Sports Net (FSN-Arizona) for the National Basketball Association's Phoenix Suns; he worked alongside former Suns players Eddie Johnson and Scott Williams. In 2006, he was named as the play-by-play announcer for the Versus network's coverage of Mountain West Conference football, where he would be partnered with former NFL player Glenn Parker.

=== Personal life ===
Bender is also co-author with Michael Johnson of the biography Call of the Game, in which he shares his life story, tips on how to become a better broadcaster, and his Christian testimony.

Bender did a series of Kendall Motor Oil commercials in mid-1980s.

In the first five months of 2001, Bender presided as host of the nationally syndicated Focus on the Family radio show after the resignation of previous host Mike Trout (1985–2000) because of an extramarital affair. Bender was replaced on a full-time basis by Focus vice president of broadcasting John Fuller.

Gary Bender is an alumnus of the Kansas Delta chapter of Phi Delta Theta at Wichita State where he received his bachelor's degree. He received his master's degree in radio and TV from the University of Kansas.

His son, Trey, is also a sportscaster and played Pop Warner Little Scholars. He portrayed his father in season 2 of the HBO series, Winning Time: The Rise of the Lakers Dynasty. His granddaughter Landry Bender is an actress who is best known in Crash & Bernstein and Fuller House.

== Career timeline ==
=== Television ===
Year	Title	Role	Network
1969–1975	WKOW-TV	Sports Director	ABC
1975–1976	Milwaukee Brewers	Play-by-play	
1975–1981, 1986	NFL on CBS	Play-by-play	CBS
1977, 1979—1986	NBA on CBS	Play-by-Play (Lead Play-by-Play from 1980—1981)	CBS
1981–1987	College Basketball on CBS	Play-by-Play (Lead Play-by-Play from 1981–1984)	CBS
1982–1986	College Football on CBS	Play-by-Play (Lead Play-by-play in 1982 and 1983)	CBS
1987–1988	MLB on ABC	#2 Play-by-Play	ABC
1987	World Series	Reporter	ABC
1987–1992	College Football on ABC	Play-by-Play	ABC
1988–1991	Phoenix Cardinals	Play-by-Play	
1992–1994	NFL on TNT	Play-by-Play	TNT
1992–1995; 2004; 2009	NBA on TNT	Play-by-play	TNT
1992–2011	Phoenix Suns	Play-by-Play	FSN Arizona
2003–2005	College Football on ESPN	Play-by-Play	ESPN/ABC
2006	College Football on Versus	Play-by-Play	Versus

=== Radio ===
- 1970–1974: Green Bay Packers Play-by-play (radio)
- 1995–1998: St. Louis Rams Play-by-play (radio)
- 1999–2000: Chicago Bears Play-by-play (radio)

Media offices
Preceded by Brent Musburger	Play-by-Play announcer, NBA Finals; 1981	Succeeded by Dick Stockton
Preceded by Dick Enberg	Play-by-Play announcer, NCAA Men's Final Four; 1982–1984	Succeeded by Brent Musburger
Preceded by Keith Jackson	#2 play-by-play announcer, Major League Baseball on ABC; 1987–1988	Succeeded by Gary Thorne
