= List of The Replacements episodes =

The following is an episode list for the Disney Channel animated series The Replacements. The first episode aired on July 28, 2006, as a sneak preview, while the series originally started airing on September 8, 2006. The series ended in 2009 with a total of 52 episodes, as said by Dan Santat. While the majority of season one episodes consisted of two eleven-minute shorts, season two transitioned to having mostly half-hour episodes with a single plot. The series finale, "Irreplaceable", aired on March 30, 2009.

== Series overview ==
Season	Episodes	Originally released	
Season	Episodes	First released	Last released
1	21	July 28, 2006	October 29, 2007
2	31	March 10, 2008	March 30, 2009

== Episodes ==
=== Season 1 (2006–2007) ===
Note: All episodes in Season 1 were directed by Heather Martinez

No. overall	No. in season	Title	Written by	Storyboard by	Original release date	Prod. code
1	1	"Todd Strikes Out" "The Jerky Girls"	Devin Bunje & Nick Stanton Katherine Butler	Fred Gonzales Brandon Kruse	July 28, 2006	101
Todd and Riley decide to replace their old baseball coach with a new one that just happens to be a professional baseball player. However, their “new” baseball coach just acts too rough with them and their teammates. Riley replaces her strict scout leader with someone who will help them sell more jerky than their rival scout troop led by Sierra. Mindy Sterling guest-stars as Scoutleader Susan.
2	2	"CindeRiley" "Skate-Gate"	Devin Bunje & Nick Stanton	Bernie Petterson Broni Likomanov	September 8, 2006	104
To impress Johnny Hitswell, Riley replaces a one-cut hairdresser with one that will give her a complete makeover for the school dance. Todd replaces the mayor with a professional skater so he can be free to skateboard however he wants to. Riley, on the other hand, is having a sugar rush that makes her build a barn and catch chipmunks.
3	3	"The Insecurity Guard" "Quiet Riot"	Devin Bunje & Nick Stanton Tom Krajewski	Rudi Berden Fred Osmond	September 9, 2006	102
After being beaten up by a bully named Donny Rottweiler, Todd replaces the school's not-so-helpful security guard with a security robot that gives Todd a bad reputation. Todd replaces the librarian with a rock star at the same time their semester projects are due.
4	4	"The Truth Hurts" "Jumping Mad"	Devin Bunje & Nick Stanton Jack Thomas	Aldin Baroza Luke Cormican	September 16, 2006	103
Riley's school journalism career takes a turn when she replaces her teacher with someone who encourages her to embarrass her family and friends. Riley replaces her dad's stunt coordinator with a physics scientist in order to make his career safer.
5	5	"The Majestic Horse" "Carnie Dearest"	Devin Bunje & Nick Stanton Katherine Butler	Broni Likomanov Bernie Petterson	September 23, 2006	108
When Riley has always wanted a dream horse with talents like Thunderbolt. Dick buys Riley a mangy mule named Prince Cinnamon Boots from Sloan Stone who Riley replaces with the actual Thunderbolt. After being told not to, Todd sneaks out to the carnival, then joins them after he replaced the carnival manager with a street gambler. In this episode we learn that K joined the carnival when she was a kid and didn't want Todd and Riley to make the same mistake.
6	6	"Days of Blunder" "Cheer Pressure"	Devin Bunje & Nick Stanton Katherine Butler	Rudi Berden Aldin Baroza	September 30, 2006	107
Todd and Dick build a go-kart together for an upcoming race. When Dick is terrible at it, Todd has him temporarily replaced with an ace mechanic. To impress Johnny Hitswell, Riley replaces the school's cheerleading coach with a spiritual hippie after she, Tasumi, and Abbey don't make the team. In the end Riley does the right thing and all of the original cheerleaders are back on the team and all of the new cheerleaders are off the team.
7	7	"Going Overboard" "Riley's Birthday"	Kevin D. Campbell Jack Thomas	Fred Gonzales Aaron Rozenfeld	October 7, 2006	105
Todd and Riley replace their unfun babysitter with an educational TV show host, who has no respect for the Daring home. Agent K tries to get Riley's idol, Dustin Dreamlake, to come to her 13th birthday party while Dick and Todd buy her some time keeping the party guest happy. Earlier, Todd replaced a bus driver with an orangutan.
8	8	"Halloween Spirits"	Scott Peterson & Jack Thomas	Luke Cormican & Fred Osmond	October 14, 2006	106
When Riley and Todd learn that a call to Fleemco did not replace their neighbors the Kelpmans (voiced by Chip Chinery and Mary Elizabeth McGlynn), they fear that their neighbors had turned into zombies and plan to do the same to trick-or-treaters. Note: This is the first half-hour episode.
9	9	"German Squirmin'" "The Means Justify the Trend"	Devin Bunje & Nick Stanton Danielle Koenig	Dave Williams Fred Gonzales & Darren McGowan	November 4, 2006	110
Todd is failing German. To cover this up in order to go to the Fun-O-Sphere, Todd lies about his grade in German and replaces his German teacher with someone who only speaks German. Riley replaces cover girl and trend-setter Heather Hartley with an average girl, which happens to be herself.
10	10	"Davey Hunkerhoff" "Ratted Out"	Jonathan M. Howard Devin Bunje & Nick Stanton	Broni Likomanov Bernie Petterson	November 18, 2006	109
To impress Johnny Hitswell at the pool, Riley replaces the older pool lifeguard with a hunk (voiced by Zac Efron). Riley accidentally lets Todd's pet rat loose and replaces it with a new one.
11	11	"Master Pho" "Zoo or False?"	Jonathan M. Howard Cynthia True	Fred Gonzales Dave Williams	December 2, 2006	111
In order to help him take on Donny Rottweiler, Todd replaces his karate teacher with a professional who turns out to be one of Agent K's enemies. Tired of animals not getting respect at the zoo, Riley replaces the zookeeper Hiram Smeck with a nature activist who frees the animals. Now, Riley and her family must round them up.
12	12	"Best Friends For-Never?" "Running From Office"	Annie Sertich Jonathan M. Howard	Fred Osmond Luke Cormican	December 9, 2006	114
Riley and Tasumi resort to wrestling to solve their friendship issues after Todd replaces the guidance counselor with a professional wrestler. Todd and Riley run against each other in a school campaign, and spice things up when they each get candidate managers through Fleemco who are at odds with each other.
13	13	"Fieldtrippin'" "Fiddling Around"	Story by : Devin Bunje & Nick Stanton; Teleplay by : Tim Madison Katherine Butler	Luke Cormican Fred Osmond & Darin McGowan	January 6, 2007	112
Todd and Riley replace the uptight archaeology park owner with a treasure hunter who helps them discover a lost treasure. To be a country fiddler, Riley replaces her classical violin teacher with her idol, Susie May.
14	14	"Boyzroq!" "Ball Hogs"	Katherine Butler Devin Bunje & Nick Stanton	Fred Gonzales Dave Williams	February 3, 2007	117
To make some students like the school choir, Todd replaces his choir teacher with a music producer who turns the boys' choir into a band. Todd and Jacobo fight over a ball after ending up with a ball thrown by Carson Palmer at a football game. When Jacobo doesn't share the credit of catching the ball with him, Todd later replaced Jacobo's museum bouncer with a mime.
15	15	"iTodd" "See Dick Run"	Jonathan M. Howard Devin Bunje & Nick Stanton	Rudi Berden Aldin Baroza	June 16, 2007	119
Todd gets obsessed with a computer when Fleemster.com becomes a hit. When his family deactivates the computer as an intervention, Todd will try anyway to use the site even if it involves Fleemco replacing the I.T. guy at the library with Fleemster.com's creator. Todd enters his dad in a contest against Buzz's dad when he learns that he was a track champion. But Dick has to get in shape first. One of the steps involves replacing the owner of the local ice cream shop with a dietitian.
16	16	"The Perfect Date" "Serf's Up"	Katherine Butler Devin Bunje & Nick Stanton	Bernie Petterson Broni Likomanov	June 30, 2007	120
Johnny Hitswell asks Riley out on a date and her family tries to make her date perfect. To help, Todd (being forced by his parents) replaces the waitstaff at Le Petit Fromage with French waiters. But, when they can't show up, Todd and the rest of the family step in. Todd has a dream where he is a peasant and Riley is a cruel and spoiled princess who is soon to be crowned queen. To take her down, Todd gets a potion that replaces the drinker with a monstrous/champion version of that person.
17	17	"The Frog Prince" "Snow Place Like Nome"	Marty Isenberg Joel Bergen & Alex Muniz	Bernie Petterson Broni Likomanov	July 21, 2007	116
To prevent Shelton from being ridiculed for having an imaginary girlfriend, Riley replaces Shelton's imaginary girlfriend with a real one. Miley Cyrus guest-stars as Celebrity Star. When Principal Cutler won't shut down the school during a blizzard since he's an eskimo, Riley replaces Principal Cutler with a principal from Tobago who has never seen snow before.
18	18	"A Daring Romance" "Maid for K"	Katherine Butler	Aldin Baroza Rudi Berden	July 28, 2007	115
Riley replaces Uncle Phil due to his bad romance advice. He is replaced with Dick Daring's rival Gordo Glideright. The kids want K to take a break. To do that, they get a maid, via Fleemco.
19	19	"Abra K Dabra!" "Kumquat Day"	Marty Isenberg Devin Bunje & Nick Stanton	Aldin Baroza Rudi Berden	August 11, 2007	113
Todd and Riley each enter the school parent-child talent competition. But, after learning his mom has stage fright, Todd replaces her with Carlotta the Magician, who ends up being his mom in disguise. Riley's super-sappy love letter to Johnny Hitswell accidentally gets sent in the mail. To try to stop it, Riley replaces the Postal Worker with a sloth.
20	20	"London Calling"	Scott Peterson & Jack Thomas	Aldin Baroza; Rudi Berden; Fred Gonzales and Broni Likomanov	October 15, 2007	121
Todd and Riley go to London where their spy car, C.A.R.T.E.R was sent to teach children in a secret spy school. While there they uncover a sinister plot and with the help of their parents, C.A.R, and their grandparents, they manage to save the day. (guest stars Harry Potter star Bonnie Wright and Michael York as K's parents)
21	21	"Clue-Less" "Conrad's Day Off"	Devin Bunje & Nick Stanton Bart Jennett	Luke Cormican Fred Osmond	October 29, 2007	118
In this parody of Clue, Riley throws a mystery-themed party, but the lights flash off and someone stomps Todd's new extremely obnoxious Robo-Cat, so they interrogate each other to find out who pulverised the aggravating toy. When Todd replaces the math teacher with a rodeo clown with a bull, Conrad takes a temporary 48-hour vacation. Todd's replacement gets Mr. Vanderbausch angered with Riley and gives her double-detention. While Riley angers Mr. Vanderbausch more, Todd tries to bail her out without Conrad's help.

=== Season 2 (2008–2009) ===
Note: This season features characters based on actual celebrities in certain episodes. As of 2026, this season remains unavailable on Disney+ in general.

No. overall	No. in season	Title	Directed by	Written by	Storyboard by	Original release date	Prod. code
22	1	"The Spy That Wasn't Riley"	Heather Martinez	Devin Bunje & Nick Stanton	David Williams & Steven Lewis	March 10, 2008	201
An aptitude test reveals that Riley's job in the future is as window cleaner, so she tries to be a spy like her mom; Todd wants to become a clown.
23	2	"Late Night with Todd and Riley"	Heather Martinez	Devin Bunje & Nick Stanton	Stephen Lewis & Dave Williams	March 17, 2008	205
Riley and Todd have Sleepovers on the same night. Riley tries to get even with Sierra for not inviting her to her pool party, while Todd and his friends watch Splatter Train, a scary movie.
24	3	"Space Family Daring"	Heather Martinez	Jack Thomas	Aldin Baroza & Chris Otsuki	March 31, 2008	204
When Fleemco builds a Space Shuttle the Darings volunteer to test it. Meanwhile Riley tries to prove she can take risks.
25	4	"She Works Hard for the Movies"	Heather Martinez	Robin Shorr	Sam Bullock & Eric McConnell	April 14, 2008	203
Riley gets a job at a local drive-in movie theater; Todd and Jacobo devise a money-making scheme.
26	5	"Volcano Island"	Heather Martinez	Robin Shorr	Sam Bullock & Eric McConnell	April 28, 2008	207
The Daring family goes on a survival reality show. Meanwhile Todd gets sick of Buzz cheating during the game show so he replaces the host with someone who will stop Buzz from cheating.
27	6	"The Rizzle"	Heather Martinez	Jonathan M. Howard	Fred Reyes & Bernie Peterson	May 12, 2008	206
Riley gets in trouble when she hangs out with an older girl with a wild side; Todd realizes he needs to wear glasses, but he pretends that he doesn't need them.
28	7	"Campiest Episode Ever"	Heather Martinez	Jonathan Howard	Fred Reyes & Bernie Peterson	May 26, 2008	202
Todd is forced to go to camp, while Riley becomes a counselor. The Head Counselor doesn't care about paying attention to the kids, so he makes up a story about a monster to scare the kids so while the counselors are off having fun, the kids will stay in their cabin. But, Todd and his friends are focused on beating the rich kid camp at the talent show, so they try to catch the monster.
29	8	"Phoneless in Pleasant Hills"	Heather Martinez	Devin Bunje & Nick Stanton	Aldin Baroza & Chris Otsuki	June 9, 2008	208
Buzz uses Riley's phone to create replacements all over town. Meanwhile Todd is saddened when his favorite comedy team breaks up.
30	9	"Garage Sale Daring" "Private Todd"	Heather Martinez	Randi Barnes Taniya Hossain	Sam Bullock Eric McConnell	June 23, 2008	211
Riley scrambles to get rid of her childish things before Johnny arrives for a study-date. Todd gets sick of his mom giving him no space and so ends up with a spy proof room.
31	10	"Hollywoodn't"	Heather Martinez	Scott Peterson; Robin Shorr & Jack Thomas	Bernie Petterson & Fred Reyes	July 7, 2008	214
Todd lands a role in a movie based on Shelton and Celebrity's relationship in The Frog Prince. However, Todd discovers that Celebrity has a hidden agenda: revenge on Shelton for dumping her. Voice actress Jessica DiCicco guest stars as revenge-seeking superstar, Celebrity Starr, replacing Miley Cyrus. Special Guest Star: Josh Duhamel
32	11	"Glee by the Sea"	Heather Martinez	Spencer Walker	Carl Faruolo & Dave Williams	July 21, 2008	213
The Darings go on vacation at a beach where Todd falls for an older girl, and Riley waits for Johnny Hitswell to call. K thinks Dr. Skorpius is up to something.
33	12	"Bowled Over" "A Little Tiff"	Heather Martinez	David Ihlenfeld & David Wright Robin Shorr	Eric McConnell Calvin Suggs	August 11, 2008	215
When Abbey refuses Riley's help in a beauty pageant, Riley decides to enter herself. When Todd finds out Tiffany has a crush on him, he's not interested until he realizes the benefits of a rich girlfriend.
34	13	"Canadian Fakin'"	Heather Martinez	Jonathan M. Howard	Chris Otsuki & Aldin Baroza	August 25, 2008	216
Riley goes to Canada as part of a foreign exchange program while the Darings host a Canadian boy who makes Todd so jealous that he runs away from home.
35	14	"Tasumi Unmasked"	Heather Martinez	Jonathan M. Howard	Dave Williams & Steven Lewis	September 15, 2008	209
Riley tries to uncover the truth about Tasumi, and finds that she has a secret identity to escape from her stardom in Japan. Meanwhile, Todd is confronted by a street performer over his one-man-band show.
36	15	"Pleasant Hills Confidential"	Heather Martinez	Scott Peterson	Bernie Petterson & Fred Reyes	September 29, 2008	210
Todd starts selling replacements to his classmates.
37	16	"Extra Credit"	Robb Pratt	Taniya Hossanin & Jack Thomas	Calvin Suggs & Eric McConnell	October 13, 2008	219
Riley desperately needs money when she runs up charges on K's credit card. Meanwhile, Todd finds another money-making scheme when he meets someone selling term papers.
38	17	"You Got Schooled"	Heather Martinez	Devin Bunje & Nick Stanton	Dave Williams & Carl Faruolo	October 27, 2008	217
Dick ends up in Todd's history class when he is sent back to pass 6th grade history. Meanwhile, Riley and Johnny compete against bullies from two towns over when they take over the local skating rink.
39	18	"Heartbreak in the City"	Robb Pratt	Taniya Hossain	Bernie Petterson & Fred Reyes	November 10, 2008	222
Riley gets paranoid when Johnny goes to New York City to model which results in him dumping her. Todd and Dick decide to live like "dudes" when the mother and daughter are out of the house. Special Guest Star: Tim Gunn
40	19	"Puzzle Me Daring"	Heather Martinez	Scott Peterson	Bernie Petterson & Fred Reyes	November 17, 2008	218
Todd tries to help his mom solve a case that involves riddles left by a crook. Riley discovers that she can make boys do what she wants by acting like someone else.
41	20	"Dick Daring's All-Star Holiday Stunt Spectacular"	Heather Martinez	Devin Bunje; Taniya Hossain; Jonathan M. Howard; Scott Peterson; Robin Shorr; Nick Stanton & Jack Thomas	Aldin Baroza; Chris Otsuki; Carl Faruolo & Dave Williams	December 8, 2008	212
The Darings host their annual holiday show directed by Riley with Ed Begley, Jr., Carson Palmer, and Josh Duhamel. Meanwhile, Todd tries to make some money with his own telethon.
42	21	"A Buzzwork Orange"	Robb Pratt	Jonathan M. Howard	Chris Otsuki & Aldin Baroza	December 22, 2008	220
Todd accidentally sends Buzz to reform school. Meanwhile, Agent K and Dick swap bodies in this episode. Special Guest Star: Gilbert Gottfried
43	22	"Double Trouble" "The Revenge of Prince Cinnamon Boots"	Robb Pratt	Robin Shorr Scott Peterson	Eric McConnell Fred Gonzales	January 5, 2009	223
Riley, Tasumi, and Abbey join Nature Tweens, after Riley claims she is over her breakup with Johnny. Riley then goes to a tween speed-dating service, where she decides she is going to go to the Nature Tweens awards banquet with Berry, after finding out that Johnny is also taking someone to the banquet. Tired of being ignored by the Darings, Prince Cinnamon Boots lures them out of the house, and then locks them out using the security system K installed on the house.
44	23	"Moustache Mayhem"	Robb Pratt	Devin Bunje & Nick Stanton	Dave Williams & Carl Faruolo	January 26, 2009	221
Everyone assumes Todd is an adult when one of K's gadgets makes him sprout a moustache.
45	24	"Snide and Prejudice"	Robb Pratt	Taniya Hossain	Chris Otsuki & Aldin Baroza	February 2, 2009	224
Riley instantly dislikes a new kid in town, but she soon develops a crush on him. Meanwhile, Todd considers himself too cool to play a nerdy game with Jacobo.
46	25	"Art Attack"	Robb Pratt	Devin Bunje & Nick Stanton	Dave Williams & Carl Faruolo	February 23, 2009	225
Todd and Riley enroll in an art class, but Riley soon becomes jealous when Todd becomes a favorite in the art community.
47	26	"Shelton's Bar Mitzvah" "Crushing Riley"	Robb Pratt	Robin Shorr Scott Tobis	Fred Reyes Bernie Petterson	March 2, 2009	226
Shelton's parents exclude him from planning his own bar mitzvah. Riley tutors a bully who then falls for her.
48	27	"Injustice is Blind"	Robb Pratt	Jonathan M. Howard	Eric McConnell & Fred Gonzales	March 9, 2009	227
While Todd takes on a blind bully, Riley confronts the author of her favorite book series for not ending it the way she wants it to end.
49	28	"Truth or Daring"	Robb Pratt	Robin Shorr	Aldin Baroza & Chris Otsuki	March 16, 2009	228
When Todd is tired of Riley's truth telling, he gives her truth salt that forces her to tell the truth all the time. That's a bad idea when Dick is trying to get reelected for mayor. Meanwhile, Todd gives himself lie spice to make his lies 50% more believable, but too much consumption of the spice causes Todd to lie uncontrollably. Which is also a bad idea when Todd's uncontrollable lying gets him sent to the Corps.
50	29	"Todd Busters"	Robb Pratt	Devin Bunje & Nick Stanton	Carl Faruolo & Dave Williams	March 23, 2009	229
After embarrassing himself in front of the whole school, Todd uses K's invisibility hat to prank the entire school by posing as a ghost; which gets him into more embarrassment and forcing to clean up his mess.
51	30	"R2: A Tale of Two Rileys"	Robb Pratt	Scott Peterson & Robin Shorr	Fred Gonzales & Fred Reyes	March 30, 2009	230
Riley is so desperate to see Dreamfest, a festival where Dustin Dreamlake is coming to, that she blackmails Conrad to send her a robot to take her place in school the day of the festival.
52	31	"Irreplaceable"	Robb Pratt	Jonathan M. Howard & Jack Thomas	Dave Williams; Aldin Baroza & Fred Reyes	March 30, 2009	231
Todd and Riley come home early from school to find out that their parents have been replaced with two "perfect" parents. Todd and Riley think Conrad is out to get them, so they go with Tasumi, Shelton, Jacobo, and C.A.R. to Fleemco Headquarters to find out why. They soon find out that Doctor Skorpius has kidnapped Dick, K and Conrad and has taken over the company. They defeat Doctor Skorpius and Todd finds out that Conrad is really their uncle. In the end, Riley and Todd start helping to run the business. Note: This is the series finale.
