= Nikki Levy =

American film executive and television host

Nikki Levy is an American film executive and television host. She is the creator, producer, and host of the Los Angeles based comedy show Don't Tell My Mother, a show where writers and performers in the film and television industry tell stories they would never want their mothers to hear. She also serves as Vice President at Fox's Wedge Works World Wide.

== Early life ==
Levy grew up in New York. She graduated from Northwestern University with a BS in radio, TV, and film and a certificate from the creative writing for the media program.

== Career ==
Levy started her career with a producing job for the Oxygen Network. In 2002 she moved to Los Angeles. She assisted Alison Greenspan at Di Novi Pictures. She then got her first executive job at Gold Circle Films. From there, she was hired as Director of Development at Imagine. She now works at Wedge Works developing films such as the summer 2013 Epic.

After working at Fox, Levy launched the comedy show Don't Tell My Mother in October 2011, and acts as the show's producer.
