= Mary Birdsong =

American actress

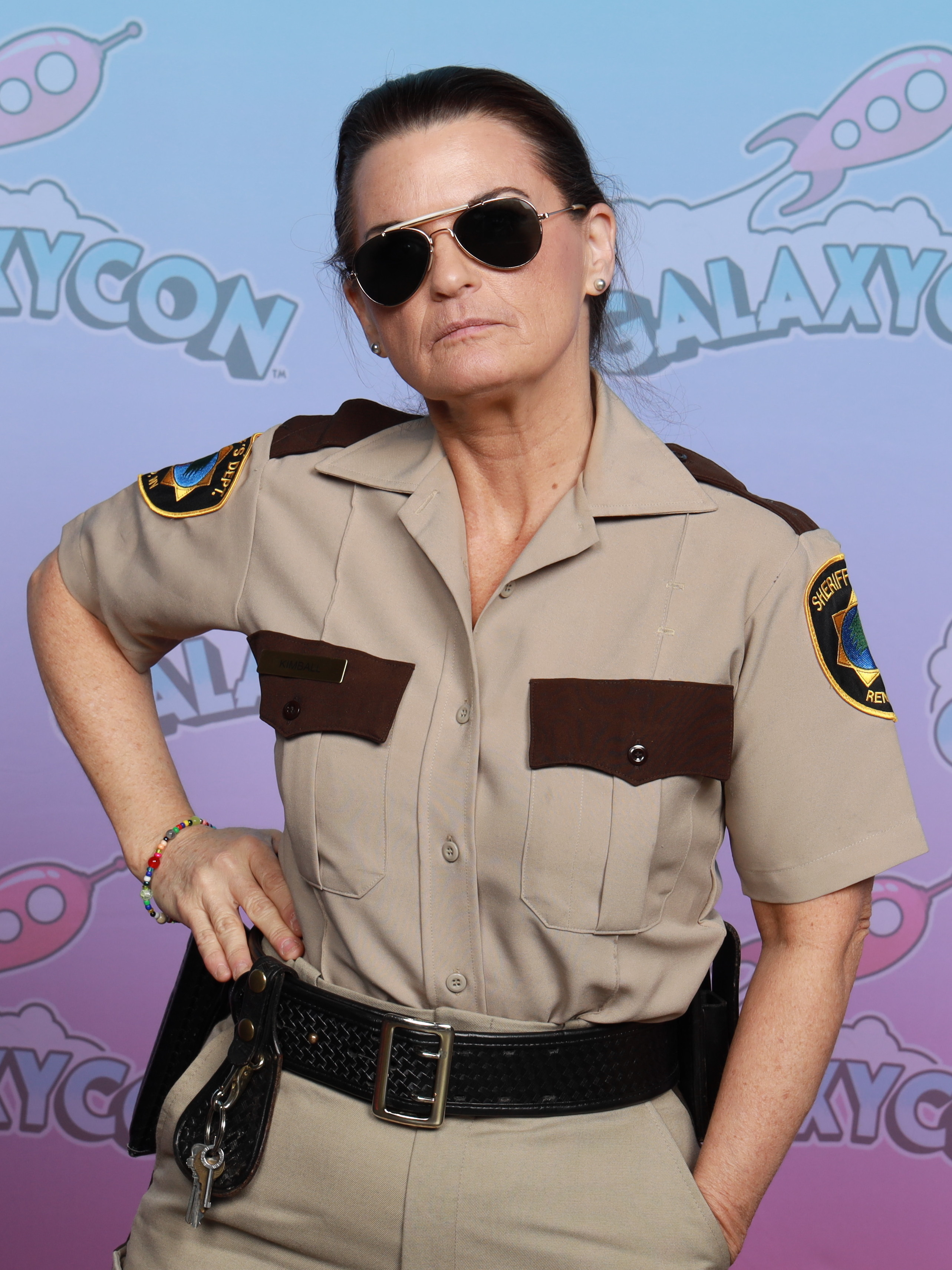
- Birdsong at GalaxyCon Richmond in 2025
- Education: New York University (BFA)
- Occupations: Actress; comedian; writer; singer; puppeteer
- Years active: 1996–present

Mary Birdsong is an American actress, comedian, writer, and singer. In addition to her work in theater and voice acting, she was a regular cast member on Reno 911! and appeared in the HBO series Succession.

== Early life ==
Birdsong grew up on Long Beach Island, New Jersey, leaving there when she was 18. The daughter of Katherine Kimball Birdsong, she worked at several jobs, including the Showplace Ice Cream Parlor at the Surflight Theatre in Beach Haven. Doing improv comedy there provided preparation for her future career. She graduated from Southern Regional High School in 1986 and earned a bachelor of fine arts degree in acting from New York University's Tisch School of the Arts.

== Career ==
=== Film and television ===
Birdsong made her on-screen debut in the 1996 TV film Live On Tape. She is best known as Deputy Cherisha Kimball on the comedy series Reno 911! (2005–2007, 2020–2022) and its two spin-off movies in 2007 and 2021. She is also known for playing Nancy McDonald in Rob Zombie's Halloween II and Kai Mitchell opposite George Clooney in the Alexander Payne film The Descendants. She appeared alongside Adrien Brody in the stoner comedy High School (2010), playing Mrs. Gordon, a high school dean's promiscuous wife. She has also made numerous cameos on film and television, including in the major productions Made of Honor and Percy Jackson: Sea of Monsters, and the psychological thriller Buried. She is a former correspondent on The Daily Show and Crossballs.

As a voice actress, she has appeared in animated series such as Goldie and Bear, Stroker and Hoop, Little Bill (as Dorado's mom in the episode "New Foods"), Harvey Birdman: Attorney At Law, Tak & the Power of Juju, T.U.F.F. Puppy and Stroker and Hoop, as well as the video game Grand Theft Auto: Vice City and Command & Conquer 4: Tiberian Twilight, and animated film Beavis and Butt-Head Do the Universe.

Birdsong appeared in season 1 (2018) and season 4 (2023) of the HBO series Succession. She played Marianne Hirsch, the mother of fan favorite Greg Hirsch (played by Nicolas Braun), and niece of family patriarch Logan Roy (Brian Cox).

=== Broadway and live theater ===
From July 2006 to January 2007, Birdsong performed in the Martin Short: Fame Becomes Me comedy musical, alongside Martin Short, Marc Shaiman, Nicole Parker, Brooks Ashmanskas, and Capathia Jenkins, winning a Theatre World Award for her performance. On January 29, 2008, Birdsong joined the Broadway cast of the musical, Hairspray. She played the role of Velma Von Tussle, the bigoted, pushy stage mother and television producer. Birdsong left the production on April 6, 2008. She then performed her one-woman show 3 Days in the Tub: A Mama Drama in Los Angeles at Comedy Central Stage (September 2010) & the Fake Gallery (November 2010), and in New York City at Joe's Pub (January 2011). before going to San Francisco to play Mona Ramsey in ACT's adaptation of Armistead Maupin's Tales of the City. She is also known for her Judy Garland impression.

Together with author Justin Halpern (Shit My Dad Says) and comic Jen Kober (American Reunion), Birdsong performed as a member of the May 2012 cast of Don't Tell My Mother!, an LA-based comedy showcase.

== Filmography ==
=== Film ===
Year	Title	Role	Notes
1996	Live on Tape	Various	Television film
1998	Above Freezing	Esther	
1999	Let It Snow	Sneakered Businesswoman	
1999	Zoey's Zoo	Mom	Television film
2003	Replay	Nicola	
2005	Pizza	Siobhan	
2006	Le Chase	Mary Long	Short film
2006	The Last Request	Marlene	
2006	Beer League	Rhonda	Also known as Artie Lange's Beer League
2007	Reno 911!: Miami	Deputy Cherisha Kimball	
2008	Made of Honor	Sharon at Bridal Shower	
2009	Adventureland	Francy	
2009	Halloween II	Nancy McDonald	
2010	Buried	411 Female Operator (voice)	Credited as Mary Songbird
2010	High School	Mrs. Gordon	
2010	Killers	Jackie Vallero	
2010	It's Kind of a Funny Story	Bobby's Ex	
2011	The Descendants	Kai Mitchell	
2011	Angry White Man	Maxine	
2013	Where Does It Go from Here	Mom	Short film
2013	Percy Jackson: Sea of Monsters	Gray Sister Wasp	
2014	Manager	Barbra	Short film
2014	Lucky Stiff	Maid	
2015	Park City	Ticket Girl	
2015	Staten Island Summer	Bianca Manicucci	
2015	Freeheld	Carol Andree	
2015	Kids vs Monsters	Maxine	
2017	A Happening of Monumental Proportions	Melissa Brickman	
2019	Stormchaser	Bonnie Blue	Short film
2020	I Hate the Man in My Basement	Lita Bronze	
2020	Flip the Switch	Bonnie Blue	Short film
2020	American Reject	Miriam	
2021	Reno 911!: The Hunt for QAnon	Deputy Cherisha Kimball	Television film Also producer
2022	Beavis and Butt-Head Do the Universe	Reporter (voice)	
2022	Reno 911!: It's a Wonderful Heist	Deputy Cherisha Kimball	Television film Also producer
TBA	Lincoln in the Bardo †		In production

=== Television ===
Year	Title	Role	Notes
1999	Oh Yeah! Cartoons	Mom (voice)	Episode: "ChalkZone: Rapunzel / Zoey's Zoo: Lots of Ocelots / My Neighbor Was a Teenage Robot"
2000	Talk to Me	Meredith	Episode: "About Taking It Like a Man"
2000–2001	Welcome to New York	Connie	Main role; 14 episodes
2002	Late Friday	Janet Lamé	Episode: "#2.6"
2003	Little Bill	Valencia (voice)	Episode: "New Foods / Elephant Tricks"
2003	Ed	Lisa Barnes	Episode: "Business as Usual"
2004–2022	Reno 911!	Lisa the Masseuse	Episode: "British Law"
2004–2022	Reno 911!	Deputy Cherisha Kimball	Main role (season 3–5; 7–8); 75 episodes
2004	Whoopi's Littleburg	Mrs. Peg Piggie	Main role
2004	Crossballs: The Debate Show	Various characters	Recurring role; 15 episodes Also writer
2005	Harvey Birdman, Attorney at Law	Chibo / Tana (voice)	Episode: "Beyond the Valley of the Dinosaurs"
2005	Stroker & Hoop	Keith / various characters (voice)	Recurring role; 8 episodes
2007	Tak and the Power of Juju	Killjoy Juju (voice)	Episode: "The Three Chiefs / The Party"
2010	Svetlana	Madeline	Episode: "Throw Mama Back on the Plane"
2010	T.U.F.F. Puppy	Snowflake (voice)	Episode: "Chilly Dog / The Doomies"
2011	Mad Love	Kelly	Episode: "Baby, You Can Drive My Car"
2011	Shake It Up	Squitza Hessenheffer	Episode: "Vatalihootsit It Up"
2012	Sherman's in Sanity	Virginia Wahlroos Pfinger	2 episodes
2012–2016	The Middle	Marlene Ludlow	3 episodes
2012–2013	Raising Hope	Mayor Suzie Hellmann	2 episodes
2012	Perception	Cheryl Corvis	Episode: "Lovesick"
2012–2014	Crash & Bernstein	Mel Bernstein	Recurring role; 22 episodes
2013	Ben and Kate	Deanne	Episode: "Gone Fishin'"
2014	The Neighbors	Justine	Episode: "Oscar Party"
2014	The Knick	Fionnula Sears	Episode: "Get the Rope"
2014	Franklin & Bash	Erica Boyd	Episode: "Falcon's Nest"
2015	Olive and Mocha	Liz Dimpfle	Episode: "Rock n' Roll"
2015	Review	Shampoo	Episode: "Curing Homosexuality, Mile High Club"
2015–2018	Goldie & Bear	Mama Bear (voice)	Recurring role; 11 episodes
2016	Lady Dynamite	Jean Bart	Episode: "Bisexual Because of Meth"
2016	Nicky, Ricky, Dicky & Dawn	Mrs. Gressle	Episode: "The Tell-Tale Art"
2016	Masters of Sex	Maude Raines	Episode: "Freefall"
2016	Loosely Exactly Nicole	Madison	Episode: "Green Card"
2016	Scream Queens	Penelope Hotchkiss	Episode: "Channel Pour Homme-icide"
2017	Ryan Hansen Solves Crimes on Television	Dorothy Montclair	Episode: "Hungry for Justice"
2018; 2023	Succession	Marianne Hirsch	3 episodes
2021	Tell Me Your Secrets	Jane Tyler	Episode: "I'm a Good Person"
2021	Generation	Mrs. Culpepper	Recurring role; 4 episodes
2022–2026	Beavis and Butt-Head	Various characters (voice)	7 episodes
2023	The Last Thing He Told Me	Elenor McGovern	2 episodes
2025	Electric Bloom	Ingrid	Episode: "How We Tried to Crash a Party"

=== Awards and nominations ===
Year	Award	Category	Nominated work	Result
2011	Gotham Awards	Best Ensemble Performance (shared with the cast)	The Descendants	Nominated
2020	Idyllwild International Festival of Cinema	Best Actress Featurette	Stormchaser	Nominated
2022	Primetime Emmy Awards	Outstanding Television Movie	Reno 911!: The Hunt for QAnon	Nominated
