= Amy Bender =

American sports reporter and producer (born 1965)

- Born: Amy Elizabeth Bombard; September 15, 1965 (age 60); Kansas City, Missouri, U.S.
- Occupations: Reporter, producer
- Spouse: Trey Stephen Bender (m. 1995)
- Children: Landry Bender
- Relatives: Gary Bender (father-in-law)

Amy Elizabeth Bender (née Bombard) (born September 15, 1965) is a sports reporter and producer. Her husband Trey Bender is also a sportscaster.

== Biography ==
Bender was born Amy Elizabeth Bombard on September 15, 1965, in Kansas City, Missouri to parents Richard Irvin Bombard (1933–2019), a commercial aircraft pilot and former Drill instructor for the United States Marine Corps (USMC) and Barbara Suzanne Hogan. She has two brothers named Matthew and Adam.

In 1975, Bender and her family moved to Utah. Bender then attended Bountiful High School in Bountiful, Utah, and graduated in 1983.

Bender grew up as a fan of the Kansas City Royals where she was a huge fan of George Brett and she learned how to do his batting average when she was in third grade. Amy hails a family of sportscasters; Gary and Trey. Unlike Gary and Trey whom they graduated from the University of Kansas, Amy graduated from the University of Utah, where she went to work in the sports information office. She was also the host of Countdown to London, a show on the Universal Sports Network.

Bender formerly hosted college cheerleading championships on ESPN and ESPN2. She is currently hosting The Cheerleading Worlds on ESPN & ESPN2 with Amanda Borden.

Bender has worked in the markets of Salt Lake City, Phoenix (like Gary and Trey), and Chicago and does play-by-play and sideline reporting for FSN West. Amy was sports anchor for KPHO-TV, a CBS affiliate in Phoenix as well as a sports producer. She also hosted Sportspage where celebrities made their way onto the set. She served as a producer for the Utah Jazz Radio Network and also worked in the media and public relations department.

== Personal life ==
Amy married sportscaster Trey Bender in 1995. Together they have one daughter, actress Landry Bender.
