= The Replacements (TV series) =

American animated television series

- Genre: Animated comedy; Action; Adventure; Slapstick; Science fiction
- Created by: Dan Santat
- Directed by: Heather Martinez (2006–07); Robb Pratt (2008–09)
- Voices of: Nancy Cartwright; Grey DeLisle; Kath Soucie; Daran Norris; David McCallum; Jeff Bennett
- Theme music composer: Darian Sahanaja
- Composers: Darian Sahanaja; Jason Frederick
- Country of origin: United States
- Original language: English
- No. of seasons: 2
- No. of episodes: 52 (list of episodes)

Production
- Executive producer: Jack Thomas
- Running time: 22 minutes
- Production company: Walt Disney Television Animation

Original release
- Network: Disney Channel
- Release: July 28, 2006 – March 30, 2009

The Replacements is an American animated television series that aired on Disney Channel from July 28, 2006, to March 30, 2009. 52 episodes of two seasons were produced.

== Premise ==
The opening sequence explains that two siblings, Todd and Riley, lived in what used to be an orphanage with their birth parents' fate unrevealed. While cleaning the floors, they stumbled across a Fleemco comic book containing an ad for the Fleemco phone. They mail-ordered the ad and $1.98 for the phone—which allows them to replace any person or animal they desire—and in the process they got new adoptive parents: a British secret agent named Agent K and a professional daredevil named Dick Daring. Whenever Todd and Riley want to replace someone undesirable, they call Conrad Fleem on the Fleemco phone via a large button. Fleemco immediately replaces the person with someone whom the siblings prefer. The series follows their misadventures as they attempt to better their lives by replacing unwanted people, with said attempt usually backfiring and both learning a lesson about appreciating what they already have.

== Episodes ==
Season	Episodes	Originally released	
Season	Episodes	First released	Last released
1	21	July 28, 2006	October 29, 2007
2	31	March 10, 2008	March 30, 2009

== Characters ==
=== Main ===
Title card of The Replacements featuring the show's main characters. From left to right: C.A.R., Dick, Riley, Agent K, and Todd

- Todd Bartholomew Daring (voiced by Nancy Cartwright) is Riley's 11-year-old younger brother. Todd is the lazy, troublemaking, and selfish one of the siblings. He and Riley are the adoptive children of Agent K and Dick Daring. Todd usually uses the Fleemco phone to replace people for selfish purposes. He is best friends with Jacobo and Shelton. Todd loves the Monkey Cop film series and playing the GameCone (a parody of Nintendo GameCube) video game console. He also loves playing games with Jacobo, Shelton, Buzz, Donny, Zephremiah, and Silent Joe. He dislikes school, learning, and reading, which forces him to replace the librarian in one episode.
- Riley Eugene Daring (voiced by Grey DeLisle) is Todd's 13-year-old older sister. She is the kinder, more caring, and reliable sibling who enjoys school. She generally uses the Fleemco phone to help others or to replace unfair adults who do not take her seriously. She enjoys horses and equestrianism, Hornet Hive Scouts (a Girl Scout-type of youth group), and any form of sugar. She loves playing games with Tasumi, Abbey, and Sierra. She has a crush on Johnny Hitswell, and they became a couple in the second season, but Johnny breaks up with her because of her jealousy.
- Karen "Agent K" Daring (voiced by Kath Soucie) resembles Emma Peel. She is the siblings' adoptive British mother and a spy. From an outside view, it seems she does not care for her kids nor husband, but in fact, she loves them devotedly, even though she may express it through a recording or videotape. If something seems unfair, she fixes it very quickly. As a downside of her career as a spy, Agent K is prone to paranoia and can be quite strict (particularly towards Todd). Karen's mother is also a secret agent.
- Richard Marion "Dick" Daring (voiced by Daran Norris) is the siblings' adoptive father and the world's greatest daredevil. Dick's appearance resembles that of Evel Knievel. He, like Todd, is not very smart, and is also very immature, as he owns a teddy bear known as "Evel Bearnievel". He thinks that C.A.R. is his best friend, though C.A.R. does not see it that way.
- C.A.R.T.E.R. (also known as C.A.R.) (voiced by David McCallum) is the high-tech family car with a British accent. He can do just about anything but is not always prepared to do something for the family, especially not for Dick. He never lets Dick drive him (presumably under the assumption that Dick's daredevil habits would wreck him) and scares Dick using "The Oslo Option", which consists of C.A.R. pulling out a spinning buzzsaw from his hood.
- Conrad Fleem (voiced by Jeff Bennett) is the mysterious owner of the Canton, Ohio-based Fleemco company. He processes Todd and Riley's requests whenever they call him. His face is never shown until the series finale "Irreplaceable," where he is revealed to be Todd and Riley's uncle.

=== Supporting ===
- Tasumi (voiced by Lauren Tom) is Riley's Japanese-American best friend, who has a crush on Jacobo, as revealed in one episode when she kissed him. In the episode "Tasumi Unmasked", it is revealed that Tasumi is a Japanese pop star who moved to Pleasant Hills from her native country, in order to escape the constant adoration of her fans and live a peaceful life, as Pleasant Hills was voted as the least culturally aware town in the world and she believed that no one would recognize her.
- Abbey Willson (voiced by Erica Hubbard in season 1 and Tempestt Bledsoe in season 2) is Riley's African-American best friend. Even though she hates the popular girls such as Sierra, she is seen wanting to be a part of them so bad, and habitually tells Sierra she is cool, even though she does not mean to. She has a younger sister named Tiffany who dated Todd in the episode "A Little Tiff".
- Jacobo Jacobo (voiced by Candi Milo) is Todd's Mexican-American best friend. Jacobo loves mystery books and has a secret talent for singing. He has a crush on Agent K and is always trying to win her affections, even in the last episode "Irreplaceable," when he begins to date Tasumi.
- Shelton Gunnar Klutzberry (voiced by Jeff Bennett impersonating Jerry Lewis) is Todd's Eastern European-American friend and a stereotypical nerd. He is afraid of girls, and once had a relationship with Celebrity Starr. He also has an imaginary girlfriend named Zelda (since an imaginary girlfriend is all that he can handle). He often thinks of himself as cool and calls the others nerds. He becomes very muscular and handsome when he takes his glasses off, but this is not to his advantage because he cannot use contacts, and has to have heavy glasses (which causes him to appear weak and scrawny).
- Buzz Winters (voiced by Grey DeLisle) is a wannabe bully and is Todd's nemesis. He usually makes silly jokes then laughs at them. Although he is normally a bully in some episodes they have put their differences aside and even become friends. Deep down Buzz is jealous of Todd and Riley because their father is cooler than his is, as Buzz's father used to be the coolest in the neighborhood until Todd and Riley came along.
- Donny Rottweiler (voiced by Jess Harnell) is a professional bully who is much taller than Todd, but still attends his school. He is Buzz's mentor and Todd's other nemesis, feared because of his giant size.
- Johnny Hitswell (voiced by Dee Bradley Baker) is the subject of Riley's affection and her middle school sweetheart. Even though every girl in the school is all over him, he tends to always ignore them, except for his annual Kumquat Day card readings. He enjoys basketball and baseball, and plays on the same baseball team as Todd and Riley.
- Sierra McCool (voiced by Tara Strong) is the popular girl at school, and is Riley's nemesis. She is constantly competing with Riley for the affections of Johnny Hitswell. In the second season, when Riley and Johnny become a couple, her crush on him persists, and her aim becomes to break them up so she can be Johnny's girlfriend. She has her own posse (Jennifer and Claudia) and a huge, conceited ego.
- Principal Cutler (voiced by Jeff Bennett) is the Alaskan Native principal of George Stapler Middle School. Since he is originally from Alaska, he allows school on major snow days until Todd and Riley changed it one time. He is also very cheap and cares about money over the students, the school, and the faculty.
- Prince Cinnamon Boots (voiced by Daran Norris) is the Daring Family's pet mule. He was originally given to Riley by her father when she asked for a show horse.
- Shelly Klutzberry (voiced by Candi Milo) is Shelton's older sister.
- Jennifer (voiced by Lauren Tom) and Claudia (voiced by Erica Hubbard/Tempestt Bledsoe) are two blonde-haired twin girls who are usually seen with Sierra McCool.

=== Recurring ===
- Phil Mygrave (voiced by Rob Paulsen) is Dick's stunt coordinator and brother and Riley and Todd's uncle. He is not very good with measurements, as he does not use proper units of measurements, rather just "tweaking the thingy on the whatchimacallit a smidge". He has also been married several times, and has poor advice for maintaining a relationship.
- Agent B (voiced by Carolyn Seymour) is Agent K's mother and Todd and Riley's grandmother. She is the headmistress of the Royal Academy of Spies. She seems to not get along with K before the episode "London Calling", but in the episode they reconcile and B becomes a loving grandmother to Riley and Todd.
- Agent G (voiced by Michael York) is Agent K's father and Todd and Riley's grandfather. He is the chief inventor of the Royal Academy of Spies.
- Gordo Glideright (voiced by Bruce Campbell) is Dick's stunt rival. He is always trying to steal Dick's stunt secrets.
- Dustin Dreamlake (voiced by Jason Marsden) is a parody of pop star Justin Timberlake and Riley's idol.
- Ace Palmero (voiced by Dee Bradley Baker) – A news reporter who refers to himself as "I, Ace Palmero". A recurring gag involves only his profile being shown on TV, with the camera changing whenever he turns to face it.
- Dr. Hans Herkmer (voiced by Jeff Bennett) is a scientist who works for the space program.
- Amanda McMurphy (voiced by Candi Milo) is a hard-hitting investigator reporter who helped Riley with the school newspaper.
- Fabian Le'Tool (voiced by Rob Paulsen) is a professional hairstylist.
- Davey Hunkerhoff (voiced by Zac Efron) is a handsome lifeguard and parody of David Hasselhoff who Riley used to make Johnny Hitswell jealous in the episode "Davey Hunkerhoff".
- Skye Blossoms (voiced by Tara Strong) is a prevalent replacement. A hippie who refuses to judge people and believes the answers to all of your questions are "what you feel the answer is."
- Mr. Vanderbosh (voiced by Rob Paulsen) is Riley's stern teacher.
- The Kelpmans (voiced by Chip Chinery and Mary Elizabeth McGlynn) are next-door neighbors to the Darings. They were once replaced on Halloween by the Zupecks.
- Lady Lady (voiced by Grey DeLisle) is a professional wrestler who settled Tasumi and Riley's feud for Todd in "Best Friends For-Never?". Lady also appears as one of Dr. Scorpius' minions in "Irreplaceable".
- Wrestler Announcer (voiced by Jim Cummings) announces the wrestling matches since Riley and Tasumi's end-of-friendship argument in "Best friends For-Never". He announced Lady Lady's Marriage to Canadian Knucklehead in "Serf's Up".
- Celebrity Starr (voiced by Miley Cyrus in the first season and Jessica DiCicco in the second season) – This famous teen was first found replacing Shelton's imaginary girlfriend, Zelda because Shelton had defended Riley when Sierra put a love note in Riley's locker saying it was from Shelton. Riley felt poor and had Zelda replaced with Celebrity who liked nearsighted nerds. In the end, Todd turned her plan around and protected his friend. Celebrity also appears as one of Scorpius' minions in "Irreplaceable".
- Zephremiah and Silent Joe (both voiced by Dee Bradley Baker) are twins who are friends of Todd's. They were both in Todd's boy choir. Zephremiah apparently likes sports. His twin brother, Silent Joe, is apparently sensitive and rarely talks.
- Splatter Train is a fictional character in a recurring scary movie throughout the series.
- Tiny Evil (voiced by Jason Marsden) – An enemy of Agent K.
- Doctor Skorpius (voiced by Dave Wittenberg) – Archenemy of Agent K and the main antagonist of the series. He has a scorpion tail-shaped beard and is usually seen trying to take over the world in some way.
- Goober (voiced by Dee Bradley Baker) and T-Bone (voiced by Jess Harnell) are radio DJs whom Todd idolizes.
- Buck Spikes (voiced by John DiMaggio) is a tough baseball coach who replaced Todd and Riley's old coach, Pops. Spikes keeps pushing kids to the limit, and when they strike out, he cruelly throws them into a cage. Spikes also appears as one of Doctor Scorpius's minions in "Irreplaceable."
- 'Puter Dude 13 (voiced by Jeff Bennett) is a "cool and mysterious recluse" who runs the online interactive game Fleemster. He is secretly a nerd.
- Heather Hartley is the "Her Girl" for Teen Swoon Magazine. She has an outrageous hairstyle and usually carries around her pet turtle on a leash.
- Petrov (voiced by Dee Bradley Baker) is an enemy of Agent K.
- Dr. Clonemaster is a rival of Agent K. He was seen only in the episode, "The Means Justify the Trend", in a flashback.
- Dingo McGee (voiced by Jeff Bennett and Carlos Alazraqui) is the replacement sent by Fleemco when Todd got sick of an archaeologist treating them like babies on a field trip in the episode "Field Trippin'". He's an adventurous, usually reckless, explorer who plays the didgeridoo.
- Robo Fleem SGX (voiced by Diedrich Bader) is a giant security robot that replaced the incompetent security guard at Todd's school in "The Insecurity Guard". However, the robot later went crazy and tried to destroy Riley when she tried to return it to Fleemco. In the last episode "Irreplaceable", Dr. Scorpius creates a second Robo Fleem SGX to destroy Todd's friends.
- Mrs. Shusher (voiced by Tara Strong) is the shush-happy librarian at George Stapler Middle School. Todd got sick of her forcing everyone to be quiet, and later replaced her with a librarian who was the complete opposite of her. She returned later in the episode when her replacement was returned by Todd and Riley.
- Gammazor, Mecha-Gammazor, and Grammazor – All rumored enemies of Tasumi. There are pictures of them on her "list" whenever she brings it out and threatens to put Riley on it.
- Garth (voiced by Dee Bradley Baker) is a school janitor who is constantly being replaced by Todd and Riley when they need a quick replacement. Garth is not very enthusiastic about his job and is fully lazy. Garth also appears as one of Doctor Scorpius's minions in "Irreplaceable."
- Mrs. Fragile (voiced by Kath Soucie) is a replacement who is very emotionally fragile, anxious and very easy to upset.

== Broadcast ==
The series ran originally from July 28, 2006 to March 30, 2009, on Disney Channel in the United States. Although the series originally aired episodes on Saturdays at 8:00pm EST, it was moved to Mondays at 5:00pm EST. The series aired for the last time on August 27, 2011, after being aired for the last time on ABC Kids prior to its cancellation. It also aired on Toon Disney (later rebranded Disney XD).

Internationally, The Replacements was shown on Disney Channel UK & Ireland, Family Channel (Canada), Disney Channel Spain, and Disney Channel Latin America.

As of 2025, the show currently is on both Disney+ and Apple TV.
