= Spork (film) =

- Theatrical release poster
- Directed by: J.B. Ghuman Jr.
- Written by: J.B. Ghuman Jr.
- Produced by: Christopher Racster; Chad Allen; Honey Labrador; Geric Miller-Frost
- Starring: Savannah Stehlin; Sydney Park; Rachel G. Fox; Michael William Arnold; Oana Gregory; Rodney Eastman; Beth Grant; Yeardley Smith; Keith David; Elaine Hendrix; Richard Riehle
- Cinematography: Bradley Stonesifer
- Edited by: Phillip J. Bartell
- Music by: Casey James and The Staypuft Kid
- Production companies: Neca Films; Last Bastion Entertainment; Bent Film; 11:11 Entertainment Inc.; Archer Productions
- Distributed by: Underhill Films
- Release date: May 27, 2011 (United States)
- Running time: 90 minutes
- Country: United States
- Language: English

Spork is a 2011 American independent coming-of-age musical comedy-drama film produced by Christopher Racster, Chad Allen, Honey Labrador and Geric Miller-Frost, written and directed by J.B. Ghuman Jr. and starring Savannah Stehlin, Sydney Park, Rachel G. Fox, Michael William Arnold, Oana Gregory, Rodney Eastman, Beth Grant, Yeardley Smith of The Simpsons fame, Keith David, Elaine Hendrix and Richard Riehle. The film was theatrically released in the United States on May 27, 2011 and received mixed reviews from film critics.

== Plot ==
Set in Los Angeles, California, a 14-year-old teenage girl nicknamed "Spork" is unpopular, mistreated by her classmates, and very soft-spoken. Her next-door neighbor and best friend, known as "Tootsie Roll", is planning on entering the school Dance-Off to win $236 which she would use to visit her father in prison. During a hair-product-related dancing accident, Tootsie Roll injures her ankle and can no longer compete in the competition. Spork rises to the occasion and surprises the whole school by signing up for the Dance-Off.

Spork and Tootsie Roll listen to hip-hop songs from the early 1990s and wear 1990s fashion, yet the antagonist, Betsy Byotch, and her friends wear 1980s garb and listen to 1980s music (though they are also fans of Britney Spears). The character of Charlie is obsessed with Justin Timberlake, whose career began in the mid–1990s. The use of the term "hermaphrodite" rather than "intersex" as a qualifier, including as a personal identity, also seems to imply a 1990s setting.

It is mentioned throughout the film that Spork and Charlie are obsessed with The Wizard of Oz, though Spork's love is for the 1978 film The Wiz, and Charlie's is for the 1939 The Wizard of Oz.

== Cast ==
- Savannah Stehlin as Spork
- Sydney Park as Tootsie Roll
- Rachel G. Fox as Betsy Byotch
- Michael William Arnold as Charlie
- Oana Gregory as Loosie Goosie
- Beth Grant as Principal Tulip
- Elaine Hendrix as Felicia
- Yeardley Smith as Ms. Danahy
- Rodney Eastman as Spit
- Keith David as Coach Jenkins
- Richard Riehle as Clyde

== Critical reception ==
On the review aggregator website Rotten Tomatoes, 55% of 11 critics' reviews are positive, with an average rating of 6.1/10. Metacritic, which uses a weighted average, assigned the film a score of 54 out of 100, based on 6 critics, indicating "mixed or average" reviews.
