= Dream House (2011 film) =

2011 American psychological thriller film by Jim Sheridan

- Theatrical release poster
- Directed by: Jim Sheridan
- Written by: David Loucka
- Produced by: James G. Robinson; David C. Robinson; Daniel Bobker; Ehren Kruger
- Starring: Daniel Craig; Naomi Watts; Rachel Weisz; Marton Csokas; Elias Koteas; Jane Alexander
- Cinematography: Caleb Deschanel
- Edited by: Glen Scantlebury; Barbara Tulliver
- Music by: John Debney
- Production companies: Morgan Creek Productions; Bobker/Kruger Films
- Distributed by: Universal Pictures (United States & Italy); Entertainment One (Canada)
- Release date: September 30, 2011
- Running time: 92 minutes
- Countries: United States; Canada
- Language: English
- Budget: $50 million
- Box office: $40 million

Dream House is a 2011 American psychological thriller film directed by Jim Sheridan from Universal Pictures and Morgan Creek Productions, starring Daniel Craig, Rachel Weisz, Naomi Watts, and Marton Csokas. The film was released on September 30, 2011, in the United States and Canada, and was a critical and commercial failure.

== Plot ==
Will Atenton, a successful editor for a New York City publishing house, quits his job to focus on writing a book while spending more time with his wife Libby and their young daughters, Trish and Dee Dee. The family is initially happy to live in their Fairfield County "dream house" near the forest. Soon, they grow uneasy because of a series of unsettling events. It all seems to tie to a crime committed in the house five years earlier, when a man named Peter Ward apparently murdered his wife and two children and was committed to a mental hospital from which he has been recently released due to lack of evidence.

Will approaches his neighbor Ann for help, but she is apprehensive, while her estranged husband Jack is outright hostile. Will visits the facility where Peter Ward was housed, and discovers that he is actually Peter Ward.

During the attack that claimed the lives of his wife and daughters, Peter was shot in the head, so he has no memories of the murders. In order to cope with the grief, he fabricated a delusion in which his family is still alive and created a new identity based on his inpatient ID band "W1-1L 8-10-10". Once dismissed, Peter moved back to his abandoned house, which is now condemned, but in Peter's mind, is still unspoiled.

Peter is forcibly removed from the dilapidated house by authorities and taken in by Ann, who believes in his innocence. Peter ultimately discovers that he did not kill his wife and children; it was a local man named Boyce, who broke in and shot Peter's family. Libby, while aiming at Boyce, accidentally shot Peter.

Peter and Ann are attacked by Jack, who reveals that he had hired Boyce to kill Ann five years earlier in retaliation for divorcing him and to obtain full custody of their daughter, Chloe. However, Boyce went to the wrong house and mistakenly killed Peter's family. Aided by Boyce, Jack decides to kill Ann himself and set the house on fire, framing Peter. He also shoots Boyce to eliminate him as a witness and as punishment for his mistake. Peter overpowers Jack and saves Ann with the help of Libby, who is revealed to be a spirit, as are their daughters, and not Peter's mental projection. Jack burns to death when he tries to escape.

Peter says goodbye to the spirits of his wife and children. Sometime later, Peter has returned to New York and published a best-selling book called Dream House, in which he recounts his tragic experiences.

== Cast ==
- Daniel Craig as Will Atenton/Peter Ward
- Naomi Watts as Ann Patterson
- Rachel Weisz as Libby Atenton/Elizabeth Ward
- Claire Geare as Dee Dee Atenton/Katherine Ward
- Taylor Geare as Trish Atenton/Beatrice Ward
- Marton Csokas as Jack Patterson
- Rachel G. Fox as Chloe Patterson
- Elias Koteas as Boyce
- Jane Alexander as Dr. Fran Greeley
- Martin Roach as Tommy
- Brian Murray as Dr. Medlin

== Production ==
Director Jim Sheridan reportedly clashed with Morgan Creek's James G. Robinson on the set over the shape of the script and production of the film. According to the Los Angeles Times, Sheridan tried to take his name off the film after being unhappy with it and his relationship with Morgan Creek Productions.

Reportedly Sheridan, Daniel Craig and Rachel Weisz disliked the final cut of the film. The trailer was criticised for revealing the film's main plot twist.

== Soundtrack ==
Dream House: Original Motion Picture Soundtrack

Soundtrack album by John Debney
- Released: 11 October 2011
- Recorded: 2011
- Genre: Soundtrack
- Length: 56:47
- Label: Varèse Sarabande
- Producer: Stephanie Pereida

Professional ratings
Review scores
Source	Rating
Allmusic	link
Filmtracks	link

The score to Dream House was composed by John Debney and conducted by Robert Ziegler. Christian Clemmensen, reviewer of Filmtracks.com, gave it four out of five stars, declaring it "among the biggest surprises of 2011" and stating, "It's not clear how badly Debney's work for Dream House was butchered by the studio's frantic last minute attempts to make the film presentable, but Debney's contribution does feature a cohesive flow of development that is, at least on album, a worthy souvenir from this otherwise messy situation." The soundtrack was released on 11 October 2011 and features 15 tracks of score at a running time of 56 minutes.

No.	Title	Length
1.	"Dream House"	5:36
2.	"Little Girls Die"	2:53
3.	"Footprints in the Snow"	3:17
4.	"Peter Searches"	6:00
5.	"Night Fever"	1:33
6.	"Intruders"	1:41
7.	"Libby Sees Graffiti"	2:33
8.	"Peter Ward's Room"	2:10
9.	"Ghostly Playthings"	3:17
10.	"Peter Ward's Story"	3:13
11.	"Ghost House"	2:37
12.	"Remember Libby"	4:05
13.	"Murder Flashback"	3:59
14.	"Peter Saves Ann/Redemption"	7:29
15.	"Dream House End Credits"	5:55

== Reception ==
Dream House was not screened in advance for critics, who panned the film. On the review aggregator website Rotten Tomatoes, 7% of 86 critics' reviews are positive, with an average rating of 3.7/10. The website's consensus reads: "Dream House is punishingly slow, stuffy, and way too obvious to be scary." Metacritic, which uses a weighted average, assigned the film a score of 35 out of 100, based on 16 critics, indicating "generally unfavorable" reviews. Audiences polled by CinemaScore gave the film an average grade of "B" on an A+ to F scale.

Peter Bradshaw of The Guardian gave it 2/5 stars, calling it "a workmanlike movie that is never quite scary enough, and never quite ingenious enough, though the four leads do an honest enough job." Empire's Angie Errigo also gave it 2/5 stars, writing, "Like most of its ilk, this starts off nicely but doesn't hold up to close rational scrutiny. Craig and Weisz are gorgeous together and the mystification is diverting." Mark Savlov of The Austin Chronicle gave it 1/5 stars, deeming it "a confounding mess despite its impressive cast and director".

Slant Magazine's Rob Humanick was more positive. He gave the film 2.5/4 stars, writing, "Compared to profound works about family like In America, Dream House is junk, but it’s enjoyable junk with a lick of human interest and the good sense to not take itself too seriously in the end".

== Remake ==
In 2021, it was reported that Morgan Creek Entertainment would be developing a remake of the film.

== See also ==
- Rabbit Hole (Play)
- Rabbit Hole (Film)
- Talaash
