= Trey Bender =

American sportscaster

- Born: Trey Stephen Bender; April 13, 1968 (age 58); Garden City, Kansas, U.S.
- Education: University of Kansas (BA)
- Occupation: Sportscaster
- Spouse: Amy Elizabeth Bombard (m. 1995)
- Children: Landry Bender
- Father: Gary Bender

Trey Stephen Bender (born April 13, 1968) is a sportscaster for ESPNU, ESPN Plus, American Sports Network, and a part-time host for Yahoo! Sports Radio.

== Broadcasting biography ==
Bender calls football, basketball, baseball, and swimming for ESPNU, ESPN Plus, ESPN3, and NBC Universal. For six seasons, he called television games for the Kansas Jayhawks where he graduated. Bender also worked in the Chicago and Phoenix markets. He called college sports for Fox Sports Net Arizona and FSN Chicago and called Arizona State Sun Devils baseball as well. For three years, Bender was the voice of the Loyola Ramblers men's basketball team and was an anchor on Sporting News Radio. He also is a part-time host for Yahoo! Sports Radio. Bender's broadcasting career started with the LA Angels minor league baseball team in Boise in 1991.

He then moved to Arizona in 1993 as the voice of the Arizona Rattlers as a play-by-play, radio host and radio field reporter. Bender would remain with the AFL through 2002. Additional AFL broadcasts included the AFL playoffs on TNN and play-by-play broadcasts for the Carolina Cobras. Bender would also serve as a play-by-play broadcaster for SportsWest Productions from 1999 until the company folded after the Mountain West Conference entered into a new TV contract with Comcast and CBS Sports to form the Mtn. in 2006. After finishing college football broadcasts with SportsWest in 2005, Bender transitioned back to the radio and served as a play-by-play broadcaster for the Insight Bowl and select Arizona State games on KKNT during the 2005 and 2006 season.

== Personal life ==
Trey Bender graduated from the University of Kansas with a Bachelor of Arts degree in Broadcast journalism in 1991 and is the son of Gary Bender, a veteran broadcaster who also graduated from the University of Kansas. Trey's wife, Amy whom he married in 1995, like Trey and Gary, is also a sportscaster. Their only daughter Landry is named after Tom Landry, who was the head coach of the Dallas Cowboys.

Bender has a younger brother named Brett.
