= Savannah Stehlin =

American actress (born 1996)

- Born: March 6, 1996 (age 29); Jacksonville, Florida, U.S.
- Occupation: Actress
- Years active: 2005–present

Savannah Stehlin (born March 6, 1996) is an American actress. Savannah's most known role is Spork, the leading role in the musical comedy film Spork. She has also appeared in four episodes of the TV series Sleeper Cell and, in 2016, had the role of Elsie Holloway in the horror thriller film Viscilla.

== Biography ==
=== Early life ===
Stehlin was born in Jacksonville, Florida. She began her acting career at age 2 in the nationally televised Fort Lauderdale Christmas Pageant. By the age of 4, she had landed the part of a soloist in the pageant. Stehlin performed in 15 shows, each with a live audience of 3,000 people. Later, she began auditioning for commercials throughout Florida and, shortly after, was booked on a non-union Burdines commercial. By the age of 6, Stehlin had booked several national commercials. While working on a Publix commercial, she came in contact with her current manager, Sharon Lane. She moved to L.A. soon after.

=== Music ===
Savannah Stehlin, at the age of 13, started writing and performing songs including: "I'm Carrying My Heart," "I'm in Love," and "Why, Oh Why."

== Filmography ==
Year	Title	Role	Notes
2005	The Family Stone	Elizabeth Trousdale	Feature film
2006	Gilmore Girls	Cissy	TV series; 1 episode, "The Real Paul Anka"
2006	Cold Case	Melanie Campbell	TV series; 1 episode, "Fireflies"
2006	Sleeper Cell	Dakota Rossman	TV series; 4 episodes.
2006	Hannah Montana	Patty Dontzig	TV series; 1 episode, "Torn Between Two Hannahs"
2007	Hannah Montana	Patty Dontzig	TV series; 1 episode, "Bad Moose Rising"
2007	ER	Charlotte Paxton	TV series; 1 episode, "From Here to Paternity"
2007	State of Mind	Hazel McKenzie	TV series; 1 episode, "In Bocca Al Lupo"
2007	Seven's Eleven: Sweet Toys	Noodle	Short
2008	The Return of Jezebel James	Zoe	TV series; 1 episode, "Pilot"
2008	According to Jim	Rebecca	TV series; 1 episode, "The Chaperone"
2009	Without a Trace	Megan Dobbs	TV series; 1 episode, "Wanted"
2009	Boxed In	Judith	Short
2011	Spork	Spork	Leading role in feature film
2013	Contribution of a Verse	Jo	Short
2016	The Axe Murders of Villisca	Elsie Holloway	Feature film
