= Rachel G. Fox =

American actress

- Born: 1996 or 1997 (age 29–30)
- Occupation: Actress
- Years active: 2005–2015; 2023–present

Rachel G. Fox (born 1996 or 1997) is an American actress best known for playing Kayla Huntington Scavo in the ABC television series Desperate Housewives.

== Career ==
=== Acting career ===
Fox has also appeared on Alias, That's So Raven, iCarly, Hannah Montana, as well as voicing characters in the video games Ant Bully and Thrillville.

She appeared on ABC's Desperate Housewives from September 2006 until May 2008 as a series regular, portraying Lynette's sociopathic step-daughter Kayla Huntington.

In July 2009, Fox filmed the movie Spork, which was released in 2010 which would be her first lead movie role. She also starred in Jim Sheridan's Dream House, portraying Chloe Patterson, daughter of Ann and Jack Patterson (played by Naomi Watts and Marton Csokas, respectively).

She recurred as Holly Reback in the ABC Family sitcom Melissa & Joey.

=== Finance career ===
Fox on Stocks, launched in 2012 and said to be Fox's stock-trading blog, describes her as "a very successful stock trader in her free time," and says that it "provides education for those wishing to learn more about investing."

In 2016, after publications stated that she was purportedly employed as a trader by Jacob Wohl, Fox has denied any connection with Wohl.

== Filmography ==
=== Film ===
Year	Title	Role	Notes
2010	Spork	Betsy Byotch	
2011	Dream House	Chloe Patterson	
2012	Jewtopia	Jill Lipschitz	

=== Television ===
Year	Title	Role	Notes
2006	Passions	Older Jane	1 episode
2006	Alias	Young Sydney	"All the Time in the World"
2006	Hannah Montana	Young Fan	"It's a Mannequins World:
2006	That's So Raven	Buffy	"Sister Act", "Rae of Sunshine"
2006–08	Desperate Housewives	Kayla Huntington Scavo	Recurring role
2008	iCarly	Amber Tate	"iCarly Saves TV"
2009	The New Adventures of Old Christine	Gretchen	"The Curious Case of Britney B."
2011	Vince Uncensored	Rosie Donohue	TV film
2011–12	Melissa & Joey	Holly Reback	Recurring role
2012	Private Practice	Missy Spencer	"And Then There Was One"
2012	I'm Not Dead Yet	Melanie Lazarus	TV film
2013	Zombie Night	Tracie Jackson	TV film
2015	Wuthering High School	Bella Linton	TV film
2015	CSI: Cyber	Elizabeth Marks	"Selfie 2.0"

== Awards ==
Year	Result	Award	Category	Nominated work
2007	Nominated	Young Artist Awards	Best Recurring Young Actress in a Television Series	Desperate Housewives
2008	Nominated	Screen Actors Guild Awards	Outstanding Ensemble Cast	Desperate Housewives
2008	Nominated	Young Artist Awards	Best Recurring Young Actress in a Comedy Series	Desperate Housewives
2009	Nominated	Screen Actors Guild Awards	Outstanding Ensemble Cast	Desperate Housewives

In 2014, Fox was named one of "The 25 Most Influential Teens of 2014" by Time magazine.
