= Surviving Jack =

American television comedy series

- Genre: Comedy
- Created by: Justin Halpern; Patrick Schumacker
- Based on: I Suck at Girls by Justin Halpern
- Starring: Christopher Meloni; Rachael Harris; Connor Buckley; Claudia Lee; Kevin Hernandez; Tyler Foden
- Narrated by: Kevin Rahm
- Opening theme: "Story of My Life" performed by Social Distortion
- Composer: Jamie Jackson
- Country of origin: United States
- Original language: English
- No. of seasons: 1
- No. of episodes: 8 (1 unaired in the United States)

Production
- Executive producers: Bill Lawrence; Justin Halpern; Patrick Schumacker; Jeff Ingold
- Producer: Zachary Rosenblatt
- Camera setup: Single-camera
- Running time: 22 minutes
- Production companies: Doozer; Warner Bros. Television

Original release
- Network: Fox
- Release: March 27 – May 8, 2014

Surviving Jack is an American sitcom that aired as a mid-season replacement on Fox as part of the 2013–14 American television season. On May 8, 2013, Fox placed a thirteen-episode order for the single-camera comedy. The pilot is written by Justin Halpern and Patrick Schumacker, and the series is based on Halpern's autobiographical book I Suck at Girls. On October 25, 2013, the order of episodes was cut to eight, due to scheduling restrictions.

On May 7, 2014, Fox canceled the series after one season, and 7 episodes broadcast, leaving a single episode unaired, and the remaining episodes have never been circulated. They later aired the last episode, episode eight, in New Zealand on TV2.

== Synopsis ==
Set in Southern California, in 1991, the series centers on Jack Dunlevy, an ex-military man and no-nonsense guy who becomes a full-time parent when his wife decides to go to law school. He takes an unorthodox approach to keeping his kids, a boy, Frankie and a girl, Rachel, in line.

== Cast ==
- Christopher Meloni as Dr. Jack Dunlevy, a blunt talking, former military man, now a doctor, who, after many years, is assuming the parent responsibilities now that his wife is going back to law school.
- Rachael Harris as Joanne Dunlevy, a loving wife and mom, who is going back to law school. She longs to have her home be the neighborhood "hangout house."
- Connor Buckley as Frankie Dunlevy, a typical, awkward freshman teenager, who is usually the focus point of all of Jack's parenting mistakes.
- Claudia Lee as Rachel Dunlevy, a super conceited, over confident, super popular senior in high school. She can't stand any of her brother Frankie's friends.
- Kevin Hernandez as George, Frankie's best friend since second grade. He has a huge crush on Rachel.
- Tyler Foden as Mikey, one of Frankie's best friends, who comes from a broken home. This is his second year as a freshman.
- Mell Bowser as Craig

== Critical reception ==
Review aggregation website, Rotten Tomatoes gives Surviving Jack a score of 68% average rating of 6.2 out of 10, based on 31 reviews. The website's consensus reads: "Christopher Meloni's comedic chops help sell Surviving Jack's fresh twist on gender roles and the traditional sitcom formula, even if the show falls a little flat in other areas." Metacritic gives the show a weighted average score of 65 out of 100, based on reviews from 24 critics, indicating "generally favorable" reviews.

== Episodes ==
No.	Title	Directed by	Written by	Original release date	Prod. code	US viewers (millions)
1	"Pilot"	Victor Nelli Jr.	Justin Halpern & Patrick Schumacker	March 27, 2014	276064	5.15
It is a day of firsts for everyone, Frankie's first day of high school, where he finds out Heather Bluemyer knows he exists, Jack's first day of full time parenting, which isn't as cut and dried and simple as he thought. Joanne's first day of law school and she's bogged down with homework. As the week goes on, Jack finds out the sex talk needs to be more than a box of condoms with a post it note, his daughter's letting her boyfriend go to second base, Joanne's second guessing going back to school and Frankie has an embarrassing first kiss moment.
2	"Gonna Make You Sweat"	Joe Nussbaum	Jim Brandon & Brian Singleton	April 3, 2014	4X5457	4.53
The boys have reluctantly asked Jack to help get them in shape to try out for Varsity baseball. His training regime includes 5 am water hose drills, shotguns and fake heart attacks, but it gets the results they hope for. Joanne, on her quest to achieve the neighborhood hangout house, catches Rachel making out with a boy who's not Doug.
3	"How Do You Talk To An Angel"	Ken Whittingham	Bill Callahan	April 10, 2014	4X5453	4.32
The Homecoming Dance is approaching and Frankie is finding it hard to ask Heather to go with him. Jack blows his one good opportunity with the world's weirdest water break. Other chances result in skipping school, possible bodily harm and school suspension. Rachel's punishment for attending a concert is George and Joanne teaches Jack a lesson in tolerance.
4	"Rhythm is a Dancer"	Michael McDonald	Zack Rosenblatt	April 17, 2014	4X5454	4.29
With Frankie finally having a date to Homecoming, Jack and Joanne think they have the house to themselves for an evening, but a ban on grinding at the dance, may interrupt their plans when Rachel decides she's going to protest. The boys meet George's cousin and wonder where he lost in the family gene pool and Frankie sees and opportunity with Heather and takes a chance at love.
5	"Something to Talk About"	Roger Kumble	Emily Heller	April 24, 2014	4X5456	3.89
Frankie won Heather over with his grand gesture at the dance, now comes the hard part, keeping her. Joanne's recovery from surgery isn't going as calmly as he'd liked so it has Jack tossing everyone into the pool. Mikey and George are on a quest to acquire the elusive "Casablanca" video tape in the Dunlevy household.
6	"She Drives Me Crazy"	John Putch	Corinne Marshall	May 1, 2014	4X5458	3.92
Joanne learns Frankie's outgrowing their annual mother/son weekends away. Rachel thinks she's found a loop hole in her college prep requirements with her parents, by joining the wrestling team. Jack is on a mission to break Mikey and George's habit of coming into the house whenever they please without knocking.
7	"Parents Just Don't Understand"	Michael Weaver	Sierra Teller Ornelas	May 8, 2014	4X5455	4.00
Jack and Joanne are at odds with each other when both kids betray their trust Frankie has his first taste of alcohol at a varsity baseball party, and Rachel wants to go on the birth control pills.
8	"Smells Like Teen Spirit"	James Hayman	Justin Halpern & Patrick Schumacker	September 24, 2014 (NZ); Unaired (US)	4X5452	0.0933 (Note: This viewership number represents the number of New Zealand viewers. The episode didn't air in the United States.)
Jack must watch Rachel and her friends while Joanne goes to study in the library. The trouble starts when she secretly invites boys. Meanwhile Frankie is dealing with the school bully.
