= Justin Halpern =

American screenwriter (born 1980)

- Born: Justin Samuel Halpern; September 3, 1980 (age 46); San Diego, California, U.S.
- Education: San Diego State University
- Occupations: Author, screenwriter
- Spouse: Amanda Schweizer (m. 2011)
- Writing career
- Genre: Comedy
- Website: twitter.com/shitmydadsays

Justin Samuel Halpern (born September 3, 1980) is the American author of the Twitter feed "Shit My Dad Says" and the best-selling book Sh*t My Dad Says. He was also the co-writer and co-executive producer of a CBS television situation comedy series based on the book. His second book I Suck at Girls was published in 2012 and was the basis for the 2014 television show Surviving Jack.

== Early life ==
Halpern grew up in the Point Loma neighborhood of San Diego, California. His father is Jewish and his Italian American mother is Catholic.

Halpern's father Samuel Halpern is a retired doctor of nuclear medicine who practiced at the University of California, San Diego (UCSD). He has been described as "a profane comic genius," "Lenny Bruce with a stethoscope," and "a scatological Socrates showering rough wisdom on his son."

Halpern attended Point Loma High School, where he was a pitcher on the school's CIF-champion baseball team. He also played baseball briefly at San Diego State University, where he graduated in 2003. He then headed to Hollywood to seek work as a screenwriter; there he wrote screenplays and worked as a waiter, but success as a screenwriter eluded him.

== Writing ==
By 2009, Halpern was a full-time writer for Maxim magazine's online publication. Halpern returned to San Diego to live with his girlfriend of three years, but the relationship ended following the move and Halpern then moved back to the family home.

Halpern's record of his father's comments—some repeated to him by brothers, cousins, and other relatives—dates back to when he was four or five years of age. When he recommenced living with his parents, his record of his father's remarks became a daily journal. On August 3, 2009, Halpern started a Twitter feed with the handle "@shitmydadsays" to store his father's rhetorical gems; the writer thought the content might be useful for a future script.

To Halpern's surprise, the Twitter profile quickly gathered a large following. A friend posted a link to his feed; when Rob Corddry mentioned the site "that really jump-started it," according to Halpern. By mid-August 2009, Halpern had garnered more than 100,000 followers; by October 2009, he had signed a book deal with HarperCollins; and a television deal with Warner Bros. was secured by the end of November 2009. By November 2010, the Twitter feed was followed by more than 1.8 million people and, by September of the following year, this number had risen to over 2.6 million. As of June 10, 2013, the feed was followed by over 3.1 million people. Though Halpern only posted sporadically after 2014, as of March 2024 the feed still had over 2.1 million followers.

Together with his longtime writing partner Patrick Schumacker, Halpern completed the book Sh*t My Dad Says in February 2010, and it was published in May 2010. In June of the same year, the book topped The New York Times Best Seller list for hardcover nonfiction and remained in the number one position for eleven weeks. The book remained on the best seller list for fifty weeks and eventually sold 1.2 million copies.

Following the cancellation of the CBS television series that was based on Sh*t My Dad Says, Halpern wrote for Grantland.com. His second book I Suck at Girls was published on May 15, 2012, and the writer sold the television rights for the book. The 2014 Fox Television show Surviving Jack was based on this book. He also had another television project titled Sidelined.

== Television ==
The television show based on Halpern's debut book was called $#*! My Dad Says (pronounced "Bleep My Dad Says") with William Shatner in the title role as the colorful curmudgeon. The pilot, written by Halpern and Schumacker, was filmed in March 2010, CBS picked it up in May, and the show premiered on September 23, 2010. Halpern explained the series as "the dichotomy of this older guy who says whatever he wants and this younger guy who is tiptoeing through life," with the latter careful not to offend anyone for fear of losing jobs or friends.

The series was cancelled in May 2011, and the conversation between Halpern and his father, in which the news is shared, was published on Halpern's Tumblr page. In his response to his son's revelation, Samuel Halpern stated that he liked the television series: "Well, I liked it [$#*! My Dad Says]. It was kind of shitty at first, but I thought it got a lot better. You know what show I like? Cheers. That was a good show."

In 2011, Halpern worked as a writer for the short-lived comedy series How to Be a Gentleman, but the show was cancelled after four episodes.

In 2019, Halpern joined other WGA writers in firing their agents as part of the WGA's stand against the ATA and the practice of packaging.

In 2020, Halpern became a writer and Executive Producer on the animated series Harley Quinn.

Since 2021, Halpern has been Showrunner/Executive Producer of Abbott Elementary on ABC, alongside his writing partner Patrick Schumacker. It won a Peabody Award in 2022.

== Live performance ==
Halpern performed in Los Angeles' comedy showcase Don't Tell My Mother! in October 2012; Halpern's segment was entitled "Justin Halpern Will Never Screw a Woman Who Looks Like That". The show featured comics, actors and screenwriters such as Mary Birdsong (Reno 911!) and Jen Kober (American Reunion) as they recounted experiences that they would never share with their mothers.

== Personal life ==
Halpern married Amanda Schweizer on May 29, 2011, and as of May 2012, the couple divided their time between a Bankers Hill, San Diego apartment and a house in Los Angeles.
