= Crash & Bernstein =

American sitcom (2012–2014)

- Genre: Sitcom; Puppetry
- Created by: Eric Friedman
- Starring: Cole Jensen; Landry Bender; Oana Gregory; Aaron R. Landon
- Voices of: Tim Lagasse
- Opening theme: "Crash & Bernstein" performed by Cole Jensen and Tim Lagasse
- Ending theme: "Crash & Bernstein" (short version) (season 2)
- Composer: Jamie Dunlap
- Country of origin: United States
- Original language: English
- No. of seasons: 2
- No. of episodes: 39 (list of episodes)

Production
- Executive producers: Mike Larsen; Eric Friedman; Jim Armogida & Steve Armogida
- Producer: Jason Shubb
- Camera setup: Multi-camera
- Production company: It's a Laugh Productions

Original release
- Network: Disney XD
- Release: October 8, 2012 – August 11, 2014

Related
- Electric Bloom

Crash & Bernstein is an American television sitcom created by Eric Friedman that aired on Disney XD from October 8, 2012, to August 11, 2014. The series stars Cole Jensen, Landry Bender, Oana Gregory, and Aaron R. Landon, with Sesame Street and Muppets performer Tim Lagasse as the voice and puppeteer for Crash. Greg Ballora works as the puppet captain. It centers on a boy with three sisters who wishes to have a brother. His wish comes true when he builds his own brother. Production for the series began in April 2012.

Disney XD renewed the series for a second season on April 15, 2013, which premiered on October 7, 2013. On August 11, 2014, the series was cancelled after 39 episodes.

== Premise ==
Wyatt Bernstein is a boy who lives with his mom Mel and his sisters Cleo, Jasmine and Amanda in the city of Portland, Oregon (the location was revealed in the series intro). For his 12th birthday, Wyatt is taken to a store called Build-A-Bestie where he creates a puppet named Crash, who joins the family as the brother he always wanted. Crash and Wyatt must deal with the sisters, while having their brotherly differences and still watching each other's back.

== Episodes ==
Season	Episodes	Originally released	
Season	Episodes	First released	Last released
1	26	October 8, 2012	September 9, 2013
2	13	October 7, 2013	August 11, 2014

== Characters ==
=== Main ===
- Crash (performed by Tim Lagasse) – a puppet character who was created at the time of Wyatt's visit to Build-A-Bestie. He has a reckless and destructive personality where he often causes some damages in the Bernsteins' apartment. Crash is very gullible and dim-witted and often gets either himself or others in trouble, but overall he has a good heart and his intentions are usually in the right place. However, he can be prone to jealousy at times. Tim Lagasse was assisted in performing Crash by Paul McGinnis and Rob Saunders who operated the arms, legs, and props of Crash.
- Wyatt Bernstein (played by Cole Jensen) – a 12-year-old boy and the middle child in the Bernstein family among three sisters. Wyatt wishes to have a brother, which results in him building Crash at Build-A-Bestie. He is often exasperated by Crash's antics, especially when they get him in trouble too, but generally loves spending time with his brother. He is best friends with Pesto.
- Cleopatra "Cleo" Bernstein (played by Landry Bender) – Amanda, Wyatt and Jasmine's 13-year-old sister who shares a room with Wyatt. She makes products for her company called "CLEO" where she serves as the self-proclaimed CEO. It is revealed that she has a crush on Pesto. Cleo is often bossy, but is considered to be the superior member of the family. Cleo is very business-savvy and will sell just about anything from makeup and lotions to "monster truck" dirt to make money.
- Amanda Bernstein (played by Oana Gregory) – Wyatt, Cleo and Jasmine's 16-year-old sister. She's very popular, and Pesto has a crush on her. Amanda is very sociable, but can also be annoying to other characters (Especially Crash, Wyatt, and Pesto), She is the "it" girl for English and Australian boys, and likes to enjoy herself and have fun.
- Pesto (played by Aaron Landon) – Wyatt's friend. His parents own Iconic Arcade, which is where he works. Pesto has a crush on Amanda and often tries to woo her, but fails miserably. He's often shown to be a momma's boy and mentions his mother in several episodes.

=== Recurring ===
- Jasmine Bernstein (played by Mckenna Grace) – Amanda, Wyatt, and Cleo's 6-year-old sister. Jasmine is the youngest member of the Bernstein family. She might be a cute and adorable little girl, but Jasmine is a spoiled brat. When Jasmine doesn't get her way she throws a tantrum. She owns a doll named Princess Glitter that Crash is in love with.
- Melanie "Mel" Bernstein (played by Mary Birdsong) – the wife of Karl and the mother of Amanda, Wyatt, Cleo and Jasmine. Mel doesn't approve of Crash.
- Scottie (played by Curtis Harris) – one of Wyatt's friends at Linus Pauling Middle School. He is also the host of the school's show "Good Morning Linus Pauling."
- Martin Poulos (played by Danny Woodburn) – the landlord of the Bernsteins' apartment building. He carries around a swear jar which he swears into so that nobody can hear his profanity. In "Crashlemania," it's revealed that he was a wrestler named "Plunger" when he was a wrestling partner of Coach Urkhart.
- Rufus "The Slapper" Reeds (played by Zachary Conneen) – the school bully at Linus Pauling Middle School.
- Mrs. Lopez – A tenant in the Bernsteins' apartment building who is a known cat lady. Although she owns a lot of cats, Mrs. Lopez also owns a Basset Hound as seen in "Comic Book Crash."
- Roland (played by Ron Funches) – A newsdealer and vendor that works at the newsstand in Wyatt's neighborhood.
- Coach Urkhart (played by Chip Chinery) – The coach of the wrestling team at Wyatt's school and one of Martin Poulos' old friends. He and Martin were a wrestling duo where Coach Urkhart was the "Cyclone." In "Health-O-Ween," it's revealed that Coach Urkhart is a member of the Nightmare Society.
- Karl Bernstein (played by Richard Ruccolo) – the husband of Mel and the father of Amanda, Wyatt, Cleo and Jasmine who debuts in Season 2. He works as a wildlife photographer and travels a lot.

== Broadcast ==
Crash & Bernstein originally premiered on October 8, 2012, on Disney XD. It also aired on Disney Channel. It premiered on November 3, 2012, on Disney XD (Canada), on January 10, 2013, on Disney XD (UK and Ireland), and on February 9, 2013, on Disney XD (South Africa). In Australia the series premiered on April 19, 2013, on Disney Channel and on April 10, 2014. It aired reruns at the end of 2015 on Disney XD.

== Reception ==
Emily Ashby of Common Sense Media, which informs parents about media choices for their children, gave Crash & Bernstein a three star rating out of five, stating, "This is one of those case-by-case shows that needs you to be mindful of your child's response to what he or she sees on TV". She added, "Since much of the show's laughs result from the characters' misbehavior, it's important that viewers understand the difference between fantasy and reality. If your son and his brother decide to remedy a lack of space in their bedroom by knocking down a wall, that will have more serious consequences than what they see Wyatt and Crash suffer from the same action. If your kids do watch, be sure you talk about how the characters' actions would be received in the real world instead of the TV universe."

== Interactivity ==
In July 2013 on DisneyXD.com online, viewers could vote for their favorite nose for Crash. The winning nose was revealed during the second season's premiere. In conjunction with the second season's premiere, the website also launched "Crash & Bernstein: Cluck n' Chuck," an interactive game where fans play as Crash and Wyatt and take on the neighborhood. The game is playable on both computer and mobile devices.

== Cancelled spin-off ==
On July 10, 2014, it was reported that Disney XD had begun production for the pilot of a possible spin-off titled Commando Crash. The plot entails Crash enrolling in Oak Shield Military School. Adam Dorfman, Cameron Ocasio, Armaan Juneja, Nicholas Stargel, and Megan Goodman co-star in the pilot.
