= Oana Gregory =

Romanian actress and model (born 1996)

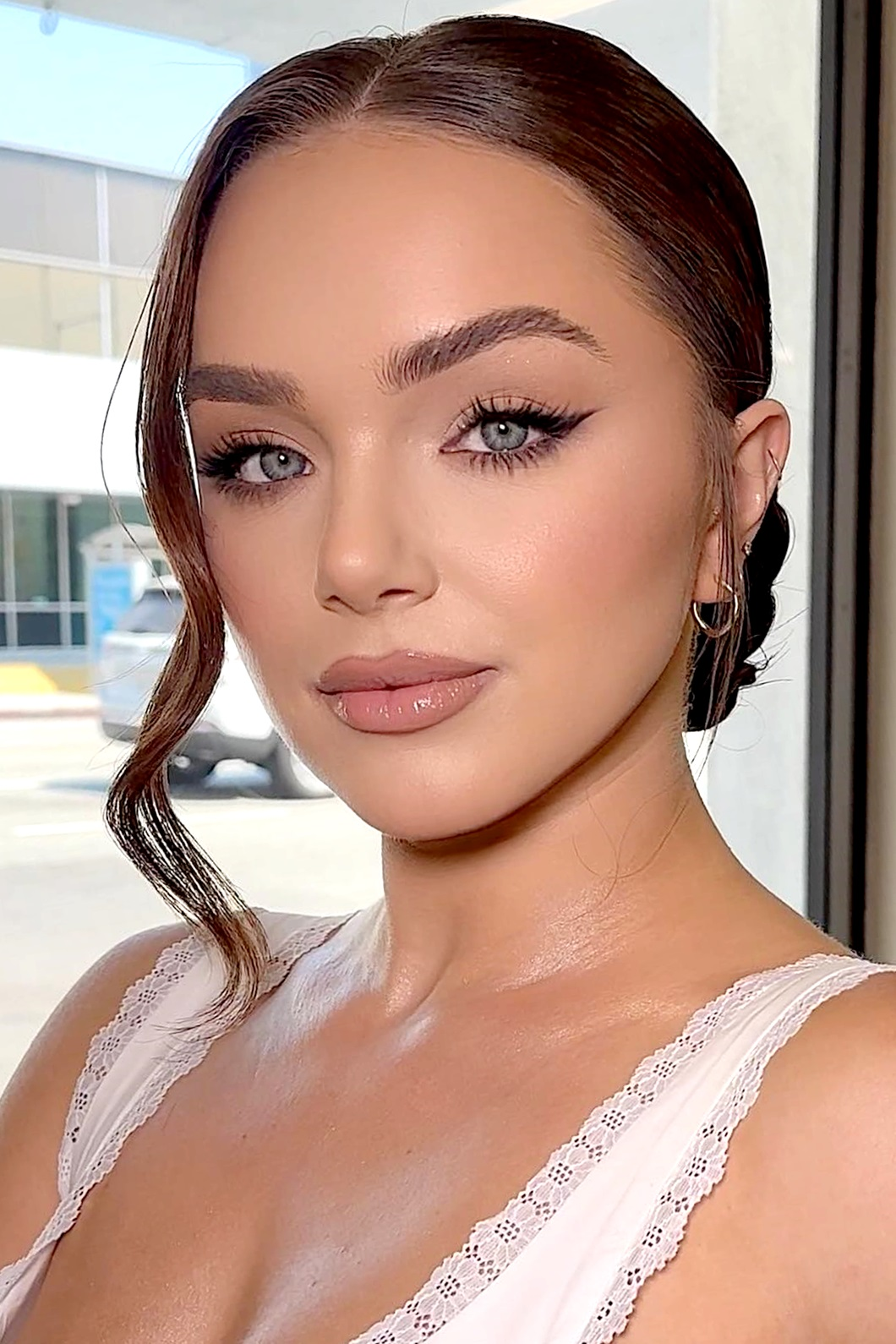
- Gregory in 2024
- Born: Oana Andreea Grigoruț; January 9, 1996 (age 30); Negrești-Oaș, Satu Mare, Romania
- Occupations: Actress; model
- Years active: 2009–present
- Modeling information
- Height: 163 cm (5 ft 4 in)
- Hair color: Blonde (dyed brunette)
- Eye color: Blue
- Agency: Content X

Oana Gregory (born Oana Andreea Grigoruț, Romanian pronunciation: [ˈo̯ana anˈdree̯a ɡriɡoˈruts]; January 9, 1996) is a Romanian-American actress and model. Established in the United States since October 2002, Gregory became internationally known for roles in Disney productions such as Kickin' It, Lab Rats and Crash & Bernstein.

== Early life ==
Oana Gregory was born to Dumitru and Mariana Grigoruț in Negrești-Oaș, a small town in northwestern Romania. When she was six, her family moved to the United States with the thought of building a better life, especially for Oana and her older brother, Dorel. Oana attended primary school in Chicago.

== Career ==
In 2006, Gregory participated in a contest organized by International Models & Talent Association. Of the 1,000 contestants from English-speaking countries, Gregory won the title of "actress of the year" at preteens and was declared the first runner-up – "model of the year", also at preteens. After this contest, Gregory received 54 bids from different agencies and managers in Hollywood who wanted to represent her.

In 2009, Oana lent her voice to the animated comedy television show Olivia, based on a popular children's book series. She landed her first feature film role as the leading "Loosie Goosie" in the independent film Spork (2011), a musical comedy drama that received three film festival awards, a CineKid Award and a British Film Institute nomination. In 2012, Gregory had recurring roles on Disney XD series Lab Rats and Kickin' It. In the same year, Gregory stars as Wyatt's popular 16-year-old sister, Amanda Bernstein, in Disney XD's live-action "bro-comedy" Crash & Bernstein (2012–2014), broadcast in 21 countries. For Amanda's role, Gregory was chosen from more than 2,600 contestants participating in the casting.

In 2016, she had a recurring role as Lacey on the comedy web series WTH: Welcome to Howler. Gregory portrayed young Laurel Samson in the television film A Christmas Switch (2018). In 2019, Oana appeared in the comedy series King Bachelor's Pad, and subsequently featured in the music video for the song "No Service in the Hills" by electronic music trio Cheat Codes, released in 2020.

== Filmography ==
Film roles
Year	Title	Role	Notes
2011	Spork	Loosie Goosie	
2018	A Christmas Switch	Laurel Samson	Television film

Television roles
Year	Title	Role	Notes
2009	Olivia	Additional voices	Voice role; 26 episodes
2012	Lab Rats	Stephanie	Recurring role
2012	Kickin' It	Mika	Recurring role
2012–2014	Crash & Bernstein	Amanda Bernstein	Main role
2016, 2018	WTH: Welcome to Howler	Lacey	Recurring role; web series
2019	King Bachelor's Pad	Gertrude	Recurring role

Music videos
Year	Title	Artists	Album
2020	"No Service in the Hills"	Cheat Codes ft. Trippie Redd, Blackbear, Prince$$ Rosie	Hellraisers, Pt. 2
