= Shit My Dad Says =

Twitter feed

Shit My Dad Says is a Twitter feed started by Justin Halpern who was then a semi-employed comedy writer. It consists of quotations made by Halpern's father, Sam, regarding various subjects. Halpern started the account on August 3, 2009 soon after moving from Los Angeles back to his parents' house in San Diego. He intended it only as a storage site for his father's salty comments, but a friend posted a link to it. Comedian Rob Corddry then tweeted the link and that really "jump-started it" according to Halpern. In less than a month the page was mentioned by The Daily Show, a popular San Francisco blog called Laughing Squid, and actress Kristen Bell. As of February 2024 the feed has 2.1 million followers. The account has largely been inactive since 2014 with only two tweets since then and none after 2017.

== Adaptations ==
=== Book ===
In September 2009 Halpern found an agent and started sifting through book deals. He signed an agreement with HarperCollins in October 2009. The book based on the feed, titled Sh*t My Dad Says, was co-written with Halpern's longtime writing partner Patrick Schumacker and was released on May 4, 2010. During its first week the book reached #8 on The New York Times Best Seller list for hardcover nonfiction. For six weeks after its release the book was #1 on the bestseller list.

=== Television series ===
In November 2009, CBS announced that it was developing a television sitcom based on the Twitter feed which would star William Shatner. The series, officially titled $#*! My Dad Says (spoken as Bleep My Dad Says), was green-lighted by CBS in May 2010 and began airing on CBS on Thursday nights.

On May 15, 2011, CBS announced that it had canceled $#*! My Dad Says despite winning the People's Choice Award for Best New Comedy.

== In popular culture ==
In 2011, Cartoon Network's MAD aired a parody promo for the TV adaptation, $h*! My Dad Says, called, "Meep! My Dad Says!" It is a crossover between $h*! My Dad Says and Looney Tunes which features the Road Runner playing the role of the dad. His classic "Meep! Meeps!" are used to imitate censor bleeps, with black bars being placed over his mouth when he speaks.
