= Landry Bender =

American actress (born 2000)

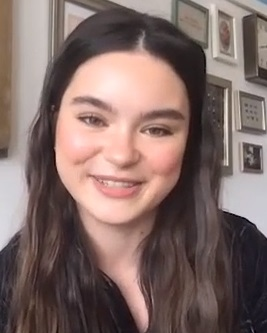
- Bender in 2023
- Born: Landry Elizabeth Bender; August 3, 2000 (age 26); Chicago, Illinois, U.S.
- Occupation: Actress
- Years active: 2011–present
- Parents: Trey Bender (father); Amy Bender (mother)
- Relatives: Gary Bender (paternal grandfather)

Landry Elizabeth Bender (born August 3, 2000) is an American actress. She is known for playing the role of Cleo Bernstein in the Disney XD series Crash & Bernstein, and playing Blithe Pedulla in the 2011 film The Sitter. Bender played one of the lead roles, Cyd Ripley, in the 2015–2016 Disney Channel sitcom Best Friends Whenever. From 2017 to 2020, she played Rocki in the Netflix sitcom Fuller House.

== Early life ==
Landry Elizabeth Bender was born on August 3, 2000 in Chicago, Illinois. She is the daughter and the only child of sportscaster Trey Bender and producer Amy Bender. She moved to Phoenix when she was two. She began taking acting classes at Desert Stages Theatre by age 5. She attended and graduated from Oak Park Independent School.

== Filmography ==
Television and film roles
Year	Title	Role	Notes
2011	Council of Dads	Mykala Wells	Unsold television pilot
2011	The Sitter	Blithe Pedulla	Film
2012–2014	Crash & Bernstein	Cleo Bernstein	Main role
2014	Jake and the Never Land Pirates	Little Sister	Voice role; episode: "The Singing Stones"
2014	Fairest of the Mall	Nikki	Unsold television pilot (Disney Channel)
2015–2016	Best Friends Whenever	Cyd Ripley	Co-lead role
2015	Liv and Maddie	Cyd Ripley	Episode: "Haunt-a-Rooney"
2017–2019	The Lion Guard	Makini	Recurring voice role (seasons 2–3)
2017–2020	Fuller House	Rocki	Recurring role (seasons 3–5)
2019	Looking for Alaska	Sara	Main role
2021	The Republic of Sarah	Bella	Main role
2023	Pure O	Rachel	Film
2025	Self-Help	Olivia	Film
