= Chip Chinery =

American actor and stand-up comedian

- Born: Lawrence Adams Chinery Jr. August 10, 1964 (age 62); Cincinnati, Ohio, U.S.
- Occupations: Actor; stand-up comedian
- Years active: 1980–present

Comedy career
- Medium: Stand-up, film, television
- Genre: Sketch comedy
- Website: www.chipchinery.com

Lawrence Adams "Chip" Chinery Jr. (born August 10, 1964) is an American actor and stand-up comedian.

== Early life ==
Lawrence Adams Chinery Jr. was born in Cincinnati, Ohio, and grew up in Anderson Township. He began writing jokes at age 13 and first performed stand-up comedy three years later at D.W. Eye, a bar in Cincinnati's Clifton neighborhood. Chinery subsequently put stand-up aside while completing high school and college.

Chinery graduated from St. Xavier High School and earned a bachelor's degree in psychology from Miami University. After college, he hosted a Cincinnati radio program called Comedy Spotlight. He also worked as a cameraman at WCPO-TV while performing at open-mic nights at the Funny Bone comedy club, and later worked as a banker before pursuing comedy professionally.

== Career ==
Chinery began touring full-time as a stand-up comedian in 1988. Over the following six years, he worked primarily on the comedy-club circuit before moving to Los Angeles in 1994 to pursue acting.

In 1993, he won a regional Emmy Award for On-Air Performer for his work on Frog News and Cincinnati's Comedy Relief.

After moving to Los Angeles, Chinery continued performing stand-up while auditioning for acting roles. His first television role was on 3rd Rock from the Sun, where he appeared several times as maintenance workers and other characters. His subsequent television work included appearances on The Drew Carey Show, Reba, Becker, Sabrina the Teenage Witch, Seinfeld, and Friends.

Chinery also performed sketch comedy at ACME Comedy Theatre in Los Angeles. He was a member of ACME when the troupe appeared at the 1999 Big Stinkin' International Improv & Sketch Comedy Festival in Austin, Texas. ACME's festival show, directed by M.D. Sweeney, was performed at Esther's Pool and subsequently at the Paramount Theatre. In a 2018 interview, Chinery recalled appearing in an ACME sketch show during the weekend following the September 11 attacks.

In 1999, Chinery released his first comedy album, You Might Be A Redhead. That year, he also provided the voice of Crash Bandicoot in the video game Crash Team Racing, replacing Brendan O'Brien.

His later acting work included recurring roles in Better Off Ted, Crash & Bernstein, and Wilfred, as well as appearances in Curb Your Enthusiasm, Rules of Engagement, Anger Management, and the film Battle of the Sexes. Chinery wrote in 2010 that his character Ryan Mallory was brought back for a second appearance on Better Off Ted after an earlier guest role.

In 2008, Chinery began producing Chip's Money Tips, a series of humorous personal-finance videos and articles. He has also worked as a personal-finance adviser.

== Filmography ==
=== Film ===
Year	Title	Role	Notes
1999	Dill Scallion	Reporter	
1999	Hee/r	Buck Owens, Dr. Green	Short film
2000	The Adventures of Rocky and Bullwinkle	Security Guard	
2000	Coyote Ugly	Cop	
2000	Space Cowboys	Tom	Uncredited
2001	Pearl Harbor II: Pearlmageddo	Advisory	Short film
2002	Hip, Edgy, Sexy, Cool	Sexy Cop #1	
2002	The Country Bears	Tom Tamina	
2002	Dan Danger	Steve Markus, Mark Stephens, Pilot	
2004	The Old Man and the Studio	Security Guard	Short film
2004	Fellowship 9/11	Recruiter	Short film
2005	The Good Part	Classmate	Short film
2017	Battle of the Sexes	Roone Arledge	

=== Television ===
Year	Title	Role	Notes
1997	The Jenny McCarthy Show	Various	1 episode
1997–1999	3rd Rock from the Sun	Janitor, Guy, Workman	4 episodes
1998	Friends	Another Scientist	Episode: "The One with Phoebe's Uterus"
1998	Seinfeld	Co-Worker #1	Episode: "The Maid"
1998	Oh Yeah! Cartoons	Kid #2, Pilot, Steve (voices)	Segment: "The Dan Danger Show"
1998	The Tonight Show with Jay Leno	Various characters	1 episode
1998	Prime Time Comedy	Various characters	Television film
1999	Oh Baby	Waiter	Episode: "Birth: Part 1"
1999	The Drew Carey Show	Jerry the Bowler	Episode: "Do the Hustle"
2000	Sabrina the Teenage Witch	Newspaper Boy	Episode: "Salem's Daughter"
2000	The Wonderful World of Disney	Chip	Episode: "Mail to the Chief"
2000	Providence	Pet Store Salesman	Episode: "Family Ties"
2001	Curb Your Enthusiasm	Car Customer #1	Episode: "The Car Salesman"
2001	Dead Last	Public Defender	Episode: "He Who Smelt It"
2001	Sketch Pad	Magicop	1 episode
2002	For Your Love	Mr. Arledge	Episode: "The Sexual Evolution"
2002	Becker	Mr. Lester	Episode: "Picture Imperfect"
2002	Reba	Jeff	Episode: "Skating Away"
2003	Whoopi	Guest #1	Episode: "Pilot"
2003	All That	Officer Kropke	2 episodes
2003	Married to the Kellys	Rodney the Car Salesman	Episode: "The New Car"
2004	My Life, Inc.	Kris Kirkwood	Television film
2004	Still Standing	Gilbert's Father	Episode: "Still Winning"
2004	That '70s Show	Milkman	Episode: "You Can't Always Get What You Want"
2005	Uncommon Sense	Bellman	Television film
2005	The Commuters	Poker Champ	Television film
2006	Sons & Daughters	Co-Worker No. 1	Episode: "Surprise Party"
2006–2009	The Replacements	Mr. Kelpman, Mr. Lasley, 1950's Filmstrip Narrator (voices)	3 episodes
2007	The Suite Life of Zack & Cody	Pete	Episode: "Aptitude"
2008	My Best Friend's Girl	Customer	Television film
2008–2018	Chip's Money Tips	—N/a	31 episodes
2009–2010	Better Off Ted	Ryan	2 episodes
2011	Wilfred	Stanley	2 episodes
2013	Rules of Engagement	Randy	Episode: "Cupcake"
2013	Crash & Bernstein	Coach Urkhart	5 episodes
2013	Anger Management	Jimmy	Episode: "Charlie Does It for Science"
2014	Growing Up Fisher	Coach Gill	Episode: "Drug/Bust"
2015	The Middle	Clark	Episode: "While You Were Sleeping"
2016	Family Guy	Various voices	2 episodes
2017	Mom	Dave	Episode: "Roast Chicken and a Funny Story"
2017	Chelsea	Narrator (voice)	Episode: "Answer Me This"
2017	NCIS	NCIS Employee Rodney Spence	Episode: "House Divided"
2017	Speechless	Mr. McHugh	Episode: "W-E-- WE'RE B-A-- BACK!"
2017	American Horror Story	Leland Candoli	Episode: "Mid-Western Assassin"
2017	Brooklyn Nine-Nine	Don	Episode: "Bad Beat"
2017	Life in Pieces	Dustin	Episode: "Waffle Permission Kidless Boyfriend"
2018	New Girl	Ben	Episode: "Tuesday Meeting"
2018	I Feel Bad	Officer Young	Episode: "I Get Sick of Being Needed"
2018	The Kids Are Alright	Bob	Episode: "Behind the Counter"
2019	The Big Bang Theory	Bob	Episode: "The Propagation Proposition"
2019	Fam	Announcer (voice)	Episode: "Freddy Returns"
2019	The Goldbergs	Bruce Kaczander	Episode: "There Can Be Only One Highlander Club"
2019	Good Girls	Mattress King	Episode: "King"
2019	The Conners	Tony	Episode: "Lanford, Toilet of Sin"
2019	Shameless	Larry Seaver	Episode: "Adios Gringos"
2019	Like Magic	Announcer	Television film
2020	DreamWorks Dragons: Rescue Riders	Pirates (voice)	Episode: "King Burple"
2020	Homecoming	Attending Cop	2 episodes
2021	The Upshaws	Malcolm	Episode: "Big Plans"

=== Video games ===
Year	Title	Role	Notes
1999	Crash Team Racing	Crash Bandicoot	

== Discography ==
- You Might Be A Redhead (1999)
