= Don't Tell My Mother! =

- Genre: Comedy, Storytelling
- Date of premiere: October, 2011
- Location: Los Angeles

Creative team
- Executive Producer & Host: Nikki Levy
- Producer: Jake Webb
- Official website

Don't Tell My Mother! is a monthly live-storytelling event where writers and performers from film and television share true stories they'd never want their mothers to know. The show was co-created by the show's host, Nikki Levy, and executive producer Lizzie Czerner. The show is performed in Los Angeles, but has also been staged in New York and Chicago. The first show was in Los Angeles in October 2011. Past performers include Traci Lords, Laraine Newman, Justin Halpern, and Mary Lynn Rajskub.

== About the show ==
Don't Tell My Mother! was created in 2011 by film producer Nikki Levy and Lizzie Czerner, the artistic director of the Bang Comedy Theatre. In October 2011, they launched the first show in the lobby of the Bang Comedy Theatre, with a cast of unknown performers. The show gained in popularity, and in 2012 it was covered by The Huffington Post and the Los Angeles Times.

Levy works with comics, actors and award-winning screenwriters to share honest, funny, and poignant true stories that they wouldn't want their own mothers to know. This process allows each performer to craft their story into a 10-12 minute piece to be read on stage. Levy's mother, Judi Levy, makes frequent appearance in person or via Skype.

Don't Tell My Mother! has a podcast featuring past performers; the podcast is produced by Joe Slepski.
