= Head of the Class (2021 TV series) =

2021 American sitcom

- Genre: Sitcom
- Based on: Head of the Class by Rich Eustis; Michael Elias
- Developed by: Amy Pocha & Seth Cohen
- Starring: Isabella Gomez; Dior Goodjohn; Gavin Lewis; Adrian Matthew Escalona; Brandon Severs; Jolie Hoang-Rappaport; Jorge Diaz; Katie Beth Hall
- Music by: Tom Howe
- Country of origin: United States
- Original language: English
- No. of seasons: 1
- No. of episodes: 10

Production
- Executive producers: Amy Pocha & Seth Cohen; Bill Lawrence; Jeff Ingold; Phill Lewis; Bill Callahan
- Producers: Ken Ornstein; Randall Winston; Nora Nolan; Kip Kroeger
- Cinematography: Robin Strickland; Donald A. Morgan
- Editors: Melissa McCoy; Andy Zall
- Camera setup: Multi-camera
- Running time: 21–27 minutes
- Production companies: Doozer Productions; Warner Bros. Television

Original release
- Network: HBO Max
- Release: November 4, 2021

Related
- Head of the Class

Head of the Class is an American sitcom developed by Amy Pocha and Seth Cohen that was released on the streaming service HBO Max on November 4, 2021. It is based on Rich Eustis and Michael Elias' series of the same name that ran from 1986 to 1991. In December 2021, the series was canceled after one season.

In December 2022, the series was removed from HBO Max.

== Cast and characters ==
=== Main ===
- Isabella Gomez as Alicia Gomez, a new young teacher of the honors debate class at Meadows Creek High School bearing a similar personality to Charlie Moore, a history teacher who taught honors class at Millard Fillmore High School on the original series.
- Dior Goodjohn as Robyn Rook, captain of the debate team and secretly a gamer.
- Gavin Lewis as Luke Burrows, member of the debate team who is obsessed with business and politics.
- Adrian Matthew Escalona as Miles Alvarez, Luke's best friend and member of the debate team who likes to sing.
- Brandon Severs as Terrell Hayward, son of Darlene Merriman (Robin Givens) from the original run of Head of the Class, member of the debate team and a swimmer.
- Jolie Hoang-Rappaport as Makayla Washington, member of the debate team who is very interested in big social issues.
- Jorge Diaz as Elliot Escalante, an English teacher at Meadows Creek High School
- Katie Beth Hall as Sarah Maris, Principal Maris' daughter who is a student at Meadows Creek High School and a swimmer. She has a close friendship with Terrell. She is initially reluctant to join the debate class but eventually joins the team.

=== Recurring ===
- Christa Miller as Principal Maris, the principal at Meadows Creek High School and Sarah's mother

=== Special guest star ===
- Robin Givens as Darlene, Terrell's mother and the co-chair of the Parents Association at Meadows Creek High School. Much like her son, Darlene was an honors student herself, having been in the Individualized Honors Program at Millard Fillmore High School on the original series.

== Production ==
=== Development ===
On May 12, 2020, HBO Max gave a reboot pilot order and five additional scripts for Head of the Class. The pilot was written by Amy Pocha and Seth Cohen. On March 31, 2021, HBO Max gave the reboot a series order consisting of ten episodes. The series was developed by Amy Pocha and Seth Cohen who were expected to executive produce alongside Jeff Ingold and Bill Lawrence. Phill Lewis directed the pilot. The series was based on Michael Elias and Rich Eustis's Head of the Class. Production companies involved with the series were slated to consist of Doozer Productions and Warner Bros. Television. The series was released on November 4, 2021, with all ten episodes. On December 17, 2021, HBO Max announced that they would not be moving forward with a second season. On January 31, 2023, it was announced that the series will be released on The Roku Channel and Tubi.

=== Casting ===
In November 2020, Isabella Gomez and Jolie Hoang-Rappaport were cast in starring roles. On December 17, 2020, Gavin Lewis joined the main cast. In January 2021, Jorge Diaz, Dior Goodjohn, Brandon Severs, Adrian Matthew Escalona, and Katie Beth Hall were cast to star while Christa Miller was cast in a recurring role. On October 12, 2021, a first-look clip revealed Robin Givens reprises her role as Darlene Merriman in undisclosed capacity.

=== Filming ===
Production began in the summer of 2021 in Los Angeles.

== Episodes ==
No.	Title	Directed by	Written by	Original release date	Prod. code
1	"Pilot"	Phill Lewis	Teleplay by : Amy Pocha & Seth Cohen; Story by : Rich Eustis & Michael Elias and Amy Pocha & Seth Cohen; Based on the teleplay by : Rich Eustis & Michael Elias	November 4, 2021	U12.10001
2	"Moms Be Momming"	Phill Lewis	Amy Pocha & Seth Cohen	November 4, 2021	U13.14502
3	"As the World Sa-Turns"	Phill Lewis	Willie Hunter	November 4, 2021	U13.14503
4	"The Stare-Master"	Randall Winston	Steven Cragg & Brian Bradley	November 4, 2021	U13.14504
5	"YOLO"	Phill Lewis	Allison Bosma & Jon DeWalt	November 4, 2021	U13.14505
6	"All We Do Is Win"	Phill Lewis	Joanna Quraishi	November 4, 2021	U13.14506
7	"The Escalante Minute"	Phill Lewis	Luisa Leschin	November 4, 2021	U13.14507
8	"Beaks and Cheeks"	Phill Lewis	Allison Bosma & Jon DeWalt	November 4, 2021	U13.14508
9	"Frozen Dinner...Party"	Phill Lewis	Nora Nolan	November 4, 2021	U13.14509
10	"Three More Years"	Phill Lewis	Amy Pocha & Seth Cohen & Bill Callahan	November 4, 2021	U13.14510

== Reception ==
The review aggregator website Rotten Tomatoes reported a 67% approval rating with an average rating of 5.8/10, based on nine critic reviews. Metacritic, which uses a weighted average, assigned a score of 63 out of 100 based on five critics, indicating "generally favorable reviews".
