= Whiskey Cavalier =

American television series (2019)

- Genre: Comedy drama; Action
- Created by: David Hemingson
- Starring: Scott Foley; Lauren Cohan; Ana Ortiz; Tyler James Williams; Vir Das; Josh Hopkins
- Opening theme: "Love Me Again" by John Newman
- Composers: Harry Gregson-Williams; Tom Howe
- Country of origin: United States
- Original language: English
- No. of seasons: 1
- No. of episodes: 13

Production
- Executive producers: David Hemingson; Bill Lawrence; Jeff Ingold; Peter Atencio
- Producer: Scott Foley
- Cinematography: David Moxness; Sidney Sidell
- Editors: Nicholas Monsour; Lise Angelica Johnson; Melissa McCoy; Les Butler; Christian Hoffman
- Running time: 43–44 minutes
- Production companies: Hemingson Entertainment; Doozer; Warner Bros. Television

Original release
- Network: ABC
- Release: February 24 – May 22, 2019

Whiskey Cavalier is an American action comedy-drama television series, created by David Hemingson, that premiered on February 24, 2019. The full pilot episode debuted after the Oscars and was rebroadcast in the show’s regular time slot three nights later (February 27, 2019), on ABC. On May 12, 2019, ABC cancelled the series after one season, and the series finale aired on May 22, 2019.

== Premise ==
Whiskey Cavalier follows the "adventures of FBI agent Will Chase (codename: Whiskey Cavalier) who, following an emotional break-up, is assigned to work with CIA operative Francesca 'Frankie' Trowbridge (codename: Fiery Tribune). Together, they lead an inter-agency team of spies who periodically save the world (and each other) while navigating the rocky roads of friendship, romance and office politics".

== Cast and characters ==
=== Main ===
- Scott Foley as FBI Special Agent Will Chase, code named Whiskey Cavalier, retired Marine and an Iraq War veteran
- Lauren Cohan as CIA officer Francesca "Frankie" Trowbridge, code named Fiery Tribune
- Ana Ortiz as FBI profiler Dr. Susan Sampson
- Vir Das as CIA officer Jai Datta
- Tyler James Williams as NSA analyst Edgar Standish
- Josh Hopkins as FBI Special Agent Ray Prince

=== Recurring ===
- Dylan Walsh as Alex Ollerman
- Ophelia Lovibond as Emma Davies
- Marika Domińczyk as Martyna "Tina" Marek

=== Guest ===
- Bellamy Young as Karen Pappas (in "The Czech List")
- Joe Doyle as Paul (in "Mrs. & Mr. Trowbridge" and "Czech Mate")
- Dash Mihok as Jimmy Coleman ("special guest star" in "Spain, Trains, and Automobiles")
- Ki Hong Lee as Jung (in "College Confidential")
- Christa Miller as Kelly Ashland ("special guest star" in "Two of a Kind")
- Sung Kang as Daniel Lou ("special guest star" in "Two of a Kind")

== Episodes ==
No.	Title	Directed by	Written by	Original release date	Prod. code	U.S. viewers (millions)
1	"Pilot"	Peter Atencio	David Hemingson	February 24, 2019 (Note: The timeslot premiere was on February 27, 2019, which received 4.08 viewers and a 0.7/3 for the 18–49 rating.)	T15.10150	4.70
Following a devastating breakup with his fiancee Gigi, FBI agent Will Chase prevents a weapons deal in Paris with fellow agent Ray Price. His superior Ollerman assigns him to track Edgar Standish, an analyst wanted for hacking the NSA, to Moscow. CIA operative Frankie Trowbridge intercepts Will and Standish, but is double-crossed by her partner Dmitri. Will kills him, and he and Frankie pose as a couple to get past a checkpoint before she subdues him and drives to Nuremberg; Will then overpowers her. Standish explains that someone is after him for uncovering corrupt agents in U.S. intelligence. Frankie catches up to them, but is shot by a bounty hunter on their trail, forcing them to go to Ray for help. Will discovers Ray has been sleeping with Gigi, before Ollerman arrives and exposes himself as the traitor. Frankie distracts him with a bomb disguised as a tampon, allowing Will to kill him with a knife. The government covers up the incident with one stipulation: Frankie and Will must form a joint FBI-CIA team with Standish, Frankie's colleague Jai Datta, and FBI profiler Susan Sampson.
2	"The Czech List"	Peter Atencio	Adam Sztykiel	March 6, 2019	T13.21453	5.31
The team attempts to capture international smuggler Stavros Pappas in Vienna, only for an unknown female assassin to kill him. Frankie retrieves Pappas' eye to unlock a vault containing a valuable ledger, which also requires a retinal scan from Pappas’ widow Karen. Despite Frankie's concern that he is too emotionally vulnerable, Will tries to seduce Karen. Ray, the team’s new liaison, informs them that the assassin, Hana Novak, is also hunting Karen. Sampson confronts Standish over his tendency to lie in romantic relationships. Frankie tries to warn Will that Novak is closing in, but Will is forced to blow his cover to fight off Novak's men. Frankie argues with Will, seemingly jealous that he is genuinely attracted to Karen. After being caught off guard by Standish's deception, Sampson tells him that he lies because he doesn't believe in himself. Karen turns out to be Novak's lover; she traps Will and Frankie in the vault and destroys the ledger. The agents flood the vault to force it open. Frankie kills Novak, and Will captures Karen, who has memorized the ledger. Frankie threatens Ray for betraying Will’s trust, telling him that he will never be part of the team.
3	"When in Rome"	Peter Atencio	David Hemingson	March 13, 2019	T13.21452	3.75
In London, the team fails to rescue the Prime Minister and his wife in a training exercise. They settle into their new base of operations in an abandoned bar, where Ray informs them that their rocky first mission has jeopardized his job and the team’s continued collaboration. Frankie rejects Will’s insistence on treating the team like a family, while the untrained Standish pleads for more field experience and a gun. The team is sent to take down Italian neo-fascist group Fascia Rossa and its billionaire leader, Luca Credele, who have recruited American engineer Thomas Andrews to build a chemical bomb. In Rome, the team infiltrates a party at Credele’s villa, where Frankie is recognized by fellow assassin Marco. The team captures Andrews, who reveals Fascia Rossa has threatened his daughter Isabella. Fascia Rossa kidnaps Isabella, and Andrews is killed by Marco; Standish accidentally shoots Jai. Frankie and Will track the bomb to the sewers beneath a Saint’s Day festival, where they kill Marco and deactivate the bomb. They rescue Isabella, capturing Luca and killing his men. Back at the bar, having preserved Ray’s job and their partnership, the team toasts their success.
4	"Mrs. & Mr. Trowbridge"	Romeo Tirone	Sheri Elwood	March 20, 2019	T13.21455	3.67
The team exposes a Spanish diplomat trafficking nerve gas. However, some was already sold to exiled Romanian warlord Andrei Zimbrean. To recover it, Will and Frankie go undercover as Dan and Mary Fleming, a married couple, at the wedding of Zimbrean's daughter Iona. Jai and Standish pose as barmen to back them up, but Sampson is left behind. An assassin from Will's past tries to kill him, but he impales her on a coat hook. Frankie seduces one of Zimbrean's associates, which upsets their partnership as "Dan" is disturbed by "Mary"'s infidelity. Jai insults Edgar for his filthy living habits. Using drugged wine, the team learns that Zimbrean sent a body double to the wedding. Sampson realizes that Zimbrean is in attendance under an assumed identity; the groom, an undercover Interpol agent, lets Zimbrean escape as he cannot bring himself to harm Iona. Will and Frankie track the general to an airfield, where Frankie shoots him in the leg after Iona holds him at gunpoint. The team celebrates another victory, and Frankie finds herself growing closer to Will.
5	"The English Job"	Amanda Marsalis	Rick Muirragui	March 27, 2019	T13.21456	2.96
Will and Frankie agree to treat each other as colleagues and avoid discussing their feelings. Standish is traumatized after a near-fatal fall. Ray accompanies the team to England to investigate the death of an American diplomat, joined by MI6 officer Emma Davies. She reveals the death is connected to several burglaries of wealthy households, and Frankie and Will infiltrate the gang responsible. Ray bullies Jai by calling him dumb, as a prank with Sampson. Frankie grows suspicious of Emma, especially when she and Will are exposed as spies during a job. Will helps Standish deal with his trauma. Emma's partner Hugh Cabot turns out to be behind the robberies in a scheme to kidnap the Duke and Duchess of Sussex and overthrow the British monarchy. Standish overcomes his fear in time to disable a crucial security uplink, and Emma rescues the Duke and Duchess. Cabot reveals that he is a patsy for a secret group called the Trust, before an unseen sniper kills him. Frankie lies to Will that she values her work too much to become romantically involved. Jai pranks Ray in revenge. Emma kisses Will, which Frankie witnesses.
6	"Five Spies and a Baby"	Michael Spiller	Dean Lopata	April 3, 2019	T13.21457	3.12
On a mission to Bulgaria to intercept black market opiates, Will and Jai accidentally stumble across a ring of smugglers trafficking babies, rescuing one that they find hidden in a truck. The team embarks on an unsanctioned operation to take down the ring, and Ray obtains an old RV as a safe house. Corrupt police chief Vladimir Koslov controls the ring. Will is surprised to hear that Emma is spending more time with Ray, and Jai confesses to Standish that he does not like babies because he considers himself unfit to be a father. The smugglers track the RV, ambush Will and Frankie when they locate the baby's mother, and subdue the rest of the team, abducting the baby. Frankie tells Will that he should trust Emma and not try to contact her. Emma gives Ray a journal to write down what he wants to improve about himself, starting with fixing his friendship with Will. The team locates a Polish mercenary working for Koslov, who turns out to be undercover CIA agent Tina Marek. The team liberates Koslov's captives and takes him into custody. The baby is returned to his mother, and Tina parts with the team on good terms.
7	"Spain, Trains and Automobiles"	Matthew A. Cherry	Amy Pocha & Seth Cohen	April 10, 2019	T13.21458	3.12
The team confronts a rogue cell of Marines led by Will’s nemesis Jimmy Coleman, who escapes with a stolen plutonium core. Ray has Emma reassigned to join Will and Frankie in tracking Coleman to Spain; feeling undervalued, she declines. Will and Frankie retrieve the core, but are forced to change their extraction plan. Standish is anxious when Tina asks him out on a date, so the team bolsters his confidence with intel. Will and Frankie hole up in a house, where Emma unexpectedly arrives. Standish, following Ray’s bad advice, tries too hard to impress Tina on their date, and she leaves. After Jimmy finds the house, the team lures him to a train station. Sampson admits to Ray that in helping Standish, she was trying to work through her own failed marriage; Ray assures her that people in their line of work can still find romance. Using depleted uranium rounds, Will is able to bait Jimmy and his men into a police trap, and punches him for good measure. Sampson and Ray arrange for Standish to run into Tina in the field, and they patch things up. Frankie accepts that Will and Emma have genuine feelings for each other.
8	"Confessions of a Dangerous Mind"	Jon East	Jameel Saleem	April 17, 2019	T13.21459	2.85
On the eve of early Christmas celebrations, Standish's relationship with Tina hits a snag. A prisoner with knowledge of the Trust is scheduled for transfer; the team is shocked to learn that it's the supposedly-deceased Ollerman. The convoy is ambushed, forcing them to take Ollerman back to their operations hub, the Hive. New orders come to question him, but he uses the opportunity to divide the team by revealing their secrets, including that Frankie once requested permission to kill Will. Ray assaults Ollerman when he learns about the transfer, and Jai is told to watch him. Standish learns that there are Trust operatives within the Hive, who take Sampson hostage. Will realizes that the transfer was staged to allow Ollerman to steal a valuable piece of evidence to finance the Trust. While Jai and Standish track Sampson, Frankie pretends to defect and shoots Will. Ray stages a rescue with Jai's help using his improvisation skills. Ollerman manages to escape, but Will admits that he replaced the stolen evidence with a fake. Tina brings Standish a gift to prove she still loves him. The team celebrates by sharing Secret Santa gifts.
9	"Hearts & Minds"	Jon East	Adam Higgs	April 24, 2019	T13.21454	2.54
Frankie is upset that most of the team defers to Will's leadership rather than respect them as co-leaders. Will tries to explain to her that the key is having a warm personality, but she dismisses him as a coddler. Standish goes undercover as a client to capture organ broker Michael Kenner, but the deal goes south and Will is tasered and left behind. The team tries to catch up with the car moving him, but fail, and Michael tortures Will with electric paddles. Frankie assumes command, but quickly gets overwhelmed with responsibility and yells at the team. Through a bug planted by Jai, Will emotionally bonds with him and asks him to contact his parents if he dies. Frankie arranges for Standish to purchase Will's heart so they can find his location. Will uses adrenaline to reverse Kenner's paralytic just as Frankie and Standish locate him, while Sampson frees the broker's captives. Kenner tries to escape, but Standish sabotages his helicopter and Will knocks him out. Back at the bar, Frankie recognizes the importance of supporting her team and accepts that she has the capability to lead. Jai forces Will to "bond" with him by bugging his room.
10	"Good Will Hunting"	Romeo Tirone	Erica Batty	May 1, 2019	T13.21460	2.72
Will finds that the demands of his job make it difficult to spend time with Emma. When she is murdered during an assignment, the team takes a week off to mourn her before their next mission, which is to hunt down Henri Griffin, her suspected killer and a high-level Trust operative. Tina tells Standish that he needs to be there for Jai, while Sampson and Ray wind up having sex. The team tracks down Griffin, but when Will acts ruthless, Frankie refuses to rein him in until Sampson points out that Will might soon do something he cannot come back from. Frankie catches him torturing a witness, but chooses to let him walk instead of trying to bring him in. Ollerman lures Will into a trap by giving him Griffin's location. A wounded Griffin admits that he did not kill Emma, but before Will shoots him, Frankie talks him down by reminding him that his optimism is what makes their partnership work. Griffin tries to pull a hidden gun before being shot dead. Sampson breaks things off with Ray for good. At Tina's suggestion, the team puts up a star at their hideout to honor Emma's memory, unaware that she is the real killer.
11	"College Confidential"	Rob Bailey	Kelsey Murray & Helen Berger	May 8, 2019	T13.21462	2.43
The team goes undercover at a college to try and convince their newest target, a North Korean engineering student prodigy suspected of developing a rail gun, to defect to the United States. While trying to convince him to defect, they need to protect him from various other nations that are trying to steal his technology and kill him.
12	"Two of a Kind"	Daisy von Scherler Mayer	Ashley Darnall	May 15, 2019	T13.21461	2.54
Frankie's commitment to be being a cold hearted professional is tested when the team's new mission to take down the head of a massive drug operation reunites Frankie with former guardian from when she was a child. Meanwhile, Jai and Standish discover that Susan has been writing confidential psych evaluations on every member of the team which causes divisions in the team after the evaluations are revealed and Jai reveals his hidden lab to Standish.
13	"Czech Mate"	Peter Atencio	David Hemingson	May 22, 2019	T13.21463	3.64
In the series finale, Alex Ollerman attempts to force the team to commit a terrorist act by assassinating the Russian Defense Minister for The Trust, using Ray's life as leverage after poisoning Ray. While trying to prevent the assassination, Jai helps Standish deal with a revelation about his ex-girlfriend Tina, while Will and Frankie come to a realization about their relationship.

== Production ==
=== Development ===
On October 24, 2017, it was announced that ABC had given the production a put pilot commitment after multiple networks had shown interest. The pilot was written by David Hemingson who was expected to executive produce alongside Bill Lawrence and Jeff Ingold. Scott Foley was set to serve as a producer. Production companies involved with the pilot were slated to consist of Doozer and Warner Bros. Television. On February 16, 2018, it was announced that Peter Atencio would direct the pilot and become an executive producer. On May 11, 2018, it was announced that ABC had given the production a series order. A few days later, it was announced that the series would premiere in the spring of 2019 as a mid-season replacement.

=== Casting ===
Alongside the put pilot announcement, it was confirmed that Scott Foley would star in the series in addition to producing. In February 2018, it was announced that Lauren Cohan, Ana Ortiz, Vir Das and Tyler James Williams had joined the pilot's main cast. On August 23, 2018, it was reported that Josh Hopkins had joined the cast as a series regular after making a guest appearance in the pilot episode. On September 20, 2018, it was announced that Bellamy Young had been cast in a guest role. On December 18, 2018, it was reported that Dylan Walsh would appear in a recurring capacity. On January 25, 2019, it was announced that Foley's wife, Marika Domińczyk, and Christa Miller had joined the cast in recurring roles.

== Release ==
On May 15, 2018, ABC released the first official trailer for the series. On December 12, 2018, it was announced that the series would premiere on February 27, 2019 and air weekly on Wednesdays during the 10 PM time slot. On January 10, 2019, it was announced that the series would premiere as a special "preview" on February 24, 2019, following the 91st Academy Awards and late local newscasts before premiering in its regular timeslot three days later.

ABC did not renew Whiskey Cavalier for a second season, with the network citing declining ratings as a factor. Its distributor, Warner Bros. Television, stated that it planned to shop the series to other networks. After the announcement, a campaign to save the series emerged on social media, which Deadline Hollywood compared to a similar campaign surrounding NBC's Timeless (which was cancelled, but renewed for a second season under similar circumstances). However, delayed viewership of the final two episodes saw noticeable increases, while live viewership of the season finale was boosted by a lead-in from the ABC special Live in Front of a Studio Audience. On May 23, 2019, it was reported that ABC was "re-evaluating" a possible renewal based on these developments. However, showrunner David Hemingson stated on Twitter the next day that ABC would not reverse its decision.

=== Home media ===
In February 2025, Whiskey Cavalier is available to stream for free on Tubi.

== Reception ==
=== Ratings ===
Viewership and ratings per episode of Whiskey Cavalier
No.	Title	Air date	Rating/share (18–49)	Viewers (millions)	DVR (18–49)	DVR viewers (millions)	Total (18–49)	Total viewers (millions)
1	"Pilot"	February 24, 2019	0.8	4.70	—N/a	—N/a	—N/a	—N/a
2	"The Czech List"	March 6, 2019	0.9/4	5.31	0.8	3.79	1.7	9.11
3	"When in Rome"	March 13, 2019	0.6/3	3.75	0.8	3.61	1.4	7.36
4	"Mrs. & Mr. Trowbridge"	March 20, 2019	0.6/3	3.67	0.7	3.51	1.3	7.18
5	"The English Job"	March 27, 2019	0.5/3	2.96	0.8	3.46	1.3	6.42
6	"Five Spies and a Baby"	April 3, 2019	0.6/3	3.12	0.6	3.17	1.2	6.29
7	"Spain, Trains, and Automobiles"	April 10, 2019	0.6/3	3.12	0.6	3.04	1.2	6.16
8	"Confessions of a Dangerous Mind"	April 17, 2019	0.5/3	2.85	0.5	2.89	1.0	5.75
9	"Hearts & Minds"	April 24, 2019	0.4/2	2.54	0.6	2.81	1.0	5.35
10	"Good Will Hunting"	May 1, 2019	0.5/2	2.72	0.5	2.78	1.0	5.50
11	"College Confidential"	May 8, 2019	0.4/2	2.43	0.6	2.92	1.0	5.36
12	"Two of a Kind"	May 15, 2019	0.4/3	2.54	TBD	TBD	TBD	TBD
13	"Czech Mate"	May 22, 2019	0.7/4	3.64	TBD	TBD	TBD	TBD

=== Critical response ===
On review aggregator Rotten Tomatoes, the series holds an approval rating of 85% based on 33 reviews, with an average rating of 6.09/10. The website's critical consensus reads, "Fun, feisty, and fueled by the chemistry between its charismatic leads, Whiskey Cavalier overcomes its familiar structure to deliver an attractive take on a well-worn formula." On Metacritic, it has a weighted average score of 64 out of 100, based on 16 critics, indicating "generally favorable reviews".
