= Doozer Productions =

American television production company

Doozer Productions, Inc.
- Type: Private
- Industry: Television production
- Founded: May 26, 1998; 28 years ago
- Founder: Bill Lawrence
- Headquarters: Beverly Hills, California, United States
- Key people: Bill Lawrence (CEO & CFO); Jeff Ingold (president); Randall Winston (producer); Christa Lawrence (director)
- Products: Scrubs; Clone High; Cougar Town; Ted Lasso; Shrinking

Doozer Productions, Inc. is the production company of Bill Lawrence, best known for making Scrubs. The company's name is taken from a variant of Lawrence's middle name, Van Duzer. Its logo is depicted as a hand writing the company name, along with a boy wearing sunglasses for the double O's; he then blows a raspberry. The "bye-bye!" and raspberry in the logo were provided by Lawrence's daughter, Charlotte. It currently is under contract with Warner Bros. Television. Jeff Ingold, former head of comedy at NBC, serves as president. Randall Winston is the final head of the triumvirate, acting as a main producer on all Doozer series. Liza Katzer was promoted by Lawrence to the role of VP of development.

It was originally based at Touchstone Television, then it was shifted to NBC Studios in 2000 in order to develop its own comedy Scrubs, which came from a previous Touchstone pact, and it was reupped in 2003. After six years working at the studio, it moved back to ABC Studios in 2007, for a new overall deal, allowing projects to be developed on the air for the ABC network. After only four years working at ABC, it was moved to Warner Bros. Television, where it has been ever since.

== Productions ==
=== Television ===
Year	Title	Network	Notes
2001–10; 2026–present	Scrubs	NBC; ABC	with Seemu! Inc and 20th Television
2002–03; 2023–24	Clone High	MTV; Max	with Lord Miller Productions, Touchstone Television, Nelvana, ShadowMachine and MTV Entertainment Studios
2009–15	Cougar Town	ABC; TBS	with Coquette Productions and ABC Studios
2013–15	Ground Floor	TBS	with Warner Horizon Television
2014	Surviving Jack	Fox	with Warner Bros. Television
2014–16	Undateable	NBC	with Warner Bros. Television
2016	Rush Hour	CBS	with RatPac-Dune Entertainment, New Line Cinema and Warner Bros. Television
2018	Life Sentence	The CW	with In Good Company, CBS Television Studios and Warner Bros. Television
2019	Whiskey Cavalier	ABC	with Hemingson Entertainment and Warner Bros. Television
2020–present	Ted Lasso	Apple TV	with Ruby's Tuna Inc., Universal Television and Warner Bros. Television
2021	Head of the Class	HBO Max	with Warner Bros. Television
2023–present	Shrinking	Apple TV	with 3 Chance Productions, Corporate Mandate and Warner Bros. Television
2024–present	Bad Monkey	Apple TV	with Warner Bros. Television
2026–present	Rooster	HBO	with Two Soups Productions, Film Flam and Warner Bros. Television

=== In development ===
- Skinny Dip (with Warner Bros. Television)
- Untitled Sarah Chalke/Bill Lawrence project (with Warner Bros. Television)
