= Neil Goldman =

Neil Goldman may refer to:

- Neil Goldman, a executive producer for many hit shows including Shrinking, Scrubs and Family Guy.
- Neil Goldman, Emmy nominated writer and producer.
- Neil Goldman (Family Guy), a fictional character from Family Guy
