= Jeff Ingold =

American TV producer

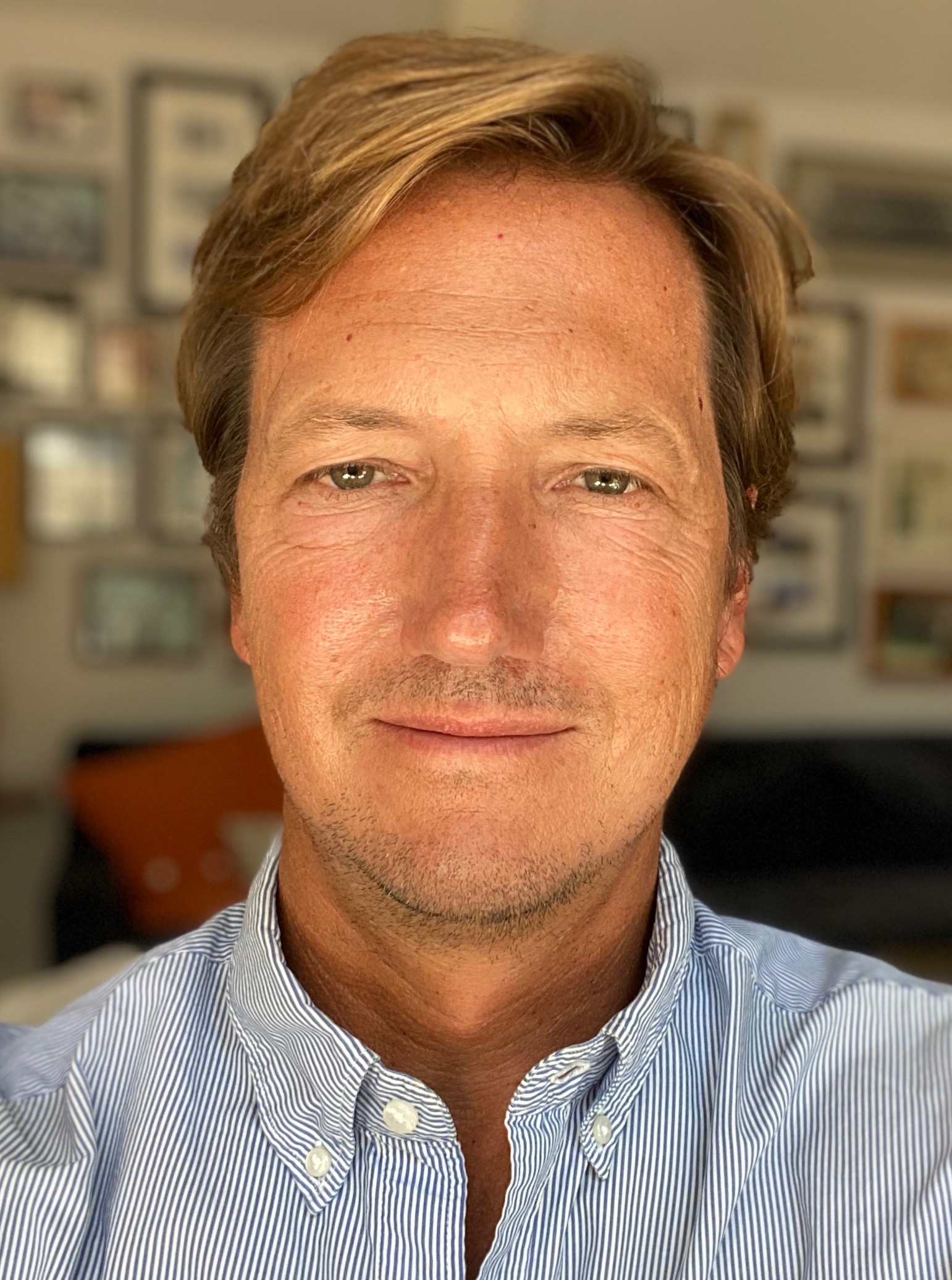
Jeff Ingold

Jeff Ingold is a two-time Emmy Award-winning American TV producer. He has worked on TV shows such as Ted Lasso, Shrinking, Scrubs, The Office, Parks and Recreation, Community, Will & Grace, Just Shoot Me!, 30 Rock, Whiskey Cavalier, Head of the Class (2021), and Bad Monkey.

He currently works with Bill Lawrence as the Head Producer and President of Lawrence's production company, Doozer.

== Early life and education ==
Jeff Ingold grew up in Birmingham, Michigan and attended Seaholm High School. Ingold graduated from Princeton University with a degree in history. He received an MBA from the USC Marshall School of Business.

== Personal life ==
Ingold resides in Los Angeles, California, with his wife Elizabeth and children Lucy and Teddy.
