= Rory Rosegarten =

American film and TV producer

Rory Rosegarten (born 1962) is an American producer, talent manager, and writer known for his work on Everybody Loves Raymond.

== Early life ==
Rory Rosegarten was born in the Bronx and moved with his family to Jackson Heights at the age of one and then to Great Neck at the age of seven. He developed an early interest in celebrities, initially as an autograph collector and then as an interviewer. For his high school newspaper, he wrote an interview column featuring known figures including Dustin Hoffman. In 1980, he studied at Arizona State University, majoring in journalism, and interviewed individuals such as Jesse Jackson, Rodney Dangerfield, and G. Gordon Liddy for The State Press.

After his freshman year, Rosegarten landed a student internship in the advertising department of Playboy, where he engaged with celebrities. He returned to college, but Playboy later contacted him to interview Robert Klein for a magazine, Spring Break, aimed at students on vacation in Florida. Rory Rosegarten opened the Conversation Company Ltd., his personal management and production company, in 1982 while still working for Playboy.

== Career ==
Rosegarten is an executive producer and talent manager who represented clients such as comedian and actor Ray Romano of Everybody Loves Raymond, author and actress Marilu Henner from the sitcom Taxi, Las Vegas entertainer Clint Holmes, and Alan Colmes, the standup comic who co-anchored the Fox News talk show Hannity & Colmes. He was nominated for an Emmy Award in 2001 for his role as an executive producer for the comedy show Everybody Loves Raymond. He won two Primetime Emmy Awards in 2003 and 2005 as Executive Producer of the Outstanding Comedy Series for Everybody Loves Raymond on CBS. Rosegarten was nominated for the Comedy Award in 2011.

In 1985, at 25, he raised all the funding and served as sole producer of Late Night Comic, a Broadway musical that opened at the Ritz Theater. Rosegarten served as an executive producer together with Ray Romano for the TNT drama pilot Men of a Certain Age. He was an executive producer for the family comedy series Everybody Loves Raymond on CBS (1996-2005). The show starred Ray Romano, Patricia Heaton, Brad Garrett, Doris Roberts, and Peter Boyle. Rosegarten will be the executive producer for the I Slept With Joey Ramone Netflix biopic of a punk rocker.
