= Hair (disambiguation) =

Hair is a protein filament that grows from follicles in the skin.

Hair may also refer to:

== Art and entertainment ==
=== Films and musicals ===
- Hair (musical), a 1967 rock musical
- Hair (film), a 1979 film adaptation of the musical
- The Hair (film), a 1974 Finnish erotic thriller

=== Television ===
- Hair (TV series), a 2014–2015 British reality series
- "Hair", a 1975 episode of Barney Miller season 1
- Hair (Entourage), an episode of the TV series Entourage
- "Hair", 1996 series episode, see list of Men Behaving Badly episodes
- "Hair", 1990 series episode, see list of Roseanne episodes
- "Hair", a 1992 episode of Rosie and Jim
- "Hair!", a 1999 episode of Rugrats
- "Hair", a season 3 episode of Servant (TV series)
- "Hair", a 1988 episode of She's the Sheriff

=== Albums ===
- Hair (Original Off-Broadway Cast Recording), 1967
- Hair (Original Broadway Cast Recording), 1968
- Hair (Original London Cast Recording), 1968
- Hair: Original Soundtrack Recording, 1979
- Hair (Stan Kenton album), 1969
- Hair (White Fence album), 2012

=== Songs ===
- "Hair" (The Lucid song)
- "Hair" (Hair song), from the musical
- "Hair" (Lady Gaga song), 2011
- "Hair" (Little Mix song), 2016
- "Hair", by Ashley Tisdale from Guilty Pleasure, 2009
- "Hair", by the Early November from The Mother, the Mechanic, and the Path, 2006
- "Hair", by PJ Harvey from Dry, 1992
- "Hair", by Stanley Clarke from 1, 2, to the Bass, 2003

== People ==
=== Surname ===
- Alex Hair (1898–1970), Scottish footballer
- Alfred Hair (1941–1970), American painter
- Ben Hair (1892–1974), Australian rules footballer
- Darrell Hair (born 1952), Australian cricket umpire
- David Hair, New Zealand writer
- George Hair (1925–1994), English professional footballer
- Graham Hair (born 1943), Australian composer, music scholar, and retired academic
- Grenville Hair (1931–1968), English footballer
- Harold Hair (1932–2025), American baseball player
- Thomas Hair (musician) (1779–1854), British violinist and Northumbrian smallpipes player
- Thomas Harrison Hair (1808–1875), British artist
- Warren Hair (1918–2006), American professional basketball player
- William Hair (fl. 1920s), Scottish footballer
- William Ivy Hair (1930–1992), American historian

=== Given name ===
- Hair Zeqiri (born 1988), Albanian professional footballer

== Other uses ==
- Head hair, a protein filament that grows from follicles in the head.
- Body hair, terminal hair that develops on the human body during and after puberty.
- Bristle, a stiff hair or feather
- Fur, hair that covers the skin of many animals
- Hair's breadth, an informal unit of very short length
- Hairy (gene), a sequence of nucleotides
- Seta, a number of different bristle- or hair-like structures on living organisms
- Trichome, a slender outgrowth on plants, algae, lichens, and certain protists
- Hair space, a thin whitespace character

== See also ==
- al-Ha'ir Prison, Riyadh, Saudi Arabia
- Hare (disambiguation)
