= Hare (disambiguation) =

The hares are a genus of mammals in the Leporidae family. Some other members of the family are also known as hares, including:

- Hispid hare, Caprolagus hispidus
- Red rock hares, genus Pronolagus
- Belgian hare, a breed of domestic rabbit

Hare may also refer to:

== People ==
- Hare (given name)
- Hare (surname), including a list of people with the name
- Hare Indians or Slavey, a Canadian First Nations aboriginal people

== Places ==
- Hare Bay (Newfoundland), Canada
- Hares Canyon, Oregon
- Hare Island, next to the port of Thoothukudi, Tamil Nadu, India
- Hare or Zayachy Island, St. Petersburg, Russia
- Hare, a hamlet in the parish of Broadway, Somerset
- Hare nome or simply "the Hare", a nome in ancient Egypt
- Hare, Texas, unincorporated community in Williamson County

== Other uses ==
- Hare baronets, three baronetcies, one of England and two of the United Kingdom
- Handley Page Hare, a British bomber aircraft retired in 1937
- Hare (hieroglyph)
- Hare (computer virus), which infected MS-DOS and Windows 95 machines in August 1996
- Hare Psychopathy Checklist, a contemporary psycho-diagnostic tool commonly used to assess psychopathy
- Hare School, one of the oldest schools (grades 1-12) in Kolkata, India
- Hare Field, a sports facility in Hillsboro, Oregon
- Hare language, a dialect of the Slavey language spoken in Canada

== See also ==
- Hair (disambiguation)
- Hare & Hare, a former landscape architecture firm in Kansas City, Missouri
- Hare Krishna (mantra)
- Hare Krishna movement, colloquial term for the International Society for Krishna Consciousness
- Hare quota, a system of voting attributed to Thomas Hare
- O'Hare (disambiguation)
- Sea hare, a small marine gastropod mollusc
