= Barney Miller season 8 =

Barney Miller
- Season 8
- No. of episodes: 22

Release
- Original network: ABC
- Original release: October 29, 1981 – May 20, 1982

Season chronology
- ← Previous; Season 7

This is a list of episodes from the eighth and final season of Barney Miller.

== Broadcast history ==
The season originally aired Thursdays at 9:00-9:30 pm (EST), except for three episodes (16, 17 and 18), which aired on Fridays at 8:30-9:00 pm (EST).

== Episodes ==
No. overall	No. in season	Title	Directed by	Written by	Original release date
149	1	"Paternity"	Danny Arnold	Nat Mauldin	October 29, 1981
A beauty contestant's purse is stolen. Wojo is served a paternity lawsuit, then shockingly learns that he's sterile.
150	2	"Advancement"	Danny Arnold	Frank Dungan & Jeff Stein	November 5, 1981
A lottery winner threatens the couple who forgot to send his form, while Luger asks Barney to find him a wife. A rift opens between Barney and Harris when Barney orders him to miss a publisher's meeting in order to make a collar.
151	3	"The Car"	Bruce Bilson	Nat Mauldin	November 12, 1981
A car thief confesses to his crime 25 years after he did it. Harris's continuing hostility to Barney actually hides a case of writer's block.
152	4	"Possession"	Bruce Bilson	Tom Reeder & Roland Kibbee	November 19, 1981
A woman attacks her husband for making her wear tight jeans. Stefan Kopechne from "Werewolf" returns, now claiming to be possessed by a demon.
153	5	"Stress Analyzer"	Bruce Bilson	Nat Mauldin	November 26, 1981
Dietrich is feared dead when his stress analyzer stops working, while a woman wants the precinct to arrest her husband's alleged mistress.
154	6	"Games"	Gennaro Montanino	Jordan Moffet	December 10, 1981
A burglary at a warehouse exposes the owner as a KGB agent, while a WAC is booked for soliciting.
155	7	"Homeless"	Lee Lochhead	Jordan Moffet, Frank Dungan & Jeff Stein	December 17, 1981
The precinct is overrun with homeless people during the holidays. Bruno Binder gets arrested for beating a vagrant with a cattle prod.
156	8	"The Tontine"	Homer Powell	Story by : Dick Wesson & Nat Mauldin; Teleplay by : Nat Mauldin	January 7, 1982
The two remaining members of a tontine decide that one should die for the other to collect. The detectives arrest a deranged CPR instructor who believes his dummy is real. Levitt brings in three witnesses for Barney to interview for Levitt's medal.
157	9	"Examination Day"	Gennaro Montanino	Jordan Moffet	January 14, 1982
The detectives don uniforms due to a shortage of foot patrolmen, who are out taking the Sgt's exam. They arrest a kosher butcher who claims a news reporter falsely accused him of selling non kosher meat. Luger brutally assaults a purse snatcher.
158	10	"The Clown"	Alan Bergmann	Sam Simon	January 21, 1982
A clown is mugged, a police recruiter throws a stag party for applicants and a corrections officer released a hundred inmates on Madison Avenue. Levitt is dismayed when the police turn him down for a medal of valor.
159	11	"Chinatown: Part 1"	Danny Arnold	Jeff Stein & Frank Dungan	February 4, 1982
A Chinese waiter is reluctant to give information about a gang killing, while Scanlon falls for a rich mugging victim.
160	12	"Chinatown: Part 2"	Danny Arnold	Jeff Stein & Frank Dungan	February 11, 1982
Harris and Dietrich continue looking after the uncooperative waiter Mr. Ling, while the mugging victim files a harassment complaint against Scanlon.
161	13	"Hunger Strike"	Tony Sheehan	Story by : Stephen Neigher & Tony Sheehan; Teleplay by : Tony Sheehan	February 18, 1982
A prisoner goes on a hunger strike, while Dietrich doubts that an elderly patient belongs in a mental hospital.
162	14	"Arrival"	Lee Lochhead	Jordan Moffet	February 25, 1982
While Luger is unhappy with his mail-order bride, a genius becomes a petty thief and a man is robbed by an old woman.
163	15	"Obituary"	Gennaro Montanino	Nat Mauldin	March 11, 1982
A man assaults the reporter who printed his obituary, while a thief is caught stealing chickens from a Government warehouse.
164	16	"Inquiry"	Gennaro Montanino	Jeff Stein & Frank Dungan	March 26, 1982
As Wojo faces a police board for shooting a thief, an angry parent assaults a nursery-school teacher and a mugging victim becomes a mugger to get out of a pay parking lot.
165	17	"Old Love"	Hal Linden	Phillip Jayson Lasker	April 2, 1982
While Dietrich's old college flame stops by, Deluca returns with an assault charge and a child actor is arrested for attacking his agent.
166	18	"Altercation"	Alan Bergmann	Tony Sheehan	April 9, 1982
Harris' enemy Ripner comes back expecting to take the rewards of Harris' latest book, while a woman is mugged in front of the station and a stockbroker is busted for drugs.
167	19	"Bones"	Max Gail	Story by : Lee H. Grant, Jordan Moffet & Nat Mauldin; Teleplay by : Jordan Moffet & Nat Mauldin	April 29, 1982
A scoutmaster nabs a mugger, while an Amerindian steals his ancestors' bones from a museum. Meanwhile, the precinct is without running water. During the repair effort, Wojo finds an antique rifle that will have a far-reaching effect on the precinct.
168	20	"Landmark: Part 1"	Tony Sheehan	Tony Sheehan	May 6, 1982
The rifle Wojo found in the previous episode is linked to Theodore Roosevelt, meaning that the 12th Precinct may be a landmark -- one that the city decides to sell for a profit. Police business goes on regardless, as a man is robbed at a bank machine, and a former hostage wishes to return to the country that held him captive.
169	21	"Landmark: Part 2"	Danny Arnold	Jeff Stein & Frank Dungan	May 13, 1982
A pair of old ladies are arrested for passing stolen credit cards. Meanwhile, the precinct is sold, and Luger avoids his fiancée.
170	22	"Landmark: Part 3"	Danny Arnold	Jeff Stein, Frank Dungan & Tony Sheehan	May 20, 1982
Friends and felons stop by to say their farewells as the 12th Precinct prepares to close its doors, and the staff gets their reassignment orders.
