= List of shipwrecks in December 1845 =

The list of shipwrecks in December 1845 includes ships sunk, foundered, wrecked, grounded, or otherwise lost during December 1845.

== 1 December ==
List of shipwrecks: 1 December 1845
Ship	State	Description
Admiral Nelson	United Kingdom	The schooner was abandoned in the North Sea off Pakefield, Suffolk. Her crew were rescued by George and Elizabeth (United Kingdom). Admiral Nelson was on a voyage from London to Newcastle upon Tyne, Northumberland.
Bertha	United Kingdom	The ship was driven ashore at Ayr. She was on a voyage from Cork to Ayr. She was later refloated and taken in to Ayr.
Button	United Kingdom	The schooner ran aground on the Foreness Rock, Margate, Kent. She was on a voyage from Newcastle upon Tyne, Northumberland to a French port. She was refloated and resumed her voyage.
Coote	British East India Company	The sloop-of-war was lost at Calicut, on the Malabar Coast, on what became known as Coote Reef (11°14′00″N 75°46′00″E). Her crew were rescued,
Farmer's Lass	United Kingdom	The schooner was driven ashore at Kingsdown, Kent. She was refloated and put in to Ramsgate, Kent.
John Barry	United Kingdom	The ship ran aground on the Cape Patrick Sands, off the coast on Glamorgan. She was on a voyage from Swansea, Glamorgan to Cork. She was refloated and put in to Porthcawl, Glamorgan.
John Esdaile	United Kingdom	The barque ran aground on the Gilstone Ledges, off the Isles of Scilly. She was towed in to Smith Sound where she was wrecked. Her crew were rescued. She was on a voyage from Greenisland, County Antrim to London.
Olive Branch	United Kingdom	The ship was wrecked at Porthcawl, Glamorgan with the loss of two of her crew. She was on a voyage from Plymouth, Devon to Newport, Monmouthshire.
Ontario	United States	The ship was wrecked at Cape Hatteras, North Carolina. Her crew were rescued.

== 2 December ==
List of shipwrecks: 2 December 1845
Ship	State	Description
Active	United Kingdom	The brig ran aground in the Carlingford Lough. She was on a voyage from Harrington, Cumberland to Dublin. She was refloated and put in to Warrenpoint, County Down.
Adriaan	Netherlands	The barque collided with another vessel and foundered in the North Sea off Texel, North Holland. Her crew were rescued by Agatha (Netherlands). Adriaan was on a voyage from Riga, Russia to Rotterdam, South Holland.
Anna and Hedda	Denmark	The ship ran aground on the Swine Bottoms. She was refloated.
Elizabeth	Stettin	The ship was driven ashore near "Cummin", near the mouth of the Dievenow. She was on a voyage from Newcastle upon Tyne, Northumberland to Stettin. She had become a wreck by 6 December.
Ellen	United Kingdom	The ship ran aground and was wrecked in the River Mersey. Her crew were rescued. She was on a voyage from Liverpool, Lancashire to Madeira.
Emilie	France	The ship was wrecked south of Cape Henry, Virginia, United States with the loss of six of her nine crew. She was on a voyage from Martinique to Norfolk, Virginia, United States.
Florist	United Kingdom	The barque was driven ashore and wrecked on Hare Island, India.
Gentina	Netherlands	The ship was lost at the mouth of the Weser. She was on a voyage from Bremen to Groningen.
Greenwell Dobinson	United Kingdom	The ship ran aground off Hunday, Orkney Islands.
Jane Morrison	(United Kingdom of Great Britain and Ireland) British North America	The full-rigged ship was wrecked on the Manicougan Shoals, in the Saint Lawrence River. Her crew were rescued. She was refloated on 22 June 1846 and towed in to Quebec City, Province of Canada.
John Bentley	United Kingdom	The ship was wrecked on the Wolverin, in the Bay of Fundy. Her crew were rescued. She was on a voyage from Bristol, Gloucestershire to Saint John, New Brunswick, British North America.
Maria	Spain	The brig was wrecked on reefs off "Mariguana Island". Her crew were rescued. She was on a voyage from Málaga to Havana, Cuba.
Montreal Packet	(United Kingdom of Great Britain and Ireland) British North America	The ship was wrecked in Torto Bay, Labrador. Her crew were rescued. She was on a voyage from Quebec City to St George's Bay.
Prince Albert	United Kingdom	The ship ran aground and was damaged at Llanelly, Glamorgan. She was on a voyage from Newcastle upon Tyne, Northumberland to an American port.
Sir Richard Jackson	United Kingdom	The full-rigged ship was wrecked on the Manicougan Shoals with the loss of a crew member. She was on a voyage from Quebec City to Liverpool.

== 3 December ==
List of shipwrecks: 3 December 1845
Ship	State	Description
Colombo	Kingdom of Sardinia	The brig was driven ashore and severely damaged at Livorno, Grand Duchy of Tuscany. She was refloated the next day.
Corncordia	United Kingdom	The ship foundered in the North Sea (54°10′N 1°48′E). Her crew were rescued.
Courier	United Kingdom	The ship was driven ashore at Livorno. She was refloated the next day.
Covenanter	United Kingdom	The ship was driven ashore and damaged on Goose Island, in the Saint Lawrence River.
Elizabeth	United Kingdom	The ship was wrecked on the Banyaard Sand, in the North Sea off the Dutch coast. She was on a voyage from Newcastle upon Tyne, Northumberland to Ghent, East Flanders, Belgium.
Henrietta Margaretta	Hamburg	The ship was abandoned in the North Sea. Her crew were rescued by Ellen (United Kingdom). Henrietta Margaretta was on a voyage from "Holbeck" to Newcastle upon Tyne.
Le Beinvenie	Netherlands	The galiot was driven ashore at Goswick, Northumberland. Her crew were rescued. She was on a voyage from Dundee, Forfarshire, United Kingdom to Antwerp, Belgium.
Prince Eugene	United Kingdom	The ship was driven ashore at Livorno. She was refloated the next day.
Queen	United Kingdom	The ship was wrecked on "Dogs Island", Newfoundland, British North America. She was on a voyage from Quebec City, Province of Canada, British North America to Liverpool, Lancashire.
Therese	Prussia	The Royal steamship was destroyed by fire at Swinemünde.

== 4 December ==
List of shipwrecks: 4 December 1845
Ship	State	Description
Amistad	France	The ship was driven ashore at Arles, Bouches-du-Rhône. Her crew were rescued. She was on a voyage from Valencia, Spain to Marseille, Bouches-du-Rhône.
Cerine	France	The ship was wrecked on the Walvisch Staart, off the coast of Zeeland, Netherlands. Her crew were rescued.
Dahlia	United Kingdom	The ship was driven ashore at Great Yarmouth, Norfolk. She was on a voyage from Whitby, Yorkshire to Southampton, Hampshire. She was refloated.
Dauntless	United Kingdom	The ship was driven ashore in the River Lune. She was refloated.
Eclipse	United Kingdom	The ship was driven ashore at Great Yarmouth. She was refloated.
Essequibo	United Kingdom	The ship was wrecked off Barbados. Her crew were rescued.
Ida	Prussia	The schooner was driven ashore near "Ellenas", Russia. She was on a voyage from Saint Petersburg to Riga.
Lunrie, or Lurric	Russia	The ship was wrecked near "Hernagood". She was on a voyage from Saint Petersburg to Riga.
Ouse	United Kingdom	The ship ran aground at Wells-next-the-Sea, Norfolk.
Sally and Susannah	United Kingdom	The ship ran aground off Felixtowe, Suffolk. She was on a voyage from Hartlepool, County Durham to Harwich, Essex. She was refloated.
Sophie Fredericke	Norway	The ship was wrecked off Bergen with the loss of all hands. She was on a voyage from Bergen to Gothenburg, Sweden.
Stefanino	Austrian Empire	The brig sprang a leak and was beached at Malta. She was on a voyage from Fiume to Falmouth, Cornwall, United Kingdom.
William and Richard	United Kingdom	The ship was in collision with Sedgefield and sank in the River Thames at Coal House Point.

== 5 December ==
List of shipwrecks: 5 December 1845
Ship	State	Description
Arethusa	United Kingdom	The barque was abandoned 20 nautical miles (37 km) north west of the Magdalen Islands, Nova Scotia, British North America. Her crew survived. She was on a voyage from Montreal, Province of Canada, British North America to Plymouth, Devon.
Bienvenu	Belgium	The ship was driven ashore at Goswick, Northumberland, United Kingdom. She was on a voyage from Dundee, Forfarshire, United Kingdom to Antwerp.
Mary and Maria	United Kingdom	The ship was driven ashore at Blakeney, Norfolk. She was on a voyage from Maidstone, Kent to Goole, Yorkshire. She was refloated the next day and resumed her voyage.
Mary Sharp	United Kingdom	The ship was driven ashore on Crane Island in the Saint Lawrence River. She was on a voyage from Quebec City, Province of Canada, British North America to Greenock, Renfrewshire. She was refloated on 28 April and put back to Quebec City.
Triton	Norway	The ship was driven ashore on Gullholm. Her crew were rescued.
Union, or Unity	United Kingdom	The schooner was driven ashore and damaged at Emmanuel Head, Lindisfarne, Northumberland. She was on a voyage from Montrose, Forfarshire to London She was refloated on 8 December and towed in to Berwick upon Tweed, Northumberland.
Universe	United Kingdom	The ship sank in the Saint Lawrence River at "Brandy Ports". Her crew were rescued.

== 6 December ==
List of shipwrecks: 6 December 1845
Ship	State	Description
Caledonia	United Kingdom	The ship was driven ashore at "L'Etang". She was on a voyage from St. Stephen, New Brunswick, British North America to Barbados. She was refloated and towed in to Eastport, Maine, where she arrived on 7 December.
Cornelia	Netherlands	The ship was driven ashore and severely damaged at List auf Sylt, Duchy of Holstein. She was on a voyage from Hartlepool, County Durham, United Kingdom to Amsterdam, North Holland.
Duart Castle	(United Kingdom of Great Britain and Ireland) British North America	The ship was wrecked on Miquelon. She was on a voyage from Prince Edward Island to Saint John, New Brunswick.
Edinburgh	United Kingdom	The ship was wrecked on the Cabanas Reef, off the coast of Florida, United States. Her crew were rescued.
Gertrude	United Kingdom	The ship was abandoned in the Indian Ocean having sprang a leak two days earlier. Her crew were rescued by a Danish barque. She was on a voyage from Liverpool, Lancashire to Calcutta, India.
Green Isle	United Kingdom	The paddle steamer ran aground on the Burbo Bank, in Liverpool Bay and was severely damaged. She was on a voyage from Liverpool, Lancashire to Waterford. She was refloated.
Isabella	United Kingdom	The ship was wrecked at Málaga, Spain.
Isabella	(United Kingdom of Great Britain and Ireland) New Zealand	The schooner was lost in the Bay of Plenty, some 70 miles (110 km) southeast of Auckland.
Neptune	Spain	The ship was wrecked at Málaga.
Papin	French Navy	The Sphinx-class aviso was wrecked on the Moroccan coast with the loss of 77 lives. She was on a voyage from Cádiz, Spain to Senegal.
Rose	(United Kingdom of Great Britain and Ireland) British North America	The ship was wrecked at Whitehaven, Province of Canada with the loss of two of her crew. She was on a voyage from Halifax, Nova Scotia to Cape Breton Island, Nova Scotia.
Six Sisters	(United Kingdom of Great Britain and Ireland) British North America	The ship was wrecked at Seal Cove, Placentia Bay. Her crew were rescued. She was on a voyage from Charlottetown, Prince Edward Island to Dublin.
William Bayard	United Kingdom	The ship was driven ashore and wrecked in the Little Matane River.

== 7 December ==
List of shipwrecks: 7 December 1845
Ship	State	Description
Calypso	(United Kingdom of Great Britain and Ireland) British North America	The ship was wrecked at Flag Cove, on the east coast of Grand Manan Island.
Campbell	(United Kingdom of Great Britain and Ireland) Jersey	The schooner foundered in the Atlantic Ocean. Five crew were rescued by Charles Hamerton (France). Campbell was on a voyage from Jersey to Rio de Janeiro, Brazil.
Margery	United Kingdom	The ship was driven ashore and sank at Emmanuel Head, Lindisfarne, Northumberland. Her crew were rescued. She was on a voyage from South Shields, County Durham to Dundee, Forfarshire.
Mic Mac	United Kingdom	The ship was driven ashore near Zarnikau, Russia. She was on a voyage from Riga, Russia to London.

== 8 December ==
List of shipwrecks: 8 December 1845
Ship	State	Description
Agnes	United Kingdom	The ship ran aground at Tampico, Mexico. She was on a voyage from Hull, Yorkshire to Havana, Cuba. She was refloated.
Cheering	United Kingdom	The schooner was wrecked on the West Hoyle Bank, in Liverpool Bay with the loss of all hands.
Frances	United Kingdom	The schooner was wrecked at Aberdovey, Merionethshire. Her crew were rescued.
Janet	United Kingdom	The ship was driven ashore at Toward Point, Argyllshire. She was refloated on 14 December and taken in to Greenock, Renfrewshire.
Pandora	United Kingdom	The ship was driven ashore and wrecked on the south coast Grand Manan, New Brunswick, British North America. Her crew were rescued. She was on a voyage from the Clyde to Saint John, New Brunswick.
Pauline	United Kingdom	The ship was driven ashore between Algeciras, Spain and Gibraltar. She was on a voyage from Newcastle upon Tyne, Northumberland to Toulon, Var, France. She was refloated on 18 December and taken in to Gibraltar.
Pellicano	Kingdom of Sardinia	The barque was driven ashore at the mouth of the Palmones. She was on a voyage from Genoa to Liverpool, Lancashire, United Kingdom. She was later refloated.
Steadfast	United Kingdom	The full-rigged ship was wrecked in the Magdalen Islands, Nova Scotia, British North America. Her crew were rescued. She was on a voyage from Quebec City, Province of Canada, British North America to Bristol, Gloucestershire.
Tartarugo	Portugal	The ship was driven ashore and wrecked on Long Island, New York, United States. She was on a voyage from Lisbon to New York City.

== 9 December ==
List of shipwrecks: 9 December 1845
Ship	State	Description
Beiram	United Kingdom	The schooner was driven ashore east of Cape Palos, Spain. She was on a voyage from Smyrna, Ottoman Empire to Cork of Falmouth, Cornwall. She had been refloated by 12 December and taken in to Cartagena, Spain, where she was condemned.
Exchange	United Kingdom	The ship ran aground on the Soper Sandbank, in the Humber at Brough, Yorkshire and sank. She was on a voyage from Great Yarmouth, Norfolk to Goole, Yorkshire. She was refloated on 14 December and beached.
Hiram	United Kingdom	The brig was wrecked on Prince Edward Island, British North America. She was on a voyage from Wallace, Nova Scotia, British North America to Cork.
Julia	United Kingdom	The ship was wrecked at San Gregorio, Uruguay. Her crew were rescued. She was on a voyage from Patagonia, Argentina to Montevideo, Uruguay.
Madonna del Carmine	Kingdom of the Two Sicilies	The ship was wrecked on Perdigal Beach, between Cape de Gatt and Almería, Spain. She was on a voyage from Oran, Algeria to Barletta.
Solicito	Kingdom of Sardinia	The ship was driven ashore and wrecked between Algeciras and Gibraltar. She was on a voyage from Genoa to Montevideo, Uruguay.

== 10 December ==
List of shipwrecks: 10 December 1845
Ship	State	Description
Baltimore	United States	The ship was driven ashore near Den Helder, North Holland, Netherlands. She was on a voyage from Odesa to Amsterdam, North Holland.
Duchesse d'Orleans	United Kingdom	The ship foundered off Salonica, Greece.
Eagle	United Kingdom	The paddle steamer was driven ashore at Oliver's Point, County Cork.
Eduard	Denmark	The ship was damaged by fire at Den Helder.
Imperial	United Kingdom	The ship was driven ashore and severely damaged at Peterhead, Aberdeenshire. She was on a voyage from Peterhead to the River Spey.
Mathilda Cornelia	Netherlands	The ship ran aground on the Slobedors. She was on a voyage from Batavia, Netherlands East Indies to Dordrecht, South Holland She was refloated on 16 December with assistance from the steamship Rijn (Netherlands) and taken in to Dordrecht.
Orient	United Kingdom	The ship ran aground on the Goodwin Sands, Kent. She was on a voyage from Newcastle upon Tyne, Northumberland to Havre de Grâce, Seine-Inférieure, France. She was refloated and resumed her voyage.
Phœnix	France	The ship was driven ashore near "Egvaag". She was on a voyage from Fredrikshavn, Denmark to Marseille, Bouches-du-Rhône. She was refloated and taken in to Egvaag in a severely damaged condition.
Saladin	United Kingdom	The ship ran aground at "Rampinge", Sweden. She was on a voyage from Memel, Prussia to Dundee, Forfarshire.

== 11 December ==
List of shipwrecks: 11 December 1845
Ship	State	Description
Ariel	United Kingdom	The ship was driven ashore at Campbeltown, Argyllshire.
Beehive	United Kingdom	The ship was driven ashore at Campbeltown.
Bellona	(United Kingdom of Great Britain and Ireland) Jersey	The brig was driven ashore and wrecked on Norderney, Kingdom of Hanover with the loss of all hands. She was on a voyage from Licata, Sicily to Hamburg.
Ebor	United Kingdom	The ship was driven ashore at Montrose, Forfarshire. She was on a voyage from Quebec City, Province of Canada, British North America to Montrose.
Emmeline	(United Kingdom of Great Britain and Ireland) British North America	The ship was wrecked on Brier Island, Nova Scotia. She was on a voyage from Trinidad to Yarmouth, Nova Scotia.
Esther	United Kingdom	The ship was driven ashore at Wainfleet, Lincolnshire. She was on a voyage from Goole, Yorkshire to Spalding, Lincolnshire.
Industry	United Kingdom	The ship was driven ashore near Ayr. She was on a voyage from Wexford to the Clyde.
Lokens	Netherlands	The ship was driven ashore on Texel, North Holland. She was on a voyage from Amsterdam, North Holland to Newcastle upon Tyne, Northumberland, United Kingdom.
Lucy	United Kingdom	The brig was driven ashore between Noordwijk and Zandvoort, North Holland. Her crew were rescued. She was on a voyage from Rotterdam, South Holland, Netherlands to Newcastle upon Tyne, Northumberland.
Manfred	United Kingdom	The brig was driven ashore and wrecked at Breaksea Point, Glamorgan. She was on a voyage from Ardrossan, Ayrshire to Malta.
Mathilde Gustava	Stettin	The ship ran aground near Domesnes, Russia. She was on a voyage from Riga, Russia to Stettin.
Mercury	United Kingdom	The schooner foundered off Bridlington, Yorkshire. Her crew were rescued. Also reported as having foundered off Great Yarmouth, Norfolk.
Mercury	United Kingdom	The brig was driven ashore north of Berwick upon Tweed, Northumberland with the loss of three of her crew.
Neptune	United Kingdom	The ship was driven ashore at Whitstable, Kent.
Olympe	France	The ship was driven ashore at Guadeloupe. She was on a voyage from Cherbourg, Seine-Inférieure to Guadeloupe.
Sarah	United Kingdom	The ship was driven ashore at Kingsgate, Kent. Her crew were rescued. She was on a voyage from Alexandria, Egypt Eyalet to Dundee, Forfarshire. She was refloated on 15 December and taken in to Margate.
Sir Walter Scott	United Kingdom	The ship was wrecked at Bras d'or, Labrador, British North America with the loss of fifteen of her eighteen crew. She was on a voyage from Quebec City to Limerick.
Sybil	United Kingdom	The schooner was driven ashore at Breaksea Point. She was on a voyage from Newport, Monmouthshire to Wexford. She was later refloated and taken in to Aberthaw, Glamorgan.
Three Sisters	United Kingdom	The ship was wrecked in the Dardanelles. Her crew were rescued. She was on a voyage from Sunderland, County Durham to Constantinople, Ottoman Empire.
Tom Bowline	United Kingdom	The paddle steamer departed from London for Bremen. Presumed foundered with the loss of all eleven people on board; a boat from the ship washed up on Norderney, Kingdom of Hanover on 18 December.
Victoria	United Kingdom	The brig was driven ashore on Ameland, Friesland, Netherlands in a capsized condition. She was on a voyage from Suza, Iran to Hamburg.
Wilhelmina	Prussia	The ship foundered in the North Sea. She was on a voyage from Hartlepool, County Durham, United Kingdom to Memel.

== 12 December ==
List of shipwrecks: 12 December 1845
Ship	State	Description
Adeline	Hamburg	The ship was driven ashore on Borkum, Kingdom of Hanover. Her crew were rescued. She was on a voyage from Hartlepool, County Durham, United Kingdom to Altona.
Agenoria	United Kingdom	The ship was driven ashore and wrecked north of Filey Bridge Yorkshire. Her crew were rescued.
Atlas	United Kingdom	The sailing barge was discovered derelict and abandoned off the Mouse Sand, in the North Sea off the coast of Essex. She was taken in to Sheerness, Kent.
Bounty	United Kingdom	The ship was driven ashore in Bootle Bay. She was on a voyage from Liverpool, Lancashire to Calcutta, India. She was refloated and resumed her voyage.
Bowditch	United Kingdom	The ship caught fire at Liverpool and was severely damaged.
British Union	United Kingdom	The ship was driven ashore and wrecked in St. George's Bay, Newfoundland, British North America with the loss of all hands.
Charlotte	Hamburg	The ship ran aground in the Vlie. She was on a voyage from Hamburg to Saint Domingo.
Ebenezer	United Kingdom	The ship collided with Para Packet (United Kingdom) and was beached at Whitstable, Kent. She was on a voyage from Sunderland, County Durham to Whitstable. She was refloated the next day and taken in to Whitstable.
Francis	United Kingdom	The ship foundered in the North Sea with the loss of all hands.
Jane	United Kingdom	The ship ran aground on the Salting Marshes, in the River Medway. She was on a voyage from Rochester, Kent to Sunderland, County Durham. She was refloated on 15 December.
Lord Eldon	United Kingdom	The barque was driven ashore and wrecked at Madras, India. Her crew survived.
Margarethe	Norway	The jacht was wrecked near "Stanhoved" with the loss of three of her crew. She was on a voyage from "Cappeln" to Christiania.
Mercury	United Kingdom	The brig was driven ashore and wrecked 2 nautical miles (3.7 km) north of Whitby, Yorkshire with the loss of three of the eight people on board. Survivors were rescued by rocket apparatus.
Nepton	United Kingdom	The ship struck the quayside at the Princes Pier, Liverpool and was damaged. She was on a voyage from Liverpool to Batavia, Netherlands East Indies.
Pursuit	United Kingdom	The ship ran aground on the Goodwin Sands, Kent. She was o a voyage from Southampton, Hampshire to Hartlepool, County Durham. She was refloated and taken in to The Downs.
Suir	United Kingdom	The ship was driven ashore and wrecked in St. George's Bay. Her crew were rescued.
Usis, or Ysis	United States	The ship was driven ashore and wrecked between Harlingen and Terschelling, Friesland, Netherlands. Her crew were rescued.
William Harrington	United Kingdom	The ship was driven ashore and wrecked in St. George's Bay. Her crew were rescued.

== 13 December ==
List of shipwrecks: 13 December 1845
Ship	State	Description
Emerald	United Kingdom	The paddle steamer was in collision with the paddle steamer John Bull (United Kingdom) in the River Thames 3 nautical miles (5.6 km) downstream of Greenhithe, Kent and was severely damaged. Some of those on board were rescued by the paddle steamer Railway (United Kingdom). Emerald was on a voyage from London Bridge to Gravesend, Kent. She was subsequently towed in to Gravesend in a wrecked condition.
Estafette	French Navy	The steamship was driven ashore at Calais. She was on a voyage from Calais to Dover, Kent.
Five Sostre	Denmark	The ship was wrecked near Uddevalla, Sweden. She was on a voyage from Newcastle upon Tyne to Copenhagen.
Hortensia	United Kingdom	The ship ran aground on the Goodwin Sands, Kent. She was on a voyage from Newcastle upon Tyne, Northumberland to Alexandria, Egypt Eyalet. She was refloated with assistance from the lugger Petre; (United Kingdom) and taken in to The Downs.
Janet Kinnear	United Kingdom	The ship was driven ashore at Helsingør, Denmark. She was on a voyage from Riga, Russia to London. She was refloated.
Lancer	United Kingdom	The abandoned brig was towed in to Corvo, Cape Verde Islands.
Neptunus	Flag unknown	The ship was driven ashore at Køge, Denmark.
Orient	United Kingdom	The ship ran aground on the Goodwin Sands. She was on a voyage from Newcastle upon Tyne to Havre de Grâce, Seine-Inférieure, France. She was refloated and resumed her voyage.
Queen of Perth	United Kingdom	The schooner capsized in the River Tyne. She was righted.
Removal	United Kingdom	The schooner sank off Bridlington, Yorkshire with the loss of all hands.
Samuel	United Kingdom	The ship ran aground on the Sunk Sank, in the North Sea off the coast of Essex and sank. Her crew were rescued. She was on a voyage from London to Selby, Yorkshire.
William	(United Kingdom of Great Britain and Ireland) British North America	The schooner was driven ashore at Point Escuminac, New Brunswick. She was refloated on 19 June 1846 and taken in to Quebec City, Province of Canada.

== 14 December ==
List of shipwrecks: 14 December 1845
Ship	State	Description
Catherina Maria	Denmark	The galeas was driven ashore in Aalbeck's Bay. Her crew were rescued.
Christian	United Kingdom	The sloop departed from Hamburg for Leith, Lothian. No further trace, presumed foundered in the North Sea with the loss of all hands.
Duke of Manchester	United Kingdom	The ship was driven ashore on the Sandwich Flats. She was on a voyage from London to Jamaica. She was refloated and taken in to The Downs. She subsequently put back to London.
Elizabeth	United Kingdom	The ship was driven ashore in the Magdalen Islands, Nova Scotia, British North America. Her crew were rescued. She was on a voyage from Quebec City, Province of Canada, British North America to the Clyde.
Gute Hoffnung	flag unknown	The ship sank off Juist, Kingdom of Hanover. Her crew were rescued. She was on a voyage from Emden, Kingdom of Hanover to Bremen.
Henriette Hellis	Prussia	The schooner was driven ashore in Aalbeck's Bay. Her crew were rescued.
Hermann	Duchy of Holstein	The yacht was driven ashore in Aalbeck's Bay. Her crew were rescued.
Letitia	United Kingdom	The sloop struck the Midland Rocks, in Jack Sound and foundered. Her crew were rescued. She was on a voyage from Caernarfon to Carmarthen.
Toninha	Portugal	The ship was driven ashore on Ameland, Friesland, Netherlands. Her crew were rescued. She was on a voyage from Hamburg to Lisbon, Portugal.
Vier Gebroders	Belgium	The ship was driven ashore near Assens, Denmark. She was on a voyage from Odense, Denmark to Antwerp. She was refloated on 16 December and taken in to Assens.
Water Witch	United Kingdom	The ship ran aground on the Red Sand, off the north Kent coast. She was on a voyage from London to Terceira Island, Azores. She was refloated and taken in to Whitstable, Kent.

== 15 December ==
List of shipwrecks: 15 December 1845
Ship	State	Description
Albion	United Kingdom	The ship was driven ashore at Ballyhack, County Waterford. She was refloated the next day.
Ann	United Kingdom	The ship foundered in the English Channel off Fairlight, Sussex. Her crew were rescued. She was on a voyage from Sunderland, County Durham to Rouen, Seine-Inférieure, France.
Belle	United Kingdom	The ship was driven ashore and wrecked on the Horse Bank, off Southport, Lancashire. Her crew were rescued. She was on a voyage from Drogheda, County Louth to Preston, Lancashire.
Britannia	United Kingdom	The ship ran aground on the Gunfleet Sand, in the North Sea off the coast of Essex. She was on a voyage from London to South Shields, County Durham. She was refloated and resumed her voyage.
Dorothy	United Kingdom	The ship ran aground on the Newcombe Sand, in the North Sea off the coast of Norfolk. She was on a voyage from Stockton-on-Tees, County Durham to London. She was refloated and put in to Great Yarmouth, Norfolk.
Elizabeth	United Kingdom	The ship ran aground and was beached at Kingstown, County Dublin.
Faderneslandet	Sweden	The ship foundered off "Refness". Her crew were rescued. She was on a voyage from Kalmar to "Westerxs".
Hulda Henrietta	Prussia	The ship was wrecked in Aalbeck's Bay. Her crew were rescued.
Industry	United Kingdom	The ship was driven ashore at Wells-next-the-Sea, Norfolk.
Johannes	Denmark	The ship was wrecked off Svinør, Norway. She was on a voyage from "Arreskjobing" to Copenhagen.
Johannes Ulrica	Netherlands	The ship was driven ashore on Norderney, Kingdom of Hanover. Her crew were rescued. She was on a voyage from Amsterdam, North Holland to Hamburg.
Lark	United Kingdom	The ship capsized and was abandoned. Her crew were rescued. she was on a voyage from Alexandria, Egypt to Saint John, New Brunswick, British North America.
Oregon	United Kingdom	The ship was driven ashore at Bideford, Devon. She was on a voyage from Cardiff, Glamorgan to Naples, Kingdom of the Two Sicilies. She was refloated but was driven ashore again and severely damaged. Oregon was refloated on 18 December and taken in to Bideford.
Rose	United States	The ship issued a message in a bottle stating that she was sinking in the Atlantic Ocean (46°36′N 16°00′W). She was on a voyage from New York to Lisbon, Portugal. Presumed subsequently foundered with the loss of all hands.
Royal Charlie	United Kingdom	The ship was driven ashore 16 nautical miles (30 km) south of Ayr. She was on a voyage from Lisbon, Portugal to Glasgow, Renfrewshire.
Titus	Flag unknown	The ship ran aground off Margate Kent, United Kingdom. She was on a voyage from Riga, Russia to Algiers, Algeria. She was refloated and put in to Ramsgate, Kent.

== 16 December ==
List of shipwrecks: 16 December 1845
Ship	State	Description
Alexandria	Lübeck	The ship was driven ashore at Kastrup, Denmark. She was on a voyage from Riga, Russia to Bordeaux, Gironde, France. She was refloated and taken in to Copenhagen.
Betty	Bremen	The galiot was wrecked on the Tegeler Sand, in the North Sea. She was on a voyage from Bremen to London, United Kingdom.
Bruce	United Kingdom	The ship was driven ashore on Spurn Point, Yorkshire. She was refloated on 29 December and taken in to Hull, Yorkshire.
Diligentia	Prussia	The ship was driven ashore and sank at Helsingør, Denmark. Her crew were rescued. She was on a voyage from Flekkefjord, Norway to Swinemünde.
Duncombe	United Kingdom	The ship was driven ashore and wrecked on "Rune Island". Her crew were rescued. She wason a voyage from Riga, Russia to London.
Hend Catharine	Denmark	The ship ran aground off Blokhus and was wrecked. Her crew were rescued.
Laura	United Kingdom	The ship ran aground on the West Plaat, off the Dutch Coast. She was on a voyage from Hull to Rotterdam, South Holland, Netherlands. She was refloated on 30 January 1846 and taken in to Rotterdam.
Liliput	Prussia	The ship was driven ashore and wrecked at Memel. She was on a voyage from Pillau to Memel.
Nereid	United Kingdom	The ship ran aground at Bunt Head. She was on a voyage from Middlesbrough, Yorkshire to Exeter, Devon. She was refloated.
Paul Friedrich Auguste	France	The steamship was driven ashore near "Callandborg", Belgium. Her crew were rescued. She was on a voyage from Paris to Bremen.
Royal Charlie	United Kingdom	The ship was driven ashore 16 nautical miles (30 km) south of Ayr. She was on a voyage from Glasgow, Renfrewshire to Lisbon, Portugal.
Sprightly	United Kingdom	The ship departed from Gijón, Spain for Portsmouth, Hampshire. No further trace, presumed foundered with the loss of all hands.
Wasdale	United Kingdom	The ship was driven ashore at Whitehaven, Cumberland. Her crew were rescued. She was on a voyage from London to Whitehaven. She was refloated on 26 December.

== 17 December ==
List of shipwrecks: 17 December 1845
Ship	State	Description
Bellona	Hamburg	The ship was wrecked on Norderney, Kingdom of Hanover. She was on a voyage from Licata, Sicily to Hamburg.
Clarinda	United Kingdom	The ship ran aground on the Burbo Bank, in Liverpool Bay and was damaged. She was on a voyage from Newport, Monmouthshire to Liverpool, Lancashire. She was refloated and taken in to Liverpool in a leaky condition.
Eclipse	United Kingdom	The paddle steamer ran aground off Wexford. She was on a voyage from Waterford to Wexford.
Juno	Danzig	The ship struck the wreck of Lady Faversham (United Kingdom) at South Shields, County Durham, United Kingdom and was beached. She was on a voyage from Danzig to South Shields.
Percival Foster	United Kingdom	The ship ran aground on the Barber Sand, in the North Sea off the coast of Norfolk. She was on a voyage from Hartlepool, County Durham to Rochefort, Charente-Maritime, France. She was refloated.
Pilot	United Kingdom	The ship was driven ashore at Port Talbot, Glamorgan. She was refloated and taken in to Port Talbot.

== 18 December ==
List of shipwrecks: 18 December 1845
Ship	State	Description
Allison	United Kingdom	The ship was driven ashore and severely damaged near the Kronberg Battery, Helsingør, Denmark. She was refloated on 22 December and taken in to Helsingør for repairs.
Danske Eeg	Denmark	The ship was Borkum, Kingdom of Hanover. Her crew were rescued. She was on a voyage from Hamburg to Gothenburg, Sweden.
Frankland	United Kingdom	The barque was driven ashore and wrecked at Cemaes Bay, Anglesey. Her crew were rescued. She was on a voyage from Bahia, Brazil to Liverpool, Lancashire.
Gem	United Kingdom	The ship was driven ashore south of Helsingør. She was on a voyage from Saint Petersburg, Russia to London. She was refloated and taken in to Helsingør for repairs.
Idea	United Kingdom	The brig was wrecked on the Haisborough Sands, in the North Sea off the coast of Norfolk. Her crew were rescued.
Loyalty	United Kingdom	The brig was driven ashore south of Sunderland, County Durham. She was refloated on 29 December and towed in to Sunderland.
Pandora	United Kingdom	The brig foundered in the Irish Sea off the Isle of Man.
Rabbit	United Kingdom	The sloop was driven ashore at Newport, Pembrokeshire. She was on a voyage from Fishguard, Pembrokeshire to Cardigan.
Rachael	United Kingdom	The ship struck the pier and sank at Folkestone, Kent.

== 19 December ==
List of shipwrecks: 19 December 1845
Ship	State	Description
Albion	United Kingdom	The brigantine was wrecked at Bideford, Devon with the loss of all, or all but one, of her crew.
Chester	United Kingdom	The flat foundered in the Irish Sea off Great Orme Head, Caernarfonshire. Her crew were rescued. She was on a voyage from Chester, Cheshire to Caernarvon.
Christian Frederick	Denmark	The ship was wrecked near "Grenaae". Her crew were rescued. She was on a voyage from Corsoer to Porsgrunn, Norway.
Corsair	United Kingdom	The ship ran aground near Blankenese. She was on a voyage from Hamburg to Plymouth, Devon. She was refloated on 21 December and resumed her voyage.
Dora	United Kingdom	The barque foundered in the Irish Sea off Strumble Head, Pembrokeshire with the loss of all on board, about 30 to 40 people.
Henry Holland	United Kingdom	The ship was driven ashore at Heckness Point, Orkney Islands. She was on a voyage from Riga, Russia to Londonderry.
Laura	United Kingdom	The ship was driven ashore on Voorne, South Holland, Netherlands. She was on a voyage from Hull, Yorkshire to Rotterdam, South Holland.
Mary Henney	United Kingdom	The ship was driven ashore on Islay, Inner Hebrides.
Najaden	Sweden	The ship was wrecked on the Skagen Reef with the loss of ten of her 14 crew. She was on a voyage from Stockholm to London, United Kingdom.
Princess Caroline Amelia	Hamburg	The ship was driven ashore near Blankenese. She was on a voyage from Hamburg to Havana, Cuba. She was refloated on 21 December and resumed her voyage.
Saxon	United Kingdom	The ship was wrecked on St. George's Shoal, off the American coast. She was on a voyage from Boston, Massachusetts, United States to London.
Wilhelmine	Hamburg	The ship ran aground near Blankenese. She was on a voyage from Hamburg to Liverpool, Lancashire, United Kingdom. She was refloated on 21 December and resumed her voyage.
William and Ann	United Kingdom	The brig was driven ashore and wrecked at Millook, Cornwall with the loss of seven of her nine crew. She was on a voyage from Swansea, Glamorgan to London.
Woodman	United Kingdom	The East Indiaman was wrecked on the Kentish Knock. All on board were rescued. She was on a voyage from Bombay, India to London.

== 20 December ==
List of shipwrecks: 20 December 1845
Ship	State	Description
Cossack	United Kingdom	The flat was driven ashore in Abergele Bay.
Fanny	(United Kingdom of Great Britain and Ireland) Royal Yacht Squadron	The yacht was wrecked at Bideford, Devon with the loss of all hands.
Fanny	France	The whaler was driven ashore at Kororareka, New Zealand. She was refloated.
Henriette	Danzig	The ship ran aground in Kalkbrenner Bay. She was on a voyage from Danzig to Newport, Monmouthshire, United Kingdom. She was refloated and resumed her voyage.
Henry	United Kingdom	The ship was driven ashore at Heckness, Orkney Islands. She was on a voyage from Riga, Russia to Londonderry.
Howard	United Kingdom	The ship foundered in the Irish Sea off Fishguard, Pembrokeshire, United Kingdom.
Margaret and Mary	United Kingdom	The ship was driven ashore and wrecked 4 nautical miles (7.4 km) east of Cardigan with the loss of all but one of her crew.
Pomona	United Kingdom	The ship was driven ashore at Porthmullen, Isles of Scilly. She was on a voyage from London to Clifden, County Galway.
Porto Novo	Portugal	The ship ran aground on the Owers Sandbank, in the English Channel off the coast of Sussex, United Kingdom. She was on a voyage from Terceira Island, Azores to London, United Kingdom. She was refloated and taken in to Littlehampton, Sussex.
Raven	United Kingdom	The flat was driven ashore in Abergele Bay.
Richard	United Kingdom	The schooner foundered in Abergele Bay. Her crew were rescued.
Rock	United Kingdom	The flat was driven ashore in Abergele Bay.
Sir Henry Pottinger	United Kingdom	The barque was driven ashore in Whole Cove, on Grand Manan Island, Nova Scotia, British North America. She was on a voyage from Quebec City, Province of Canada, British North America to Bristol, Gloucestershire. She was later refloated and towed in to Saint John's, Newfoundland.
St. Andrew	United Kingdom	The ship was wrecked on Machias Seal Island, in the Gulf of Maine. She was on a voyage from Hull, Yorkshire to Saint John, New Brunswick, British North America.
St. Winifred	United Kingdom	The flat was driven ashore in Abergele Bay.
Supply	United Kingdom	The flat was driven ashore in Abergele Bay.
Swift	United Kingdom	The sloop was driven ashore at Sunderland, County Durham. Her crew were rescued. She was refloated on 30 December and taken in to Sunderland.
Victory	United Kingdom	The sloop was driven ashore and wrecked at Cardigan. Her crew were rescued by the Cardigan Lifeboat.
Young Eagle	United Kingdom	The ship foundered off New Quay, Cornwall with the loss of all six crew.

== 21 December ==
List of shipwrecks: 21 December 1845
Ship	State	Description
Commerce	United Kingdom	The brig foundered in the North Sea off Redcar, Yorkshire with the loss of all hands. She was on a voyage from the River Tees to Dundee, Forfarshire.
Earl of Newburgh	United Kingdom	The ship ran aground on the Newcombe Sand, in the North Sea off the coast of Suffolk. She was refloated and resumed her voyage.
Hull Packet	United Kingdom	The ship was driven ashore and wrecked at Wainfleet, Lincolnshire.
Jean	United Kingdom	The ship was wrecked on North Ronaldsay, Orkney Islands. Her crew were rescued.
Kate, or Kate Nickelby	United Kingdom	The West Indiaman capsized and sank at Waterford with the loss of at least six of her crew.
Lady Frances	United Kingdom	The ship was driven ashore at Humberstone, Lincolnshire. Her crew were rescued.
New Fleece	United Kingdom	The ship was driven ashore at Wainfleet.
Raisdeck	United Kingdom	The ship was driven ashore near North Somercotes, Lincolnshire. Her crew were rescued.
Ramier	France	The ship was driven ashore at Honfleur, Calvados. She was on a voyage from Port-au-Prince, Haiti to Havre de Grâce, Seine-Inférieure.
Robert Carder	United Kingdom	The schooner was driven ashore near North Somercotes. Her crew were rescued.
Sarah	United Kingdom	The ship was wrecked on Little Saltee, County Wexford. Her crew were rescued.
Welcome	United Kingdom	The ship was wrecked on Little Saltee, County Wexford. Her crew were rescued.
Young Adam	United Kingdom	The brig was wrecked on the Knock Sand, in the North Sea off the coast of Lincolnshire with the loss of all seven crew. She was on a voyage from Middlesbrough, Yorkshire to Wisbech, Cambridgeshire.

== 22 December ==
List of shipwrecks: 22 December 1845
Ship	State	Description
Æolus	United Kingdom	The ship was in collision with Young Queen and was abandoned in the Irish Sea off Holyhead, Anglesey with the loss of all but two of her crew. Æolus was on a voyage from Liverpool, Lancashire to the Azores. She was towed in to Caernarfon later that day.
Albrecht and Otto	Hamburg	The schooner was in collision with the brig Swea (Hamburg) and sank in the North Sea off the Galloper Sand. All twelve people on board were rescued by Swea. Albrecht and Otto was on a voyage from Hamburg to Tenerife, Canary Islands.
Creole	United Kingdom	The ship was driven ashore at Ryde, Isle of Wight. She was on a voyage from London to Dominica. She was later refloated.
Eliza	United Kingdom	The ship was driven ashore at Maryport, Cumberland. She was refloated on 24 December and taken in to Maryport.
Eliza	United Kingdom	The brig was driven ashore at Dunnet Head, Caithness. Her crew were rescued. She was on a voyage from Crinan, Argyll to Sunderland, County Durham.
Freiheiden	Netherlands	The ship ran aground in Sullom Voe, Shetland Islands, United Kingdom and was damaged.
Isabella	United Kingdom	The ship was driven ashore and wrecked at Dunnet Head. Her crew survived. She was on a voyage from Loch Crean to Sunderland.
Kate	United Kingdom	The smack collided with Harmony (United Kingdom and was abandoned in the Bristol Channel off Lundy Island, Devon.
Lively	United Kingdom	The ship ran ashore at Cley-next-the-Sea, Norfolk. She was on a voyage from Newcastle upon Tyne, Northumberland to Cley-next-the-Sea. She was later refloated.
Margaret and Mary	United Kingdom	The ship was wrecked at Aberporth, Cardiganshire with the loss of all but one of her crew.
Mary Ann	United Kingdom	The collier, a brig, was driven ashore and wrecked at Boscastle, Cornwall with the loss of all but one or two of her crew. She was on a voyage from Swansea, Glamorgan to London.
Spirito Santo	Kingdom of Sardinia	The ship caught fire at Genoa and was scuttled. Her crew were rescued. She was on a voyage from Marseille, Bouches-du-Rhône, France to Genoa. Spirito Santo was subsequently wrecked.
Susan	United Kingdom	The ship foundered in Carnarvon Bay with the loss of all eight crew. She was on a voyage from Glasgow, Renfrewshire to the Charente.
Triton or Tutor	United Kingdom	The ship was driven ashore and scuttled at Maryport. She was on a voyage from Belfast, County Antrim to Maryport. She was refloated on 26 December.
Tvende Sostre	Denmark	The ship was driven ashore at Bjornsund, Norway. She was on a voyage from "Munsen" to Ålesund.
Unicorn	United Kingdom	The ship foundered in the North Sea 120 nautical miles (220 km) east south east of Flamborough Head, Yorkshire. Her crew were rescued.
Union	United Kingdom	The brig was abandoned in the North Sea 75 nautical miles (139 km) or 120 nautical miles (220 km) east south east of Spurn Point, Yorkshire. Her crew were rescued by Shepherd (United Kingdom). Union was on a voyage from Hamburg to South Shields, County Durham.

== 23 December ==
List of shipwrecks: December 1845
Ship	State	Description
Albion	United Kingdom	The ship, a brigantine or schooner, was wrecked at Bideford, Devon with the loss of all hands.
Ashley	United Kingdom	The schooner ran aground on the Heaps, in the North Sea off the coast of Essex. Her crew were rescued by the fishing smack Cobold (United Kingdom). Ashley was later refloated with the assistance of five smacks and was taken in to Harwich, Essex.
Bethel	United Kingdom	The ship was driven ashore at Wainfleet, Lincolnshire.
Bruce	United Kingdom	The ship was driven ashore at Spurn Point, Yorkshire. She was refloated on 29 December and taken in to Hull.
Dorothy	United Kingdom	The brig was driven ashore at St. Ives, Cornwall. Her nine crew were rescued. She was on a voyage from Newport, Monmouthshire to Goole, Yorkshire.
Dr. Winterbottom	United Kingdom	The ship was driven ashore at Saint-Valery-en-Caux, Seine-Inférieure, France. Her crew were rescued. She was on a voyage from Newcastle upon Tyne, Northumberland to Honfleur, Calvados, France.
Emilie	United Kingdom	The ship was driven ashore at Lytham St. Annes, Lancashire. She was on a voyage from Liverpool, Lancashire to Africa.
Ernst	Stettin	The ship ran aground off Frederikshavn, Denmark. She was on a voyage from Amsterdam, North Holland to Stettin.
Four Sisters	United Kingdom	The ship was driven ashore south of Katwijk, North Holland, Netherlands. Her crew were rescued. She was on a voyage from Amsterdam to London.
Gefion	Sweden	The ship was driven ashore on Terschelling, Friesland, Netherlands. She was refloated.
George	(United Kingdom of Great Britain and Ireland) Jersey	The ship was wrecked at Sitio de Calahonda, Spain. She was on a voyage from Gibraltar to Málaga, Spain.
Gothenburgs Walgang	Sweden	The ship was driven ashore and wrecked near "Brunsken". She was on a voyage from Newcastle upon Tyne to Gothenburg.
Jacoba Maria	Netherlands	The ship was driven ashore near "Fredericksort". She was on a voyage from Flensburg, Duchy of Holstein to Amsterdam, North Holland.
Jessie	United Kingdom	The ship was driven ashore. She was on a voyage from Newburgh, Fife to Sunderland, County Durham. She was refloated on 26 December and taken in to Hull.
James Peacock	United Kingdom	The ship was driven ashore and wrecked in Tramore Bay. She was on a voyage from Ayr to Ballina, County Mayo.
John Crosby	United Kingdom	The ship ran aground on the Parten Shoal, off the coast of Anglesey. She was refloated on 29 December.
Kate	United Kingdom	The ship was wrecked near Belmullet, County Mayo.
Lord Lynedoch	United Kingdom	The barque was abandoned in the Atlantic Ocean. Her 32 crew were rescued by Cambridge (United Kingdom). Lord Lynedoch was on a voyage from Saint John, New Brunswick, British North America to London.
Louisa	United Kingdom	The sloop was wrecked at Cardigan. Her crew were rescued. She was on a voyage from the Clyde to Gibraltar, then Messina, Sicily and Malta. She was subsequently repaired and returned to service. She was refloated on 28 December.
Ness	United Kingdom	The West Indiaman was driven ashore and wrecked at Bideford. Her crew were rescued. She was on a voyage from Demerara, British Guiana to Bristol, Gloucestershire.
Oscar	Sweden	The ship was driven ashore and wrecked at Lowestoft, Suffolk. United Kingdom. She was on a voyage from Gothenburg to London.
Spartan	United Kingdom	The ship was driven ashore at Terranova di Sicilia, Sicily.
Wendland	United Kingdom	The ship was driven ashore at Ryde, Isle of Wight.
Winterbottom	United Kingdom	The ship was driven ashore near Saint-Valery-en-Caux, Seine-Inférieure, France. Her crew were rescued. She was on a voyage from Newcastle upon Tyne, Northumberland to Honfleur, Calvados, France.

== 24 December ==
List of shipwrecks: 24 December 1845
Ship	State	Description
Fair Acadian	United Kingdom	The ship was driven ashore in Angle Bay. She was on a voyage from Newport, Monmouthshire to Valparaíso, Chile.
Favourite	United Kingdom	The ship struck the Piana Bank, in the Mediterranean Sea off the coast of the Grand Duchy of Tuscany and foundered.
Frederick and Betsey	United Kingdom	The ship was driven ashore at Theddlethorpe, Lincolnshire.
Jane	United Kingdom	The ship was driven ashore in Robin Hoods Bay. Her crew were rescued. She had become a wreck by 30 December.
Lorentz	Hamburg	The ship was driven ashore at Altenbrück, Duchy of Schleswig. She was on a voyage from Africa to Hamburg.
Marquis of Douglad	(United Kingdom of Great Britain and Ireland) Isle of Man	The ship ran aground and was severely damaged at Derbyhaven. She was on a voyage from Carlisle, Cumberland to Douglas. She was refloated and taken in to Douglas.
Sir William Wallace	United Kingdom	The ship was driven ashore at Barcelona, Spain. She was on a voyage from Newcastle upon Tyne, Northumberland to Barcelona. She was refloated on 24 January 1846 and taken in to Barcelona for repairs.
Spartan	Kingdom of the Two Sicilies	The ship was driven ashore at Terranova di Sicilia.
Trenton	United States	The ship was driven ashore north of Pass-á-l'Outre, Louisiana. She was on a voyage from Rio de Janeiro, Brazil to New Orleans, Louisiana. She was later refloated and taken in to New Orleans.
Vrow Gelie	Belgium	The ship was driven ashore near Fort Frederic Henri. She was on a voyage from Odesa to Antwerp.
Wanderer	United Kingdom	The ship was driven ashore at Fishguard, Pembrokeshire. She was on a voyage from the Clyde to Waterford.
W. S. R.	United Kingdom	The sloop was driven ashore at Brancaster, Norfolk. She was refloated on 28 December.

== 25 December ==
List of shipwrecks: 25 December 1845
Ship	State	Description
Ceylon	United Kingdom	The ship was driven ashore at Bic, Province of Canada, British North America. She was on a voyage from Quebec City, Province of Canada to Liverpool, Lancashire.
Diomedes	Rostock	The ship was driven ashore at Höganäs, Sweden. She was on a voyage from Leith, Lothian, United Kingdom to Rostock.
Dorothy	United Kingdom	The ship was driven ashore and wrecked at St. Ives, Cornwall. Her crew were rescued. She was on a voyage from Newport, Monmouthshire to Goole, Yorkshire.
Eliza	United Kingdom	The ship was driven ashore and wrecked west of Dungeness, Kent with the loss of all hands. She was on a voyage from North Shields, County Durham to Honfleur, Calvados, France.
Elizabeth	United Kingdom	The ship was driven ashore and wrecked west of Dungeness with the loss of all hands. She was on a voyage from Sunderland, County Durham to Rouen, Seine-Inférieure, France.
Ellen	United Kingdom	The ship ran aground at Wells-next-the-Sea, Norfolk.
Euphemia	United Kingdom	The ship ran aground near Sunderland. She was on a voyage from Dundee, Forfarshire to London. She was refloated and resumed her voyage. f
Montague	United Kingdom	The ship foundered in the English Channel off Calais, France with the loss of all eight crew. She was on a voyage from Newcastle upon Tyne, Northumberland to Honfleur.
Richard	Denmark	The ship foundered in the North Sea off Cromer, Norfolk with the loss of all nine crew.
Silurian	United Kingdom	The ship was driven ashore and damaged at Cardiff, Glamorgan. She was on a voyage from Newport to Hull, East Riding of Yorkshire. She was refloated and put back to Newport.
Sophia	United Kingdom	The schooner ran aground and was damaged off the mouth of the Ebro. She was on a voyage from Tarragona, Spain to London. She was later refloated and taken in to Tarragona for repairs.
Syria	United Kingdom	The ship was driven ashore in the Saint Lawrence River.

== 26 December ==
List of shipwrecks: 26 December 1845
Ship	State	Description
Amity	United Kingdom	The sloop was abandoned in the North Sea off the coast of Northumberland. Her crew were rescued by Venus (United Kingdom). She was on a voyage from Newcastle upon Tyne, Northumberland to the Firth of Forth. Amity was reboarded the next day and towed in to Warkworth, Northumberland by Ellen Brown (United Kingdom).
Ann	United Kingdom	The ship was driven ashore at Bude, Cornwall with the loss of all but three of her crew. She was on a voyage from Portreath, Cornwall to Swansea, Glamorgan.
Arta or Artis	United Kingdom	The ship was driven ashore in the Sea of Marmora. She was on a voyage from the Danube to an English port. She was refloated on 29 December and put in to Constantinople, Ottoman Empire.
Cicero	United Kingdom	The ship ran aground on the Cockle Sand, in the North Sea off the coast of Norfolk. She was refloated and resumed her voyage.
Dove	United Kingdom	The ship was driven ashore and wrecked at Pipton Point, Pembrokeshire. Her crew were rescued. She was on a voyage from Newport, Monmouthshire to Youghal, County Cork.
Five Soskende	Denmark	The ship was driven ashore near Fyns Hoved. Her crew were rescued. She was on a voyage from Svendborg to Odesa.
Moscow	United States	The ship was abandoned in the Atlantic Ocean. Her crew were rescued by Atchafalya (Spain). Moscow was on a voyage from Charleston, South Carolina to Genoa, Kingdom of Sardinia.
Plough	United Kingdom	The brig struck the pier and was beached at Ramsgate, Kent. She was on a voyage from Sunderland, County Durham to a Mediterranean port.
Royal William	United Kingdom	The ship was damaged by fire at Hull, Yorkshire.
William Wallis	United Kingdom	The ship was driven ashore and wrecked at Barcelona, Spain. SHe was on a voyage from Newcastle upon Tyne, Northumberland to Barcelona.

== 27 December ==
List of shipwrecks: 27 December 1846
Ship	State	Description
Anna Maria	Hamburg	The ship ran aground and was wrecked off "Wych". Her crew were rescued. She was on a voyage from Hamburg to Antwerp, Belgium.
Anne	United Kingdom	The schooner was wrecked off St. Ives, Cornwall with the loss of a crew member. She was on a voyage from Devoran, Cornwall to Swansea, Glamorgan.
Dorothea	United Kingdom	The brig was wrecked at Hayle, Cornwall. Her nine crew were rescued by the Hayle pilot boats. She was on a voyage from Newport, Monmouthshire to Goole, Yorkshire.
Hectorina	United Kingdom	The ship was driven ashore at Formby, Lancashire with the loss of a crew member. She was on a voyage from Dromore, County Down to Liverpool, Lancashire.
Patriot	United Kingdom	The ship was wrecked at Oristano, Sardinia with the loss of two of her crew. She was on a voyage from Malta to Toulon, Var, France.
Robert	United Kingdom	The ship sprang a leak and was abandoned in the North Sea. Her crew were rescued by Adelphi (United Kingdom). Robert was on a voyage from Poole, Dorset to South Shields, County Durham. She was subsequently discovered by Undaunted (United Kingdom), which towed her in to Bridlington, Yorkshire, where she arrived on 29 December.
Traveller	United Kingdom	The ship was driven ashore near Carteret, Manche, France. She was on a voyage from Liverpool, Lancashire to Ipswich, Suffolk.

== 28 December ==
List of shipwrecks: 28 December 1845
Ship	State	Description
Aurora	Grand Duchy of Oldenburg	The schooner collided with Thorwaldsen (Denmark) and capsized in the English Channel off Beachy Head, Sussex, United Kingdom with the loss of a crew member. She was on a voyage from Riga to Bordeaux, Gironde, France. The wreck came ashore near Calais, France, on 5 January.
Duchesse d'Orleans	France	The ship foundered off Havre de Grâce, Seine-Inférieure. She was on a voyage from Marseille, Bouches-du-Rhône to Cette, Hérault and Havre de Grâce.
Eliza	United Kingdom	The brig was wrecked in Rye Bay with the loss of all hands.
Harmony	Sweden	The ship was driven ashore and wrecked west of Boulogne, Pas-de-Calais, France with the loss of a crew member. She was on a voyage from Lisbon, Portugal to Gothenburg.
Lark	United States	The ship was abandoned in the Atlantic Ocean. Her crew were rescued. She was on a voyage from Alexandria, District of Columbia to Saint John, New Brunswick, British North America.
Peggy	United Kingdom	The full-rigged ship ran aground at Lindisfarne, Northumberland. She was refloated.
Renovation	United Kingdom	The brig capsized and was severely damaged at North Shields, County Durham.
Sarah and Mary	United Kingdom	The ship was holed by her anchor and sank at Beaumaris, Anglesey. She was refloated and beached for repairs.
Twee Cornelissen	Netherlands	The East Indiaman was driven ashore and wrecked near Pevensey, Sussex, United Kingdom with the loss of a passenger. Ten survivors were rescued by the Eastbourne Lifeboat. She was on a voyage from Batavia, Netherlands East Indies to Amsterdam, North Holland.

== 29 December ==
List of shipwrecks: 29 December 1845
Ship	State	Description
Betty	Russia	The ship was driven ashore in Cranfield Bay. She was on a voyage from Riga to Warrenpoint, County Antrim, United Kingdom. She was refloated.
Borderer	United Kingdom	The barque ran aground on the Goodwin Sands, Kent. She was on a voyage from South Shields, County Durham to Aden. She was refloated and anchored in The Downs.
Esther and Jane	United Kingdom	The ship foundered in the Irish Sea off the Point of Ayre, Isle of Man. Her crew were rescued.
Finish	United Kingdom	The ship was driven ashore and severely damaged at North Sunderland, County Durham.
Finish	United Kingdom	The schooner was driven ashore and severely damaged at Sunderland, County Durham.
Frances Western	United Kingdom	The ship was driven ashore 2 nautical miles (3.7 km) from Rye, Sussex. Her crew were rescued. She was on a voyage from Fécamp, Pas-de-Calais, France to Warkworth, Northumberland. She was refloated on 15 January and taken in to Rye.
Margaret	United Kingdom	The ship was driven ashore and severely damaged north of Peterhead, Aberdeenshire. She was on a voyage from Newcastle upon Tyne, Northumberland to Port Gordon, Morayshire. She was refloated and taken in to Peterhead.
Marina	France	The ship sank off Messina, Sicily. She was on a voyage from Constantinople, Ottoman Empire to Marseille, Bouches-du-Rhône.
New Union	United Kingdom	The ship ran aground and was wrecked on the North Bank, in the Irish Sea. Her crew survived. She was on a voyage from Maryport, Cumberland to Dumfries.
Norton	United Kingdom	The brig was driven ashore at Portsmouth, Hampshire.
Pioneer	United States	The ship ran aground on the Long Sand, in the North Sea off the coast of Essex, United Kingdom. She was refloated.
Sainte Maria	France	The ship sank in the Mediterranean Sea. Her crew were rescued. She was on a voyage from Constantinople, Ottoman Empire to Marseille, Bouches-du-Rhône.
Sarah	United Kingdom	The ship was wrecked near Bideford, Devon. Her crew were rescued. She was on a voyage from Penzance, Cornwall to Swansea, Glamorgan.

== 30 December ==
List of shipwrecks: 30 December 1845
Ship	State	Description
Alhambra Packet	United States	The ship was beached at Holyhead, Anglesey, United Kingdom. Her crew survived. She was on a voyage from Liverpool, Lancashire, United Kingdom to Savannah, Georgia.
Amanda	Lübeck	The ship was driven ashore on the east coast of Öland, Sweden.
Betty	Russia	The ship was driven ashore in Cranfield Bay.
Brilliant	(United Kingdom of Great Britain and Ireland) Jersey	The abandoned sloop was driven ashore at Surtainville, Manche, France.
Expedit	Sweden	The ship ran aground off Strömstad. She was on a voyage from Stockholm to Hull, Yorkshire, United Kingdom.
Jane	United Kingdom	The ship was driven ashore and damaged at Portaferry, County Down. She was refloated the next day.
Margaret and Jane	United Kingdom	The schooner was abandoned in the North Sea off Berwick upon Tweed, Northumberland and subsequently sank. Her crew were rescued by Venus (United Kingdom). Jane and Margaret was on a voyage from Hartlepool, County Durham to Grangemouth, Stirlingshire.
John	United Kingdom	The ship collided with Kilby (United Kingdom and sank in the Irish Sea off the Calf of Man, Isle of Man with the loss of two of her crew. She was on a voyage from Liverpool to Drogheda, County Louth.
Rapid	United Kingdom	The ship was driven ashore at Dymchurch, Kent. She was on a voyage from London to Jamaica. She was refloated and taken in to The Downs.
Richard	United Kingdom	The ship was wrecked in the Hilbre Islands, Cheshire. Her crew were rescued. She was on a voyage from Llanddulas, Caernarfonshire to Liverpool.
Roberth Hawkes	United Kingdom	The steam tug was run into by a barque and sank in the River Thames at Gravesend, Kent. Her crew were rescued.
Sarah	United Kingdom	The ship was driven ashore and wrecked at Down End, north of Bideford, Devon. Her crew were rescued. She was on a voyage from St. Ives, Cornwall to Swansea, Glamorgan.
Success	United Kingdom	The ship was in collision with a brig off Happisburgh, Norfolk and was abandoned. Her crew were rescued by HMRC Victoria ( Board of Customs). She was subsequently wrecked on the Scroby Sands. Success was on a voyage from London to Goole, Yorkshire.
Surprise	United Kingdom	The ship foundered in the River Severn 8 nautical miles (15 km) downstream of Chepstow, Monmouthshire with the loss of all three of her crew.
Westmorland	United Kingdom	The ship was driven ashore near Ravenglass, Cumberland. She was on a voyage from Liverpool, Lancashire to Bahia, Brazil. She was refloated on 1 January and taken in to Ravenglass. She was subsequently towed to Whitehaven, Cumberland for repairs.
William IV	United Kingdom	The brig was wrecked near Clifden, County Galway with the loss of two of her crew. She was on a voyage from Kilrush, County Clare to London. Two wreckers were killed when a mast fell on them.

== 31 December ==
List of shipwrecks: 31 December 1846
Ship	State	Description
Æolus	United Kingdom	The ship was abandoned in the North Sea off Flamborough Head, East Riding of Yorkshire. Her crew were rescued by John and Isabella (United Kingdom). Æolus was on a voyage from Ramsgate, Kent to Newcastle upon Tyne, Northumberland.
Fanny	United Kingdom	The ship was driven ashore at Porthcawl, Glamorgan. Her crew were rescued.
Harmonie	Denmark	The ship was driven ashore near "Vaterland". She was on a voyage from London, United Kingdom to Fredrikstad. Harmonie was refloated on 2 January 1846 but three crew were drowned when their boat capsized.
Hoffnung	Hamburg	The ship foundered in the Zuyder Zee off Workum, Friesland, Netherlands. Her crew were rescued. She was on a voyage from Amsterdam, North Holland, Netherlands to Hamburg.
John George	United Kingdom	The smack ran aground on the Cut Sand, in the Bristol Channel and capsized with the loss of four lives.
Margaret Thomson	United Kingdom	The ship was driven ashore at Sheringham, Norfolk. She was on a voyage from London to Middlesbrough, Yorkshire. She was refloated and taken in to Great Yarmouth, Norfolk.
Mary	United Kingdom	The ship was driven ashore at Skegness, Lincolnshire. She was on a voyage from Great Yarmouth to Burntisland, Fife. She was refloated and taken in to Wainfleet, Lincolnshire.
Merchantman	United Kingdom	The ship was driven ashore and wrecked at Ness Point, Suffolk. Her crew were rescued. She was on a voyage from Swinefleet, Yorkshire to London.
Norge	Norway	The ship was driven ashore and wrecked at the mouth of the Agger Canal, Denmark with the loss of a crew member. She was on a voyage from London to Skien.
Siebe Brouwer	Netherlands	The ship was driven ashore on Ameland, Friesland. She was on a voyage from Amsterdam to Livorno, Grand Duchy of Tuscany.
Suffren	France	The barque was wrecked at Port Natal, Natal.
Susan	United Kingdom	The ship capsized at Newport, Monmouthshire. She was righted.
Wilhelmina	Netherlands	The ship struck a sunken wreck and sank in the English Channel off Boulogne-sur-Mer, Pas-de-Calais, France. Her crew were rescued by Antonius (Belgium). Wilhelmina was on a voyage from Rotterdam, South Holland to Liverpool, Lancashire, United Kingdom.

== Unknown date ==
List of shipwrecks: Unknown date in December 1845
Ship	State	Description
Alcibiade	Grand Duchy of Tuscany	The ship was driven ashore near Ardenza. Her crew were rescued. She was on a voyage from Livorno to Marseille, Bouches-du-Rhône, France.
Alcion	France	The ship was abandoned in the North Sea before 5 December. Her crew were rescued by a Dutch pilot boat. She was on a voyage from Newcastle upon Tyne, Northumberland to Saint-Malo, Ille-et-Vilaine.
Amandus	Norway	The ship was wrecked at sea before 11 December. She was on a voyage from "Holbeck" to Christiania.
Assomption	France	The ship was driven ashore and wrecked near "Fort Antignano". Her crew were rescued. She was on a voyage from Marseille to Bastia, Corsica.
Barbadoes	United Kingdom	The ship was abandoned in the Atlantic Ocean before 3 December.
Bertha	Prussia	The ship was driven ashore and damaged near Trelleborg, Sweden. She was on a voyage from Königsberg to London, United Kingdom. She was refloated and put in to Copenhagen, Denmark, where she arrived on 19 December in a leaky condition.
Bristol (ship)	United Kingdom	The ship was wrecked on Fogo Island, Cape Verde Islands before 25 December. Her crew were rescued. She was on a voyage from London to Bombay, India.
Camilla	United Kingdom	The ship was driven ashore in the Red Sea before 8 December. She was refloated and put in to Bombay for repairs.
Duc Amici	Grand Duchy of Tuscany	The ship was driven ashore at the Marzocco Tower, Livorno. She was on a voyage from Tripoli, Eyalet of Tripolitania to Livorno.
Elizabeth	United Kingdom	The brig was wrecked at Dungeness, Kent with the loss of all hands. She was on a voyage from Sunderland, County Durham to Rouen, Seine-Inférieure, France.
Ellen	United Kingdom	The brig was wrecked on the Colorados, off the coast of Cuba before 2 December. Her crew were rescued. She was on a voyage from Jamaica to St. Stephen, New Brunswick, British North America.
Emily	United Kingdom	The ship was abandoned in the North Sea before 28 December. She was towed into Warkworth, Northumberland on that date.
Fair Play	United Kingdom	The ship was wrecked on the coast of Newfoundland, British North America. She was on a voyage from Wallace, Nova Scotia to Liverpool, Lancashire.
Francis Romulus	United Kingdom	The ship was wrecked at Tetuan, Beylik of Tunis before 17 December. She was on a voyage from Liverpool to Malta and Alexandria, Egypt.
Granite	United Kingdom	The brigantine was abandoned in the Atlantic Ocean before 23 December.
Holland	Flag unknown	The ship was driven ashore at Longhope, Orkney Islands. She was refloated on 26 December and taken in to Stromness, Orkney Islands.
Isabelle	Spain	The brigantine was wrecked at Málaga between 5 and 10 December.
James Peacock	United Kingdom	The ship was driven ashore and wrecked in Tramore Bay. She was on a voyage from Ayr to Ballina, County Mayo.
Jane	United Kingdom	The ship was driven ashore in the Saint Lawrence River at Saint-André, Province of Canada, British North America before 18 December.
Jane Charlotte	(United Kingdom of Great Britain and Ireland) British North America	The schooner was abandoned in the Atlantic Ocean before 21 December.
Laurel	United Kingdom	The ship was driven ashore and wrecked on Green Island, in the Saint Lawrence River before 18 December. She was raised and taken in to Quebec City on 14 July 1846.
Lee	United Kingdom	The barque was driven ashore and wrecked near Cabo de Santa Maria, Portugal.
Maria	United Kingdom	The ship was driven ashore in the Saint Lawrence River at L'Isle-aux-Coudres, Province of Canada before 18 December.
Maria	United Kingdom	The schooner ran aground on the Heaps Sandbank, in the North Sea off the coast of Essex and was abandoned by her crew.
Mary	United Kingdom	The ship was wrecked at Arichat, Nova Scotia, British North America before 26 December.
Mersey	United Kingdom	The ship ran aground on Sombuers Key. She was on a voyage from New Orleans, Louisiana, United States to Trieste. She was refloated and taken in to Key West, Florida, United States, where she arrived on 4 December.
Miss Douglas	(United Kingdom of Great Britain and Ireland) Isle of Man	The ship was driven ashore and severely damaged near Douglas before 24 December. She was refloated and taken in to Douglas.
Montreal	United Kingdom	The barque was wrecked at Cape Chat, Province of Canada before 20 December with the loss of all on board. She was on a voyage from Quebec City, Province of Canada to London.
Plymouth	United Kingdom	The schooner ran aground on The Shingles, off the Isle of Wight. She was refloated on 17 December.
Pomona	United Kingdom	The brig ran aground on the Heaps Sandbank and was abandoned by her crew.
Providence	United Kingdom	The ship foundered off Cape St. Vincent, Portugal. Her crew were rescued by St. Thomas (Denmark).
Rubicon	United Kingdom	The ship ran aground on the Domesnes Reef. She was on a voyage from Riga, Russia to Hull, Yorkshire. She was refloated on 3 December and was assisted in to Ventava, Courland Governorate.
Sir Robert Peel	United Kingdom	The ship was driven ashore in the Saint Lawrence River at Kamourska, Province of Canada before 18 December.
Sophia Maria	Flag unknown	The ship was driven ashore and severely damaged at Llanelly, Glamorgan. She was refloated on 16 December.
St. Andrew	United Kingdom	The ship was driven ashore at East Machias, Maine, United States.
St. David	United Kingdom	The steamship was presumed to have foundered in the English Channel before 30 December with the loss of all on board, about 40 people. She was on a voyage from Havre de Grâce, Seine-Inférieure, France to Plymouth, Devon and Liverpool. The body of an engineer was recovered by the steamship Transit (United Kingdom).
Tartar	United Kingdom	The ship was wrecked in the "Bottler River", Mauritius before 17 December. Her crew were rescued by Manchester (United Kingdom).
Trial	United Kingdom	The schooner foundered in the North Sea 6 nautical miles (11 km) north north west of Wells-next-the-Sea, Norfolk before 28 December.
Undine	United Kingdom	The ship foundered off the coast of Brittany France before 7 December.
Victor	United Kingdom	The ship ran aground off Tortuga before 27 December and was damaged. She was on a voyage from the West Indies to Norfolk, Virginia, United States. She was refloated and resumed her voyage.
William Bayard	United Kingdom	The full-rigged ship was wrecked near Cape Chat. Her crew were rescued. She was on a voyage from Quebec City to Liverpool.
William Lloyd	United Kingdom	The ship was wrecked in the Magdalen Islands, Nova Scotia.
