= Hare (given name) =

Hare is a given name. It is a Māori transliteration of the name Harry. Notable people with the name include:

- Hare Hongi, pen name of Henry Matthew Stowell (1859–1944), New Zealand language interpreter and genealogist
- Hare Pomare (died 1864), New Zealand Māori and son of Pōmare II
- Hare Te Rangi (born 1977), New Zealand rugby league footballer

== See also ==
- Hare (disambiguation)
- Hare (surname)
