= Barney Miller season 6 =

Barney Miller
- Season 6
- No. of episodes: 22

Release
- Original network: ABC
- Original release: September 13, 1979 – May 8, 1980

Season chronology
- ← Previous; Season 5 Next → Season 7

This is a list of episodes from the sixth season of Barney Miller.

== Broadcast history ==
The season originally aired Thursdays at 9:00-9:30 pm (EST).

== Episodes ==
No. overall	No. in season	Title	Directed by	Written by	Original release date
105	1	"Inquisition"	Noam Pitlik	Story by : Calvin Kelly & Jim Tisdale; Teleplay by : Tony Sheehan	September 13, 1979
Lt. Scanlon of Internal Affairs shows up at the station to find the anonymous letter writer who claims to be gay, while a concerned citizen (Peter Jurasik) attacks the source of subliminal commercial advertising. In the DVD release, and in broadcast on Antenna TV, the term "Muzak" is muted out whenever said by one of the characters during this episode.
106	2	"The Photographer"	Noam Pitlik	Bob Colleary	September 20, 1979
Wojo arrests a man with a literal messianic complex, while a gallant thief steals a woman's purse.
107	3	"Vacation"	Noam Pitlik	Frank Dungan & Jeff Stein	September 27, 1979
A series of false alarms implies that a sniper is after a cop, but the station is preoccupied with vacation schedules and the case of a man who refuses to donate a kidney to his brother.
108	4	"The Brother"	Noam Pitlik	Shelley Zellman & Wally Dalton	October 4, 1979
A monk comes to the station to notify the disappearance of a novice, while Dietrich dresses in drag to catch muggers.
109	5	"The Slave"	Noam Pitlik	Frank Dungan & Jeff Stein	October 18, 1979
A Burmese national arrested for a traffic accident turns out to be a slave to a fellow countryman who's part of the Burmese embassy.
110	6	"Strip Joint"	Noam Pitlik	Jaie Brashar, Frank Dungan & Jeff Stein	November 1, 1979
A man says he'll die of spontaneous combustion, while a strip joint disrupts a bookstore's peace and quiet.
111	7	"The Bird"	Noam Pitlik	Story by : Richard W. Beban, Judith Anne Nielsen, Frank Dungan & Jeff Stein; Teleplay by : Frank Dungan & Jeff Stein	November 8, 1979
Wojo mourns his parrot's death, while a suicide hotline operator finally cracks and Harris needs everyone's signed release to get his police fiction novel published.
112	8	"The Desk"	Noam Pitlik	Frank Dungan & Jeff Stein	November 22, 1979
A thief has become a virtual zombie as a result of an amygdalotomy, while religious morals prevent an Amish robbery victim from calling home. The episode title "The Desk" refers to a subplot that was moved to the following episode during the rewrite process.
113	9	"The Judge"	Noam Pitlik	Frank Dungan, Jeff Stein & Tony Sheehan	December 6, 1979
Wojo arrests a judge who attacked a lawyer with a gavel; a soap-opera fan is unable to distinguish between fact and fiction; Nick's old desk is removed from the squadroom.
114	10	"The DNA Story"	Noam Pitlik	Story by : Rich Reinhart & Jaie Brasher; Teleplay by : Rich Reinhart	December 13, 1979
A woman believes her husband has been replaced by a clone, while a potentially infected strain of DNA is stolen from a lab.
115	11	"The Dentist"	Noam Pitlik	Frank Dungan & Jeff Stein	December 27, 1979
A dentist is accused of molesting his patients while under anesthesia, while a musician with an unusual instrument is brought in for disturbing the peace.
116	12	"People's Court"	Noam Pitlik	Frank Dungan & Jeff Stein	January 3, 1980
A group of vigilantes are brought into the station for imprisoning a thief, while a census-taker is booked for breaking into a house just to count heads.
117	13	"Vanished: Part 1"	Noam Pitlik	Tony Sheehan & Frank Dungan & Jeff Stein	January 10, 1980
Harris vanishes when he goes undercover at a skid-row mission, and a woman has some unusual ideas about how to begin a single-parent family.
118	14	"Vanished: Part 2"	Noam Pitlik	Tony Sheehan & Frank Dungan & Jeff Stein	January 17, 1980
Harris is still missing, while Luger gets demoted to captain.
119	15	"The Child Stealers"	Noam Pitlik	Frank Dungan & Jeff Stein	January 24, 1980
Marty and his partner Mr. Driscoll are back when Mr. Driscoll is charged with attempting to kidnap his son, while another man claims to be from the future and Officer Zitelli makes a startling public admission.
120	16	"Guns"	Noam Pitlik	Rich Reinhart, Frank Dungan, Jeff Stein & Tony Sheehan	January 31, 1980
A thief's using a dueling pistol leads to the uncovering of both the theft of a huge weapons collection and former-Inspector Luger's possible intentions, while a man steals back his TV from Police Property.
121	17	"Uniform Days"	Noam Pitlik	Richard Beban & Judith Neilsen	February 7, 1980
Harris shows up to the station on Uniform Day in street clothes and balks at exchanging them for a uniform, resulting in harsh words between him and Barney.
122	18	"Dietrich's Arrest: Part 1"	Noam Pitlik	Tony Sheehan & Frank Dungan & Jeff Stein	February 28, 1980
Against regulations, Dietrich joins an anti-nuclear protest, while Barney is unable to afford his condo-converted apartment and a lottery winner tries to give away all of his prize money in an unusual fashion.
123	19	"Dietrich's Arrest: Part 2"	Noam Pitlik	Tony Sheehan & Frank Dungan & Jeff Stein	March 6, 1980
Dietrich is arrested at the protest, Harris is tasked the job of booking him, and Lt. Scanlon of Internal Affairs is loving the whole ordeal.
124	20	"The Architect"	Noam Pitlik	Story by : Calvin Kelly & Jim Tisdale; Teleplay by : Frank Dungan, Jeff Stein & Tony Sheehan	March 27, 1980
An architect arrested for vandalizing a building he originally designed claims to have planted bombs in the building. Two thugs hold the squad hostage to free their boss. Dietrich balks at being on restricted duty, as a result of his recent arrest, and Harris worries about his vacation plans being ruined.
125	21	"The Inventor"	Noam Pitlik	Tony Sheehan & Frank Dungan & Jeff Stein	May 1, 1980
An inventor is busted for stealing his own ideas from a company safe, while Wojo is hypnotized into remembering details about the robbery he witnessed and in the process revealing his true feelings about his fellow detectives.
126	22	"Fog"	Noam Pitlik	Story by : Mark Brull; Teleplay by : Frank Dungan, Jeff Stein & Tony Sheehan	May 8, 1980
While Barney copes with his third failed chance at promotion to Deputy Inspector, a trumpeter is booked for assault and another man is arrested for vandalism.
