= Barney Miller season 4 =

Barney Miller
- Season 4
- No. of episodes: 23

Release
- Original network: ABC
- Original release: September 15, 1977 – May 18, 1978

Season chronology
- ← Previous; Season 3 Next → Season 5

This is a list of episodes from the fourth season of Barney Miller.

== Broadcast history ==
The season originally aired Thursdays at 9:00-9:30 pm (EST).

== Episodes ==
| No. overall | No. in season | Title | Directed by | Written by | Original release date |
|---|---|---|---|---|---|
| 58 | 1 | "Goodbye, Mr. Fish: Part 1" | Danny Arnold | Reinhold Weege & Danny Arnold | September 15, 1977 |
It's Fish's retirement day, but he hasn't shown up.
| 59 | 2 | "Goodbye, Mr. Fish: Part 2" | Danny Arnold | Reinhold Weege | September 22, 1977 |
Fish has finally arrived, but doesn't seem to know or realize that it's his retirement day..
| 60 | 3 | "Bugs" | David Swift | Larry Balmagia, Dennis Koenig & Tony Sheehan | September 29, 1977 |
An exterminator comes to the squad room to kill roaches, but the bugs he finds are electronic.
| 61 | 4 | "Corporation" | Hal Linden | Story by : Lee H. Grant; Teleplay by : Lee H. Grant, Tony Sheehan & Danny Arnold | October 6, 1977 |
An environmentalist is accused of vandalizing a chemical company.
| 62 | 5 | "Burial" | Danny Arnold | Michael Russnow | October 13, 1977 |
A grieving man steals his dead friend's corpse and refuses to tell where he has buried him; it's up to a visiting Fish to find out.
| 63 | 6 | "Copy Cat" | Jeremiah Morris | Douglas Wyman & Tony Sheehan | October 27, 1977 |
Someone is committing crimes as seen on TV programs and fifth time's the charm for Wojo, but he finds that the more things change the more things stay the same.
| 64 | 7 | "Blizzard" | Danny Arnold | Tony Sheehan | November 3, 1977 |
During a blizzard, a suspect has a fatal heart attack at the snowbound 12th Precinct and his attorney (the unpopular Arnold Ripner) naturally wants to sue the department.
| 65 | 8 | "Chase" | Jeremiah Morris | Tom Reeder, Danny Arnold & Reinhold Weege | November 17, 1977 |
A drug dealer who attempts to bribe the detectives turns out to be an Internal Affairs officer sent to investigate the squad, and Wojo commandeers a taxi for a high-speed chase. Lt. Scanlon makes his first appearance as an Internal Affairs officer
| 66 | 9 | "Thanksgiving Story" | David Swift | Reinhold Weege | November 24, 1977 |
Mental patients have escaped from a private hospital and are loose in an automat. Also, a man is arrested for stabbing his brother-in-law during dinner.
| 67 | 10 | "Tunnel" | David Swift | Story by : Michael Russnow; Teleplay by : Michael Russnow & Tony Sheehan | December 1, 1977 |
While chasing a burglar, Wojo ends up buried alive in the robber's tunnel to a diamond exchange.
| 68 | 11 | "Atomic Bomb" | Noam Pitlik | Reinhold Weege & Tom Reeder | December 15, 1977 |
The bomb squad and the Federal authorities are called in to disarm a nuclear device made by a student.
| 69 | 12 | "The Bank" | Noam Pitlik | Tony Sheehan | January 5, 1978 |
A man causes trouble at a sperm bank when his deposit is allowed to "go bad".
| 70 | 13 | "The Ghost" | Lee Bernhardi | Reinhold Weege | January 12, 1978 |
A man's ghost story is met with skepticism by the detectives until strange things start happening in the squadroom.
| 71 | 14 | "Appendicitis" | Noam Pitlik | Tony Sheehan | January 19, 1978 |
Yemena has appendicitis, while a pastry thief is revealed to be a sugar addict.
| 72 | 15 | "Rape" | Noam Pitlik | Dennis Koenig | January 26, 1978 |
A woman accuses her husband of rape, while a master of disguise holds up everything in sight.
| 73 | 16 | "Eviction: Part 1" | Noam Pitlik | Story by : Tom Reeder; Teleplay by : Tony Sheehan & Tom Reeder | February 2, 1978 |
Barney is ordered to have the residents of a condemned hotel evicted; when he refuses to use force, he is suspended.
| 74 | 17 | "Eviction: Part 2" | Noam Pitlik | Reinhold Weege & Tom Reeder | February 9, 1978 |
Since Barney has refused to evict the residents of a condemned hotel, the police are prepared to do it themselves, while a plainclothes man runs the squad.
| 75 | 18 | "Wojo's Problem" | Max Gail | Tony Sheehan | February 23, 1978 |
The detectives get a female colleague, Det. 3rd Grade Roslyn Licori (introduced as Chano’s replacement), who has a jealous husband; Wojo brings his bedroom problems to work; and a shoplifter using a wheelchair does a runner on Nick. (Note: First of three appearances of Det. Licori)
| 76 | 19 | "Quo Vadis?" | Alex March | Story by : Douglas Wyman & Tony Sheehan; Teleplay by : Tony Sheehan | March 2, 1978 |
A woman thinks a local art gallery is full of smut and therefore wants it closed down...but what is her real reason? (Note: Jack Soo does not appear in this episode.)
| 77 | 20 | "Hostage" | Hal Linden | Story by : Chris Hayward & Reinhold Weege; Teleplay by : Reinhold Weege | March 23, 1978 |
A criminal whose brother has smuggled a gun into the squadroom holds the detectives hostage and demands money and a getaway plane. (Note: Jack Soo does not appear in this episode. Second of three appearances of Det. Licori)
| 78 | 21 | "Evaluation" | Noam Pitlik | Larry Balmagia | May 4, 1978 |
A numerologist refuses to give his name, while husband-and-wife porn shop owners are harassed by their children. (Note: Jack Soo does not appear in this episode. Third and final appearance of Det. Licori.)
| 79 | 22 | "The Sighting" | Alex March | Story by : Reinhold Weege & Carol Gary; Teleplay by : Tony Sheehan | May 11, 1978 |
Wojo claims to have seen a UFO. (Note: Jack Soo does not appear in this episode.)
| 80 | 23 | "Inauguration" | Alex March | Reinhold Weege & Carol Gary | May 18, 1978 |
On the day of Ed Koch's inauguration as mayor, Harris is offered a job on the mayor's security team. First appearance of Officer Zatelli. (Note: Jack Soo does not appear in this episode.)
