= Barney Miller season 7 =

Barney Miller
- Season 7
- No. of episodes: 22

Release
- Original network: ABC
- Original release: October 30, 1980 – May 21, 1981

Season chronology
- ← Previous; Season 6 Next → Season 8

This is a list of episodes from the seventh season of Barney Miller.

== Broadcast history ==
The season originally aired Thursdays at 9:00–9:30 pm (EST).

== Episodes ==
No. overall	No. in season	Title	Directed by	Written by	Original release date
127	1	"Homicide: Part 1"	Noam Pitlik	Jeff Stein & Frank Dungan	October 30, 1980
New Department regulations force the squad to specialize in homicides. New cases include a man who murdered his barber, a series of dismembered bodies and a woman who's put a hit out on her husband.
128	2	"Homicide: Part 2"	Noam Pitlik	Jeff Stein & Frank Dungan	November 6, 1980
The guys look for the man whose wife has made him a target for murder and the precinct gets a new photographer, but the squad's new specialization has sad and fatal consequences.
129	3	"The Delegate"	Noam Pitlik	Jim Tisdale	November 13, 1980
A vagrant claims to be from the 1976 Democratic National Convention, while Harris deals with a series of thefts and a new officer may be too good to be true.
130	4	"Dorsey"	Noam Pitlik	Tony Sheehan	November 27, 1980
The squad deals with an epidemic of heroin, a smoker doesn't take breaking the habit very well and a new detective who thinks the detectives are on the take asks to be left out. (Note: First of three appearances of Det. Dorsey.)
131	5	"Agent Orange"	Noam Pitlik	Tony Sheehan	December 11, 1980
Being a veteran of the Vietnam War, Wojo investigates the effects of Agent Orange on an arrested robber who is also a former Vietnam vet, while Mrs. Brauer wants her husband arrested for being naked all the time. (Note: Second of three appearances of Det. Dorsey.)
132	6	"Call Girl"	Noam Pitlik	Jeff Stein & Frank Dungan	December 18, 1980
Dorsey becomes overprotective of a 15-year-old hooker, while Dietrich tries the "new celibacy", Barney fields calls from powerful men concerned about a high-end escort's "little black book" and Harris gets stock tips from an unlikely source. (Note: Third and final appearance of Det. Dorsey.)
133	7	"Resignation"	Noam Pitlik	Jeff Stein & Frank Dungan	January 8, 1981
Dietrich resigns after he shoots a young suspect during a holdup.
134	8	"Field Associate"	Noam Pitlik	Jordan Moffet	January 15, 1981
A memo from Internal Affairs suggests that one of the detectives is a spy, while a veteran criminal is dying of cancer.
135	9	"Movie: Part 1"	Noam Pitlik	Jeff Stein & Frank Dungan	January 22, 1981
Harris creates an erotic film as part of an undercover assignment, while Wojo is accused of molesting a male suspect and the battle between radio and TV takes on a whole new meaning.
136	10	"Movie: Part 2"	Noam Pitlik	Jeff Stein & Frank Dungan	January 29, 1981
Luger is just in time to see Harris' erotic film...will the results be worth it?
137	11	"The Psychic"	Noam Pitlik	Jeff Stein, Frank Dungan & Tony Sheehan	February 5, 1981
A psychic stops a purse snatcher from committing his crime, while a linguist tears down a grammatically incorrect poster.
138	12	"Stormy Weather"	Noam Pitlik	Nat Mauldin	February 12, 1981
On a stormy night, Harris is sick, Levitt tries to communicate with a deaf woman and Wojo goes missing in the Hudson River while chasing a suspect.
139	13	"The Librarian"	Noam Pitlik	Tony Sheehan & Jeff Stein & Frank Dungan	February 19, 1981
The detectives deal with a gun-toting librarian and a store owner has his store vandalized by a gypsy who claims the owner is a Nazi war criminal.
140	14	"Rachel"	Homer Powell	Tony Sheehan & Jeff Stein & Frank Dungan	February 26, 1981
Barney's daughter makes plans to go out with Wojo, much to Barney's surprise... and concern, while the portrayal of a character in Harris' novel gets him sued for libel.
141	15	"Contempt: Part 1"	Noam Pitlik	Frank Dungan & Jeff Stein	March 12, 1981
Barney refuses to reveal his sources in a drug-bust case.
142	16	"Contempt: Part 2"	Noam Pitlik	Frank Dungan & Jeff Stein	March 19, 1981
Harris takes over the squadroom while Barney is held in contempt of court.
143	17	"The Doll"	Noam Pitlik	Story by : Jordan Moffet & Nat Mauldin; Teleplay by : Tony Sheehan	March 26, 1981
A woman's doll - worth $5,000 - is stolen, while a man buys a ticket to take a flight aboard the Space Shuttle.
144	18	"Lady and the Bomb"	Noam Pitlik	Lee H. Grant	April 9, 1981
Fish stops by the station where two fighting chess players are brought in, a woman blames radioactive waste for her husband's impotence and Harris' libel case is decided.
145	19	"Riot"	Noam Pitlik	Story by : Greg Giangregorio; Teleplay by : Frank Dungan & Jeff Stein	April 30, 1981
A group of Orthodox Jews complain about the precinct's slow responses to emergencies and Luger makes matters worse, while a survivalist couple sets up housekeeping in the sewers.
146	20	"The Vests"	Noam Pitlik	Nat Mauldin	May 7, 1981
As the precinct receives new bulletproof vests, an inventor thinks someone's trying to rip him off and Luger wants biographies of his fellow detectives.
147	21	"The Rainmaker"	Noam Pitlik	Story by : Paul Robinson Hunter & Jeff Stein & Frank Dungan; Teleplay by : Jeff Stein & Frank Dungan	May 14, 1981
A rainmaker hired by the city builds a bonfire due to a drought, while the detectives consider a job opening in Vice.
148	22	"Liquidation"	Noam Pitlik	Jeff Stein & Frank Dungan	May 21, 1981
A newspaper vendor is charged with petty trespassing, while Harris must deal with the consequences of his lost libel suit.
