= Barney Miller season 5 =

Barney Miller
- Season 5
- No. of episodes: 24

Release
- Original network: ABC
- Original release: September 14, 1978 – May 17, 1979

Season chronology
- ← Previous; Season 4 Next → Season 6

This is a list of episodes from the fifth season of Barney Miller.

== Broadcast history ==
The season originally aired Thursdays at 9:00-9:30 pm (EST).

== Episodes ==
No. overall	No. in season	Title	Directed by	Written by	Original release date
81–82	1–2	"Kidnapping"	Noam Pitlik	Danny Arnold, Reinhold Weege & Tony Sheehan	September 14, 1978
The children of a kidnapped merchant request a quick investigation and Wojo is annoyed by the friendly attitude of a prostitute he's booking.
83	3	"The Search"	Noam Pitlik	Story by : Bob Colleary; Teleplay by : Bob Colleary & Tony Sheehan	September 21, 1978
Harris shaves off his moustache in order to play a female decoy to catch a mugger, while a woman claims that a man is her father who's been missing since her birth.
84	4	"Dog Days"	Noam Pitlik	Reinhold Weege	September 28, 1978
While breaking up a dog-fighting ring, Wojo is bitten by a German shepherd that may have rabies.
85	5	"The Baby Broker"	Noam Pitlik	Tony Sheehan	October 5, 1978
The cops meet a lawyer who specializes in the selling of unborn babies when a couple are arrested while trying to prevent a pregnant woman from going home to Germany.
86	6	"Accusation"	Max Gail	Wally Dalton & Shelley Zellman	October 12, 1978
Dietrich is accused of lewd conduct and assault by a lovelorn woman.
87	7	"The Prisoner"	Noam Pitlik	Reinhold Weege, Wally Dalton & Shelley Zellman	October 19, 1978
A parolee breaks the law just to get back in jail, while the widow of a cat burglar continues her husband's work.
88	8	"Loan Shark"	Noam Pitlik	Story by : Judith Anne Nielsen, Richard William Beban, Mario Roccuzzo & Bob Colleary; Teleplay by : Tony Sheehan	November 2, 1978
Harris deals with a teenage loan shark, while Yemana makes a fuss about his lowly status after twenty years on the job.
89	9	"The Vandal"	Noam Pitlik	Dennis Koenig & Tony Sheehan	November 9, 1978
Someone with a grudge against Barney has vandalized the 12th Precinct squadroom...and Levitt is a suspect: Final appearance of Nick Yemana portrayed by Jack Soo who died of cancer January 11, 1979.
90	10	"The Harris Incident"	Noam Pitlik	Reinhold Weege, Wally Dalton & Shelley Zellman	November 30, 1978
While trying to arrest a robbery suspect Harris is shot at by uniformed cops, and the reasons for the mistake, racial profiling, puts him on edge. An out-of-work Wall Street stockbroker is arrested for begging, which turns out to be a shock to his wife.
91	11	"The Radical"	Noam Pitlik	Story by : Lee H. Grant; Teleplay by : Tony Sheehan	December 7, 1978
Luger collapses with chest pains while arguing with a former radical who's been captured after nine years underground.
92	12	"Toys"	Noam Pitlik	Story by : Wally Dalton & Shelley Zellman; Teleplay by : Wally Dalton & Shelley Zellman & Tony Sheehan	December 14, 1978
At Christmastime, Barney has to deal not only with feuding toy sellers and a claustrophobic thief, but also with his separation from his wife.
93	13	"The Indian"	Noam Pitlik	Story by : Richard William Beban, Judith Anne Nielsen & Reinhold Weege; Teleplay by : Reinhold Weege	January 4, 1979
Wojo expresses his concern for an elderly Indian who's decided to die, while Harris helps out a woman whose shoes were stolen off of her feet.
94	14	"Voice Analyzer"	Noam Pitlik	Story by : James Bonnet; Teleplay by : James Bonnet & Reinhold Weege	January 11, 1979
Lt. Scanlon of Internal Affairs probes the 12th Precinct with a voice analyzer...and the results prove quite interesting.
95	15	"The Spy"	Noam Pitlik	Tony Sheehan	January 18, 1979
A former C.I.A. agent thinks the squadroom and everyone in it (including civilians) are part of an Agency plot against him.
96–97	16–17	"Wojo's Girl"	Noam Pitlik	Tony Sheehan & Danny Arnold	January 25, 1979
Wojo's new girlfriend wants to move in with him, which scares him. (This episode was a backdoor pilot for a spin-off show that would focus on a different member of the squad's life outside the precinct - however, it was not picked up)
98	18	"Middle Age"	Noam Pitlik	Story by : Wally Dalton & Shelley Zellman; Teleplay by : Reinhold Weege & Danny Arnold	February 1, 1979
Barney is feeling the middle-age blues, especially now that he has to wear glasses, while the detectives search for a mugger targeting Hasidic jewelers.
99	19	"The Counterfeiter"	Max Gail	Reinhold Weege, Frank Dungan & Jeff Stein	February 8, 1979
Harris pursues a counterfeiter, while Luger, recovered from his heart attack, goes to Barney for some life (and love) advice.
100	20	"Open House"	Noam Pitlik	Tony Sheehan, Wally Dalton & Shelley Zellman	February 15, 1979
The precinct's open house is attended only by derelicts, while a psychiatrist is reluctant to reveal the name of an arson suspect.
101	21	"Identity"	Noam Pitlik	Tom Reeder	March 1, 1979
An air-traffic controller is brought into the station for trying to kill Harris, while a robber begs not to be locked up.
102	22	"Computer Crime"	Max Gail	Story by : Dennis Koenig & Calvin Kelly; Teleplay by : Calvin Kelly	March 15, 1979
A citizen believes he's been cursed by a witch. An employee of a brokerage firm is arrested for embezzlement.
103	23	"Graveyard Shift"	Noam Pitlik	Tony Sheehan	May 10, 1979
Season finale episode. During the graveyard shift, the station receives bomb threats and Harris tapes conversations for a book he's writing.
104	24	"Jack Soo, a Retrospective"	Noam Pitlik	(Unlisted)	May 17, 1979
An unscripted memorial episode where the actors are out of character, made as a tribute to Jack Soo, who played detective Nick Yemana. Soo died midway through the season.
