= Barney Miller season 2 =

Barney Miller
- Season 2
- No. of episodes: 22

Release
- Original network: ABC
- Original release: September 11, 1975 – March 18, 1976

Season chronology
- ← Previous; Season 1 Next → Season 3

This is a list of episodes from the second season of Barney Miller.

== Broadcast history ==
The season originally aired Thursdays at 8:00-8:30 pm (EST) and 8:30-9:00 pm (EST).

== Episodes ==
No. overall	No. in season	Title	Directed by	Written by	Original release date
14	1	"Doomsday"	Noam Pitlik	Danny Arnold, Chris Hayward & Arne Sultan	September 11, 1975
A disgruntled man (William Windom) threatens to blow up the squadroom with a belt of dynamite unless all the corrupt politicians are arrested, while the plumbing goes haywire and Wojo arrests a phony man-of-the-cloth (Steve Landesberg).
15	2	"The Social Worker"	Noam Pitlik	Danny Arnold, Chris Hayward & Arne Sultan	September 18, 1975
Barney worries when Elizabeth's new job as a social worker takes her to a tough part of the East Bronx. Harris becomes obsessed with a master forger and Fish deals with memory lapses as he forgets Bernice’s birthday.
16	3	"The Layoff"	Noam Pitlik	Danny Arnold, Chris Hayward & Arne Sultan	September 25, 1975
A labor layoff forces Barney, Fish and Yemana to man the squadroom without Chano, Harris and Wojo, while a manicurist (Candice Azzara) goes deeper than the nail and a morose former stockbroker (Bob Dishy) becomes a petty thief.
17	4	"Ambush"	Noam Pitlik	Danny Arnold, Chris Hayward & Arne Sultan	October 2, 1975
Yemana is shot in front of uninterested witnesses and Barney is offered a job in Florida.
18	5	"Heat Wave"	Noam Pitlik	Story by : Danny Arnold, Chris Hayward & Arne Sultan; Teleplay by : Danny Arnold & Chris Hayward	October 9, 1975
As a heat wave strikes New York, a wife (Janet Ward) claims spousal abuse and a reluctant Wojo goes out in drag with Wentworth as bait to catch a park rapist. (Note: Second of five appearances of Det. Wentworth.)
19	6	"The Arsonist"	Noam Pitlik	Tony Sheehan	October 16, 1975
Harris is on the lookout for an arsonist (Steve Franken) who is terrorizing the neighborhood, while Chano arrests a man (Roger Bowen) for shooting at a candy machine.
20	7	"Grand Hotel"	Noam Pitlik	Story by : Danny Arnold & Chris Hayward; Teleplay by : Danny Arnold, Chris Hayward & Arne Sultan	October 23, 1975
Wojo and Wentworth go undercover as a married couple at a hotel that's been experiencing a series of robberies. (Note: Third of five appearances of Det. Wentworth.)
21	8	"Discovery"	Lee Bernhardi	Tom Reeder, Danny Arnold & Chris Hayward	October 30, 1975
Marty believes a member of the 12th Precinct is harassing the gay community, while the police department computers think Fish is dead.
22	9	"You Dirty Rat"	Noam Pitlik	Story by : Arne Sultan; Teleplay by : Arne Sultan, Chris Hayward & Danny Arnold	November 13, 1975
Confiscated marijuana goes missing, a homeless man (J. Pat O'Malley) is brought in for spending the night in a department store and a man (Franklyn Ajaye) is arrested for stealing a police car.
23	10	"Horse Thief"	Noam Pitlik	Tony Sheehan	November 20, 1975
A hansom cab driver (Liam Dunn) reports his horse stolen and despite all evidence to the contrary a man (Jack Dodson) assaulted in his hotel room swears he was alone. The episode takes place on July 4, 1976.
24	11	"Rain"	Noam Pitlik	Story by : Danny Arnold & Chris Hayward; Teleplay by : Tony Sheehan	November 27, 1975
It's a rainy day as the squad contends with the roof on the verge of collapsing and a nightclub comedian (Sidney Miller) telling bad historical jokes.
25	12	"Fish"	Noam Pitlik	Danny Arnold, Chris Hayward & Herbert Baker	December 4, 1975
Fish is forced to go on restricted duty. First appearance of Detective Arthur P. Dietrich.
26	13	"Hot Dogs"	Lee Bernhardi	Story by : Chris Hayward, Danny Arnold & Arne Sultan; Teleplay by : Tony Sheehan	December 11, 1975
A man believes that Jean Harlow is his missing wife and a gung-ho pair of female officers (Jonelle Allen, Nellie Bellflower) make an overzealous drug bust.
27	14	"Protection"	Noam Pitlik	Story by : Danny Arnold, Chris Hayward & Tom Reeder; Teleplay by : Tom Reeder	December 18, 1975
The local citizenry start panicking amid rumors of the 12th Precinct shutting down, while a repentant hood (Ray Sharkey) is unable to prove he committed a crime.
28	15	"Happy New Year"	Bruce Bilson	Danny Arnold, Chris Hayward & Arne Sultan	January 8, 1976
On New Year's Eve, Fish tries to stop a jumper and Wojo delivers a baby.
29	16	"Sniper"	Lee Bernhardi	Tom Reeder, Danny Arnold & Chris Hayward	January 22, 1976
A con man (Jay Robinson) sells charter flights to Saturn, while a sniper targets first Wojo then Luger.
30	17	"Fear of Flying"	Lee Bernhardi	Reinhold Weege	January 29, 1976
Wojo, who's afraid of flying, must escort a bigamist (Jack Riley) back to Cleveland - then the bigamist's New York wife (Valerie Curtin) shows up.
31	18	"Block Party"	Noam Pitlik	Tom Reeder	February 12, 1976
In his first appearance, Lt. Ben Scanlon denies Wentworth any credit for busting an assassin at a block party. (Note: Fourth of five appearances of Det. Wentworth.)
32	19	"Massage Parlor"	Dennis Steinmetz	Tony Sheehan	February 19, 1976
Wentworth arrests a dime-store cowboy (Charles Frank) at a massage parlor, while the other detectives arrest an octogenarian mugger. (Note: Fifth and final appearance of Det. Wentworth.)
33	20	"The Psychiatrist"	Noam Pitlik	Story by : Gregory Tiefer; Teleplay by : Tony Sheehan, Danny Arnold & Chris Hayward	February 26, 1976
After a particularly zealous bust by Wojo, a psychiatrist (Fred Sadoff) advises the Department to suspend Wojo and confiscate his gun.
34	21	"The Kid"	Stan Lathan	Tony Sheehan, Chris Hayward & Danny Arnold	March 4, 1976
Fish is attracted to a mugger kid's mother, while a man tries to obtain an unclaimed windfall he found on the street.
35	22	"The Mole"	Mark Warren	Reinhold Weege, Chris Hayward & Danny Arnold	March 18, 1976
As Fish considers an operation, Harris and Wojo chase a burglar called "The Mole" (Ron Carey) through the sewers. Final appearance of Gregory Sierra as Chano.
