= Cliff Hare =

American football player

Clifford Leroy Hare was a member of Auburn University’s first football team who went on to serve as chair of the Auburn Faculty Athletic Committee. Auburn’s football stadium, Jordan–Hare Stadium, is co-named for the longtime professor and dean of the School of Chemistry. He served as president of the Southern Conference before the formation of the Southeastern Conference.

== Biography ==
Clifford Leroy Hare was born in 1869, in what is now known as the Oak Bowery Community just north of Opelika, Alabama. In 1888, Hare began his one-half century relationship with Alabama Polytechnic Institute (API), which eventually became Auburn University.

Deeply involved in academics, athletics and policymaking at API, Cliff Hare’s biggest concern was for the development of the complete man. He strove to see that the young students who entered college there would have the opportunity to develop into well-rounded future citizens of Alabama. He often quoted Shakespeare in his chemistry classes, and he discussed philosophy with students and Auburn townspeople. His philosophy is summed up in an inscription on the Cliff Hare award, “Athletics make men strong, study makes men wise, and character makes men great.” This belief manifested itself in how he approached his personal life. He was involved in teaching, mentoring and enabling well-governed sports events at the university, as well as working to improve his community.

== Notable Accomplishments ==
Specific highlights of Dean Hare's career at Auburn follow:

- B.S. from API in 1891/ M.S. API in 1892
- Member of Auburn's first football team, 1892, which played the first intercollegiate football game in the South against Georgia
- Masters studies at University of Chicago, late 1890s
- M.A. University of Michigan in 1903
- Worked in the establishment of regulations for eligibility requirements for student athletes at API as well as SIAA (Southern Intercollegiate Athletic Association, which was at the time the only governing body concerning collegiate athletes in the south.) in 1906
- Served as the first president of the Southern Athletic Conference (the predecessor to the Southeastern Conference) in 1932.
- Began design of Auburn's first golf course 1914.
- Active in the scheduling and administration of Auburn's early baseball teams.
- Served as Chairman of API's Faculty Athletic Committee for an untold number of years.
- Named Dean of the School of Chemistry and Pharmacy as well as State Chemist in 1932.
- Director of Bank of Auburn (presently Auburn Bank) from 1914-1948.
- Member of Auburn City Council 1917-1920.
- Served as interim Mayor of Auburn around 1919.
- Spearheaded a group of citizens to establish a medical clinic for citizens of Auburn who were not receiving medical care.

== Legacy ==
Cliff Hare served as part of the foundation of character-building forces of the school and the community of Auburn for nearly fifty years. In reality, his impact was felt throughout the southeast. In the 1934 API-Georgia football program, he is described as “one of the most beloved characters connected with athletics in the South.”

Coach Jordan tells the following story, “Fessor Hare told me how he and Dr. Sanford - for whom the stadium in Athens is named - used to come to Auburn every year after the Auburn-Georgia game in Columbus to divide the money. They would sit down in the Hare kitchen, take the money out of an old cigar box, and spread it across a marble tabletop and say, ‘a dollar for you and a dollar for us’ until the game proceeds were divided equally between the two schools.”

Clifford Leroy Hare was one of a handful of Auburn men who believed in the potential of Auburn's football program. He labored on many levels for more than 56 years, even while in poor health, to see this program come to maturity.
