= Barney Miller season 3 =

Barney Miller
- Season 3
- No. of episodes: 22

Release
- Original network: ABC
- Original release: September 23, 1976 – March 31, 1977

Season chronology
- ← Previous; Season 2 Next → Season 4

This is a list of episodes from the third season of Barney Miller. This was the final season to feature a live studio audience.

== Broadcast history ==
The season originally aired Thursdays at 8:30-9:00 pm (EST) and 9:00-9:30 pm (EST).

== Episodes ==
No. overall	No. in season	Title	Directed by	Written by	Original release date
36	1	"Evacuation"	Noam Pitlik	Story by : Chris Hayward & Danny Arnold; Teleplay by : Danny Arnold	September 23, 1976
During a hurricane, Wojo worries about civil evacuation procedures, while Harris deals with a delinquent.
37	2	"Quarantine: Part 1"	Lee Bernhardi	Tony Sheehan	September 30, 1976
The station is quarantined for smallpox when a suspect collapses in the squadroom.
38	3	"Quarantine: Part 2"	Noam Pitlik	Tony Sheehan & Danny Arnold	October 7, 1976
The quarantined cops and civilian visitors get cabin fever, which results in some surprising admissions (especially from Harris). First appearance of Officer Carl Levitt.
39	4	"Bus Stop"	Noam Pitlik	Story by : Reinhold Weege & Chris Hayward & Danny Arnold; Teleplay by : Tony Sheehan & Danny Arnold & Reinhold Weege & Jerry Ross	October 14, 1976
While the victims of a bus holdup want vengeance on the robber, they don't want to get involved. Detective Arthur P. Dietrich is now regularly featured.
40	5	"The Election"	Lee Bernhardi	Tom Reeder	October 21, 1976
On Election Night, Yemena places bets on all races and a shoplifter wants an escort to the polls.
41	6	"Werewolf"	Noam Pitlik	Story by : Seymour Blicker & Tony Sheehan; Teleplay by : Tony Sheehan & Reinhold Weege & Danny Arnold & Seymour Blicker	October 28, 1976
Stefan Kopechne turns himself into the station claiming to be a werewolf, and a couple visiting New York for the first time are robbed by their cab driver.
42	7	"The Recluse"	Bruce Bilson	Story by : Chris Hayward & Reinhold Weege; Teleplay by : Reinhold Weege & Danny Arnold	November 11, 1976
The station deals with two runaways - one trying to avoid jury duty and another predicting doom.
43	8	"Noninvolvement"	Bruce Bilson	Story by : Chris Hayward & Danny Arnold & Reinhold Weege; Teleplay by : Reinhold Weege	November 18, 1976
Wojo takes an uncooperative mugging witness into custody, a situation made worse by attorney Arnold Ripner.
44	9	"Power Failure"	Noam Pitlik	Story by : Reinhold Weege & Danny Arnold & Tony Sheehan; Teleplay by : Tony Sheehan & Danny Arnold	December 9, 1976
When the cops haul him in, an assault-and-battery suspect claims someone else committed the crime: his other personality. Meanwhile, the precinct deals with a power outage covering the entire neighborhood.
45	10	"Christmas Story"	Bruce Bilson	Reinhold Weege & Tony Sheehan	December 23, 1976
Fish pursues a man who's been mugging department-store Santas. Nick falls for a prostitute who is also a robbery victim.
46	11	"Hash"	Noam Pitlik	Tom Reeder	December 30, 1976
Wojo unknowingly brings hash-laced brownies into the precinct. Officer Carl Levitt is now regularly featured. In 1997, TV Guide ranked this episode #77 on its list of the 100 Greatest Episodes.
47	12	"Smog Alert"	Bruce Bilson	Story by : Chris Hayward & Danny Arnold; Teleplay by : Reinhold Weege	January 6, 1977
During a particularly bad smog alert, Fish has a respiratory collapse when he coaxes a jumper of a bridge.
48	13	"Community Relations"	Noam Pitlik	Story by : Winston Moss & Tony Sheehan; Teleplay by : Tony Sheehan & Larry Balmagia & Dennis Koenig	January 13, 1977
Barney tries to help an evicted tenant and a blind shoplifter. Meanwhile, Wojo suffers from nervousness in court.
49	14	"The Rand Report"	Noam Pitlik	Story by : Roland Kibbee & Reinhold Weege; Teleplay by : Reinhold Weege	January 20, 1977
When an independent report causes the department to order third-grade detectives to do uniform duty for a week each month, Wojo (the squad's only third-grader) refuses to comply.
50	15	"Fire '77"	Bruce Bilson	Tony Sheehan	January 27, 1977
A couple make a suicide pact but neither can go through with it. Their hope looks to be realized when an arrested thief sets fire to the squadroom.
51	16	"Abduction"	Bruce Bilson	Story by : Tom Reeder; Teleplay by : Tony Sheehan & Reinhold Weege & Tom Reeder	February 3, 1977
A girl's parents claim that she has been brainwashed by a cult and want Barney to rescue her.
52	17	"Sex Surrogate"	Noam Pitlik	Story by : Jerry Ross & Tony Sheehan; Teleplay by : Tony Sheehan & Larry Balmagia & Dennis Koenig	February 10, 1977
A woman shoots her husband for seeing a sex therapist, while Harris investigates thefts by juvenile delinquents.
53	18	"Moonlighting"	Noam Pitlik	Reinhold Weege	February 17, 1977
Harris's moonlighting as a building's Captain of Security interferes with his job at the precinct.
54	19	"Asylum"	Danny Arnold & Alex March	Story by : Roland Kibbee; Teleplay by : Roland Kibbee & Danny Arnold & Reinhold Weege & Tony Sheehan	February 24, 1977
Wojo arrests a Soviet diplomat for assaulting a musician who wants to defect to the U.S.
55	20	"Group Home"	Lee Bernhardi	Story by : Larry Balmagia & Dennis Koenig; Teleplay by : Danny Arnold & Tony Sheehan	March 10, 1977
An Army recruiting office reports a bomb threat, while Fish wears drag to catch a mugger at a time when Bernice comes to visit.
56	21	"Strike: Part 1"	Jeremiah Morris	Story by : Larry Balmagia & Dennis Koenig; Teleplay by : Reinhold Weege	March 24, 1977
The men go on strike to get more pay and better working conditions, leaving only Barney, Levitt and Luger to man the squadroom.
57	22	"Strike: Part 2"	Danny Arnold	Story by : Larry Balmagia & Dennis Koenig; Teleplay by : Tony Sheehan & Danny Arnold & Reinhold Weege	March 31, 1977
Barney deals with the strike, a flirtatious robbery victim and his own feelings of abandonment.
