= Harold Hair =

American professional baseball player (1932–2025)

- Third baseman / Shortstop
- Born: May 29, 1932; Jacksonville, Florida, U.S.
- Died: April 21, 2025 (aged 92); Atlanta, Georgia, U.S.
- Batted: Left Threw: Right

Harold O. "Buster" Hair (May 29, 1932 – April 21, 2025) was American professional third baseman and shortstop who played in the Negro leagues in the 1950s. Playing for the Birmingham Black Barons and Kansas City Monarchs during his baseball career, Hair was an above-average contact hitter whose best season came in 1958 with the Monarchs.

== Early life ==
Born in Jacksonville, Florida, Hair worked as a bat boy for the Jacksonville Red Caps as a kid. Hair attended North Carolina Agricultural and Technical State University, and played on four consecutive championship-winning teams. He finished his senior year as captain of the team and went on to earn a master's degree in Education at the University of Florida.

== Professional career ==
In 1953, Hair signed with Birmingham Barons and, as a rookie, he was invited to the East-West All-Star Game. His baseball career was interrupted in 1954 by obligations to the military. Afterwards, Hair joined the Kansas City Monarchs, a team he played with for four years. Hair's best statistical season was in 1958 when he led the Negro leagues in batting average (some reports, including from Hill himself, say he hit .355, while others put the number at .432).

In 1956, Hair played 14 games of minor league baseball for the Hamilton Red Wings in the Pennsylvania-Ontario-New York League, batting .273 with 4 RBIs.

== Personal life and death ==
Following his career in the Negro leagues, Hair coached baseball, basketball, and football in the Duval County school system. He was the first black basketball coach for William M. Raines High School, earning the coach of the year award for leading the team to a regional championship. In addition, Hair mentored several future professional athletes, including Ken Burrough, Harold Carmichael, Harold Hart, and Leonard "Truck" Robinson.

Hair later became a pastor at St. John's Missionary Baptist Church.

Hair died in Atlanta, Georgia on April 21, 2025, at the age of 92.

== Honors and awards ==
- North Carolina A&T Hall of Fame (1996)
