= Hairy RNA localisation element (HLE) =

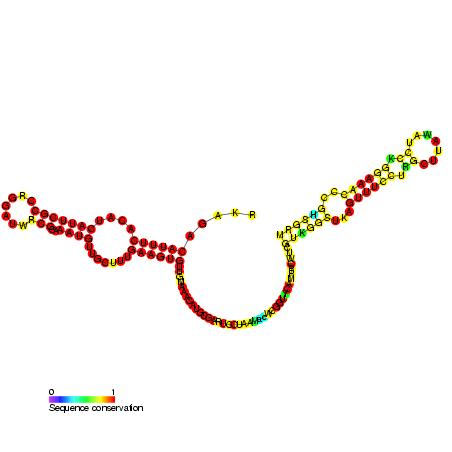
- Predicted secondary structure and sequence conservation of HLE

Identifiers
- Symbol: HLE
- Rfam: RF00437

Other data
- RNA type: Cis-reg
- Domain(s): Eukaryota
- SO: SO:0000233
- PDB structures: PDBe

The hairy localisation element (HLE) is an RNA element found in the 3' UTR of the hairy gene. HLE contains two stem-loops. HLE is essential for the mediation of apical localisation and the two stem-loop structures act to allow the recognition of hairy mRNA by the localisation machinery. HLE is found in Drosophila species.
