= William Hair =

Scottish footballer

Personal information
- Full name: William Hair
- Date of birth: 1904
- Place of birth: Edinburgh, Scotland
- Position: Outside right

Senior career*
Years	Team	Apps	(Gls)
–	Newtongrange Star		
1923–1925	Broxburn United	70	(21)
1925–1926	Bo'ness	32	(13)
1926–1928	Rangers	2	(2)
1928–1929	Grimsby Town	6	(2)
1929	Peebles Rovers		
1929	Rhyl Athletic		
1929–1930	Flint Town		
1930–1931	Leith Athletic	3	(0)
- * Club domestic league appearances and goals

William Hair (born 1904; date of death unknown) was a Scottish professional footballer who played mainly as an outside right. During his time as a reserve player at Rangers, he was involved in a serious bus crash near to Ibrox Park, along with the team captain David Meiklejohn.
