= George Hair =

English footballer

Personal information
- Full name: George Hair
- Date of birth: 28 April 1925
- Place of birth: Ryton, Tyne and Wear, England
- Date of death: 1994 (aged 68–69)
- Height: 5 ft 4 in (1.63 m)
- Position: Winger

Youth career
- 1942–1943: Spen Juniors

Senior career*
Years	Team	Apps	(Gls)
1943–1946	Newcastle United	23	(7)
1946–1951	Grimsby Town	68	(8)
1951–1953	Peterborough United		
1953–1957	Boston United		
1957–19??	Spalding United		
- * Club domestic league appearances and goals

George Hair (28 April 1925 – 1994) was an English professional footballer who played as a winger.
