= Barney Miller season 1 =

Barney Miller
- Season 1
- No. of episodes: 13

Release
- Original network: ABC
- Original release: January 23 – May 1, 1975

Season chronology
- Next → Season 2

This is a list of episodes from the first season of Barney Miller.

== Broadcast history ==
The season originally aired Thursdays at 8:00-8:30 pm (EST).

== Episodes ==
No. overall	No. in season	Title	Directed by	Written by	Original release date
1	1	"Ramon"	Bill Davis	Theodore J. Flicker & Danny Arnold	January 23, 1975
A teenage junkie holds the 12th Precinct hostage.
2	2	"Experience"	Danny Arnold	Steve Gordon	January 30, 1975
The men look for a "mad bomber" and try to cheer up Fish, who thinks he's too old to work. First appearances of Marty Morrison and Arnold Ripner.
3	3	"Snow Job"	Richard Kinon	Ron Friedman & Danny Arnold & Chris Hayward	February 6, 1975
The squad deals with guarding a department store payroll and a flasher trying to kill himself in the bathroom.
4	4	"Graft"	Noam Pitlik	Story by : Lila Garrett & Sandford Krinski; Teleplay by : Danny Arnold & Chris Hayward	February 13, 1975
An old friend of Barney's is investigating allegations of corruption in the squadroom, while Chano is trying to catch an obscene phone caller.
5	5	"The Courtesans"	Noam Pitlik	Story by : Sanford Krinski & Jerome L. Davis; Teleplay by : Jerome L. Davis & Chris Hayward & Danny Arnold & Sybil Adelman	February 20, 1975
A prostitute (Nancy Dussault) is threatening Wojo with charges of harassment and Rachel is trying to find her own apartment.
6	6	"Stakeout"	John Rich	Danny Arnold	February 27, 1975
A bunch of curious neighbors interfere with a covert stakeout operation. Note: Most of this episode is set outside of the squad room.
7	7	"Bureaucrat"	Bob Finkel	Richard Baer & Chris Hayward & Danny Arnold	March 6, 1975
A drunken bureaucrat and a 12-year-old who robbed Chano are brought to the 12th Precinct, while Wojo has the squad's favorite deli shut down for minor health violations.
8	8	"Ms. Cop"	Noam Pitlik	Chris Hayward & Danny Arnold	March 13, 1975
An ambitious female cop tests the male-dominated 12th Precinct and Chano catches the obscene phone caller. (Note: First of five appearances of Det. Wentworth.)
9	9	"Vigilante"	Noam Pitlik	Story by : Howard Albrecht & Sol Weinstein; Teleplay by : Danny Arnold & Chris Hayward	March 20, 1975
In his first appearance, Inspector Luger complains about his men not being disliked enough, a vigilante is feeling his age and Wojo catches a cross-dressing teamster.
10	10	"The Guest"	Noam Pitlik	Danny Arnold & Chris Hayward & William Taub	March 27, 1975
The 12th Precinct must protect a mob witness (Herb Edelman) and Chano uses his own co-workers' money to set up a narcotics buy.
11	11	"Escape Artist"	Noam Pitlik	Howard Leeds & Danny Arnold & Chris Hayward	April 10, 1975
A so-called "bird man" (Leonard Frey) stops by, Barney holds an escape artist (Roscoe Lee Browne) for the FBI and Harris decides to write a book.
12	12	"Hair"	Allen Baron	Story by : Jerry Ross; Teleplay by : Ron Pearlman & Danny Arnold & Chris Hayward	April 17, 1975
Bernice learns that Fish spent the afternoon at a massage parlor. A lone wolf cop (Michael Lembeck) with a bad attitude joins the precinct from vice, but is made to shave off his prized beard, revealing a surprise weakness.
13	13	"The Hero"	Noam Pitlik	Danny Arnold & Chris Hayward	May 1, 1975
Chano feels guilty after killing two holdup men and Liz makes a citizen's arrest when an 8-year-old (Todd Bridges) robs her at "stickpoint."
