= Hare (computer virus) =

Windows based computer virus

Malware details
- Alias: Hare.7638
- Type: Virus
- Isolation date: August 1996
- Origin: New Zealand
- Author: Unknown

Technical details
- Size: 7,610 bytes

The Hare Virus was a destructive computer virus which infected DOS and Windows 95 machines in August 1996. It was also known as Hare.7610, Krsna and HD Euthanasia.

== Description ==
The virus was capable of infecting .COM and .EXE executable files, as well as the master boot record of hard disks and the boot sector on floppy disks. The virus was set to read the system date of the computer and activate on August 22 and September 22, at which time it would erase the hard disk in the computer and display the following message:

HDEuthanasia by Demon Emperor: Hare Krsna, hare, hare

== Timing ==
The date of the virus is controversial, even there is consensus that it started spreading at the end of the spring or at the beginning of the summer of 1996 in New Zealand, experts seem to disagree about the precise timing of the start of the spread. After a little while, its effects started to show up in South Africa and Canada. The United States saw the arrival of Hare in May 1996 and then continued spreading globally to Western and Eastern Europe.

== See also ==
- Timeline of computer viruses and worms
