= Hare, Texas =

- Unincorporated community
- Location within Texas
- Coordinates: 30.6710°N 97.2731°W
- Country: United States
- State: Texas
- County: Williamson

Population (2000)
  - Total: 70
- Time zone: UTC-6 (Central (EST))
  - Summer (DST): UTC-5 (CDT)
- Area codes: 512 and 737
- GNIS feature ID: 1379889

Hare is an unincorporated community in Williamson County, Texas, United States.

== Etymology ==
It is uncertain where the town's name originated from. Two theories are that it is named from the large amount of rabbits in the area, and that the town was nicknamed "Fuzzy". Other sources say that it was named after pioneers whose surname was Hare.

== Demographics ==
The town had a population of 15 in 1933, and 70 from 1940 until 2000.
