= Hare (surname) =

Hare is a surname. Notable people with the surname include:

== Politicians ==
- Butler B. Hare (1875–1967), American politician from South Carolina
- Darius D. Hare (1843–1897), American politician from Ohio
- Jack Hare, Canadian politician
- James Butler Hare (1918–1966), American politician from South Carolina
- John Hare, 1st Viscount Blakenham (1911–1982), British politician
- Nicholas Hare, British politician
- Phil Hare (born 1949), American politician from Illinois
- Silas Hare (1827–1907), American politician from Texas
- Thomas Hare (MP) (1686–1760), British politician from Cornwall
- William D. Hare (1834–1910), American politician from Oregon
- William G. Hare, American politician from Oregon
- William Hare, 1st Earl of Listowel (1751–1837), Irish peer and politician
- William Hare, 2nd Earl of Listowel (1801–1856), grandson of the 1st Earl, peer and politician
- William Hare, 3rd Earl of Listowel (1833–1924), son of the 2nd Earl, Baron Hare, politician
- William Francis Hare, 5th Earl of Listowel (1906–1997), British politician

== Athletes ==
- Albert Hare (1887–1969), British athlete
- Anne Hare, (born 1964), New Zealand athlete
- Cecil Hare, (1919–1963), American football player
- Charlie Hare (1871–1934), English football player
- Cliff Hare, American football player
- Darren Hare, English football player and coach
- Dusty Hare (born 1952), English rugby player
- Frode Håre, Norwegian ski jumper
- Pip Hare, British yachtswoman
- Ray Hare (1917–1975) America footballer
- Remon van de Hare, Dutch basketball player
- Steriker Hare (1900–1977), English cricketer
- Truxtun Hare, American decathlete

== Artists ==
- Channing Hare (1899–1976), American painter
- David Hare (artist) (1917–1992), American sculptor and photographer
- Jimmy Hare (1856–1946), photographer for Colliers

== Entertainers ==
- Doris Hare (1905–2000), Welsh actress
- Ernie Hare (1883–1939), American singer
- Ernest Hare (1900-?), English actor
- John Hare (1844–1921), English actor
- Katherine Hare, English theatre director
- Pat Hare (1930–1980), American singer and guitarist
- Robertson Hare (1891–1979), English comedy actor
- Will Hare (1916–1997), American actor

== Writers ==
- Augustus Hare (1834–1903), English writer
- Cyril Hare (1900–1958), English crime writer
- David Hare (dramatist) (born 1947), English dramatist

== Clergymen and theologians ==
- Augustus William Hare (1792–1834), English clergyman
- George Emlen Hare (1808–1892), American clergyman
- John Tyrrell Holmes Hare, Bishop of Bedford
- Julius Charles Hare (1795–1855), English theologian
- Richard Hare (bishop), Bishop of Pontefract
- William Hobart Hare (1838–1909), American clergyman

== Academics and scientists ==
- Douglas R. A. Hare, American professor
- John E. Hare (born 1949), American moral philosopher
- Kenneth Hare (1919–2002), Canadian meteorologist
- Peter H. Hare (1935–2008), American philosopher
- Raymond Allen Hare (born 1946), Australian wheat scientist
- Richard Mervyn Hare (1919–2002), English moral philosopher
- Robert Hare (chemist) (1781–1858), chemist
- Robert D. Hare, Canadian criminal psychologist
- Thomas Hare (political scientist), English barrister
- Tom Hare, professor and Japanologist

== Soldiers ==
- Joseph Hare, American admiral
- Luther Hare (1851–1929) American cavalry officer
- Peter Hare (officer) (1748–1834), American soldier

== Others ==
- Cecil Greenwood Hare (1875–1932), English architect
- Clayton Hare (1909–2001), Canadian teacher
- David Hare (philanthropist) (1775–1842), Scottish philanthropist
- Francis Hare, 6th Earl of Listowel
- Henry Hare (architect) (1861–1921), English architect
- Jon Hare (born 1966), British computer game designer
- Joseph C. Hare, American lumberman from Oregon
- Judith Hare, Countess of Listowel (1903–2003), British-Hungarian journalist
- Michael Hare, 2nd Viscount Blakenham (1938–2018), British peer
- Nathan Hare, American educationalist
- Sid J. Hare (1860–1938), American landscape architect
- William Hare (murderer) (1792–1859), Irish serial killer
