= Hare Island =

Island in India

Native name: Muyal Theevu
- Interactive map of Hare Island

Geography
- Coordinates: 9.20°N 79.08°E
- Area: 1.29 km^{2} (0.50 sq mi)

Administration
- India
- State: Tamil Nadu
- District: Thoothukudi

Hare Island is an island which lies adjoining the V. O. Chidambaranar Port Trust in Thoothukudi, India.

Hare Island forms a part of the Gulf of Mannar Marine National Park. With an area of 1.29 square kilometres, Hare Island is the largest island in the Gulf of Mannar. Muyal Theevu is better known as Raja Theevu or Pandian Theevu. It was referred by the Portuguese as Isle Des Reis. History has it that as the indigenous people of this coast, famous for pearl fishing, the Paravars, resorted to mass conversion, they were persecuted by the Nayaks of Madurai. So they fled from Tuticorin to Muyal Theevu, from where they migrated again in course of time.

Muyal Theevu is known for its healthy ecosystem of coral and sea grass.

Many tourists visit here during the Pongal holidays when special buses are operated for the benefit of the tourists.
