= List of Crazy Ex-Girlfriend characters =

Original main cast of Crazy Ex-Girlfriend, from left to right: Vella Lovell (Heather), Pete Gardner (Darryl), Santino Fontana (Greg), Rachel Bloom (Rebecca), Vincent Rodriguez III (Josh) and Donna Lynne Champlin (Paula)

Crazy Ex-Girlfriend is an American romantic musical comedy-drama television series which premiered on October 12, 2015, on The CW. The series was created by Rachel Bloom and Aline Brosh McKenna, and stars Bloom in the lead role.

The following is a list of characters that have appeared on the television series.

== Overview ==
Actor(s)	Character	Seasons			
Actor(s)	Character	1	2	3	4
Rachel Bloom (Note: Ava Acres portrays the younger version of Rebecca Bunch as a guest.)	Rebecca Bunch	Main	Main	Main	Main
Vincent Rodriguez III	Josh Chan	Main	Main	Main	Main
Santino Fontana	Greg Serrano	Main (Note: Santino Fontana is credited as main cast until the fourth episode of season two.)	Main	Stand-in	
Skylar Astin	Greg Serrano			Stand-in	Main (Note: Skylar Astin is credited as "also starring" in the eighth episode of season four and as main cast from episode 9 onwards.)
Donna Lynne Champlin	Paula Proctor	Main	Main	Main	Main
Pete Gardner	Darryl Whitefeather	Main	Main	Main	Main
Vella Lovell	Heather Davis	Main	Main	Main	Main
Gabrielle Ruiz	Valencia Perez	Recurring	Main	Main	Main
David Hull	Josh Wilson	Recurring	Recurring	Main	Special Guest Star
Scott Michael Foster	Nathaniel Plimpton III		Recurring	Main	Main

== Main cast ==
=== Rebecca Bunch ===
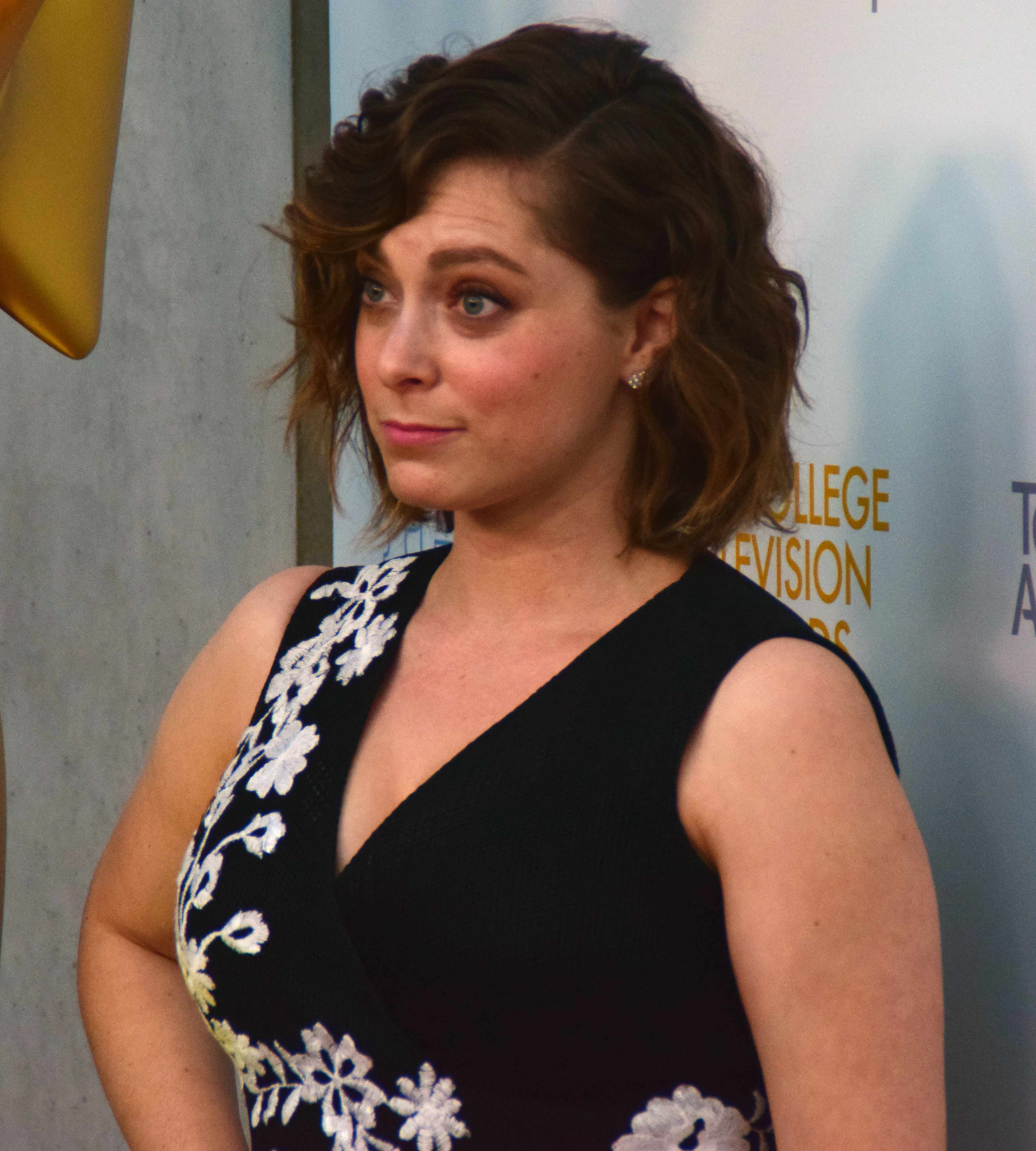
Rachel Bloom portrays the role of Rebecca.

Portrayed by Rachel Bloom, Rebecca Nora Bunch is a lawyer originally from Scarsdale, New York, who has obsessive tendencies and traits of anxiety and depression. She often acts on impulsive decisions, such as moving to West Covina to be with Josh, her childhood boyfriend, after having a five-minute conversation with him. When stressed, Rebecca often hallucinates, such as seeing her younger self (portrayed by Ava Acres). As she is prone to impulsive decisions, she spends over $10,000 on Josh in her attempts to win him back. After being dumped by both Josh and Greg, she ends up burning her house down in a fit of anxiety-fueled rage. Rebecca has a fear of rejection and does not react well under pressure, which leads her to spiral after bad things happen, demonstrated in seasons one and three. After she is left at the altar in the season two finale, she realizes that she has a problem, which she tries to fix but ultimately moves her obsession onto Nathaniel, which leads to her pushing her ex-boyfriend, Trent (Paul Welsh) off the roof of a building. She is diagnosed with Borderline Personality Disorder in season three, after a suicide attempt.

=== Josh Chan ===
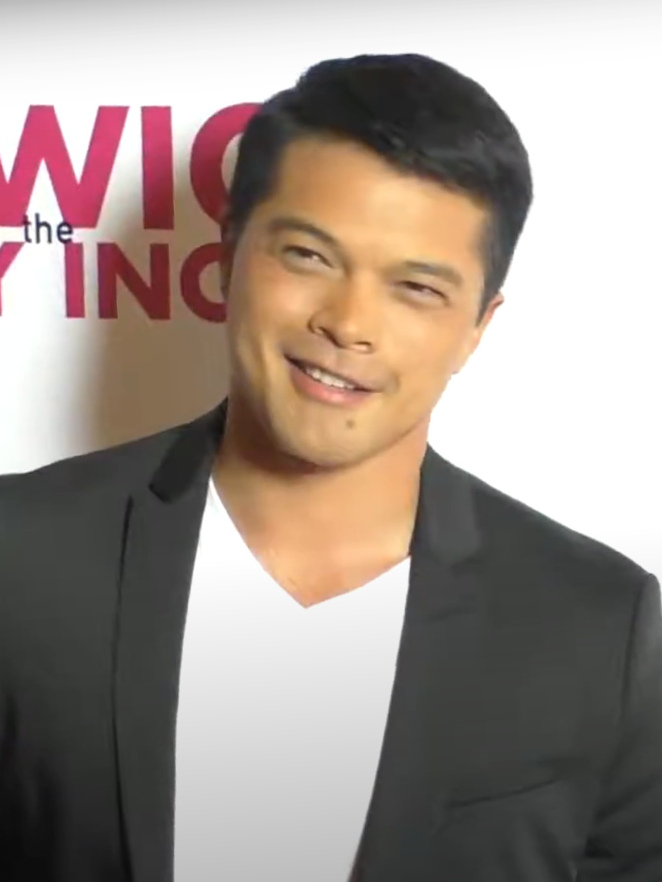
Vincent Rodriguez III

Portrayed by Vincent Rodriguez III, Joshua "Josh" Felix Chan is Rebecca's dim-witted childhood boyfriend, who centers as the object of Rebecca's affection throughout seasons one and two. During season one, he relocates himself from New York back to West Covina to be with his ex-girlfriend, Valencia Perez, and is often seen with his friends: Greg, Hector and "White Josh". He is usually optimistic and friendly, with a positive outlook on life. He and Greg have a falling out during season 1 due to their feelings for Rebecca, but work things out in season 2 before Greg moves to Atlanta to attend Emory University. Josh is of Filipino descent and demonstrates commitment issues in his relationships, shown as he refuses to propose to Valencia and leaves Rebecca at the altar (after Rebecca's obsessive admirer, Trent Maddock reveals him her history with mental health issues to break them up) to become a priest. He lacks awareness and has a tendency to be self-centered. He is a black-belt martial artist and worked for a Hawaiian-themed electronics retailer.

=== Greg Serrano ===
Portrayed by Santino Fontana (seasons 1–2) and Skylar Astin (season 4), Greg Serrano is Josh's best friend who works as a bartender. Unlike Josh, Greg is intelligent, pessimistic and cynical, with a longing to move away from West Covina. From the moment he meets Rebecca, they begin an on-and-off relationship, due to him having complicated feelings for her. He also has a relationship with Heather, Rebecca's neighbor, during season one, until Heather breaks it off. Greg suffers with alcohol addiction and, between seasons one and two, is arrested for driving drunk, which forces him to attend AA meetings and hide from his friends. Like Rebecca, Greg was raised mainly by a single parent, and he has a strong bond with his father, who suffers from emphysema. Greg has a strained relationship with his mother, who moved away, remarried and started another family. However, they begin repairing their relationship during season one. Greg and Josh have a falling out during season one due to their feelings for Rebecca, but patch up their differences in season two before Greg departs for graduate school. At the start of season two, his father helps him to achieve his full potential, leading Greg to leave West Covina to attend business school at Emory University. He struggles with the decision, however, due to his complicated feelings with Rebecca.

=== Paula Proctor ===
Paula Proctor (née O'Brien, portrayed by Donna Lynne Champlin) is Rebecca's co-worker and best friend. Originally from Buffalo, New York, she lives in West Covina with her husband, Scott, and children Brendan and Tommy. Paula forms an alliance with Rebecca over Josh but regularly goes over-the-top with her schemes, as a way to distract herself from her failing marriage. During helping Rebecca with a scheme, Paula and her husband rekindle their romance. After Rebecca begins sleeping with Greg, Paula realizes she has gone overboard and decides to get a degree in law. In her law class, she meets Sunil and begins to shut Rebecca out, including not telling her when she has an abortion. Towards the end of season three, Paula finds out about Rebecca's lies, and their relationship becomes strained once again. Champlin has received significant praise for her portrayal of Paula, especially with her abortion storyline.

=== Darryl Whitefeather ===
Portrayed by Pete Gardner, Darryl is Rebecca's co-worker, who sometimes struggles with keeping his emotions in check. Initially, Darryl is shown as a recent divorcée trying to get custody of his daughter, however he was ultimately considered the breakout star of season one due to his storyline with his sexuality, as he figures out he is bisexual. Later, he begins a relationship with Josh Wilson, the most stable relationship of the series, though they ultimately break up due to Darryl's need to have a child. Darryl projects his feelings of loneliness onto Paula, who he persistently calls his 'best friend', even though she disregards his feelings. He is prone to feelings of loneliness and has a psychological need to be liked by others. His break-up with Josh leads him to have a child, with Rebecca's egg, which Heather carries as surrogate. During the season three finale, their baby is born, and him and Josh reconcile. He names the baby "Hebecca Whitefeather".

=== Heather Davis ===
Portrayed by Vella Lovell, Heather is Rebecca's neighbor when she first moves to West Covina. Originally, she speaks to Rebecca as a means of getting a good grade in her 'abnormal psych' class. She begins a relationship with Greg, but ultimately breaks it off after seeing that he still has feelings for Rebecca. Her parents are displayed as being extremely supportive, which leads to her developing an aimless and apathetic personality, opposing Rebecca's parents. During season two, she becomes the face of the feminine care product "Miss Douche" and moves into an apartment with Rebecca. Heather repeatedly tries to get out of trouble by stating that she is a student, which changes in season three when she is forced to graduate against her will. She later becomes a regional manager for Home Base. As her life continues to go to higher levels, she begins a relationship with Hector (Erick Lopez) and becomes the surrogate for Darryl's baby.

=== Valencia Perez ===
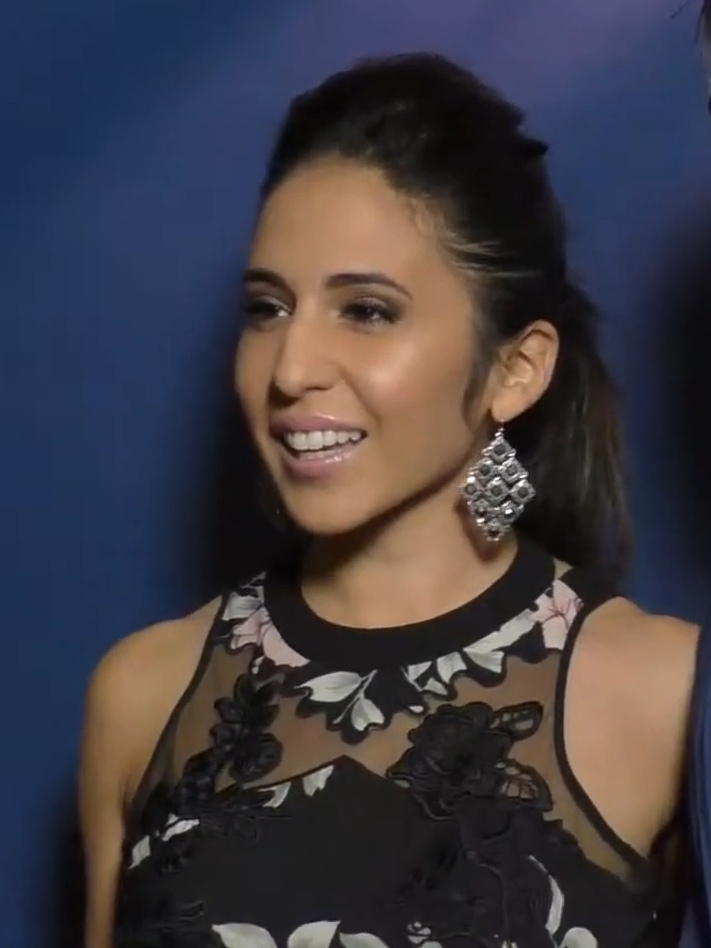
Valencia is played by Gabrielle Ruiz

Portrayed by Gabrielle Ruiz, Valencia (born Maria Perez) is Josh's teenage sweetheart, whom Josh moves back to West Covina to be with. Throughout season one, Valencia is seen as an antagonist, rivalling with Rebecca for Josh's love. However, since then, her perception has changed from an antagonist to a protagonist. Originally, Valencia is seen as a scary woman who doesn't eat properly, however after breaking up with Josh, she begins to eat healthier and add fat into her diet. When Rebecca and Heather bump into her, Rebecca grows obsessed with bonding with her and kidnaps her as a result; ultimately, the three form a girl group. Valencia also plans Rebecca and Josh's wedding, and after Rebecca is left at the wedding, Valencia helps with a revenge plot. After Rebecca's attempted suicide, Valencia breaks down, claiming she needs her and that she is extremely special to her. Valencia is in a relationship with Beth (Emma Willmann), making her the third bisexual character on the series.

=== Josh Wilson ===
Portrayed by David Hull, Josh Wilson, commonly referred to as White Josh or WhiJo by his friends, is a laid-back, caucasian male who bears a resemblance to Josh Chan. He is often seen with either Darryl, or Josh, Greg and Hector. He is often called judgy by his friends, yet is more practical than Greg and Josh. He is openly gay and, attracted to older men, entered into a relationship with Darryl after he came out as bisexual; ultimately they break up over their disagreements on having a child, however they reconcile after the baby is born. After their breakup, he befriends Nathaniel and the two enter into an extreme workout regime. He has never understood his friends' obsession with Rebecca, the two who never mesh themselves as friends except in social situations with their mutual friends.

=== Nathaniel Plimpton III ===
Portrayed by Scott Michael Foster, Nathaniel Plimpton is a successful lawyer who buys into Whitefeather & Associates and becomes Rebecca's new boss. He and Rebecca have a complicated relationship due to mutual dislike yet intense physical attraction to one other, and explore a relationship through part of season 3. After Rebecca calls it off over her fears that she is becoming obsessed again, he begins a relationship with Mona (Lyndon Smith), however throughout the whole nine months of the relationship he engages in casual sex with Rebecca. When Rebecca gets arrested for saving his life, he ultimately breaks up with Mona and acts as Rebecca's lawyer. Nathaniel appears to have sociopathic tendencies and little disregard for his actions, and has a fear of not living up to his father's image.

== Recurring cast ==
=== Introduced in season one ===
==== Hector ====
- Played by Erick Lopez

Often seen with Josh, Greg & White Josh (the four who are friends from high school along with Father Brah & Valencia, Hector the class president), Hector is an unorganised mid-20s male surfer who still lives with his mother, who he describes as his 'best friend'. The two have a podcast together, called Dating for All Ages. Hector oversleeps and fails to understand Greg's alcohol problem. He has always been scared of Valencia, who always dominates him. Throughout season three, he begins a relationship with Heather, and moves out of his house. Hector and Heather eventually get married.

==== Mrs. Hernandez ====
- Played by Gina Gallego

Rebecca's co-worker who is mute for most of seasons one and two, but finally speaks in "Who is Josh's Soup Fairy?". She claims to have spoken since the beginning without Rebecca ever noticing. When speaking she is usually rude, especially to Maya. Mrs. Hernandez is shown to have an active life including doing parkour on Friday nights.

==== Scott Proctor ====
- Played by Steve Monroe

Paula's husband, with whom the relationship is strained due to lacking communication. Rebecca rekindles their romance but Scott sleeps with his co-worker Tanya, leading to Paula kicking him out. His absence is fairly short as Scott shows himself to be a very loving and supportive spouse. Scott helps Paula when she has an abortion and encourages her through law school.

==== Brendan Proctor ====
- Played by Zayne Emory (Seasons 1, 3–4) and Elijah Nelson (Season 2)

Paula's oldest son who is described as a 'lost cause' and a 'trainwreck'. Brendan is known to leave home for weeks on end, stealing money, partaking in illegal drugs and keeping a large collection of knives. Brendan supports his mother through her abortion and tries to cheer her up when Rebecca relapses and runs away.

==== Tommy Proctor ====
- Played by Steele Stebbins

Paula's youngest son who has OCD and ADHD along with many other mental health-related disorders. Paula and Scott are shown to be neglectful towards him, demonstrated when Paula states she left him in a Barnes & Noble for an entire weekend. He appears to get along well with Rebecca.

==== Jason ====
- Played by Grant Rosenmeyer

A man who went on a date with Rebecca in Season 1. He had carpal tunnel syndrome and was using stress balls to help get rid of it. He reappears in Season 4 as a match Rebecca makes on a dating app. He and Rebecca seem to have a chemistry, and he's even accepting of Rebecca's vaginal infection at the time due to his mother being a gynecologist. Later, he leaves after Greg and Nathaniel show up on her patio and Josh – hearing the commotion – runs outside in nothing but underwear to try and scare away possible feral cats. However, it can be presumed that he and Rebecca are on good terms since he appears at her open mic performance in the series finale.

==== Trent Maddock ====
- Played by Paul Welsh

Rebecca's Harvard classmate, who has a romantic obsession with her. After Valencia calls him to verify Rebecca's story of him being her boyfriend, he begins to blackmail her into being his girlfriend. She sends him away, however, he comes back in season two, and Rebecca unknowingly takes his virginity. When he finds out about Josh and Rebecca's wedding, he stops the wedding by unleashing Rebecca's past onto Josh, which ultimately leads her to her suicide attempt. He returns again in season three, where he threatens to murder Nathaniel, sending cryptic messages such as, 'If I can't have you, no-one can'. Rebecca stops him by pushing him off a roof, leading her to get arrested for attempted murder.

==== Dr. Noelle Akopian ====
- Played by Michael Hyatt

Rebecca's therapist, whose advice she often ignores. Rebecca initially goes to meet with Dr. Akopian to get a prescription. After not being given one, she and Heather break into her house to steal the prescription pad. After being caught, Akopian states that she will not call the police if Rebecca agrees to undergo therapy. Noelle and Rebecca are seated next to each other on a flight to New York, where Rebecca has a dream in which Dr. Akopian (as a dream ghost) shows her the truth about her life in West Covina. When Rebecca later is near to figuring out the root of her problems, Josh proposes to her in Noelle's office, angering her. In season three, Rebecca goes to Dr. Akopian when she is diagnosed with Borderline Personality Disorder to try and change this. Instead, Dr. Akopian explains the reality of her diagnosis.

==== Father Brah ====
- Played by Rene Gube

Also known as Father Joseph, Father Brah is a priest who went to high school with Josh, Greg, White Josh, Hector and Valencia. He seemingly has no qualms about engaging in illegal activities such as smoking weed and gambling. He enjoys basketball and acts as Josh's confidant. He breaks the news to Rebecca that Josh is leaving her at the altar. At their tenth high school reunion it is shown that Valencia and Father Brah were secretly in love with each other, for whom she almost left Josh in high school.

==== Naomi Bunch ====
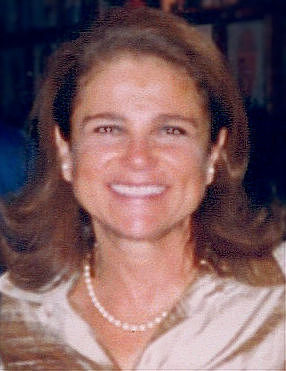
Tovah Feldshuh plays the role of Naomi, the protagonist's mother.

- Played by Tovah Feldshuh

Rebecca's mother who is critical, controlling and divorced. Naomi is not very accommodating towards Rebecca but is shown to care for her deeply.

==== George ====
- Played by Danny Jolles

A lawyer at Whitefeather & Associates, nobody can remember his name throughout seasons one and two. After he makes a strong impression by refusing to help Rebecca and Nathaniel out of an elevator, Nathaniel takes him on as a wingman. Rebecca also uses George, and threatens to kill herself and blame it on him if he doesn't co-operate. He went to high school with Josh, Greg, White Josh, Hector, Father Brah and Valencia, which none of them knew until their "tenth" high school reunion twelve years after graduation.

==== Tim ====
- Played by Michael McMillian

A lawyer at Whitefeather & Associates who is Canadian and forged his documents, therefore is in the United States illegally. Paula is aware of this and uses it to her advantage.

==== Maya ====
- Played by Esther Povitsky

An administrative assistant at Whitefeather & Associates who is openly bisexual and forms an alliance with Darryl. She is a chirpy girl, often criticized for her many generation-specific priorities and issues. Her slang is not understood by Darryl, whom she insists needs to be with White Josh. Maya has had at least one girlfriend, Joanne.

==== Karen ====
- Played by Stephnie Weir

A lawyer at Whitefeather & Associates, who is often called "Weird Karen". She has a sex toy company under the stage name of Angelique and shows up at Rebecca's 'gurl group party' dressed as Angelique, complete with fake French accent.

==== Samantha "Nicky" Warner ====
- Played by Britney Young.

First seen in "I'm Back at Camp with Josh!" as one of the campers. Returns in season four as one of Rebecca's fellow prisoners (convicted for an assault) at the women's county jail.

==== Jim ====
- Played by Burl Moseley

A lawyer at Whitefeather & Associates who claims to "have chemistry" with several female co-workers, including Rebecca.

==== Audra Levine ====
- Played by Rachel Grate

Rebecca's nemesis from her upbringing and life New York, who works on the Greater City Water case against her during season one. She is determined to prove that she is better than Rebecca by any means necessary and reappears in all seasons.

==== Marco Serrano ====
- Played by Robin Thomas

Greg's father, who smokes and drinks regularly despite having physical health problems. He gives Greg money to go to Emory University. He sleeps with Rebecca during a drunken one-night stand in season 3.

==== Kevin ====
- Played by Johnny Ray Meeks

Greg and Heather's overly accommodating boss at Home Base. Kevin takes off his shirt when he becomes stressed.

==== Silas Bunch ====
- Played by John Allen Nelson

Rebecca's father who abandoned her at her 12th birthday party after a heated argument with Naomi. She briefly visits his home in Santa Fe, New Mexico, soon after but is brought back home by Naomi, at Silas' behest. He is eventually flown out to West Covina for the wedding of Rebecca and Josh, by Nathaniel, ultimately asking Rebecca for money while he is there. He is told to leave soon after Josh leaves Rebecca at the altar.

==== Lourdes Chan ====
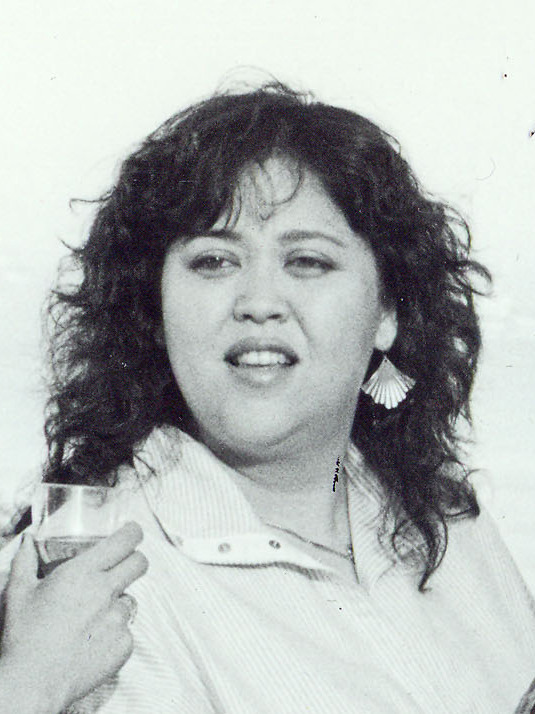
Amy Hill (who portrays Lourdes Chan) in 1983

- Played by Amy Hill

Josh's mother, who has shown to like Rebecca much more than Valencia.

==== Madison Whitefeather ====
- Played by Olivia Edward

Darryl and Stacy's daughter, who owns pet snails. She pushes Darryl and White Josh to break up over their disagreements.

==== Stacy Whitefeather ====
- Played by Allison Dunbar

Darryl's ex-wife and Madison's mother. Initially antagonistic, Rebecca helped Stacy and Darryl come to a consensus over Madison's custody arrangements. Stacy owned shares in Whitefeather and Associates until Bert bought them from her, and lent them to Rebecca.

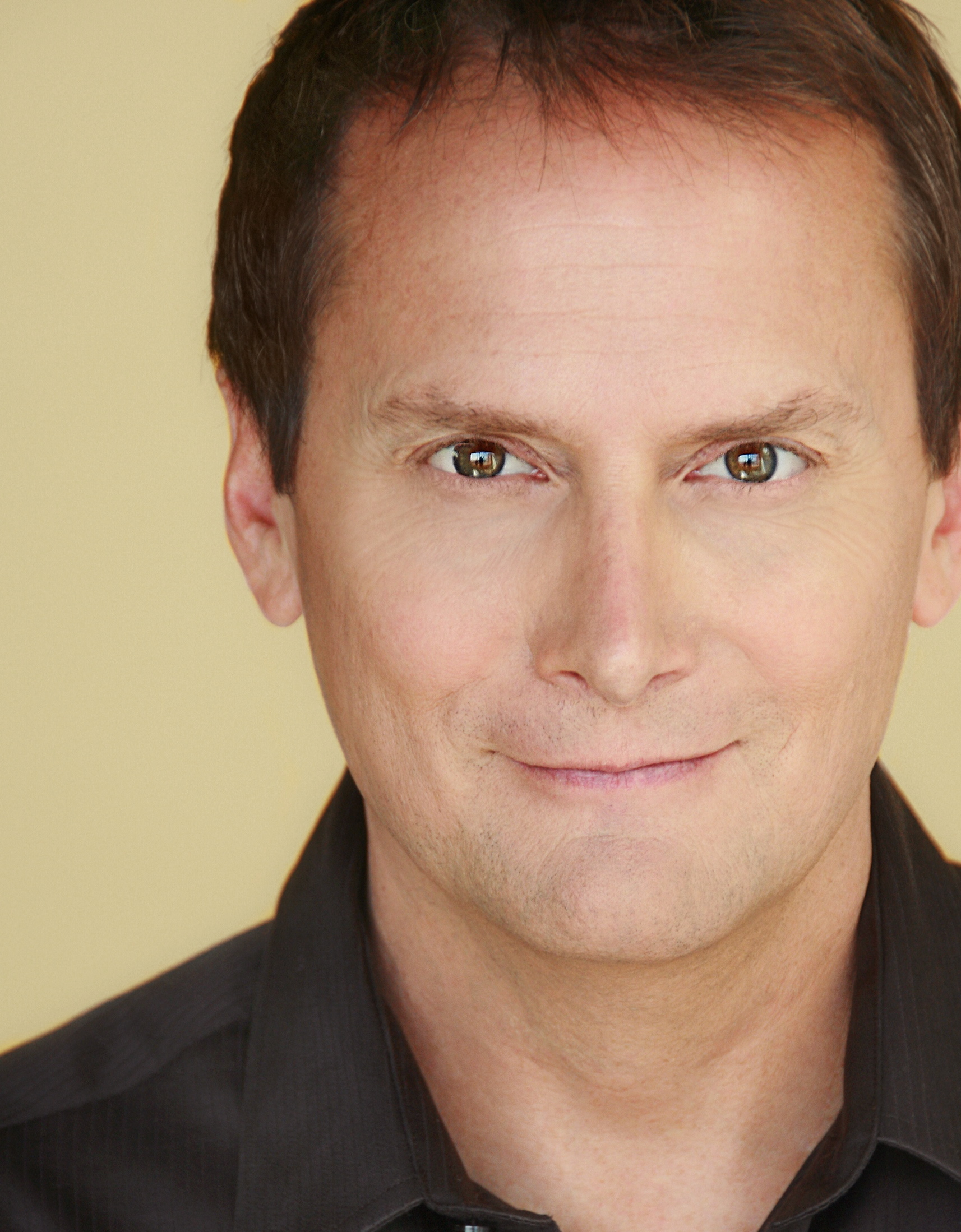
Michael Hitchcock plays the role of Bert, and is also an executive producer on the series.

==== Bert Buttenweiser ====
- Played by Michael Hitchcock

Bert is a conspiracy theorist who helps Rebecca in her case against Greater City Water. The case is thrown out when Audra Levine reveals that Bert is a diagnosed schizophrenic. He is later a member of Rebecca's BPD support group, having been misdiagnosed earlier. Bert loans Rebecca money for her to buy shares in Whitefeather & Associates and become the senior partner.

==== Chris ====
- Played by Jacob Guenther

A young boy who, due to his parents, often appears stuck at Home Base. He offers precocious commentary and is Greg's friend. Home Base is where Greg worked, Heather eventually finds a career and Josh's gang frequents.

==== Alex ====
- Played by Eugene Cordero

Josh's boss at the electronics store.

==== Brody ====
- Played by Benjamin Siemon

Aka "Grocery Clerk with Half an Eyelid". First appears at Rebecca's party in "I Hope Josh Comes to My Party". He is super talented and equally self-absorbed.

=== Introduced in season two ===
==== Mr. and Mrs. Davis ====
Heather's loving and permissive parents.

==== Sunil Odhav ====
- Played by Parveesh Cheena

Paula's friend from law school, with whom she replaces Rebecca. He keeps as a secret from his children that his wife committed suicide nine months ago. Sunil is shown to express a great interest in theatre and musicals. He befriends Jim, Maya & Tim when Paula begins to be mean to him, but then reveals it was only an act.

==== J. Castleman ====
- Played by Patton Oswalt

West Covina's graveyard security guard. He once bribed Paula into going on a date with him. In Season 4, it is implied that he's possibly a murderer.

==== David ====
- Played by Doug Mand

Audra Levine's hedge fund manager fiancée, later husband. Rebecca once had sex with him over winter holidays in college. Since then she has commented how tiny his penis is, and has called him a "rotten lay".

==== Estella ====
- Played by Debra Cardona

Hector's doting mother.

=== Introduced in season three ===
==== Dr. Davit Akopian ====
- Played by Piter Marek

Dr. Akopian's husband, and Darryl and White Josh's relationship counsellor. In season 4 he starts consulting Josh after he starts to think that he is mentally sick. Josh calls him "Dr. Man Akopian" to differentiate him from his wife and colleague, Noelle.

==== Mona ====
- Played by Lyndon Smith

Nathaniel's friend from Stanford Law, who met in a gay bar and began a relationship soon after. Throughout their whole relationship, Nathaniel sleeps with Rebecca and cheats on her. After Rebecca breaks it off, Nathaniel asks Mona to move in with her. Nathaniel ultimately breaks up with her in the season three finale to help Rebecca.

==== Dr. Daniel Shin ====
- Played by Jay Hayden

Rebecca's support group worker and in-patient therapist, who diagnoses her with Borderline Personality Disorder.

==== Lana ====
- Played by Arden Belle

A member of Rebecca's outpatient BPD therapy group. Lana is shown to have trouble expressing emotions.

==== Clarice ====
- Played by Carrie Clifford

A member of Rebecca's outpatient BPD therapy group.

==== Rick ====
- Played by Craig Gellis

A member of Rebecca's outpatient BPD therapy group.

==== Beth ====
- Played by Emma Willmann

Valencia's business partner and fiancée, first seen just before the season three time jump.

==== Hebecca Whitefeather ====
- Played by uncredited baby actors

Darryl's daughter (made using his sperm, Rebecca's donated egg, and surrogate-carried by Heather), born in the season three finale.

=== Introduced in season four ===
==== Fabulous Girl ====
- Played by Siri Miller

The young woman riding the bicycle in the season 4 opening titles segment, who is referred to as "Other Rebecca" (though at the end of her first appearance, she remarks that her real name is Debra) and ends the segment with various non-sequiturs.

==== AJ ====
- Played by Clark Moore

Rebecca's employee at Rebetzel's Pretzels. AJ is interested in becoming a lawyer some day.

==== April ====
- Played by Maribeth Monroe

Darryl's new love interest. Their relationship is initially threatened as their respective offspring are arch enemies. They eventually end up together, with the two having a baby together.

==== Julia ====
- Played by Toks Olagundoye

One of the senior partners at Paula's new law firm.

==== Hanifa Downey ====
- Played by Kalea Mcneill

One of Rebecca's fellow prisoners at the women's county jail, who is in prison for shoplifting. She and Paula end up forming a special bond as pro bono client and legal counsel.

== Special guests ==
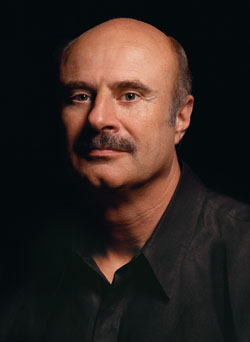
Dr. Phil appears as himself in seasons one and three.

=== B. J. Novak ===
- Played by himself

He owns and operates a drug factory and appears in season one and three.

=== Dr. Phil McGraw ===
- Played by himself

Dr. Phil appears in season one as a figment of Rebecca's hallucinations, and then once again in season three when Rebecca asks him for money.

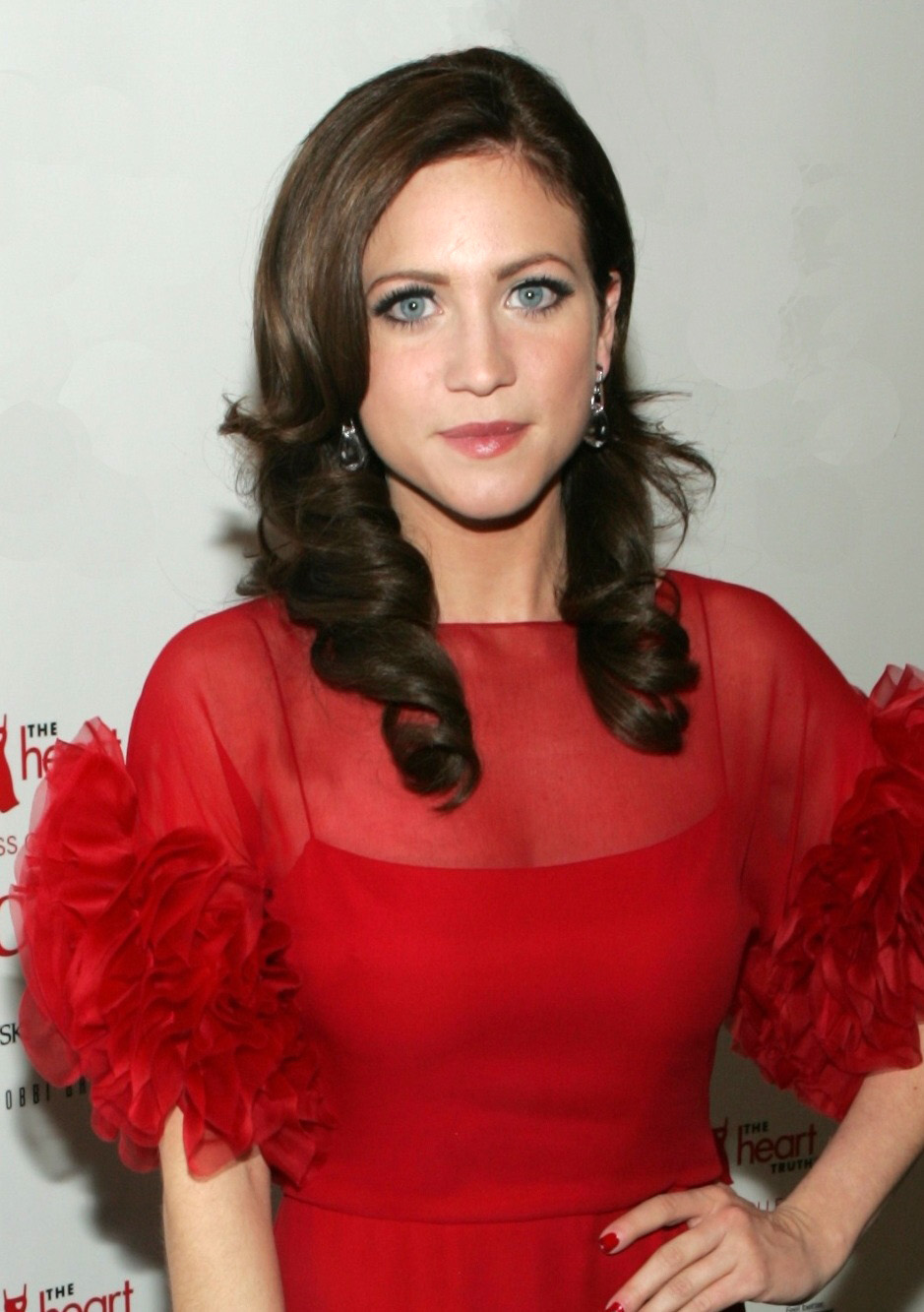
Brittany Snow plays the role of Anna Hicks.

=== Anna Hicks ===
- Played by Brittany Snow

Josh's girlfriend for part of season two. Rebecca and Valencia stalk her for days on end and accidentally run over her cat. She thinks Rebecca and Valencia are called Madge and Allegra, and breaks up with Josh after watching him walk a catwalk in a designer club, which leads him to run to Rebecca.

=== Robert Donnelly ===
- Played by Adam Kaufman

Rebecca's ex-professor and ex-fiancée, from Harvard. She burns his house down in a fit of rage after he dumps her.

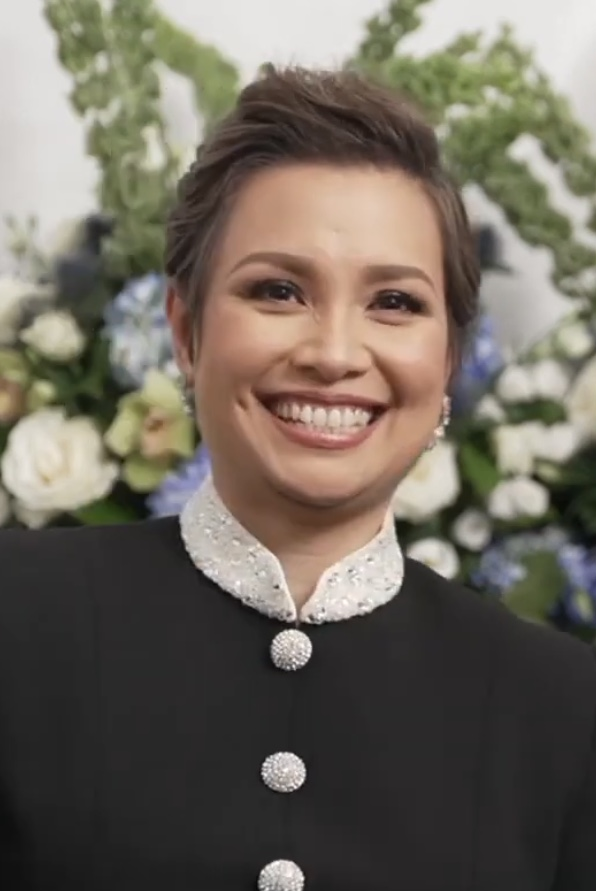
Lea Salonga appears as Aunt Myrna in season one.

=== Aunt Myrna ===
- Played by Lea Salonga

Josh's Aunt from the Philippines. She performs at Jayma's wedding, which is attended by Josh and Valencia and separately, Rebecca and Greg.

=== Rabbi Shari ===
- Played by Patti LuPone

Rebecca's rabbi, and Naomi's friend, from Scarsdale. She performs Rebecca's cousin's bat mitzvah, which Josh and Rebecca attend.

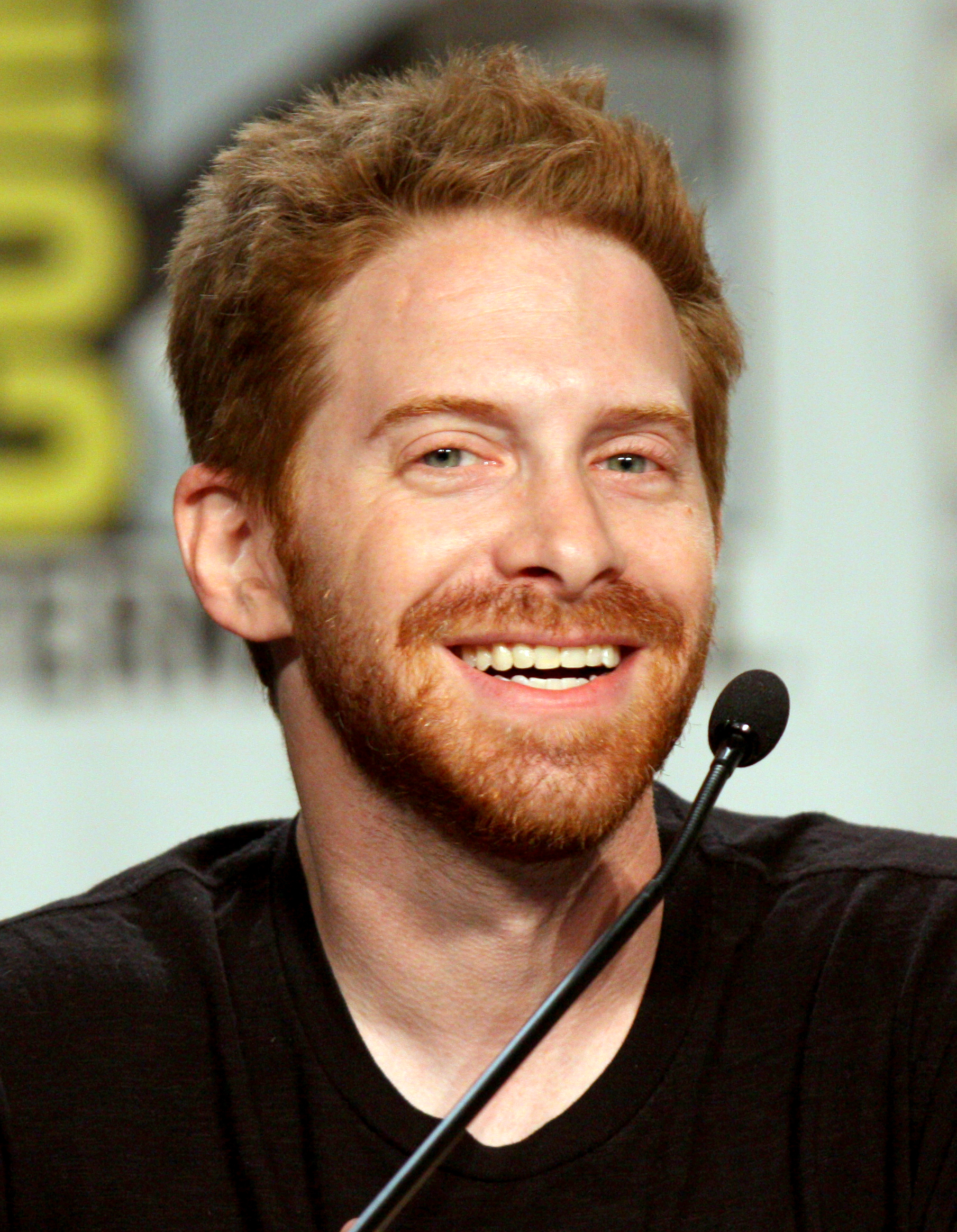
Seth Green appears as Patrick in season two.

=== Patrick ===
- Played by Seth Green

West Covina's delivery guy, who Rebecca has to deliver multiple wedding dresses to her for the wedding. Rebecca pushes her problems onto him.

=== Cornelia Wigfield ===
- Played by Bayne Gibby

A lawyer, who replaces Rebecca at Whitefeather, shortly before her suicide attempt. Darryl, Jim & Maya project their feelings about Rebecca onto her.

=== Josh Groban ===
- Played by himself

He appears as himself in one of Rebecca's fantasy musical numbers.

=== Tucker Bunch ===
- Played by Luca Padovan

Rebecca's younger half-brother who shares quite a few of his sister's personality traits (though they might be fake since Tucker had read Rebecca's diary).

=== Elayne Boosler ===
- Played by herself

She and Rebecca's mother, Naomi Bunch, are long time frenemies, although Naomi implies to others that they are close friends.

=== Bernie ===
- Played by "Weird Al" Yankovic

He owns and operates a hot air ballooning company.
