= Crazy Ex-Girlfriend season 3 =

Crazy Ex-Girlfriend
- Season 3
- Promotional poster
- Starring: Rachel Bloom; Vincent Rodriguez III; Donna Lynne Champlin; Pete Gardner; Vella Lovell; Gabrielle Ruiz; David Hull; Scott Michael Foster
- No. of episodes: 13

Release
- Original network: The CW
- Original release: October 13, 2017 – February 16, 2018

Season chronology
- ← Previous; Season 2 Next → Season 4

The third season of Crazy Ex-Girlfriend premiered on The CW on October 13, 2017 and ran for 13 episodes until February 16, 2018. The season stars Rachel Bloom as Rebecca Bunch, a distraught young woman who is dealing with the fallout of being left at the altar. Vincent Rodriguez III, Donna Lynne Champlin, Pete Gardner, Vella Lovell, Gabrielle Ruiz, David Hull, and Scott Michael Foster co-star.

== Cast ==
Main

- Rachel Bloom as Rebecca Bunch
- Vincent Rodriguez III as Josh Chan (Note: Rodriguez plays Colin Crowley in the first episode of the season.)
- Donna Lynne Champlin as Paula Proctor
- Pete Gardner as Darryl Whitefeather
- Vella Lovell as Heather Davis
- Gabrielle Ruiz as Valencia Perez
- David Hull as Josh "White Josh" Wilson
- Scott Michael Foster as Nathaniel Plimpton III

Recurring

- Gina Gallego as Mrs. Hernandez
- Erick Lopez as Hector
- Esther Povitsky as Maya
- Michael McMillian as Tim
- Steve Monroe as Scott Proctor
- Burl Moseley as Jim
- Danny Jolles as George
- Jacob Guenther as Chris
- Johnny Ray Meeks as Kevin
- Amy Hill as Lourdes Chan
- Steele Stebbins as Tommy Proctor
- Zayne Emory as Brendan Proctor
- Jay Hayden as Dr. Daniel Shin
- Michael Hyatt as Dr. Noelle Akopian
- Michael Hitchcock as Bert
- Lyndon Smith as Mona
- Paul Welsh as Trent Maddock

Guest

- Piter Marek as Dr. Davit Akopian
- Ava Acres as Young Rebecca
- Rory O'Malley as Jarl
- Alberto Issac as Joseph Chan
- Eugene Cordero as Alex
- Robin Thomas as Marco Serrano
- Josh Groban as himself
- Bayne Gibby as Cornelia Wigfield
- Tovah Feldshuh as Naomi Bunch
- Rachel Grate as Audra Levine
- David Grant Wright as Nathaniel Plimpton II
- Susan Blakely as Gigi Plimpton
- Eddie Pepitone as Bob O'Brien
- Olivia Edward as Madison Whitefeather
- Benjamin Siemon as Brody
- Hunter Stiebel as Marty
- Sofia Marie Gonzales as Ally
- Dr. Phil as himself
- B. J. Novak as himself
- Parvesh Cheena as Sunil Odhav

== Episodes ==
Every song listed is performed by Rebecca, except where indicated. Also, the Josh name is dropped from the episode titles after "Josh Is Irrelevant."

No. overall	No. in season	Title	Directed by	Written by	Original release date	US viewers (millions)
32	1	"Josh's Ex-Girlfriend Wants Revenge."	Erin Ehrlich	Rachel Bloom & Aline Brosh McKenna	October 13, 2017	0.62
The season picks up two weeks after the season 2 finale where Josh left Rebecca at the altar. After spending that time off the grid in a hotel, Rebecca teams up with Paula, Valencia, and Heather try to devise a plan to take him down. Rebecca decides to make a fake sex-tape with a Josh look-alike, and hires an actor to play Josh and ruin his reputation. When Paula puts a stop to the plan, she ropes the others into suing Josh for emotional distress. Meanwhile, Darryl tries to help White Josh take off his protein bar business. Songs: "Where's Rebecca Bunch?" (sung by the cast); "Let's Generalize About Men" (sung by Rebecca, Paula, Valencia, & Heather)
33	2	"To Josh, With Love."	Kabir Akhtar	Rachel Specter & Audrey Wauchope	October 20, 2017	0.60
Rebecca schemes Nathaniel into her plan to take Josh down by promising him sex in exchange for him destroying Josh, but he takes it too far by trying to murder Josh's grandfather and almost getting his father deported. As Rebecca realizes she didn't want to hurt Josh but confront him for what he did to her, she goes to the church during mass in her wedding dress and tells him everything that she has done to try to make them get together, ruining their chances at a lawsuit. At Whitefeather & Associates, Tim struggles with learning he is unable to give his wife an orgasm. Songs: "I've Got My Head In The Clouds" (sung by Josh); "Strip Away My Conscience"; "The Buzzing From The Bathroom" (sung by Tim); "After Everything You Made Me Do (That You Didn't Ask For)"
34	3	"Josh Is A Liar."	Stuart McDonald	Michael Hitchcock	October 27, 2017	0.56
Rebecca tricks Paula into stopping the lawsuit, saying she believes the case is too weak rather than telling her about how she revealed everything to Josh. Heather is forced to graduate from college. Josh quits priest-school and tries to tell White Josh and Hector about Rebecca; however, they don't believe him as she submits an article about him to a news blog, claiming that he hates gay people and is racist, among other things. Josh retaliates by reading the file Trent gave him, learning about her arrest for attempted arson and time spent at a mental hospital. As he and Father Brah meet with Paula to tell her about the content of the file, Rebecca figures out what is happening and convinces Nathaniel to flee town with her. As they try to leave, Paula, Heather, Valencia, and Darryl come through the door and stop them. Songs: "The Moment Is Me" (sung by Heather); "I Go To The Zoo" (sung by Nathaniel)
35	4	"Josh's Ex-Girlfriend Is Crazy."	Joseph Kahn	Rachel Bloom & Aline Brosh McKenna	November 3, 2017	0.65
Rebecca unsuccessfully tries to get Nathaniel to ignore the group and take her to Rome; though the group insists that they're trying to help her, Rebecca, feeling threatened, lashes out at everyone and runs off. Irate at Josh revealing her past, she goes to his house and harasses him throughout the night. Not wanting her friends to find her, she rents a room at a youth hostel with a Danish roommate, Yarl, to who she rants her life issues. The next day, Rebecca gets Josh suspended from his job by planting stolen items in his locker before kidnapping his mother and taking her to a carnival. After finding them, Josh demands Rebecca to never contact him or his family again. Meanwhile, as the group (along with White Josh and Hector) searches for Rebecca, Paula asks Valencia and Heather if she is a bad mother, while Darryl discusses having a baby with White Josh. A defeated Rebecca goes to a bar and receives a butt-dial from Greg; now even more heartbroken, she spots his dad at the bar and ends up sleeping with him. After Paula reaches out to Rebecca's mom, Rebecca gets a phone call from her and agrees to move back to New York. Songs: "Scary Scary Sexy Lady"; "The End of the Movie" (sung by Josh Groban)
36	5	"I Never Want to See Josh Again."	Stuart McDonald	Jack Dolgen	November 10, 2017	0.66
Feeling there is nothing for her anymore in West Covina, a depressed Rebecca resigns from the firm and goes home to New York to visit her mother, Naomi. Naomi finds out Rebecca has been researching ways to kill herself and scared for her safety, slips her some anti-anxiety medication without her consent. Meanwhile, in an attempt to move on from Rebecca, Nathaniel instantly hires a replacement, Cornelia (Bayne Gibby); he, Darryl, Jim, and Maya project their issues with Rebecca onto her, harassing her to the point that she quits. Paula takes a vacation with her family to a resort, which is ruined when Nathaniel and Cornelia show up, shortly followed by the others. Rebecca finds out about Naomi drugging her and after a brief confrontation with her, sneaks away on a plane back to California. While in the air, Rebecca breaks down realizing she doesn't want to return to West Covina and attempts suicide by overdosing on her mother's medication. Songs:"Maybe She's Not Such A Heinous Bitch After All"; "I Feel Like This Isn't About Me" (sung by Cornelia)
37	6	"Josh Is Irrelevant."	Max Winkler	Rachel Bloom, Aline Brosh McKenna & Ilana Peña	November 17, 2017	0.66
A hospitalized Rebecca begins recovering from her suicide attempt. Paula, Valencia, and Heather (accompanied by Hector) all rally around her for support. Valencia vlogs about Rebecca's recovery and begins to turn it about herself, which annoys Heather. Josh shows up to check on Rebecca but is thrown out by the others. Nathaniel tries to deal with what happened by seeing his family and processing his mother's own suicide attempt he witnessed as a child. The hospital psychiatrist diagnoses Rebecca with Borderline personality disorder; Rebecca takes this to Dr. Akopian to dispute the diagnosis before realizing it fits her perfectly. Nathaniel finally meets with Rebecca and gives her roses from his mother. Darryl haphazardly returns home early from a yurt after hearing about Rebecca and proclaims how he could kill Josh for what he did to her. In response, Rebecca tells him and the group that she's finally willing to get healthy and has officially moved on from him; Josh overhears this from outside and leaves without wishing Rebecca well. Songs: "A Diagnosis"; "This Is My Movement" (sung by Valencia)
38	7	"Getting Over Jeff."	Stuart McDonald	Erin Ehrlich	December 8, 2017	0.63
Paula goes to Buffalo to help her dad while her mom is out of town; Rebecca tags along and forms a bond with Paula's dad. While grocery shopping, Paula bumps into her ex, Jeff Chanington, and the two catch up. Rebecca and Paula's dad get drunk, and Rebecca starts to sext Nathaniel. Josh gets a job at Home Base and starts to flirt with a customer, until he gets a zit on his chin, which evolves into a staph infection. Madison pressures Darryl into breaking up with White Josh. Songs: "First Penis I Saw" (sung by Paula); "My Friend’s Dad" (sung by Rebecca & Paula's Dad (Eddie Pepitone))
39	8	"Nathaniel Needs My Help!"	Jude Weng	Rachel Specter & Audrey Wauchope	January 5, 2018	0.69
Paula and Darryl begin their search for an egg donor. Paula believes she has found the perfect candidate, and stalks her into releasing her eggs to Darryl; however, she blackmails Paula into giving her money. Rebecca's obsession turns from Josh to Nathaniel, and she goes to her therapist for advice. Rebecca dives into Nathaniel's childhood and ropes George into helping her stall his father - they follow Nathaniel's dad to a house where they find him with a girl who they suspect is Nathaniel's sister. Rebecca goes to extreme lengths to get the two to meet, when it turns out that the girl's mother is only Nathaniel's dad's secretary and he is helping pay for her tuition. Darryl's fertilization is unsuccessful, leading Darryl to check if his sperm still is capable of producing a child. Songs: "My Sperm is Healthy" (sung by Darryl); "Get Your Ass Out of My House" (sung by Lourdes)
40	9	"Nathaniel Gets the Message!"	Kabir Akhtar	Elisabeth Kiernan Averick	January 12, 2018	0.66
Realizing she's falling into her toxic habits, Rebecca breaks off her relationship with Nathaniel, who in turn befriends White Josh after being similarly dumped by Darryl. The two try to exercise their pain away, after they finish working out, they go to a gay bar. They get angered by a group of girls on a bachelorette party, who proclaim men with abs don't have problems. Rebecca persuades Valencia to let her tag along with her to her new clients' engagement party. Darryl's second fertilization attempt fails, leaving him defeated as he won't have enough money for another year to try again. Rebecca offers to donate her egg to Darryl. Songs: "Without Love You Can Save the World" (sung by the cast); "Fit Hot Guys Have Problems Too" (sung by Nathaniel, White Josh, & Josh)
41	10	"Oh, Nathaniel, It's On!"	Jude Weng	Sono Patel	January 26, 2018	0.65
Still upset by the breakup, Nathaniel refuses to give Rebecca her job back. Angry and flustered by the hormones she's taking to donate her egg to Darryl, Rebecca teams up with the rest of the office to reclaim Darryl's ex-wife's shares of the law firm. While inebriated on hormones, Rebecca briefly orders a hit on Nathaniel's new girlfriend, Mona. Kevin enrolls Heather in a diversity training program, where she becomes the manager of Home Base. Heather offers to be the surrogate for Rebecca and Darryl's child. After successfully claiming the shares and becoming a name partner at Whitefeather, Rebecca makes amends with Nathaniel and starts an affair with him. Songs: "He's The New Guy"; "Horny Angry Tango" (sung by Rebecca & Nathaniel)
42	11	"Nathaniel and I Are Just Friends!"	Erin Ehrlich	Rene Gube	February 2, 2018	0.62
Rebecca and Nathaniel continually have sex behind Nathaniel's girlfriend's back. Paula realizes how hated she is in the office and asks Sunil to come in and help her; however, she is the same with Sunil, which makes him turn on Paula with Tim, Maya, and Jim. The timeline jumps forward eight months; an exhausted Heather is near the end of her pregnancy, Valencia has a girlfriend, Rebecca and Nathaniel are still having their affair, and White Josh is back from volunteering in Mexico. Paula figures out her actions and apologizes to Sunil for being cruel towards him. Guilty of cheating and scared of relapsing into her old ways, Rebecca breaks off her affair with Nathaniel. Songs: "This Session is Going to Be Different" (sung by Dr. Akopian); "Face Your Fears (Reprise)"
43	12	"Trent?!"	Stuart McDonald	Dan Gregor & Doug Mand	February 9, 2018	0.60
As soon as Rebecca begins to feel she is in control of her life, Trent appears and threatens to blackmail her into being his girlfriend (threatening to release evidence of her placing a hit on Mona). Rebecca asks Paula for her help finding out what Trent is hiding. Paula initially refuses, so Rebecca lies to her and tells her that Trent has dirt on her as well. They find a storage locker full of photos of Rebecca and some of her possessions. They open a hidden crate and get blasted with green slime. Rebecca returns home and Trent tells her she failed his 'love test', and Rebecca yells at him that she will never love him, finally convincing him to leave her home. Meanwhile, Valencia and Beth host a birthday party for a teenage girl with Josh as the DJ, which goes terribly wrong until Valencia allows Josh to play recent music. Nathaniel asks Mona to move in with him after seeing Rebecca and Trent and believing they were a couple. Songs: "Buttload of Cats"; "I'm Just A Boy In Love" (sung by Trent); "Period Sex (Reprise III)" (sung by Trent); "Back In Action" (sung by Rebecca & Paula)
44	13	"Nathaniel Is Irrelevant."	Aline Brosh McKenna	Aline Brosh McKenna & Michael Hitchcock	February 16, 2018	0.60
Rebecca is haunted by visions of Trent, which she takes to her BPD support group, who figure out that the visions are a manifestation of her guilt. This leads Rebecca to tell Josh, Paula, and Nathaniel all the bad things she has done regarding them. Paula becomes visibly upset after learning of Rebecca's lie regarding Trent and tells Rebecca they are done for good. Rebecca then runs into the real Trent who threatens her. Meanwhile, Heather goes into labor and Darryl rambles to her. She sees that he misses White Josh and invites him to the hospital to reconcile with Darryl. The two agree to be friends. Trent sneaks into Nathaniel and Mona's housewarming party and sends Rebecca several Instagram stories threatening to murder Nathaniel. Rebecca rushes to the party and after finding Trent holding a knife over Nathaniel, she pushes him off the roof of the apartment complex, severely injuring him in the process. As a result, Rebecca is arrested and charged with attempted second-degree murder. Nathaniel appears as her lawyer and tells her to plead not guilty by reason of insanity. Rebecca takes his advice on board, but when she sees Paula during her arraignment, she changes her mind and, deciding to face the consequences of her actions, pleads guilty. Songs: "Miracle Of Birth" (sung by Paula); "Nothing Is Ever Anyone's Fault" (sung by Rebecca & Nathaniel)

== Production ==
The series was renewed for a third season on January 8, 2017. On April 5, 2017, it was announced that David Hull and Scott Michael Foster, who portray White Josh and Nathaniel respectively, were promoted to series regulars for season three.

=== Music ===
Each week, after an episode of Crazy Ex-Girlfriend aired, the soundtrack of that episode was released the next day.

The full season soundtrack was released on July 20, 2018. It includes all the songs of season three, sans "The End of the Movie" due to legal issues with Josh Groban's record deals. However, it adds a full demo of the same song from Adam Schlesinger, three additional demos including an "earnest version" of "The Moment is Me" sung by writing team member Ilana Peña and an unused title sequence, and the cut song "Settle For Her" featuring Scott Michael Foster.

== Reception ==
=== Critical response ===
The third season of Crazy Ex-Girlfriend has received critical acclaim from critics. On Rotten Tomatoes, it has a score of 96% and an average rating of 9.0/10, based on 23 reviews. The site's critic consensus states: "Crazy Ex-Girlfriend's brave third season doubles down on the crazy, with a compassionate, compelling exploration of mental illness that is as honest as it is hilarious."

=== Ratings ===
Viewership and ratings per episode of Crazy Ex-Girlfriend season 3
No.	Title	Air date	Rating/share (18–49)	Viewers (millions)
1	"Josh's Ex-Girlfriend Wants Revenge."	October 13, 2017	0.2/1	0.62
2	"To Josh, With Love."	October 20, 2017	0.2/1	0.60
3	"Josh Is A Liar."	October 27, 2017	0.2/1	0.56
4	"Josh's Ex-Girlfriend is Crazy."	November 3, 2017	0.2/1	0.65
5	"I Never Want to See Josh Again."	November 10, 2017	0.2/1	0.66
6	"Josh Is Irrelevant."	November 17, 2017	0.2/1	0.66
7	"Getting Over Jeff."	December 8, 2017	0.2/1	0.63
8	"Nathaniel Needs My Help!"	January 5, 2018	0.2/1	0.69
9	"Nathaniel Gets the Message!"	January 12, 2018	0.2/1	0.66
10	"Oh, Nathaniel, It's On!"	January 26, 2018	0.2/1	0.68
11	"Nathaniel and I Are Just Friends!"	February 2, 2018	0.2/1	0.62
12	"Trent?!"	February 9, 2018	0.2/1	0.60
13	"Nathaniel Is Irrelevant."	February 16, 2018	0.2/1	0.60
