= Crazy Ex-Girlfriend season 2 =

Crazy Ex-Girlfriend
- Season 2
- Promotional poster
- Starring: Rachel Bloom; Vincent Rodriguez III; Santino Fontana; Donna Lynne Champlin; Pete Gardner; Vella Lovell; Gabrielle Ruiz
- No. of episodes: 13

Release
- Original network: The CW
- Original release: October 21, 2016 – February 3, 2017

Season chronology
- ← Previous; Season 1 Next → Season 3

The second season of Crazy Ex-Girlfriend premiered on The CW on October 21, 2016 and ran for 13 episodes until February 3, 2017. The season stars Rachel Bloom as Rebecca Bunch, a young lawyer who finds herself pursuing a relationship with the object of her obsession, Josh Chan, as she continues her quest to find true happiness. Vincent Rodriguez III, Santino Fontana, Donna Lynne Champlin, Pete Gardner, Vella Lovell, and Gabrielle Ruiz co-star.

== Cast ==
Main

- Rachel Bloom as Rebecca Bunch
- Vincent Rodriguez III as Josh Chan
- Santino Fontana as Greg Serrano
- Donna Lynne Champlin as Paula Proctor
- Pete Gardner as Darryl Whitefeather
- Vella Lovell as Heather Davis
- Gabrielle Ruiz as Maria "Valencia" Perez

Recurring

- Eugene Cordero as Alex
- Gina Gallego as Mrs. Hernandez
- Jacob Guenther as Chris
- Amy Hill as Lourdes Chan
- David Hull as White Josh
- Erick Lopez as Hector
- Johnny Ray Meeks as Kevin
- Steve Monroe as Scott Proctor
- Elijah Nelson as Brendan Proctor
- Robin Thomas as Marco Serrano
- Rene Gube as Father Brah
- Michael McMillian as Tim
- Burl Moseley as Jim
- Michael Hyatt as Dr. Noelle Akopian
- Esther Povitsky as Maya
- Stephnie Weir as Karen
- Parvesh Cheena as Sunil Odhav
- Brittany Snow as Anna Hicks
- Danny Jolles as George
- Scott Michael Foster as Nathaniel Plimpton III
- Tovah Feldshuh as Naomi Bunch

Guest

- Yael Grobglas as Trina
- Paul Welsh as Trent Maddock
- Steele Stebbins as Tommy Proctor
- Patti LuPone as Rabbi Shari
- Rachel Grate as Audra Levine
- David Grant Wright as Nathaniel Plimpton II
- Seth Green as Patrick
- John Allen Nelson as Silas Bunch
- Alberto Issac as Joseph Chan
- Tess Paras and Coryn Mabalot as Jayma and Jastenity Chan
- Eric Michael Roy as the Santa Ana Winds (impersonating Frankie Valli)
- Patton Oswalt as J. Castleman

== Episodes ==
Every song listed is performed by Rebecca, except where indicated.

No. overall	No. in season	Title	Directed by	Written by	Original release date	US viewers (millions)
19	1	"Where Is Josh's Friend?"	Marc Webb	Rachel Bloom & Aline Brosh McKenna & Marc Webb	October 21, 2016	0.53
Three weeks after Rebecca confessed to Josh she moved to West Covina for him, Josh, having recently been evicted by Valencia after she broke up with him, ends up living with Rebecca, but sleeps on the couch to avoid any awkwardness. Meanwhile, Paula begins to realize her boundaries with Rebecca and sees the reality that Josh is not as into Rebecca as she is into him. Ever since his breakup, Greg has been off the radar for a while, but Rebecca and Paula discover him attending Alcoholics Anonymous. Songs: "Love Kernels"; "We Should Definitely Not Have Sex Right Now" (sung by Rebecca & Josh)
20	2	"When Will Josh See How Cool I Am?"	Jay Chandrasekhar	Rene Gube	October 28, 2016	0.45
Rebecca wants to hang out with Josh more. Greg tells his friends about his recovery, and Josh reveals to him that he and Rebecca are sleeping together. Paula hopes to get Rebecca to fill out her letter of recommendation. Songs: "Maybe This Dream" (sung by Paula); "Greg's Drinking Song" (sung by Greg); "I Could If I Wanted To (Reprise)" (sung by Greg); "Ping Pong Girl" (sung by Josh)
21	3	"All Signs Point to Josh... Or Is It Josh’s Friend?"	Stuart McDonald	Rachel Specter & Audrey Wauchope	November 4, 2016	0.54
Rebecca wonders whether she is meant to be with Josh or Greg. After a pregnancy scare that turns out to be her period, Josh breaks up with Rebecca again. Greg must decide whether to stay in West Covina or attend Emory University. Paula experiences her own pregnancy scare and has to make a decision, which Darryl unknowingly accelerates. Songs: "The Math of Love Triangles"; "Period Sex"
22	4	"When Will Josh and His Friend Leave Me Alone?"	Paul Briganti	Erin Ehrlich	November 11, 2016	0.53
After Greg leaves for Emory University, Rebecca is haunted by "memory spirits" of Josh and Greg, and decides to burn all of their possessions. When a YouTube video of her 911 call goes viral, Rebecca moves in with Heather and gets a makeover to become a candidate for a douche spokeswoman. Paula grapples with her pregnancy preventing her from going to law school. Songs: "It Was a Shit Show" (sung by Greg); "We Tapped That Ass" (sung by Greg & Josh); "Makey Makeover"
23	5	"Why Is Josh's Ex-Girlfriend Eating Carbs?"	Erin Ehrlich	Sono Patel	November 18, 2016	0.50
Rebecca and Valencia bond in the desert; At law school, Paula finds a new friend in Sunil and begins to question her friendship with Rebecca; Darryl discovers something surprising about White Josh that causes him to question their relationship. Songs: "Thought Bubbles" (sung by Josh); "Triceratops Ballet" (danced by Valencia, Rebecca, & Josh); "Thought Bubbles (Reprise)" (sung by Anna)
24	6	"Who Needs Josh When You Have a Girl Group?"	Stuart McDonald	Jack Dolgen	December 2, 2016	0.60
Rebecca organizes a girls' night in an attempt to get Paula to become part of her new girl group, but the evening takes a turn for the worse. Trent attempts to infiltrate Josh's friend group to get Rebecca to like him. Feeling left out from Rebecca's party, Darryl befriends Maya. Songs: "Friendtopia" (sung by Rebecca, Heather, & Valencia); "Trent is Getting Ready Song" (sung by Trent); "This Song Goes in a Loop Dee Loop" (sung by Rebecca); "Stuck in the Bathroom" (sung by Heather)
25	7	"Who's the Cool Girl Josh Is Dating?"	Jude Weng	Michael Hitchcock	December 9, 2016	0.54
Rebecca and Valencia find more than they bargained for when they investigate the new girl Josh has been dating; tensions rise between Paula and her husband, Scott, as Paula gets wrapped up in law school. Songs: "Research Me Obsessively" (sung by Anna); "Period Sex (Reprise)"; "Let Me Call You Sweetheart" (sung by the West Brovinas); "You Go First" (sung by Rebecca & Paula)
26	8	"Who Is Josh's Soup Fairy?"	Linda Mendoza	Rachel Specter & Audrey Wauchope	January 6, 2017	0.71
To mend fences with Paula, Rebecca offers to babysit Tommy, but her obsession with Josh distracts her. Paula's marriage hits a breaking point. Josh has a realization after getting dumped. Songs: "So Maternal"; "Duh!" (sung by Josh)
27	9	"When Do I Get to Spend Time with Josh?"	Kabir Akhtar	Rachel Bloom & Aline Brosh McKenna	January 6, 2017	0.63
When Darryl sells the law firm and several of Rebecca's co-workers' jobs are on the line, Rebecca must drop everything and save their jobs. Her new boss, Nathaniel, causes her to see Josh in a new light. Songs: "Who's the New Guy?" (sung by Paula, Tim (Michael McMillian), George, Maya, & Karen); "George's Turn" (sung by George)
28	10	"Will Scarsdale Like Josh's Shayna Punim?"	Alex Hardcastle	Dan Gregor & Doug Mand	January 13, 2017	0.55
When Rebecca and Josh go to Scarsdale to visit Rebecca's family, her worst nightmare comes true: Naomi ends up liking Josh. Rebecca begins to question whether Josh is the answer to all her problems. Back at Whitefeather and Associates, Darryl tries to exert power in the office as Nathaniel's reign of terror continues. Songs: "We'll Never Have Problems Again" (sung by Rebecca & Josh); "Period Sex (Reprise II)" (sung by Naomi); "Remember That We Suffered" (sung by Rabbi Shari (Patti LuPone), Naomi, & ensemble)
29	11	"Josh Is the Man of My Dreams, Right?"	Michael Patrick Jann	Elisabeth Kiernan Averick	January 20, 2017	0.57
The Santa Ana winds, aka the "devil winds", blow into West Covina. Rebecca, even though she is engaged to Josh, becomes attracted to Nathaniel. Paula and Darryl become better friends. Songs: "Santa Ana Winds" (sung by the Santa Ana Winds); "Let's Have Intercourse" (sung by Nathaniel); "You're My Best Friend (and I Know I'm Not Yours)" (sung by Darryl); "The Math of Love Triangles (Reprise)" (sung by Karen)
30	12	"Is Josh Free in Two Weeks?"	Alex Hardcastle	Katie Schwartz	January 27, 2017	0.59
Stressed out from planning her upcoming wedding by herself, Rebecca turns to her local delivery man, Patrick (Seth Green), for reassurance. Nathaniel offers a kind gesture to Rebecca after his dad visits the office. Songs: "Man Nap" (sung by Darryl, Tim, & Jim); "(Tell Me I'm Okay) Patrick"
31	13	"Can Josh Take a Leap of Faith?"	Aline Brosh McKenna	Aline Brosh McKenna	February 3, 2017	0.58
Rebecca's father makes a surprise appearance at her wedding, leading her to get her hopes up for the future. Josh senses that Rebecca is hiding something and has a revelation of his own. Rebecca and Paula join forces for a new venture. Songs: "What a Rush to be a Bride" (sung by Rebecca & Paula); "Rebecca's Reprise"

== Production ==
The series was renewed for a second season on March 11, 2017. On May 23, 2016, it was announced that Gabrielle Ruiz, who portrays Valencia, was promoted to series regular for season two. In November, 2016, it was announced that Santino Fontana would be departing the series, with episode four of the second season resulting as his last as a series regular.

=== Music ===
"Crazy Ex-Girlfriend: Original Television Soundtrack Season 2" was released on March 3, 2017. It includes all the songs of season two, alongside Bloom's a cappella rough demos of "Santa Ana Winds" and "Rebecca's Reprise" alongside Adam Schlesinger and Stephen M. Gold's demo version of "I'm Just a Girl in Love", and Jack Dolgen's rough demos of "Sex Toys" and "It's Not Difficult to Define Miss Douche", two songs that didn't make it onto the final cut on the show.

== Home media ==
The Warner Archive Collection released Season 2 as a manufacture-on-demand DVD exclusively to online retailers.

== Reception ==
=== Critical response ===
The second season of Crazy Ex-Girlfriend received critical acclaim from critics. On Rotten Tomatoes, it has a fresh rating of 100% based on 22 reviews, with a weighted average of 9.40/10. The site's critical consensus reads, "Crazy Ex-Girlfriend" remains delightfully weird, engaging, and even more courageous and confident in its sophomore outing." On Metacritic, the season has a score of 86 out of 100 based on 8 critics, indicating "universal acclaim".

=== Ratings ===
Viewership and ratings per episode of Crazy Ex-Girlfriend season 2
No.	Title	Air date	Rating/share (18–49)	Viewers (millions)
1	"Where is Josh's Friend?"	October 21, 2016	0.2/1	0.53
2	"When Will Josh See How Cool I Am?"	October 28, 2016	0.2/1	0.45
3	"All Signs Point to Josh... Or is it Josh's Friend?"	November 4, 2016	0.2/1	0.54
4	"When Will Josh and His Friend Leave Me Alone?"	November 11, 2016	0.2/1	0.53
5	"Why is Josh's Ex-Girlfriend Eating Carbs?"	November 18, 2016	0.2/1	0.50
6	"Who Needs Josh When You Have a Girl Group?"	December 2, 2016	0.2/1	0.60
7	"Who's the Cool Girl Josh is Dating?"	December 9, 2016	0.2/1	0.54
8	"Who Is Josh's Soup Fairy?"	January 6, 2017	0.2/1	0.71
9	"When Do I Get to Spend Time with Josh?"	January 6, 2017	0.2/1	0.63
10	"Will Scarsdale Like Josh's Shayna Punim?"	January 13, 2017	0.2/1	0.55
11	"Josh is the Man of My Dreams, Right?"	January 20, 2017	0.2/1	0.57
12	"Is Josh Free in Two Weeks?"	January 27, 2017	0.2/1	0.59
13	"Can Josh Take a Leap of Faith?"	February 3, 2017	0.2/1	0.58
