= Pacific Conservatory of the Performing Arts =

School in Santa Maria, California, U.S.

Pacific Conservatory of the Performing Arts (PCPA) is a presenting and training professional residential theatre company in Santa Maria, California, offering a two-year acting and technical theatre conservatory program, operating out of Allan Hancock College.

== Degree ==
PCPA offers a two-year vocational certificate program which combines lectures, labs, and classes with practical hands-on training where students will mount a fully realized production. Conservatory students are mentored by practicing professionals in the classroom.

Performing students are offered no elective subject and have classes six days of the week. Among the classes offered are: acting, voice, movement, musical theater ensemble, Shakespeare, theatre history, stage combat. The technical theatre students examine all aspects of production, enabling them to develop as designers, craftspeople and technicians. Areas of study include stagecraft, lighting, sound, drawing and rendering, costuming and scene painting.

== Alumni ==
Former members of the school include:

- Robin Williams
- Mercedes Ruehl
- Kathy Bates
- Jeffrey Combs
- Harry Hamlin
- Jeff McCarthy
- Kelly McGillis
- James Marsters
- Boyd Gaines
- Zac Efron
- Scott Aukerman
- Vincent Rodriguez III
- Powers Boothe
- Richard Riehle

== Support ==
PCPA receives operating funds from the Allan Hancock College, an endowment, ticket revenue, and the fundraising efforts of the PCPA Foundation to secure corporate and individual donations.
