= American Spirit Dance Company =

The American Spirit Dance Company is an American dance company in association with Oklahoma City University. It has been founded 1981 and is directed by Professor Jo Rowan, chairman of the Oklahoma City University Dance Department. Its purpose is to demonstrate the unique United States' contributions to dance of jazz dance, tap dance, and musical theater.

== Noteworthy performances ==
- The American Spirit Dance Company took part in the opening ceremonies of the 2007 Tournament of Roses Parade.
- The American Spirit Dance Company was invited to perform in 1999, 2006, and 2008 for the Flo-Bert Awards tap dance awards.
