= Gabrielle Ruiz =

American actress (born 1984)

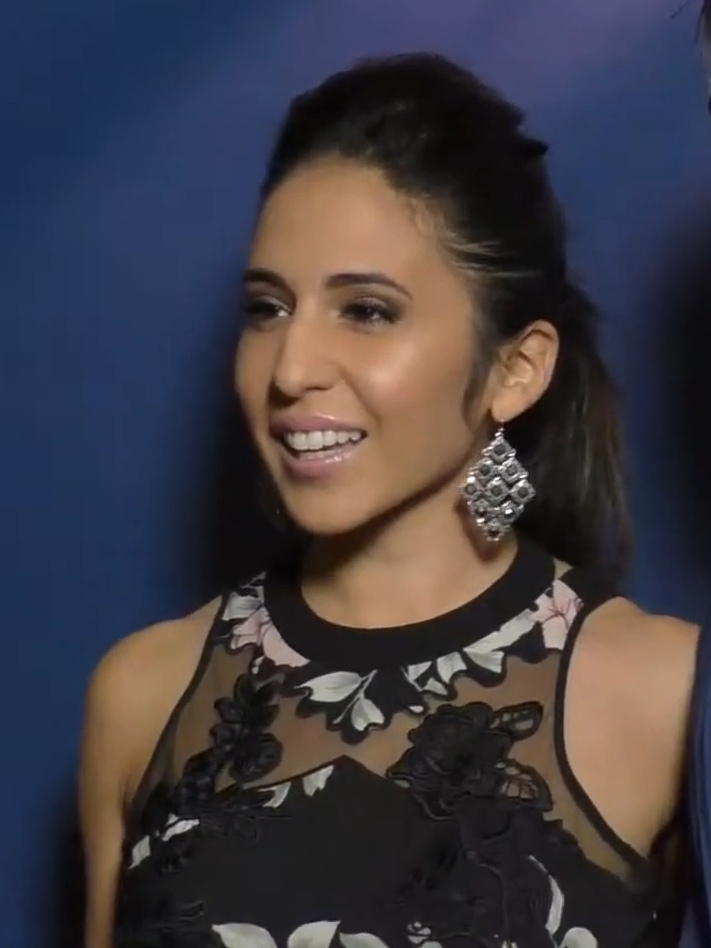
- Ruiz in 2016
- Born: December 12, 1984 (age 41); Edinburg, Texas, United States
- Education: Oklahoma City University
- Occupation: Actress
- Spouse: Philip Pisanchyn (m. 2016)
- Children: 2
- Website: www.gabrielleruiz.net

Gabrielle Ruiz (born December 12, 1984) is an American actress best known for playing the role of Valencia Perez on The CW musical comedy-drama series Crazy Ex-Girlfriend. Prior to Crazy Ex-Girlfriend, she performed in several Broadway musicals.

== Early life and education ==
Gabrielle was born to Eduardo and Sylvia Ruiz in Edinburg, Texas. Both parents are of Mexican heritage. She discovered her love of performing at a young age through dance. She was trained in dance at Melba's School of Dance and the Texas Association for Teachers of Dance. She also took vocal lessons and was part of the Texas All-State Choir. She attended public schools through high school, and graduated from Oklahoma City University with a Bachelor of Fine Arts in Dance Performance in 2007. While in college she was a member of the American Spirit Dance Company, OCU Rhythms, numerous musicals, work-study, and the Alpha Phi women's fraternity.

== Career ==
After college, Ruiz landed various roles on both television and Broadway. Her breakthrough role was playing Valencia Perez on The CW comedy-drama series Crazy Ex-Girlfriend. Lin-Manuel Miranda, the creator of Hamilton, saw her perform in his musical In the Heights and referred her to the CXG show producers. On the basis of his recommendation, she got an audition and then landed the part.

== Personal life ==
On August 4, 2016, Ruiz married Philip Pisanchyn in a small private ceremony at a villa on Saint Martin. They live in New York City and occasionally Los Angeles. On April 28, 2021 she gave birth to a girl, Mercedes.

== Filmography ==
Film roles
Year	Title	Role	Notes
2014	Sex, Love, and Salsa	Maria	Indie Film Award, Best Featured Actress
2024	Guns & Moses	Brenda Navarro	

Television roles
Year	Title	Role	Notes
2007	One Life to Live	Principal Dancer	Episode #1.9956
2009	Sesame Street	Singing Electrician	Episode: "Y a Quest, Y Not?"
2013	Law & Order: SVU	Tina	Episode: "Deadly Ambition"
2015–2019	Crazy Ex-Girlfriend	Valencia Perez	Recurring role (season 1); Main role (seasons 2-4)
2016	Orange is the New Black	Singing Inmate #2	Episode: "Power Suit"
2018	Alone Together	Linda	Episode: "Pop-Up"
2019	Modern Family	Anne	Episode: "Snapped"
2019	The Filth	Frantic Shopper	Episode: "Filthy Day Jobs"
2019	Better Things	Herself	Episode: "The Unknown"
2020	Action Nat and the Cat	Bell	Episode: "The Field Trip"
2020–2024	Star Trek: Lower Decks	Lieutenant Lemonts / Ensign Castro / T'Lyn	Voice, 17 episodes
2021	Mr. Mayor	Emily Biyata	Episode: "Dodger Day"
2021–present	Spidey and His Amazing Friends	Rio Morales	

Broadway/national tour roles
Title	Role	Theater performed
If/Then	Featured, understudy Anne & Elena	Richard Rodgers Theater
Evita	Featured	Marquis Theater
In the Heights	Carla, understudy Nina & Vanessa	Richard Rodgers Theater
A Chorus Line	Diana Morales	Third National Tour
