= Emma Willmann =

American comedian

- Born: December 20, 1985 (age 40); Blue Hill, Maine, U.S.
- Education: Simmons College; The New School
- Occupations: Stand-up comedian; actress
- Years active: 2016–present
- Website: iamemmawillmann.com

Emma Willmann is an American stand-up comedian and actress. She made her televised stand up debut on The Late Show with Stephen Colbert. Willmann had a recurring role as "Beth" on The CW series Crazy Ex-Girlfriend.

== Early life ==
Emma Willmann was born in Blue Hill, Maine, where she went to grade school and high school. She is a graduate of George Stevens Academy and currently resides in New York City. Willmann also graduated from Simmons College and received a master's degree from The New School. Willmann is a lesbian.

== Career ==
=== Stand-up comedy ===
Willmann was featured as a New Face at the Just for Laughs Festival in Montreal in 2016. Time Out New York has recognized her as one of the 10 funniest women in New York City. She performed stand-up on the Seeso series Night Train with Wyatt Cenac.

Willmann appears on Netflix's The Comedy Lineup, where she performs a 15-minute stand-up set.

=== Acting ===
In 2018, Willmann joined the cast of The CW series Crazy Ex-Girlfriend. She played Beth, Valencia's girlfriend and business partner. She also plays a version of herself on HBO's Crashing.

=== Radio and podcasting ===
Willmann hosted The Check Spot on Sirius XM's Raw Dog Comedy, and co-hosted the podcasts Inside the Closet with Matteo Lane and Secret Keepers Club with Carly Aquilino. She currently hosts the podcast Ask Men Anything for Betches.
