= Vincent Rodriguez III =

American actor (born 1982)

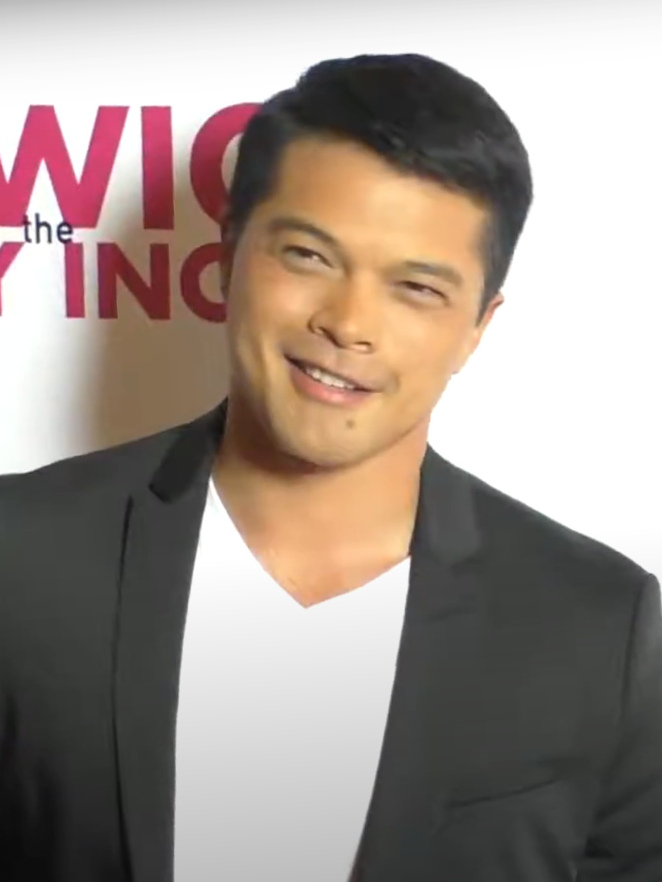
- Rodriguez in 2016
- Born: August 10, 1982 (age 44); San Francisco, California, U.S.
- Education: Pacific Conservatory of the Performing Arts
- Occupation: Actor
- Years active: 2006–present
- Spouse: Gregory Wright (m. 2015)

Vincent Rodriguez III (born August 10, 1982) is an American stage and television actor. Rodriguez is known for playing the male lead role of Josh Chan in The CW comedy-drama series Crazy Ex-Girlfriend.

== Early and personal life ==
Rodriguez was born in San Francisco to Filipino parents and grew up in nearby Daly City. He is of Filipino, Spanish, and Chinese background. He has three older sisters, all born in Manila. In 2003, he graduated from the Pacific Conservatory of the Performing Arts. He is also trained in martial arts. He moved to New York City in 2005 and appeared often as an ensemble cast member in regional theatre productions. He also teaches annually at drama schools. On television he had bit roles on The Onion News Network and Hostages before landing his breakthrough role in 2015, when he was cast as Josh Chan, the romantic lead in Crazy Ex-Girlfriend.

Since 2015, Rodriguez has been married to Gregory Wright. As a gay actor, his performance as the straight lead in Crazy Ex-Girlfriend has received praise.

== Filmography ==
=== Television ===
Year	Title	Role	Notes
2011	The Onion News Network	Asian Tucker Hope	Episode: "Fifth Anniversary"
2014	Hostages	Aide	Episode: "Endgame"
2015	Donny!	Tap Show Host	Episode: "Little League Dads Gone Wild!"
2015–2019	Crazy Ex-Girlfriend	Josh Chan	Series regular; 60 episodes
2017	Designated Survivor	Congressman Saldua	Episode: "Misalliance"
2017	Adam Ruins Everything	Derek	Episode: "Adam Ruins the Hospital"
2018	Another Period	Chang Bunker	Episode: "Lucky Chang's"
2019	Insatiable	Detective Rudy Cruz	Recurring role; 7 episodes (season 2)
2021	Kenan	Ron Sherman-Willis	Episode: "Hard News"
2021	I Heart Arlo	Ansel Beauregard	Voice role; 9 episodes
2021–2023	With Love	Henry Cruz	Main role; 11 episodes
2022	Home Economics	Simon	2 episodes
2023	The Ghost and Molly McGee	Jeff	Voice role; 5 episodes
2023	Christmas on Cherry Lane	Zian	Hallmark Movie
2024	Season's Greetings From Cherry Lane	Zian	Hallmark Movie

=== Film ===
Year	Title	Role	Notes
2019	White Snake	Little General	English dub
2020	Ne Zha	Li Jung	English dub
2021	Arlo the Alligator Boy	Ansel Beauregard	Voice role
2025	Ne Zha 2	Li Jung	English dub
TBA	Thud †		Post-production

=== Video games ===
Year	Title	Role	Notes
2023	Mortal Kombat 1	Raiden	Voice role
2025	Dune Awakening	The Guide	Voice role

== Soundtrack ==
Year	Title	Role	Notes
2015	"A Boy Band Made Up of Four Joshes"	Josh Chan	Crazy Ex-Girlfriend episode "I Hope Josh Comes to My Party!"
2015	"California Christmastime"	Josh Chan	Crazy Ex-Girlfriend episode "My Mom, Greg's Mom and Josh's Sweet Dance Moves!"
2016	"West Covina (Second Reprise)" (Duet with Rachel Bloom)	Josh Chan	Crazy Ex-Girlfriend episode "I'm Going to the Beach with Josh and His Friends!"
2016	"Angry Mad"	Josh Chan	Crazy Ex-Girlfriend episode "Why Is Josh in a Bad Mood?"
2016	"We Should Definitely Not Have Sex Right Now" (Duet with Rachel Bloom)	Josh Chan	Crazy Ex-Girlfriend episode "Where Is Josh's Friend?"
2016	"Ping Pong Girl"	Josh Chan	Crazy Ex-Girlfriend episode "When Will Josh See How Cool I Am?"
2016	"We Tapped That Ass" (Duet with Santino Fontana)	Josh Chan	Crazy Ex-Girlfriend episode "When Will Josh and His Friend Leave Me Alone?"
2016	"Thought Bubbles"	Josh Chan	Crazy Ex-Girlfriend episode "Why Is Josh's Ex-Girlfriend Eating Carbs?
2017	"Duh!"	Josh Chan	Crazy Ex-Girlfriend episode "Who Is Josh's Soup Fairy?"
2017	"We'll Never Have Problems Again" (Duet with Rachel Bloom)	Josh Chan	Crazy Ex-Girlfriend episode "Will Scarsdale Like Josh's Shayna Punim?"
2017	"I've Got My Head in the Clouds"	Josh Chan	Crazy Ex-Girlfriend episode "Josh's Ex-Girlfriend Wants Revenge."
2018	"Fit Hot Guys Have Problems Too" (with Scott Michael Foster and David Hull)	Josh Chan	Crazy Ex-Girlfriend episode "Nathaniel Gets the Message!"
2018	"No One Else Is Singing My Song" (with Rachel Bloom and Scott Michael Foster)	Josh Chan	Crazy Ex-Girlfriend episode "I Want to Be Here"
2019	"Sports Analogies" (Duet with Scott Michael Foster)	Josh Chan	Crazy Ex-Girlfriend episode "I Can Work With You"
2019	"The Math of Love Quadrangles" (with Rachel Bloom, Scott Michael Foster and Skyler Astin)	Josh Chan	Crazy Ex-Girlfriend episode "I Need to Find My Frenemy"
2021	"Better Life"	Ansel Beauregard	Voice role; from the Netflix animated musical film Arlo the Alligator Boy
2021	"Something's Missing" (Duet with Michael J. Woodard)	Ansel Beauregard	Voice role; from the Netflix animated musical film Arlo the Alligator Boy

== Stage credits ==
Year	Title	Role	Notes
2004	Irving Berlin's White Christmas (San Francisco Regional)	Ensemble	World premiere
2005	Irving Berlin's White Christmas (Boston)	Ensemble	Boston revival
2006	Pippin (East Haddam, CT Regional)	Ensemble	Goodspeed revival
2009	Xanadu (U.S. Tour)	Performer (Swing)	La Jolla Playhouse National Tour
2012	Anything Goes (U.S. Tour)	Luke	Roundabout Theatre Company National Tour
2014	Here Lies Love (Off-Broadway)	Performer (Swing); Marcos (Understudy); Aquino (Understudy); DJ (understudy)	Return production
2014	Disney's The Hunchback of Notre Dame (San Diego, CA Regional)	Congregation; Dance Captain; Magic Consultant	U.S. Premiere, La Jolla Playhouse production
2015	Disney's The Hunchback of Notre Dame (Millburn, NJ Regional)	Congregation; Dance Captain; Magic Consultant	Paper Mill Playhouse production
