= Steve Monroe =

American actor

- Born: October 30, 1972 (age 54); Tulsa, Oklahoma, U.S.
- Occupation: Actor
- Years active: 1988–present
- Spouse: Alana Monroe

Steve Monroe (born October 30, 1972) is an American actor, stand-up comedian, and practicing psychotherapist. He has a number of television credits to his name, including guest roles on such series as 7th Heaven, CSI: Crime Scene Investigation, Criminal Minds, Charmed, Monk, Grey's Anatomy, JAG, NYPD Blue, Veronica Mars, Zoey 101, iCarly, Supah Ninjas, Wizards of Waverly Place, and The Suite Life on Deck. He had a recurring role on Sister, Sister as Steve. His most recent role is as Scott Proctor on the CW series Crazy Ex-Girlfriend.

Monroe has appeared in a number of notable films including Austin Powers: International Man of Mystery, Cast Away, House of the Dead 2, Miss Congeniality, 100 Women and The Nutty Professor.

== Personal life ==
Monroe was born in Tulsa, Oklahoma and is a committed Catholic.

== Filmography ==
=== Film ===
Year	Title	Role	Notes
1997	Austin Powers: International Man of Mystery	Son	
1998	Can't Hardly Wait	Headbanger	
2000	Red Letters	Schminick	
2000	Cast Away	Steve Larson	
2000	Miss Congeniality	Frank Tobin	
2001	Going Greek	Nick	
2002	100 Women	Holden	AKA, Girl Fever
2003	Vampires Anonymous	Diesel McBain	
2005	House of the Dead 2	O'Connor	
2006	The Boys & Girls Guide to Getting Down	Bryce	
2014	Jersey Boys	Barry Belson	
2017	Suburbicon	Henry	
2017	School Spirits	Ned	
2019	The Harbinger	John	Post-production
2020	Promising Young Woman	Detective Lincoln Waller	
2024	It Ends With Us	Realtor	
TBA	Roe v. Wade	Carl Friedan	Filming

=== Television ===
Year	Title	Role	Notes
1994	Sweet Justice	Danny	Episode: "One Good Woman"
1994	Saved by the Bell: The New Class	Brick	Episode: "Bayside Story"
1995	Misery Loves Company	Billy	Episode: "Pilot"
1995–96	Night Stand	Eric Johnson	Episodes: "One-Night-Stand Reunions", "The Swallow Reunion"
1995–96	Sister, Sister	Steve	Recurring role (season 3)
1996	The Rockford Files: Punishment and Crime	Kravitz	TV film
1996	Pacific Blue	Reed	Episode: "Point Blank"
1997	Perversions of Science	Gorilla	Episode: "Panic"
1997	The Steve Harvey Show	DeAndre	Episode: "Don't Quit Your Day Job"
1997	The Visitor	Steven	Episode: "Caged"
1997	Mike Hammer, Private Eye	Ozzie	Episode: "Sins of the Fathers"
1997–98	7th Heaven	Mitch / Kevin	Episodes: "See You in September", "Rush to Judgment", "Drunk Like Me"
1997–2003	JAG	Sibley / PO Campbell / Lt. Jeremy Duncan	Episodes: "Force Recon", "Overdue & Presumed Lost", "Standards of Conduct"
1998	Home Improvement	Grant	Episode: "The Old College Try"
1998	Touched by an Angel	Denny	Episode: "Breaking Bread"
1998	Costello	Din-Din	Episodes: "Pilot", "Sue Drives, Ya Suck Bag", "Sue Dates a Freakin' Dentist"
1998	Felicity	Steve	Episode: "Finally"
1999	Inherit the Wind	Howard	TV film
1999	Misguided Angels	Clarence	Episodes: "In the Beginning", "You Say Goodbye and I Say Halo", "The Devil Came Down to Clarence"
2000	18 Wheels of Justice	Jimmy Crowder	Episode: "Key to the Highway"
2000	Charmed	The Pig	Episode: "Animal Pragmatism"
2001	Three Sisters	Mark	Episode: "Three Thanksgivings, One Turkey"
2002	The Santa Trap	Officer Calhoun	TV film
2003, 2009	Monk	Sgt. Myers / Chet Walsh	Episodes: "Mr. Monk Goes to the Circus", "Mr. Monk Makes the Playoffs"
2004	She Spies	Six-Pack	Episode: "Spies Gone Wild"
2004	Threat Matrix	Billy	Episode: "Extremist Makeover"
2004	The Division	Roger Clark	Episode: "As I Was Going to St. Ives..."
2004	NYPD Blue	Officer Shane	Episode: "Fish Out of Water"
2004	CSI: Crime Scene Investigation	Marty Kessler	Episode: "Down the Drain"
2005	Veronica Mars	Gabe	Episode: "Silence of the Lamb"
2005	Zoey 101	Joe	Episode: "Spring Fling"
2005	Las Vegas	Joe	Episode: "Everything Old Is You Again"
2006	Jane Doe: Yes, I Remember It Well	Al Jencks	TV film
2006	What I Did for Love	Jake Ryder	TV film
2006	American Men	The Mike	TV film
2007	Saving Grace	Cam	Episode: "Yeehaw, Geepaw"
2007	Nip/Tuck	Gabriel Marks	Episode: "Damien Sands"
2007	Black Widow	Matty Keegan	TV film
2008	iCarly	Braxley	Episode: "iPromote Techfoots"
2008	'Til Death	Sid	Episode: "Joy Ride"
2008	The Suite Life on Deck	Haggis	Episode: "International Dateline"
2009	Wizards of Waverly Place	Baxter Knight	Episode: "Don't Rain on Justin's Parade - Earth"
2009	Brothers	Kyle	Episode: "Meet Mike Trainor / Assistant Coach"
2010	The Wish List	Stu	TV film
2011	Chuck	Irv	Episode: "Chuck vs. the Business Trip"
2012	Supah Ninjas	Frostbite	Episode: "Frostbite"
2012	Shake It Up	Ralph	Episode: "Whodunit Up?"
2013	The Following	Jordy Raines	Episodes: "Pilot", "Chapter 2", "The Poet's Fire"
2013	Sullivan & Son	Chuck	Episode: "Hank Hallucinates"
2013	Rizzoli & Isles	Coach Mike	Episode: "Cold as Ice"
2013	A Country Christmas Story	Sam	TV film
2014	Criminal Minds	David Wade Cunningham	Episode: "Rabid"
2014	Hot in Cleveland	Sam	Episode: "Cold in Cleveland: The Christmas Episode"
2015	The McCarthys	Mr. Loeb	Episode: "End Games"
2015	Switched at Birth	Brian Stone	Episode: "Between Hope and Fear"
2015–2019	Crazy Ex-Girlfriend	Scott Proctor	Recurring role
2016	New Girl	Tom McQuaid	Episode: "No Girl"
2016	Kirby Buckets	Big Rick	Episode: "When Mitchell Met Dad"
2017	Major Crimes	Frank Boggs	Episode: "Conspiracy Theory: Part 1"
2017	Stuck in the Middle	Buddy Burtz	Episode: "Stuck at Christmas"
2024	Georgie & Mandy's First Marriage	Frank	Episode: "Secrets, Lies and a Chunk of Change"
