= Olivia Edward =

American actress

- Edward in 2026
- Born: January 25, 2007 (age 19)
- Occupation: Actress

Olivia Edward (born January 25, 2007) is an American actress. Best known for her role as Duke in the FX television series Better Things. She began her career at the age of two and has appeared in numerous guest spots on TV series such as Unbreakable Kimmy Schmidt and The Mysteries of Laura. The casting director for Better Things helped Edward to obtain a reoccurring role on the series Crazy Ex-Girlfriend on The CW.

Edward also dances and sings.

She has said that she is inspired by watching Pamela Adlon direct and act in Better Things.
