= Donna Lynne Champlin =

American actress

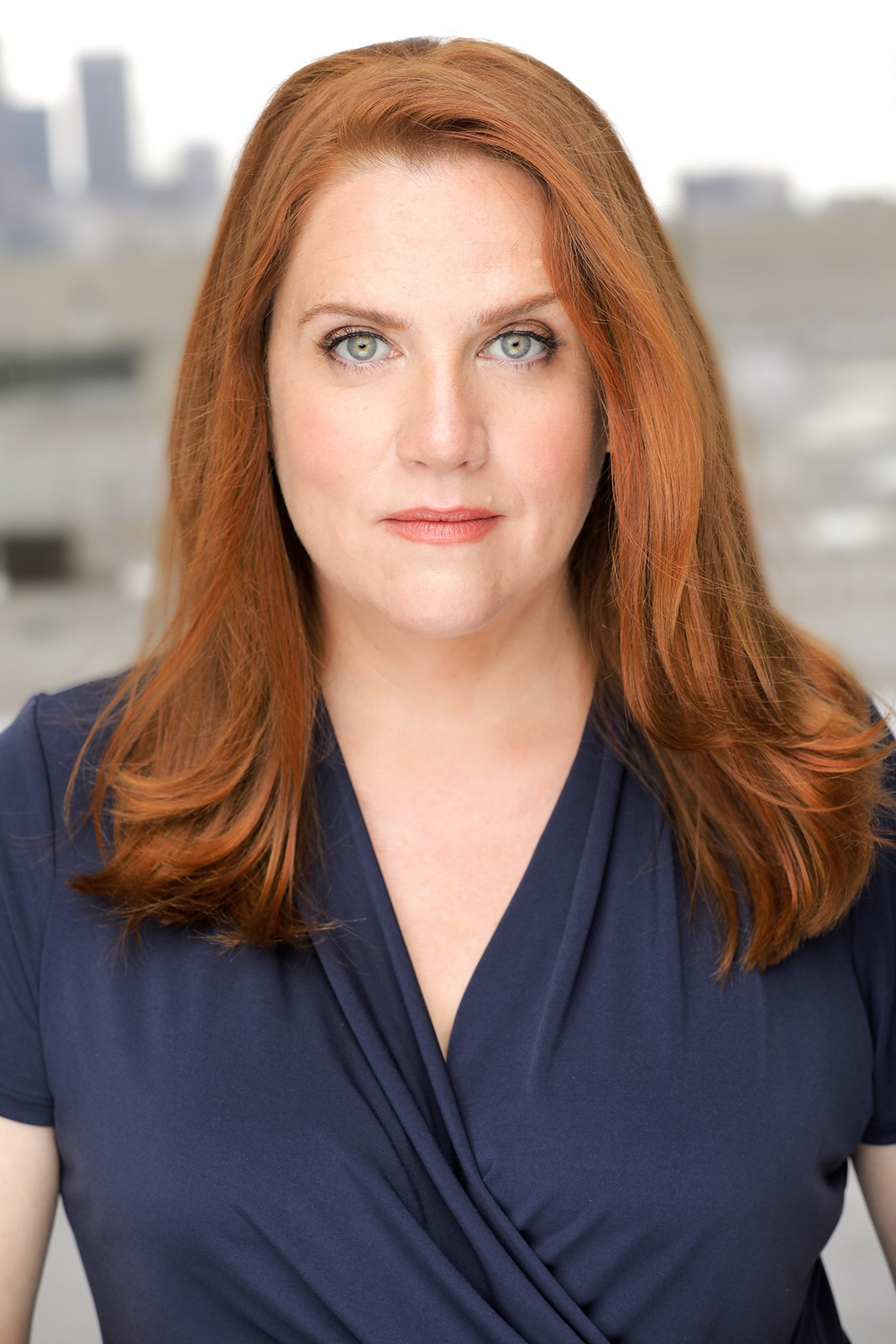
- Champlin in 2018
- Born: January 21, 1971 (age 55); Rochester, New York, U.S.
- Education: Carnegie Mellon University (BFA)
- Occupation: Actress
- Years active: 1993–present
- Spouse: Andrew Arrow (m. 2010)
- Children: 1

Donna Lynne Champlin (born January 21, 1971) is an American actress. She is best known for playing Paula Proctor on The CW comedy-drama series Crazy Ex-Girlfriend.

== Early life and education ==
Champlin was born in Rochester, New York, to a technical writer mother and a scientist father. She participated in various lessons, theatre productions, and national and international competitions throughout her childhood, in voice, piano, flute, theatre and dance.

Champlin went on to study musical theatre at Carnegie Mellon University, graduating with her BFA in 1993, and studied abroad as a 1992 Advanced Acting Scholar in Shakespeare and Chekhov at the University of Oxford. In 1992 she won the Princess Grace Foundation Award in Theatre. While still in college, she performed as Dorothy in The Wizard of Oz with Pittsburgh Civic Light Opera.

== Career ==
Champlin took on the title role of Very Warm for May, her Broadway debut in James Joyce's The Dead, then By Jeeves, Hollywood Arms, Sweeney Todd, Billy Elliot the Musical, and The Dark at the Top of the Stairs, for which she won the 2007 Obie Award. Other credits include: No, No Nanette, Very Good Eddie, First Lady Suite, Harold and Maude, My Life with Albertine, Bloomer Girl, and Jolson. She also performed with Len Cariou in the Simply Sondheim inaugural concert which celebrated the opening of the Sondheim Center for the Performing Arts.

Champlin's awards include the 2019 Gracie Award for Best Supporting Actress, 2013 Drama Desk Award, 2007 OBIE award, the Princess Grace Award, the title of National Tap Dance Champion four consecutive times, and she has received grants from the National Foundation for Advancement in the Arts, The Anna Sosenko Trust, Princess Grace Foundation, and has received The Charlie Willard Memorial Grant.

Champlin's film and television credits include The Dark Half, the 2000 and 2006 Annual Tony Awards, The View, Law & Order, The Good Wife, The Good Fight, The Good Doctor, and Live with Regis and Kelly. From 2015 to 2019, she starred in the role of Paula Proctor in The CW comedy-drama series Crazy Ex-Girlfriend., Hortense in Another Period and Barb in Netflix's Feel the Beat. In 2022, she appeared in the Showtime series The First Lady.

Champlin released a solo album entitled Old Friends, performs a one-woman show entitled Finishing the Hat, and teaches acting at the Carnegie Mellon University, the University of Hartford, and New York University.

== Personal life ==
Champlin married actor Andrew Arrow in 2010 and they have one child. They live in New York City. She spends her downtime writing, raising money for JDRF, BCEFA, The Actors Fund, and with her family.

== Filmography ==
=== Television ===
Year	Title	Role	Notes
2001	By Jeeves	Honoria Glossop	TV movie
2008–2010	Law & Order	Sergeant Angelyne Robinson / CSU Det. Halpern	2 episodes
2011–2014	Submissions Only	Kim Gifford	6 episodes
2014	The Good Wife	Myra Weymouth	Episode: "Oppo Research"
2015	Younger	Lori	Episode: "I'm with Stupid"
2015–2019	Crazy Ex-Girlfriend	Paula Proctor	Main character, 62 episodes
2018	Another Period	Hortense Bellacourt	Main character, 6 episodes
2020	The Good Fight	Mrs. Feldman	Episode: "The Gang Discovers Who Killed Jeffrey Epstein"
2021	Centaurworld	Prairiedogtaur (voice)	Episode: "Holes: Part 3"
2021	The Blacklist	Guinevere Claflin	Episode: "Elizabeth Keen (No. 1)"
2022	Baby Shark's Big Show!	Sammi Slickfish	Episode: "Swimming With the Sharks"
2022	The First Lady	Melissa Winter	6 episodes
2022	The Good Doctor	Brenna	Episode: "Dry Spell"
2024	The Perfect Couple	Nikki Henry	Miniseries
2024	Batman: Caped Crusader	Leslie Thompkins (voice)	Episode: "Nocturne"
2025	Law & Order: Special Victims Unit	Megan Wallace	Episode: "The Grid Plan"
2025	Elsbeth	Prison Warden "Mama" Martin	Episode: "Ramen Holiday"
2025	Super Duper Bunny League	Frau Whatsherface (voice)	Episode: "What's-Her-Face"

=== Film ===
Year	Title	Role	Notes
1993	The Dark Half	Babysitter	Uncredited
2008	The Audition	Monitor	Short film
2009	My Father's Will	Sandra	
2014	Birdman or (The Unexpected Virtue of Ignorance)	Broadway Lady	
2017	Downsizing	Leisureland Administrator	
2019	Yes, God, Yes	Mrs. Veda	
2020	Feel the Beat	Barb	

=== Podcasts ===
Year	Title	Voice role	Ref.
2020-21	In Strange Woods	Kathy	

== Theatre credits ==
Year	Title	Role	Notes
2000	James Joyce's The Dead	Mary Jane Morkan, Miss Molly Ivors (understudy)	Broadway
2000	James Joyce's The Dead	Mary Jane Morkan	Tour
2001	By Jeeves	Honoria Glossop	Broadway
2002	Hollywood Arms	Older Helen	Broadway
2003	My Life with Albertine	Grandmother	Off-Broadway, Playwrights Horizons
2005–2006	Sweeney Todd: The Demon Barber of Fleet Street	Adolpho Pirelli	Broadway
2008–2012	Billy Elliot the Musical	Dead Mum (understudy), Ensemble	Broadway
2010	See Rock City & Other Destinations	Claire/Kate	Off-Broadway, Transport Group
2021	Sweeney Todd: The Demon Barber of Fleet Street	Mrs. Lovett	Regional, Hangar Theatre
2026	The Loved Ones	Cheryl-Ann	Off-Broadway, Irish Repertory Theatre

== Awards and nominations ==
Year	Award	Category	Work	Result
1993	Princess Grace Award	Grant	Theatre	Won
2007	Obie Award	Performance	The Dark at the Top of the Stairs	Won
2008	NYMF Award for Excellence	Outstanding Performance	Love Jerry	Won
2013	Drama Desk Award	Outstanding Ensemble Performance	Working: A Musical	Won
2017	Gracie Awards	Outstanding Female Actor in a Supporting Role in a Comedy or Musical	Crazy Ex-Girlfriend	Won
