= Scott Michael Foster =

American actor

- Born: Winfield, Illinois, U.S.
- Occupation: Actor
- Years active: 2005–present
- Spouse: Carson Fagerbakke (m. 2026)

Scott Michael Foster is an American actor. He is best known for his roles as Captain John Paul "Cappie" Jones in the ABC Family comedy-drama series Greek (2007–11), Leo Hendrie in the ABC Family drama Chasing Life (2014–15) and as Nathaniel Plimpton III in Crazy Ex-Girlfriend (2017–19). Foster has also had recurring roles on Californication (2012), Halt and Catch Fire (2014), Once Upon a Time (2014), and You (2021).

== Early life and education ==
Foster was born in Winfield, Illinois, at Central DuPage Hospital. He has two sisters. He later moved to Highland Village, Texas, a suburb of Dallas, where he became interested in acting as early as elementary school. He went to Briarhill Middle School, and later attended Edward S. Marcus High School where he was involved in theater until he graduated in 2003. He attended Collin College for one semester with a focus on acting, but soon left his studies to pursue a professional career in that field. He plays guitar and is the lead singer of his indie rock band "Siren's Eye". They released their first EP on iTunes, entitled "Red Room" on 15 December 2009.

== Career ==
Foster appeared in the small indie film The Horrible Flowers, before landing the regular role in the ABC Family comedy-drama series, Greek. The series ran from 2007 to 2011. During his days on Greek, Foster also had the leading role in the independent film, Teenage Dirtbag. He later guest-starred on Law & Order: LA, Melissa & Joey, Friends with Benefits, The Closer, and Parenthood.

In 2012, Foster had recurring roles in the fifth season of Showtime comedy-drama series, Californication, and short-lived ABC paranormal horror series, The River. In 2013, he had the regular role in another short-lived ABC series, Zero Hour opposite Anthony Edwards and Carmen Ejogo. In 2014, Foster had recurring roles in AMC period drama, Halt and Catch Fire, and later in that year began appearing in the ABC Family drama series, Chasing Life as a love interest for the lead character. Also in 2014, he played the role of Kristoff in the fourth season of ABC fantasy series, Once Upon a Time.

In 2015, Foster began starring in the ABC prime time television soap opera, Blood & Oil alongside Don Johnson and Amber Valletta. In 2015, he was listed one of Variety’s "10 Actors to Watch".

In 2017, Foster began appearing as Nathaniel Plimpton III on the CW comedy-musical series Crazy Ex-Girlfriend.

In January 2021, it was announced that Foster had been cast in the recurring role of Ryan Goodwin on the third season of the Netflix thriller series You.

In 2023, he played the main character's boyfriend Paul in the Netflix interactive romcom film Choose Love.

== Personal life ==
From 2008 to 2013, Foster was in a relationship with actress Laura Prepon.

Since 2019, Foster has been in a relationship with actress Carson Fagerbakke, daughter of actor Bill Fagerbakke. They became engaged in December 2024. The couple married on August 1, 2026 at Berkeley Castle in England.

== Filmography ==
=== Film ===
Year	Title	Role	Notes
2005	The Horrible Flowers	Billy	
2009	Teenage Dirtbag	Thayer Mangeres	
2010	Ashley's Ashes	Kern	
2014	The Pact 2	Officer Meyer	
2015	Must Feed and Water	Alex	Short film
2016	My Dead Boyfriend	Howard	
2019	5 Years Apart	Andrew Russo	
2020	The Boy Behind the Door	Officer Steward	
2023	Choose Love	Paul Swartz	Netflix film

=== Television ===
Year	Title	Role	Notes
2007	The Game	Brandon	Episode: "Hit Me With Your Best Shot"
2007	Women's Murder Club	Milo Bishop	Episode: "Blind Dates and Bleeding Hearts"
2007–2011	Greek	Cappie	Main role, 74 episodes
2008	Quarterlife	Jed Berland	Recurring role, 3 episodes
2011	Parenthood	Gary	Episodes: "Taking the Leap" and "Slipping Away"
2011	Law & Order: LA	Roger	Episode: "Runyon Canyon"
2011	Melissa & Joey	George	Recurring role, 3 episodes
2011	Friends with Benefits	Daniel	Episode: "The Benefit of Friends"
2012	Californication	Tyler	Recurring role, 10 episodes
2012	The River	Jonas	Recurring role, 5 episodes
2012	The Closer	Luke	Episode: "Armed Response"
2013	Zero Hour	Arron Martin	Main role, 13 episodes
2014	Halt and Catch Fire	Hunt Whitmarsh	Recurring role, 7 episodes
2014–2015	Chasing Life	Leo Hendrie	Recurring role, 26 episodes
2014	Once Upon a Time	Kristoff	Recurring role, 9 episodes
2015	Blood & Oil	Wick Briggs	Main role
2017–2019	Crazy Ex-Girlfriend	Nathaniel Plimpton III	Recurring role (season 2); main role (seasons 3 and 4)
2019	In the Key of Love	Jake Colby	Hallmark Movie
2021	You	Ryan Goodwin	Recurring role, 5 episodes
2021	Love, for Real	Luke	TV movie
2021	Chicago P.D.	Transit Worker	Episode: "The Right Thing"
2023	Not Dead Yet	James	Episode: "Not Feeling It Yet"
2025	Return to Office	Tom Cole/Mr. Tuesday	Hallmark Channel Movie
