= We Bought a Zoo (disambiguation) =

We Bought a Zoo is a 2011 film directed by Cameron Crowe.

We Bought a Zoo may also refer to:

- We Bought a Zoo (book), a book by Benjamin Mee
- "WWE Bought a ZOO", a parody episode from the animated TV series Mad
