= Benjamin Mee =

Benjamin Mee may refer to:

- Ben Mee (born 1989), English footballer
- Benjamin Mee, owner of Dartmoor Zoological Park and author of We Bought a Zoo
