= An American Girl: Lea to the Rescue =

- Directed by: Nadia Tass
- Screenplay by: Karen Bloch Morse
- Based on: Lea by Lisa Yee
- Starring: Maggie Elizabeth Jones; Hallie Todd; Storm Reid; Laysla De Oliveira; Sean Cameron Michael; Rehane Abrahams; Connor Dowds
- Cinematography: David Parker
- Music by: Kenneth Burgomaster
- Production companies: Martin Chase Productions; Shaken Not Stirred; Out of Africa Entertainment
- Release date: June 14, 2016
- Running time: 98 minutes
- Country: United States
- Language: English

An American Girl: Lea to the Rescue is a 2016 family-drama film starring Maggie Elizabeth Jones in the title and final film role before she's retired, Hallie Todd, Laysla De Oliveira, Storm Reid, Sean Cameron Michael, Rehane Abrahams and Connor Dowds in supporting roles. The film was directed by Nadia Tass, who also previously directed the first two films in the American Girl franchise.

The film focuses on 2016 Girl of the Year Lea Clark, as she takes a trip to Brazil, and finds a way to save her brother who has disappeared mysteriously.

== Premise ==
Born for adventure, Lea Clark heads deep into the Brazilian rainforest, where her most exciting story awaits.

== Cast ==
- Maggie Elizabeth Jones as Lea Clark
- Hallie Todd as Carol Clark
- Storm Reid as Aki
- Laysla De Oliveira as Paula Ferreira
- Connor Dowds as Zac Clark
- Sean Cameron Michael as Ricardo Carvalho
- Rehane Abrahams as Officer Adriana Costa
- Kevin Otto as Rick Clark
- Joe Vaz as Miguel Belo
- Peter Butler as Bruno
- Mokgethoa Tebeila as Abby
- Aimee Valentine as Aki's Mother
- Lee Raviv as Zoe, the wide eyed girl
- Ray Crosswaite as Jimmy
- Farouk Valley-Omar as Tribal Elder

== Release ==
The direct-to-video film was released on video-on-demand services on May 31, 2016, and was released for DVD and Blu-ray on June 14.

== Notes ==
The film, despite being set in Brazil, was filmed in South Africa.
