= Sparkwell =

Village in Devon, England

Coordinates: 50°24′10″N 3°59′58″W

- Village
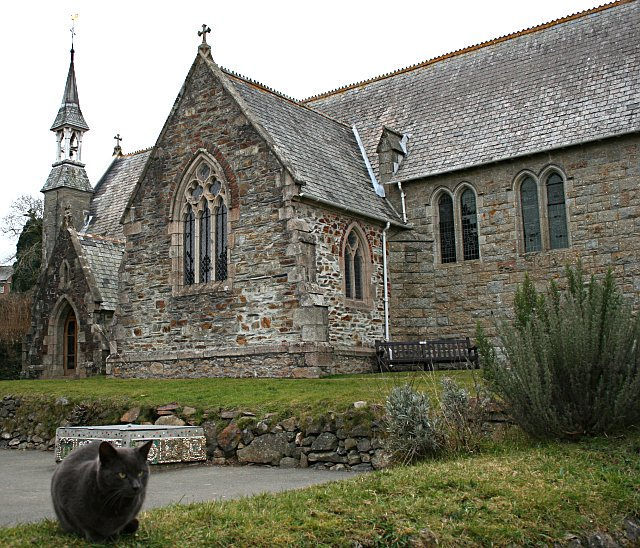
- All Saints church

- Location within Devon
- Population: 1,425 (2021 census)
- OS grid reference: SX5792557856
- Civil parish: Sparkwell
- District: South Hams
- Shire county: Devon
- Region: South West
- Country: England
- Sovereign state: United Kingdom
- Post town: PLYMOUTH
- Postcode district: PL7
- Dialling code: 01752
- Police: Devon and Cornwall
- Fire: Devon and Somerset
- Ambulance: South Western
- UK Parliament: South West Devon

Sparkwell is a small village and civil parish in the South Hams district of Devon. Historically it was part of Haytor Hundred. In 2021 the parish had a population of 1425.

Its local Anglican church is All Saints Church, Sparkwell. Its local non-conformist church is Lee Mill Congregational Church, which is affiliated to the EFCC.

Dartmoor Zoological Park is located on the outskirts of the village. The true story of Benjamin Mee's acquisition of the zoo inspired his book We Bought a Zoo, which was later adapted into a film starring Matt Damon.

The Hemerdon Mine is located in the parish.

On 28 December 1966 the parish was renamed from "Plympton St Mary" to "Sparkwell".
