= DZP =

DZP may refer to

- Dartmoor Zoological Park, an English zoo
- Dzeltenie Pastnieki, Latvian band
- Centre Party (Germany) (Deutsche Zentrumspartei)
- DZP, professional wrestling tag team consisting of Primo and Zack Ryder
