= Cameron Crowe =

American filmmaker and journalist (born 1957)

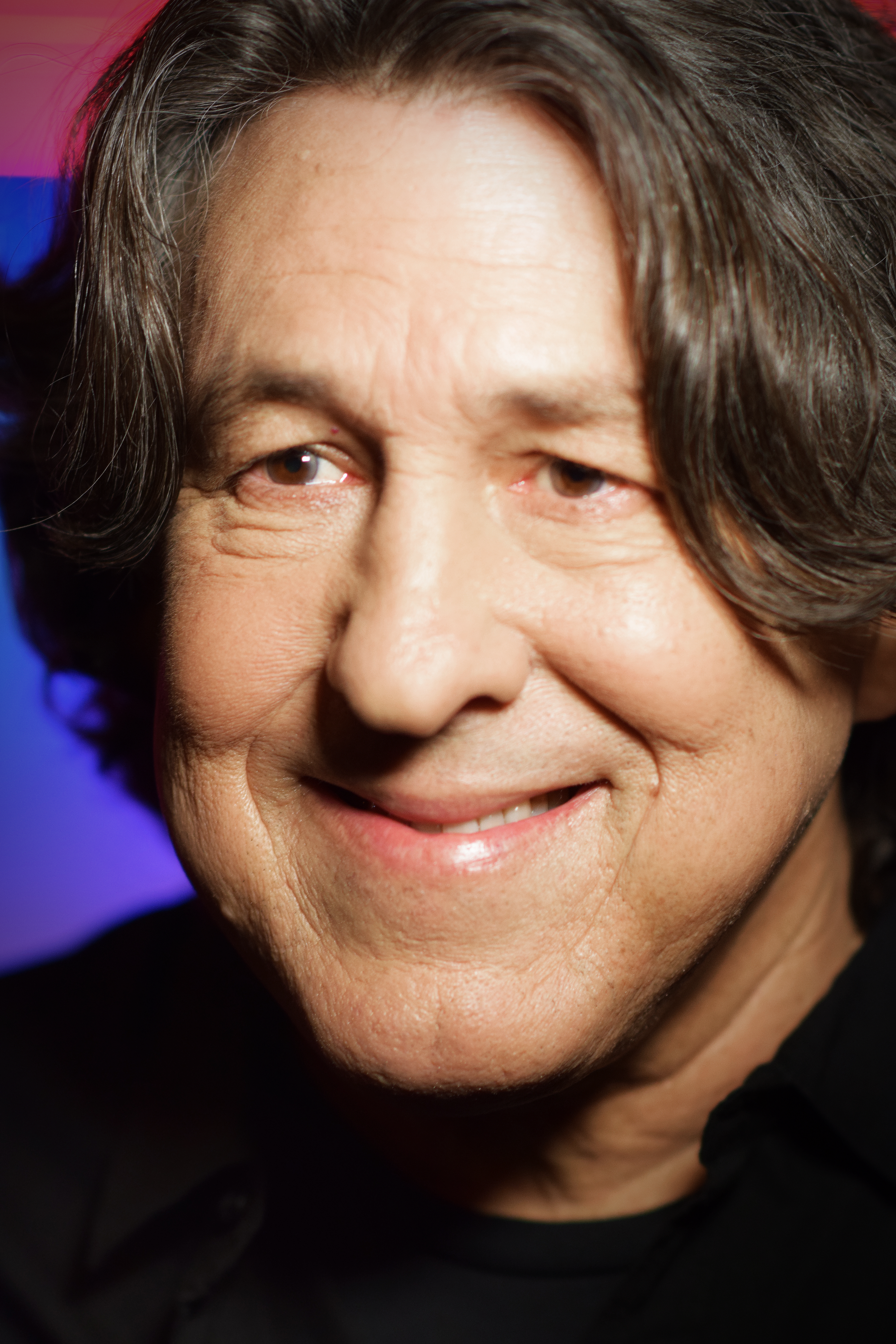
- Crowe in 2022
- Born: Cameron Bruce Crowe; July 13, 1957 (age 69); Palm Springs, California, U.S.
- Occupations: Filmmaker; journalist
- Years active: 1972–present
- Spouse: Nancy Wilson (m. 1986; div. 2010)
- Children: 3
- Website: theuncool.com

Cameron Bruce Crowe (born July 13, 1957) is an American filmmaker and journalist. He has received many accolades, including an Academy Award, BAFTA Award, Grammy Award, and a Tony Award nomination. Crowe started his career in 1973 as a contributing editor and writer at Rolling Stone magazine, where he covered many rock bands on tour.

Crowe's debut screenwriting effort, Fast Times at Ridgemont High (1982), grew out of a book he wrote while posing for one year undercover as a student at Clairemont High School in San Diego. Later, he wrote and directed the romance films Say Anything... (1989), Singles (1992), and Jerry Maguire (1996). Crowe's seminal work is the autobiographical film Almost Famous (2000), which is loosely based on his early career as a teen writer for Rolling Stone. For his screenplay, he won an Academy Award for Best Original Screenplay.

His later films include the psychological thriller Vanilla Sky (2001), the romantic comedy Elizabethtown (2005), the family-friendly We Bought a Zoo (2011), the romantic comedy Aloha (2015), and the music documentaries Pearl Jam Twenty (2011) and The Union (2011). He produced David Crosby: Remember My Name (2019), and created the Showtime series Roadies (2016).

Crowe has written three books, Fast Times at Ridgemont High (1981), Conversations with Wilder (1999), and The Uncool: A Memoir (2025). In 2022, he adapted Almost Famous into a stage musical on Broadway, for which he received a Tony Award for Best Original Score nomination.

== Early life ==
Crowe was born on July 13, 1957, in Palm Springs, California. His father, James A. Crowe, originally from Kentucky, was a real estate agent. His mother, Alice Marie (née George), "was a teacher, activist, and all-around live wire who did skits around the house and would wear a clown suit to school on special occasions." She worked as a psychology professor and in family therapy and often participated in peace demonstrations and causes relating to the rights of farm workers. Crowe's grandfather was Greek. Crowe was the youngest of three children, with two sisters; one died when he was young. The family moved often but spent a lot of time in Indio, California. Crowe has said that Indio was where "people owned tortoises, not dogs". His family finally settled in San Diego.

Crowe skipped kindergarten and two grades in elementary school, and by the time he attended Catholic high school, he was quite a bit younger than the other students. To add to his alienation, he was often ill because he had nephritis.

Crowe began writing for the school newspaper and by age 13 was contributing music reviews for an underground publication, The San Diego Door. He began corresponding with music journalist Lester Bangs, who had left the Door to become editor at the national rock magazine Creem, and soon he was also submitting articles to Creem as well as Circus. Crowe graduated from the University of San Diego High School in 1972 at age 15. On a trip to Los Angeles, he met Ben Fong-Torres, the editor of Rolling Stone, who hired him to write for the magazine. He also joined the Rolling Stone staff as a contributing editor and became an associate editor. During this time, Crowe interviewed Bob Dylan, David Bowie, Neil Young, Eric Clapton, the Eagles, Poco, Steely Dan, members of Led Zeppelin, and Stephen Bishop. He was Rolling Stone's youngest-ever contributor.

== Career ==
=== 1973–1976: Journalist with Rolling Stone ===
Crowe's first cover story was about the Allman Brothers Band. He went on the road with them for three weeks at age 16, during which time he interviewed the band and the road crew.

Because Crowe was a fan of the 1970s hard rock bands that the older writers disliked, he landed a lot of major interviews. He wrote about Yes, the Eagles, Led Zeppelin, the Allman Brothers Band, Jackson Browne, Neil Young, Rod Stewart, Eric Clapton, Peter Frampton, Linda Ronstadt, Crosby, Stills, Nash and Young, Fleetwood Mac and Joni Mitchell. Former colleague Sarah Lazin said of Crowe: "He was a pleasure to work with—a total professional. He was easygoing and eager to learn. Obviously, the bands loved him". Then-senior editor Ben Fong-Torres said of Crowe, "He was the guy we sent out after some difficult customers. He covered the bands that hated Rolling Stone."

=== 1977–1981: Film debut and breakthrough ===
==== Fast Times at Ridgemont High ====
When Rolling Stone moved its offices from California to New York in 1977, Crowe stayed behind. He felt the excitement of his career was waning. He appeared in the 1978 film American Hot Wax, but returned to his writing. Though he continued to freelance for Rolling Stone on and off over the years, he turned his attention to a book.

At 22, he came up with the idea to pose undercover as a high-school student and write about his experiences. Simon & Schuster gave him a contract, and he moved back in with his parents and enrolled as Dave Cameron at Clairemont High School in San Diego. Reliving the senior year he never had, he made friends and began to fit in. Though he initially planned to include himself in the book, he realized that it would jeopardize his ability to capture the essence of the high-school experience.

His book Fast Times at Ridgemont High: A True Story came out in 1981. Crowe focused on six main characters: a tough guy, a nerd, a surfer dude, a sexual sophisticate, and a middle-class brother and sister. He chronicled their activities in typical teenage settings—at school, at the beach, and at the mall, where many of them held after-school jobs—and concentrated on details of their lives that probed into the heart of adolescence. This included scenes about homecoming, graduation, social cliques, and sexual encounters.

Before the book was released, Fast Times at Ridgemont High was optioned for a film. Released in 1982, the movie lacked a specific plot or major stars. The studio devoted no marketing to it. It became a sleeper hit via word of mouth. Its reviews were favorable, and the film launched the careers of some previously unknown actors, including Jennifer Jason Leigh, Eric Stoltz, Judge Reinhold, Phoebe Cates, Anthony Edwards, Nicolas Cage, Forest Whitaker, and Sean Penn.

=== 1984–1992: Teen films ===
==== The Wild Life ====
Following the success of Fast Times at Ridgemont High, Crowe wrote the screenplay for 1984's The Wild Life, which critic Austin Trunick calls "a spiritual sequel" to Fast Times at Ridgemont High. Whereas its predecessor follows teenagers' lives in high school, The Wild Life traces the lives of several teenagers after high school living in an apartment complex. About the film and its poor reception, Crowe said, "It started out with good intentions but was marketed as a followup to Fast Times which it wasn’t. Director James L. Brooks was the only one who would talk to me after The Wild Life.”

==== Say Anything... ====
Filmmaker James L. Brooks (a former journalist himself) began following Crowe's career when he wrote for Rolling Stone, then after seeing Fast Times at Ridgemont High, he and Crowe began spending time together. Brooks and Crowe eventually came up with the premise for Say Anything..., with Crowe eventually writing the screenplay about a young man pining for the affections of a seemingly perfect girl. After six other directors turned down the opportunity to direct the film, Brooks decided to give Crowe the chance to direct for the first time. The film was released in 1989 and was favorably received by critics. Brooks and Crowe later reunited for the 1996 film Jerry Maguire.

==== Singles ====
Crowe's next project, 1992's Singles, described the romantic entanglements among a group of six friends in their twenties in Seattle. The film starred Bridget Fonda and Matt Dillon. Fonda played a coffee-bar waitress fawning over an aspiring musician played by Dillon. Kyra Sedgwick and Campbell Scott co-starred as a couple wavering on whether to commit to each other. Music is an integral backbone for the script, and the soundtrack became a commercial success three months before the release of the film. Much of this was due to repeated delays while studio executives debated how to market it. In a retrospective interview on the film in Rolling Stone, Crowe said, "I'd seen Spike Lee's Do The Right Thing; I liked the size of his movies and how they were rooted in his experience, his community … how he wanted Brooklyn to be showcased. And I'd always loved [Woody Allen's] Manhattan so much. So that was the beginning of Singles. It was a chance to show what it's like when you have a city that you love, and a group of friends who have become your family."

Singles sat on the shelf until the Seattle grunge music boom made the studio excited about the release. During production, bands like Nirvana were not yet national stars, but by the time the soundtrack was released, their song "Smells Like Teen Spirit" had to be cut from the film because the rights were too expensive. Crowe had signed members of Pearl Jam, shortly before their burgeoning, nationwide success, to portray Dillon's fictional band Citizen Dick. He also appeared as a rock journalist at a club. Tim Appelo wrote in Entertainment Weekly, "With... an ambling, naturalistic style, Crowe captures the eccentric appeal of a town where espresso carts sprout on every corner and kids in ratty flannel shirts can cut records that make them millionaires."

=== 1996–2000: Established career ===
==== Jerry Maguire ====
Branching into a new direction, Crowe wrote and directed Jerry Maguire. Released in 1996, the film centers on a highly paid sports agent, inspired by sports agent Leigh Steinberg. Maguire is fired after having a moral revelation, writing and distributing a mission statement calling for sincere service to the athletes and less money for the agency. He strikes out to form his own agency. Tom Cruise plays Jerry and Cuba Gooding, Jr. plays Rod Tidwell, an aging wide receiver. His catchphrase, "Show me the money!", became ubiquitous for a time. Renée Zellweger appears as an accountant who sets aside her job security to follow Jerry in both work and love. Gooding won a Best Supporting Actor Oscar for his role. The film was nominated for Best Picture, Best Screenplay, Best Editing, and Best Actor (for Cruise). Cruise won his second Golden Globe for his role as Jerry.

==== Almost Famous ====
In 2000, Crowe used his music journalism experience roots to write and direct Almost Famous, about the experiences of a teenage music journalist, based on Crowe himself, who goes on the road with an emerging band in the early 1970s. The film starred newcomer Patrick Fugit as William Miller, the baby-faced writer who finds himself immersed in the world of sex, drugs, and rock-and-roll. Kate Hudson co-starred as Penny Lane, a prominent groupie (or, as other characters call her, a "Band-Aid"). Digging into his most personal memories, Crowe used a composite of the bands he had known to come up with Stillwater, the emerging act that welcomes the young journalist into its sphere, then becomes wary of his intentions. Seventies rocker Peter Frampton served as a technical consultant on the film.

William Miller's mother figured prominently in the film as well (often admonishing, "Don't take drugs!"). The character was based on Crowe's mother, who even showed up at the film sets to keep an eye on him while he worked. Though he asked her not to bother Frances McDormand, who played her character, the two ended up getting along well. He also showed his sister, portrayed by Zooey Deschanel, rebelling and leaving home. In actuality, his mother and sister Cindy did not talk for a decade and were still somewhat estranged when he finished the film. The family reconciled when the project was complete.

Crowe took a copy of the film to London for a special screening with Led Zeppelin members Jimmy Page and Robert Plant. After the screening, Led Zeppelin granted Crowe the right to use one of their songs on the soundtrack and gave him rights to four other songs in the movie itself, although they did not grant him the rights to "Stairway to Heaven" for an intended scene (on the special "Bootleg" edition DVD, the scene is included as an extra without the song where the viewer is instructed by a watermark to begin playing it). Crowe and his then-wife, musician Nancy Wilson of Heart, co-wrote three of the five Stillwater songs in the film, and Frampton wrote the other two, with Mike McCready from Pearl Jam playing lead guitar on all the Stillwater songs. Reviews were almost universally positive, and it was nominated for and won a host of film awards, including an Academy Award for Best Original Screenplay for Crowe. Crowe and co-producer Danny Bramson also won the Best Compilation Soundtrack Album for a Motion Picture, Television or Other Visual Media Grammy Award for the soundtrack. Despite these accolades, box office returns for the film were disappointing.

=== 2001–2015: Films and music documentaries ===
==== Vanilla Sky ====
Crowe followed Almost Famous with the psychological thriller Vanilla Sky in 2001. The film, starring Tom Cruise, Penélope Cruz, and Cameron Diaz, received mixed reviews, but grossed $100.6 million at the US box office, making it his second highest grossing directorial effort behind Jerry Maguire (1996). Vanilla Sky is a remake of Alejandro Amenabar's 1997 Spanish film Abre Los Ojos (Open Your Eyes). Sofia is played by Cruz in both Amenabar's movie and Crowe's remake.

==== Elizabethtown ====
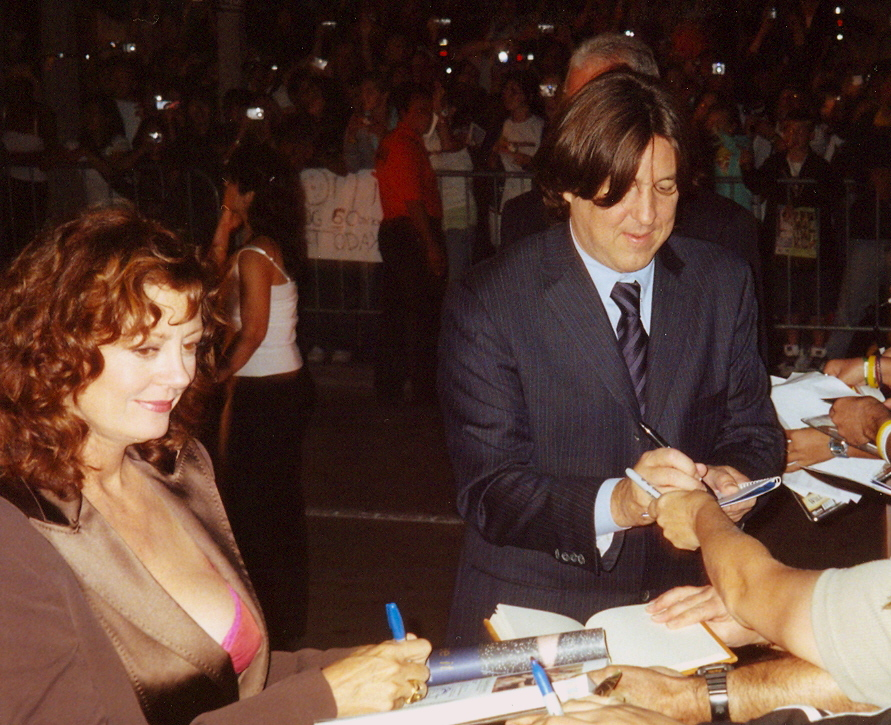
Susan Sarandon and Crowe at the premiere of Elizabethtown, Toronto Film Festival 2005

In 2005, Crowe directed the romantic tragicomedy Elizabethtown, starring Orlando Bloom and Kirsten Dunst, which opened to mixed reviews, scoring 45 on Metacritic, the same as Vanilla Sky.

==== Music documentaries ====
In November 2009, Crowe began filming a behind-the-scenes look at the creation of the album The Union, a collaboration between musicians Elton John and Leon Russell produced by T-Bone Burnett. The documentary features musicians Neil Young, Brian Wilson, Booker T. Jones, steel guitarist Robert Randolph, Don Was and a 10-piece gospel choir who all appear on the album with John and Russell. Musician Stevie Nicks and John's longtime lyricist Bernie Taupin also appear. On March 2, 2011, the documentary was announced to open the 2011 Tribeca Film Festival.

In an interview with Pearl Jam on March 9, 2009, bassist Jeff Ament said that their manager Kelly "has had the idea to do a 20-year anniversary retrospective movie so he's been on board with [film director] Cameron Crowe for the last few years." The band's guitarist Mike McCready said in March, "We are just in the very early stages of that, . . . starting to go through all the footage we have, and Cameron's writing the treatment." Preliminary footage was shot in June 2010. A trailer for the movie Pearl Jam Twenty, which featured Pearl Jam frontman Eddie Vedder choosing between three permanent markers in a shop before turning to the camera and saying "Three's good... Twenty is better", was shown before select movies at the 2011 BFI London Film Festival. The film premiered at the 2011 Toronto International Film Festival and had an accompanying book and soundtrack.

==== We Bought a Zoo ====
With production on the film Aloha delayed, Crowe set his next feature, the family comedy-drama We Bought a Zoo, based on Benjamin Mee's memoir of the same name. He collaborated with The Devil Wears Prada writer Aline Brosh McKenna on the screenplay. The book's story follows Mee, who buys and moves into a dilapidated zoo (now Dartmoor Zoological Park) in the English countryside. Looking for a fresh start along with his seven-year-old daughter and his troubled 14-year-old son, he hopes to refurbish the zoo, run it, and give his children what he calls an "adventure". Crowe changed the location to the United States. The film received a wide release on December 23, 2011, by 20th Century Fox, and starred Matt Damon and Scarlett Johansson. It received mixed reviews. The music is by Jonsi.

==== Aloha ====
It was announced in early June 2008 that Crowe would return to write and direct his seventh feature film, initially titled Deep Tiki and Volcano Romance, set to star Ben Stiller and Reese Witherspoon, and to be released by Columbia Pictures. Filming was expected to begin in January 2009, but this was postponed.

The project resurfaced in 2013. Bradley Cooper, Emma Stone, Rachel McAdams, Alec Baldwin, Bill Murray, John Krasinski, and Danny McBride joined the cast; filming began in Hawaii in September 2013. The film's final title was Aloha and it was released on May 29, 2015, by Sony Pictures to poor reviews.

=== 2016–present: Career expansion ===
==== Television debut ====
On June 26, 2016, Crowe's comedy-drama series Roadies premiered on the Showtime television channel. The show, starring Luke Wilson, Carla Gugino, and Imogen Poots, tells the story of a colorful road crew who work behind the scenes for a fictional rock band, The Staton-House Band. The pilot episode was written and directed by Crowe, as was the series finale.

==== Broadway debut ====
In 2019, Crowe started writing the stage musical Almost Famous, based on his 2000 film, with music by Tom Kitt. The show debuted in San Diego at The Old Globe in 2019 and had plans for a Broadway run but was stalled by the COVID-19 shutdown. The production ran at the Bernard B. Jacobs Theatre on Broadway from October 2022 to January 2023 with 77 performances. The musical received mixed reviews from critics. Crowe received a Best Original Score nomination at the 76th Tony Awards.

==== Joni Mitchell biopic ====
In 2023, it was announced that Crowe and singer-songwriter Joni Mitchell had been secretly working on a film of her life story to be directed by Crowe. On August 18, 2025, it was reported that Anya Taylor-Joy and Meryl Streep would portray younger and older versions of Mitchell.

==== The Uncool ====
On 28 October 2025, Crowe published a memoir titled The Uncool with Avid Reader Press. The book focuses on Crowe's teenage adventures as a Rolling Stone writer/editor. The title of the book comes from a contemporaneous rock critic, Lester Bangs, whom Crowe greatly admired. Crowe says Bangs cautioned him one day, saying, “We’re from (expletive) San Diego. We’re uncool!”

=== Unrealized projects ===
After Singles was released, Warner Bros. Television tried to turn the film into a television series, but Crowe turned it down.

In 1997, it was reported that Crowe was in talks to direct a biopic about Phil Spector, with Tom Cruise in discussions to portray him. The film was to have been distributed by Universal Pictures. Crowe said in 2005 that the film was unlikely to be made due to Spector's murder of Lana Clarkson. It has also been said that the film was never made due to the failure of finding a third act to the story.

Crowe also attempted to make a biopic about Marvin Gaye titled My Name Is Marvin. That project fell apart in 2010 due to casting and budget issues.

== Personal life ==
Crowe married Nancy Wilson of the rock band Heart in July 1986. Their twin sons were born in January 2000. Crowe and Wilson separated in 2008 and Wilson filed for divorce on September 23, 2010, citing "irreconcilable differences". The divorce was finalized on December 8, 2010.

In November 2024, Crowe's girlfriend, Anais Smith, gave birth to a girl.

== Filmography ==
=== Film ===
Year	Film	Director	Writer	Producer	Notes
1982	Fast Times at Ridgemont High	No	Yes	No	
1984	The Wild Life	No	Yes	Yes	
1989	Say Anything...	Yes	Yes	No	
1992	Singles	Yes	Yes	Yes	
1996	Jerry Maguire	Yes	Yes	Yes	
2000	Almost Famous	Yes	Yes	Yes	
2001	Vanilla Sky	Yes	Yes	Yes	
2005	Elizabethtown	Yes	Yes	Yes	
2011	The Union	Yes	Yes	Yes	Documentary films
2011	Pearl Jam Twenty	Yes	Yes	Yes	Documentary films
2011	We Bought a Zoo	Yes	Yes	Yes	
2015	Aloha	Yes	Yes	Yes	
2019	David Crosby: Remember My Name	No	No	Yes	Documentary film

Acting credits

Year	Film	Role	Note
1978	American Hot Wax	Delivery Boy	
1984	The Wild Life	Cop #2	
1992	Singles	Club Interviewer	
2002	Minority Report	Bus Passenger	Uncredited
2018	The Other Side of the Wind	Party Guest	Filmed in 1972

=== Music videos ===
Year	Band	Song	Album
1983	Tom Petty and the Heartbreakers	"Change of Heart"	Long After Dark
1992	Paul Westerberg	"Dyslexic Heart"	Singles: Original Motion Picture Soundtrack
1992	Alice in Chains	"Would?"	Dirt / Singles: Original Motion Picture Soundtrack
2009	Pearl Jam	"The Fixer" (live)	Backspacer
2020	Stevie Nicks	"Show Them the Way"	Non-album single

=== Television ===
Year	Title	Notes
1983	Tom Petty: Heartbreakers Beach Party	MTV special; reissued theatrically in 2024
2016	Roadies	Showtime series; creator, writer, director, and executive producer

=== Theatre ===
Year	Title	Notes
2019	Almost Famous	Book and lyrics writer; Broadway debut

== Recurring collaborators ==
Work Actor	1989	1992	1996	2000	2001	2005	2011	2015	—N/a
Work Actor	Say Anything...	Singles	Jerry Maguire	Almost Famous	Vanilla Sky	Elizabethtown	We Bought a Zoo	Aloha	Total
Jeremy Piven									2
Eric Stoltz									3
Tom Cruise									2
John Fedevich									2
Mark Kozelek									2
Jason Lee									2
Ivana Miličević									3
Noah Taylor									2
Patrick Fugit									2
Alec Baldwin									2

== Awards and nominations ==
Year	Film	Academy Awards		BAFTA Awards		Golden Globe Awards	
Year	Film	Nominations	Wins	Nominations	Wins	Nominations	Wins
1996	Jerry Maguire	5	1			3	1
2000	Almost Famous	4	1	6	2	4	2
2001	Vanilla Sky	1				1	
Total		10	2	6	2	8	3

Directed Academy Award performances
Under Crowe's direction, these actors have received Academy Award wins and nominations for their performances in their respective roles.

Year	Performer	Film	Result
Academy Award for Best Actor
1996	Tom Cruise	Jerry Maguire	Nominated
Academy Award for Best Supporting Actor
1996	Cuba Gooding Jr.	Jerry Maguire	Won
Academy Award for Best Supporting Actress
2000	Kate Hudson	Almost Famous	Nominated
2000	Frances McDormand	Almost Famous	Nominated

== Bibliography ==
- Crowe, Cameron (1981). Fast Times at Ridgemont High: A True Story. Simon and Schuster. ISBN 978-0-671-25290-8.
- Wilder, Billy; Crowe, Cameron (1999). Conversations with Wilder. Knopf. ISBN 978-0-375-40660-7.
- Crowe, Cameron (2025). The Uncool: A Memoir. Simon and Schuster. ISBN 978-1-668-05943-2.
