= Glenn Withrow =

American actor

- Born: Highland Heights, Kentucky, U.S.
- Occupations: Actor, writer, producer, director
- Years active: 1977–present
- Spouse: Hallie Todd (m. 1991)
- Children: Ivy Withrow

Glenn Withrow is an American actor, writer, producer, and director.

== Early life ==
Withrow was born in Highland Heights, Kentucky. He has two brothers. Withrow attended Campbell County High School.

== Career ==
Withrow began acting after moving to Los Angeles and had roles in films such as The Outsiders as Tim Shepard, Rumble Fish and Peggy Sue Got Married. He has had roles in five productions directed by Francis Ford Coppola.

Withrow is CEO of In House Media, Inc. The company produces content through their subsidiary partnership with In House Media Film Partners and Redburn Street Pictures, including “The Mooring” (Lionsgate) and its award-winning film, “The Last Champion”, released through (Amazon and Paramount Network) starring Cole Hauser of Yellowstone. The company has multiple films in various stages of development and a six episode limited series in pre-production.

== Personal life ==
Withrow has been married to actress Hallie Todd since 1991. The couple have a daughter.

== Filmography ==
| Year | Title | Role | Notes |
|---|---|---|---|
| 1979 | Studs Lonigan | Young "Red" Kelly | |
| 1979 | The Lady in Red | Eddie | |
| 1979 | The Waltons | Tommy Satterfield | One episode entitled The Home Front: Part 1 |
| 1980 | The Hollywood Knights | "Shorty" | |
| 1980 | Riding For The Pony Express | Billy Bloss | Pilot episode |
| 1981 | Knots Landing | Danny | One episode entitled Moments of Truth |
| 1981 | Bret Maverick | Billy "The Kid" | Episode entitled Anything for a Friend |
| 1983 | The Outsiders | Tim Shepard | |
| 1983 | Sweet Sixteen | Johnny Franklin | |
| 1983 | Rumble Fish | Biff Wilcox | |
| 1984 | The Cotton Club | Ed Popke | |
| 1986 | Hardcastle and McCormick | Joey Britton | One episode entitled Poker Night |
| 1986 | Armed and Dangerous | Lawrence Lupik | |
| 1986 | The Patriot | "Pink" | |
| 1986 | Peggy Sue Got Married | Terry | |
| 1986 | Sylvan In Paradise | "Sparky" | Pilot episode |
| 1987 | Faerie Tale Theatre | Harpoon Crew Member | Appeared in episode Rip Van Winkle |
| 1987 | Beverly Hills Cop II | Willie | |
| 1987 | Dudes | Wes | |
| 1987 | Nightflyers | Keelor | |
| 1987 | ALF | Richard | Episodes ALF's Special Christmas Part 1 and Part 2 |
| 1988 | Pass the Ammo | Arnold Limpet | |
| 1988 | Dirty Dozen: The Series | Roy Beauboff | |
| 1988 | It Takes Two | Frank | |
| 1989 | Naked Lie | Andy Fencik | |
| 1990 | By Dawn's Early Light | Lieutenant Tyler | |
| 2012 | The Mooring | | Director, writer, and co-producer |
| 2020 | The Last Champion | | Director, co-writer, and producer |
