= The Last Champion =

- Directed by: Glenn Withrow
- Written by: Glenn Withrow; Ivy Withrow; Hallie Todd
- Produced by: Glenn Withrow; Ivy Withrow; Hallie Todd; Brian Gork; Mike Jarzabek
- Starring: Cole Hauser
- Production company: Redburn Street Pictures
- Release date: December 8, 2020
- Running time: 122 minutes
- Country: United States
- Language: English

The Last Champion is a 2020 American sports drama film directed by Glenn Withrow and starring Cole Hauser.

== Plot ==
The Last Champion follows John Wright, played by Cole Hauser, a former Olympic wrestler whose promising life unraveled after years of addiction, scandal, and personal failure. Once celebrated as a hometown hero and one of the greatest athletes to ever come from the area, John returns home carrying the weight of his ruined reputation and the regret of wasted opportunities. The town that once admired him now views him as a cautionary tale, and many people believe he abandoned not only his career, but also the people who once believed in him. Struggling to find direction after the death of his mother, John reluctantly reconnects with the local high school wrestling program, where the longtime head coach sees something in him that others no longer can.

Although John initially only helps around practices, the sudden death of the head coach leaves the team devastated and without leadership in the middle of the season. Despite criticism from parents, school officials, and members of the community who question his past, John steps into the role of head coach. Taking over a team already filled with pressure and conflict, John quickly realizes that many of the wrestlers are battling problems far beyond the mat. The team’s most talented athletes, Michael Miller and Scott Baker, become the center of the season’s growing tension. Scott is an arrogant but gifted wrestler whose aggressive personality and temper often create problems within the locker room. Michael, on the other hand, is a hardworking and disciplined wrestler struggling to hold together a broken life outside of school.

Michael’s home life becomes one of the emotional centers of the film. Living in poverty with several younger siblings, Michael is forced into the role of caretaker because of his neglectful mother, who spends little time providing support or stability for her children. While trying to balance school, wrestling, and family responsibilities, Michael constantly feels overwhelmed and isolated. As the season progresses, his situation only worsens as his mother becomes increasingly absent before eventually abandoning the family altogether. Left alone to care for his siblings with nowhere to turn, Michael begins to lose hope that life will ever improve. However, after learning about their situation, the widow of the former wrestling coach decides to take Michael and the children into her home. Wanting to honor her husband’s lifelong dedication to helping young wrestlers, she provides them with the stable family environment they had been missing for years. Her kindness becomes a turning point in Michael’s life and gives him the emotional support he needs to continue pursuing wrestling and school.

At the same time, John finds himself trapped in a moral conflict involving Scott’s father, a wealthy and influential businessman in the town. Desperate to save his late mother’s house from financial ruin, John agrees to a secret arrangement: in exchange for removing the debt hanging over the property, John will guarantee Scott the varsity wrestling spot over Michael. The deal ultimately leads to a controversial call during a wrestle-off between the two athletes. Michael clearly avoids being pinned, but John intentionally calls the pin in Scott’s favor anyway. The decision shocks Michael and leaves him feeling completely betrayed by John. The bad call creates division within the team and leaves John consumed by guilt as he begins realizing how far he has drifted from the values wrestling once taught him.

As the season continues, tensions between Michael and Scott grow increasingly personal. Their rivalry intensifies both on and off the mat, especially after Scott becomes enraged over Michael spending time with his girlfriend. Eventually, the situation explodes when Scott violently attacks Michael in front of the team. Witnessing Scott’s behavior firsthand forces John to finally confront his own mistakes. Refusing to continue sacrificing his integrity, John removes Scott from the team and ends the agreement with Scott’s father despite the financial consequences. Furious and humiliated, Scott transfers to a rival school midway through the season, setting the stage for a final showdown later in the year.

With Scott gone, John fully commits himself to helping Michael succeed both as a wrestler and as a person. Through intense training, difficult conversations, and shared personal struggles, the two slowly form a genuine bond built on trust and respect. John begins seeing Michael as an opportunity to help someone avoid the same mistakes that destroyed his own life, while Michael starts viewing John as the father figure and mentor he never had. Wrestling becomes more than just competition for either of them; it becomes a way to confront failure, rebuild confidence, and discover purpose again.

Everything builds toward the state championship tournament, where Michael and Scott eventually meet one final time representing rival schools. The championship match becomes the emotional climax of the film and symbolizes everything both wrestlers have experienced throughout the season. Scott dominates much of the match with his aggression and athletic ability, taking a 15–12 lead late in the 3rd overtime period and appearing only moments away from winning the state title. However, Michael refuses to quit despite exhaustion and injury. With only seconds remaining on the clock, Michael throws him onto his back and secures a dramatic pinfall victory with just two seconds left in the match.

In the final moments of the film, the crowd erupts as Michael is celebrated as state champion, but the emotional focus remains on the relationship between him and John. After the match, Michael thanks John for everything he did throughout the season and tells him that he helped change not only his wrestling career, but also his life. As the arena celebrates around him, John quietly walks out alone, finally able to let go of the guilt and regret that had haunted him for years. For the first time since returning home, he is at peace with himself and able to move forward with a new sense of purpose, redemption, and happiness.

== Cast ==
- Cole Hauser as John Wright
- Sean H. Scully as Michael Miller
- Hallie Todd as Melinda Miller
- Randall Batinkoff as Bobby Baker
- Peter Onorati as Frank Stevens
- Annika Marks as Elizabeth Barnes
- Bob McCracken as Pastor Barnes
- Taylor Dearden as Joanna Miller
- Casey Moss as Scott Baker

== Production ==
Hauser's casting was announced in December 2016.

The film was shot in Idaho and Washington. Filming occurred in Garfield, Washington. Filming also occurred in the Allen Event Center in Allen, Texas.

== Release ==
The film was released on digital platforms on December 8, 2020.

== Reception ==
Michael Foust of Crosswalk.com gave the film both the entertainment rating and family friendly rating a 4 out of 5.
