= The Mooring (2012 film) =

- Directed by: Glenn Withrow
- Screenplay by: Hallie Todd; Glenn Withrow; Ivy Withrow
- Produced by: Glenn Withrow; Hallie Todd; Ivy Withrow; Penelope L. Foster; James Edington; Jeff Scott Edwards
- Starring: Hallie Todd; Thomas Wilson Brown; Karli Blalock; Anna Goodwin; Larissa Hayden; Lilli Hendrickson; Erin McIntosh; Olivia Meyer; Hailee Naccarato; Jessica Pepeli; Katie Simpson; Brooklyn Tate
- Edited by: Rob Jaeger
- Music by: Mike Jarzabek
- Production company: In House Media Film Partners
- Distributed by: Grindstone Entertainment/Lionsgate Home Entertainment
- Release dates: July 8, 2012 (Neuchâtel); February 19, 2013 (United States/Canada)
- Running time: 90 minutes
- Country: United States
- Language: English

The Mooring is a 2012 American thriller film directed by Glenn Withrow, starring Hallie Todd, Thomas Wilson Brown, and ten young actors from across the United States. The film is scored and composed by Mike Jarzabek and features music from the band NO. It follows a group of girls in a technology addiction camp who run into a dangerous couple in the woods. The film had its premiere at Switzerland's Neuchatel International Fantastic Film Festival, and was released on DVD and Digital Download by Lionsgate in February 2013.

== Plot ==
The film opens with a teenage girl who is abducted from her family by a man in the woods, and locked away in his boat. Ten years later, counselor Nancy (Hallie Todd) speaks with eight young girls who have been brought to her due to their addiction to cell phones and technology: text message addict Margot, online gambler Remi, hacker Natalie, cyber bully Justine, online addicts Madison and Holly, online dater Claire, and Ashley, a girl who caused a six-car accident due to talking on her cell phone. The purpose of the retreat is for the girls to learn to interact with each other without the use of technology.

Along with Nancy's aide, Dawn, the girls board a houseboat where they learn how to communicate with each other. During a writing exercise, Ashley breaks down while writing to the mother of a boy she injured in the six-car pile up she caused. Later, while the girls play board games, Nancy notices something wrong with the boat's engine. She decides to moor the boat to land and stay overnight. The girls set up camp. Later that night, the girls bond at the campfire, and Nancy allows the girls to listen to music. Soon after, they hear the engine of another boat, and a man and a woman's voices. Nancy advises the girls to get some sleep. Natalie, in a deep voice, tells the couple to keep it down. Over a loud speaker, the man's voice yells, "Shut up, bitch," and points the boat's light at the group for a brief moment. The girls quickly go to bed.

The next day, the girls are approached by the woman from the night before, Mickey. She asks them for coffee, while her boyfriend, Richard, watches from afar through his rifle scope. He keeps his focus on Margot, but quickly calls Mickey back to the boat so they can set off. Nancy, weary of the boat's engine, decides to drive it back to shore without the girls to get it checked, leaving Dawn in charge. Dawn shows the girls the basics of rappelling while Nancy drives the boat back. Suddenly, the boat dies out, leaving Nancy stranded. Richard's boat appears, and Mickey offers to tow Nancy back.

Meanwhile, Dawn is teaching Margot, Natalie, and Justine to quickly prepare themselves for rappelling. The girls soon see the couple's boat approaching them. Dawn notices through her binoculars that they have Nancy, whose arms, legs, and mouth are taped together, and an anchor tied to her ankles. Richard pushes her into the water, while Mickey drops the anchor. The boat circles around Holly, Claire, and Madison, who had been swimming. The girls race to shore and begin running through the forest, Richard and Mickey following close behind. Eventually, Holly and Ashley get separated from the group. After Ashley trips and hits her head on a rock, Richard shoots and kills her. Holly drops her inhaler, but keeps running. Soon, she runs out of breath, and hides by a log. Richard finds her and gives her the inhaler, allowing her to run off after she has caught her breath. Elsewhere, the girls find Nancy's boat. Dawn advises them to wait until nightfall to make their way to the boat.

At night, Holly finds her way back to the girls, who were using paddles to manually control the boat. The girls rest in the boat for a few moments, then hear the couples' boat's engine. While scurrying to get the poles out, Richard hooks Claire's back and drags her into the river, killing her. The girls panic as numerous gunshots bombard the boat's windows while the couple plays country music in the background. The girls quickly flee back to land, but the couple follows them. While they hide behind trees, Madison is caught by a bear trap. Everyone but Dawn who has become too traumatized to move rush to her aid, allowing Richard to find and kill Dawn with his rifle. The couple departs back to their boat, where Richard attempts to have sex with Mickey. He chokes her when she refuses, then releases her before she blacks out. Later, Margot tells Justine they should leave Madison and come back for her, but Justine refuses.

At sunrise, the girls watch Mickey driving in a smaller boat. Holly, Remi, Justine, Margot, and Natalie carry Madison, suffering from shock, over their shoulders. Nearby, Richard stalks them and shoots at them with his pistol. The girls soon come to a cliff and realize they must rappel down. Natalie, Margot, and Holly make it down, but Remi decides she must carry Madison down with her. Justine supervises the pair as they descend, but Richard orders Mickey to stop them while he tries to make it to the three at the bottom. Mickey uses a machete to cut the line, and Remi and Madison fall to their deaths. While Richard chases down Holly, Margot, and Natalie, Mickey kills Justine with the machete in a panic. The girls find Richard's boat, but Holly rushes for Mickey's smaller boat and gets caught by Richard, who drowns her by holding her under the water. Margot and Natalie scramble to find the keys to the boat, but Natalie is shot and killed. Richard tries to console Margot, but she sobs until he throws her into a cabinet. Mickey returns, and after an insult, motions her machete at Richard's throat. She hears Margot's cries, and Richard comments, "Takes you back, huh?", causing Mickey to remember how she was abducted ten years earlier by Richard (as evidenced by the opening scene). Mickey swiftly slits his throat with the machete. She drives off in her boat, leaving Margot alive on their boat.

== Cast ==
- Hallie Todd as Nancy
- Thomas Wilson Brown as Richard
- Karli Blalock as Ashley
- Anna Goodwin as Margot
- Larissa Hayden as Remi
- Lilli Hendrickson as Justine
- Erin McIntosh as Claire
- Olivia Meyer as Madison
- Hailee Naccarato as Holly
- Jessica Pepeli as Natalie
- Katie Simpson as Dawn
- Brooklyn Tate as Mickey

== Production ==
The movie was written by Glenn Withrow, Hallie Todd and their daughter Ivy Withrow, who was fifteen when they wrote the screenplay. They cast the lead roles of the girls from students at Hallie Todd Studios.

The film was directed by veteran actor Glenn Withrow and was shot on location in Northern Idaho and Eastern Washington. The river sequences were shot on Lake Coeur d'Alene, Chatcolet Lake and the Saint Joe River in Idaho. The camping sequences were shot at Priest Lake, ID, and Rocky Point and Plummer Point, near St. Maries, ID. The rappelling scenes were all shot in Spokane, WA.

== Release ==
The Mooring premiered at Switzerland's Neuchatel International Fantastic Film Festival on July 8, 2012, airing during their Ultra Movies screenings.

Lionsgate released the movie on Redbox on February 12, 2013 and on DVD, Digital Download and Video-on-Demand February 19, 2013. The DVD contains a "Making of The Mooring" special feature, including interviews with director Glenn Withrow, actors Hallie Todd, Thomas Wilson Brown and Erin McIntosh, as well as producer Ivy Withrow, editor Rob Jaeger, line producer Todd Kaufman, and composer Mike Jarzabek.
