= Aline Brosh McKenna =

American screenwriter, producer, and director (born 1967)

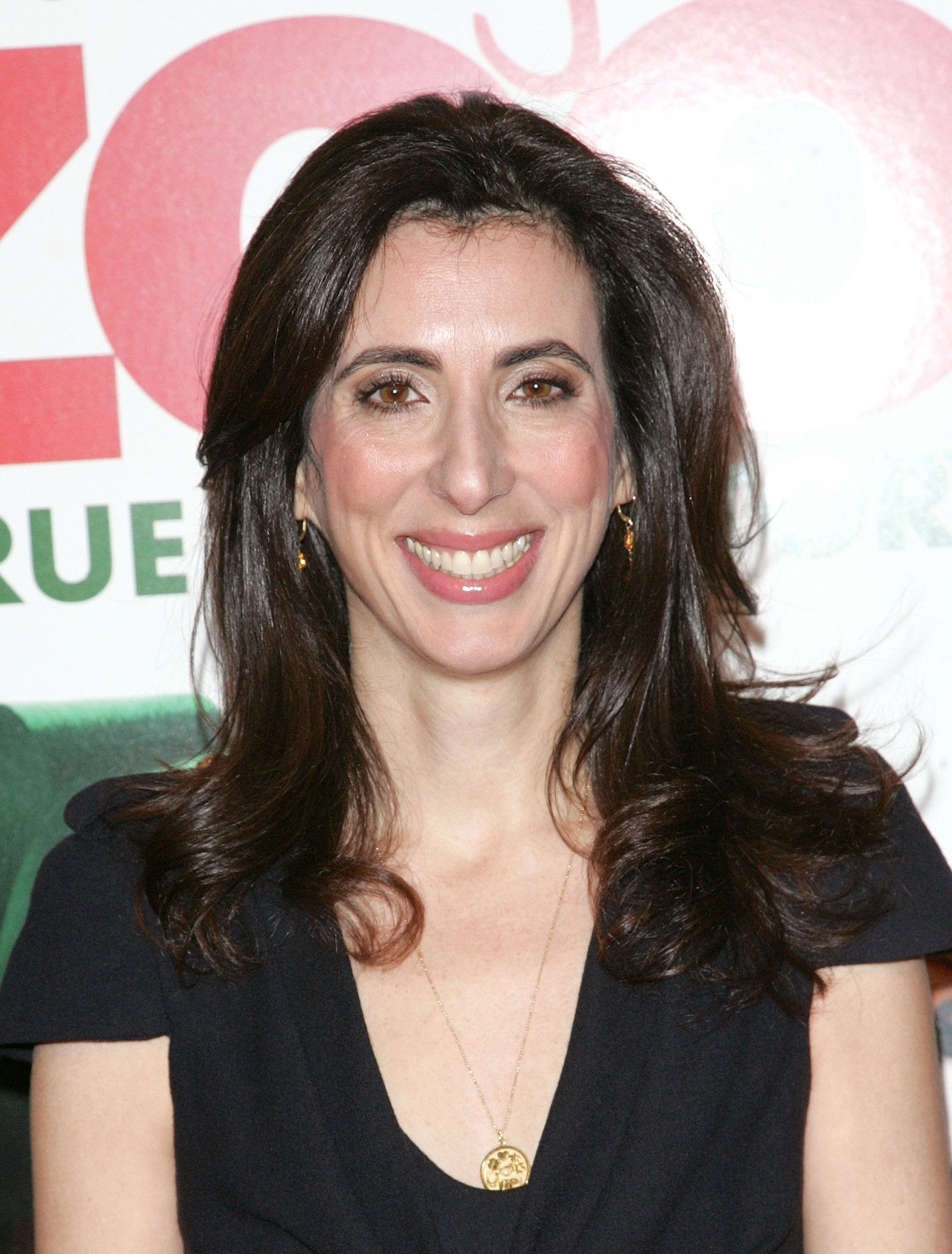
- McKenna in 2011
- Born: Aline Brosh; August 2, 1967 (age 59); France
- Education: Harvard University
- Occupations: Screenwriter, producer, director
- Spouse: Will McKenna
- Children: 2
- Writing career
- Period: Contemporary
- Notable works: The Devil Wears Prada; The Devil Wears Prada 2; 27 Dresses; Morning Glory; Crazy Ex-Girlfriend

Aline Brosh McKenna (born August 2, 1967) is an American filmmaker. Her credits include writing The Devil Wears Prada (2006) and its 2026 sequel, 27 Dresses (2008), Morning Glory (2010), We Bought a Zoo (2011) and co-creating The CW's Crazy Ex-Girlfriend.

== Early life and education ==
Brosh was born to a Jewish family in France and, at the age of six months, moved with her family to New Jersey, where she lived variously in Fort Lee, Demarest and Montvale, and attended Saddle River Day School in Saddle River. She graduated magna cum laude from Harvard University.

== Career ==
After graduating, McKenna moved to New York City to seek a job in publishing. While there, she did some freelance writing work.

A script she wrote during a six-week course in screenwriting at New York University helped her get an agent, and, in 1991, she moved to Los Angeles. By age 26, she had sold a comedy feature and a television pilot, and continued to write a number of feature and television scripts. She also wrote an episode of Margaret Cho's sitcom All American Girl.

However, it would be eight years until her first movie, 1999's Matthew Perry-Neve Campbell romantic comedy Three to Tango, was produced.

In 2004, she wrote Laws of Attraction, starring Pierce Brosnan and Julianne Moore.

She adapted Lauren Weisberger’s novel The Devil Wears Prada into the 2006 film of the same name, directed by David Frankel and starring Meryl Streep, Anne Hathaway and Emily Blunt. Though her first two produced features were both romantic comedies, McKenna has reiterated that The Devil Wears Prada is not, and has instead described it as 'competence porn', noting: 'The real love story is, she ends up with that newspaper, having understood the world better and having understood her naiveté better'. The film earned McKenna a BAFTA nomination for Best Adapted Screenplay.

McKenna explored the nuances of the characters of Miranda (Meryl Streep's character) and Andy (Anne Hathaway's character) in The Devil Wears Prada in a 2006 interview with Jan Lisa Huttner:

"I wanted to make sure the audience understood why she had so much power in her world; and then understand that there was a cost for her, because we wanted Andy to walk away from a life as opposed to walking away from a person. She sees how much Miranda has sacrificed in her personal life, and that’s just not what Andy wants to do. Miranda’s held to a different standard than male executives might be held to, and she lives under a microscope."

She wrote 27 Dresses starring Katherine Heigl in 2008. It tells the story of a bridesmaid of twenty-seven weddings finding her own love.

Her next produced movie was 2010's Morning Glory, starring Rachel McAdams, Harrison Ford and Diane Keaton, followed shortly after by 2011's adaptation I Don't Know How She Does It, with Sarah Jessica Parker and Pierce Brosnan. McKenna has jokingly referred to The Devil Wears Prada, Morning Glory and I Don't Know How She Does It as 'The Blackberry 3', a thematically-linked trio of films featuring women who see their Blackberries more than they see their own families. In an interview for The Ringer, McKenna compared that lifestyle to her own as a showrunner: "Striving for perfection, you can easily end up having it fill all the gaps in your life because that’s the kind of job, like being a showrunner, that you’re never done, you’re never finished, you could always be doing something else."

In the same year, McKenna wrote Cameron Crowe's We Bought a Zoo, an adaptation of the novel of the same name by Benjamin Mee. The film received positive reviews overall, with a London Evening Standard critic commenting, "You have to admire the thoroughness with which We Bought a Zoo--which is the film Disney would make if they still knew how--caters to the whole family."

In 2014, she wrote the musical comedy-drama Annie, directed by Will Gluck and with Quvenzhané Wallis in the title role. The film was a contemporary adaptation of the 1977 Broadway musical of the same name.

McKenna returned to television in 2015, when she teamed up with singer and comedian Rachel Bloom to create the romantic musical comedy-drama Crazy Ex-Girlfriend. The show was originally developed for Showtime, with a half hour pilot produced. When Showtime opted not to proceed, McKenna and Bloom reworked the series for The CW, including expanding it into an hour-long format. The CW renewed the series for a second season, which premiered on October 21, 2016, and a third season, which premiered on October 13, 2017. McKenna is the series' showrunner and an executive producer.

In a 2018 interview for Deadline, when asked about Crazy Ex-Girlfriend's commentary on gender, she said:

I mean it’s so fun to poke fun at. There are also still lots of things that haven’t been talked about. You still have to fight to get the word clitoris on the air and people still freak out when you talk about periods. We’re taking on some other gynecology because it’s always fun for us and threatening to the patriarchy.

In March 2017, McKenna inked a two-year overall deal with CBS Television Studios, the studio behind Crazy Ex-Girlfriend, to develop new projects for network and cable through her production company Lean Machine. The following October, she teamed up with Rene Gube, a producer and recurring guest star on Crazy Ex-Girlfriend, for a single-camera comedy called Big Men that has been set up at CBS.

McKenna made her graphic novel debut in late 2017, working with artist Ramon Perez on Jane, a modern retelling of Charlotte Brontë's 1847 novel Jane Eyre. The graphic novel was published by Boom! Studios.

=== Scriptnotes ===
McKenna was the first ever guest on the screenwriting podcast Scriptnotes, hosted by John August and Craig Mazin. She made her debut on the show's 60th episode, a live event at the Austin Film Festival in October 2012. She is, by a long distance, the podcast's most frequent guest, having made over two dozen appearances in subsequent years. In recognition, Mazin christened her 'the Joan Rivers of Scriptnotes'. McKenna guest-hosted the podcast for an episode in January 2014, filling in for Mazin.

== Filmography ==
=== Film ===
Year	Title	Director	Writer	Producer	Notes
1999	Three to Tango	No	Yes	No	
2004	Laws of Attraction	No	Yes	No	
2006	The Devil Wears Prada	No	Yes	No	Nominated- BAFTA Award for Best Adapted Screenplay; Nominated- Writers Guild of America Award for Best Adapted Screenplay
2008	27 Dresses	No	Yes	No	
2010	Morning Glory	No	Yes	No	
2011	I Don't Know How She Does It	No	Yes	Executive	
2011	We Bought a Zoo	No	Yes	No	
2014	Annie	No	Yes	No	
2021	Cruella	No	Story	No	
2023	Your Place or Mine	Yes	Yes	Yes	Directorial debut
2026	The Devil Wears Prada 2	No	Yes	Executive	

=== Television ===
Year	Title	Director	Writer	Executive Producer	Notes
1995	All-American Girl	No	Yes	No	Episode "Young Americans"
2015–2019	Crazy Ex-Girlfriend	Yes	Yes	Yes	Also co-creator and showrunner; Made an uncredited appearance as the prosecutor in episode "I Want to Be Here"
