= The Union (2011 film) =

2011 film by Cameron Crowe

- Directed by: Cameron Crowe
- Written by: Cameron Crowe
- Produced by: Cameron Crowe
- Starring: Elton John; Leon Russell; Neil Young; Brian Wilson; Booker T. Jones; Robert Randolph; Stevie Nicks; Don Was; T-Bone Burnett; Bernie Taupin
- Release date: April 20, 2011
- Country: United States
- Language: English

The Union is a 2011 documentary film by Cameron Crowe exploring the creative process of musician Elton John and the making of the 2010 album The Union.

== Synopsis ==
In November 2009, filmmaker Cameron Crowe began filming a behind-the-scenes look at the creation of the album The Union, a collaboration between musicians Elton John and Leon Russell, who hadn't spoken to one another in 38 years prior to beginning work on the album. In addition, the documentary offers a rare glimpse into the process John goes through to create and compose his music.

Featured in the film are musicians Neil Young, Brian Wilson, Booker T. Jones, steel guitarist Robert Randolph, Don Was and a 10-piece gospel choir who all contribute to the album, which is produced by award-winning producer T-Bone Burnett. Musician Stevie Nicks and John's long-time lyricist Bernie Taupin also appear.

On March 2, 2011, the documentary was announced to open the 2011 Tribeca Film Festival.

In June 2011, HBO announced it had acquired US TV rights and would begin airing the documentary in January 2012.
