= Dartmoor Zoological Park =

Dartmoor Zoological Society

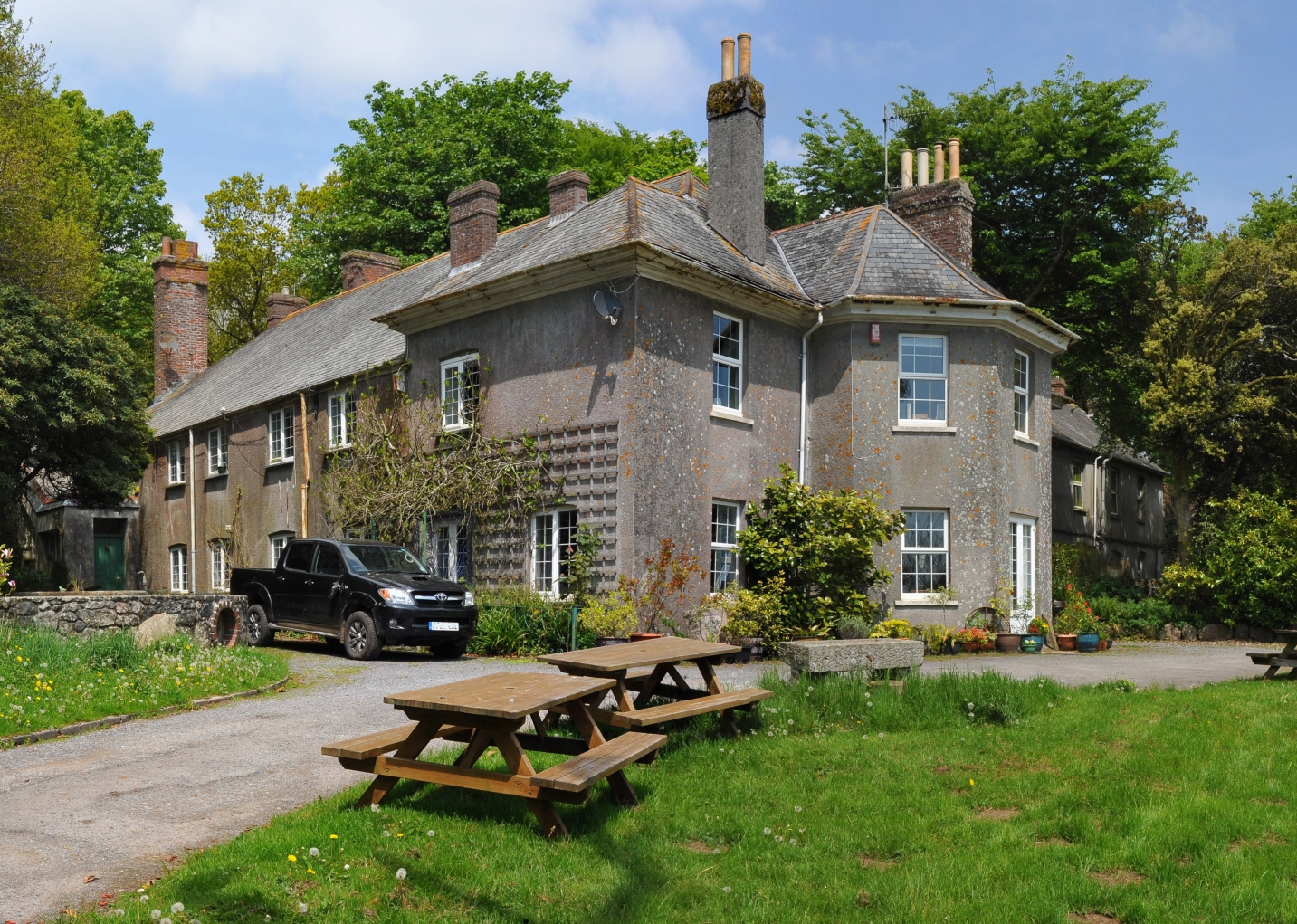
- Goodamoor House, the historic house the zoo was built around
- Interactive map of Dartmoor Zoological Society
- 50.407°N 3.997°W
- Date opened: 1968
- Location: Dartmoor, England
- Land area: 33 acres (13 ha)
- Annual visitors: 80,000 (2016)
- Memberships: BIAZA
- Website: www.dartmoorzoo.org.uk

Dartmoor Zoological Society (originally Dartmoor Wildlife Park then Dartmoor Zoological Park) is a 33-acre (13 ha) zoo just north of the village of Sparkwell, on the south-west edge of Dartmoor, in the county of Devon in the South West of England. It was opened in 1968 by Ellis Daw who ran it until its licence was revoked and it was forced to close in 2006. The zoo was bought in August 2006 by Benjamin Mee, who reopened it in July 2007, later writing a book about his experiences called We Bought a Zoo (2008). A 2011 film of the same title was loosely based on the book. In September 2014 the zoo became the charity Dartmoor Zoological Society, a charity that focuses on conservation, education and research.

== History ==
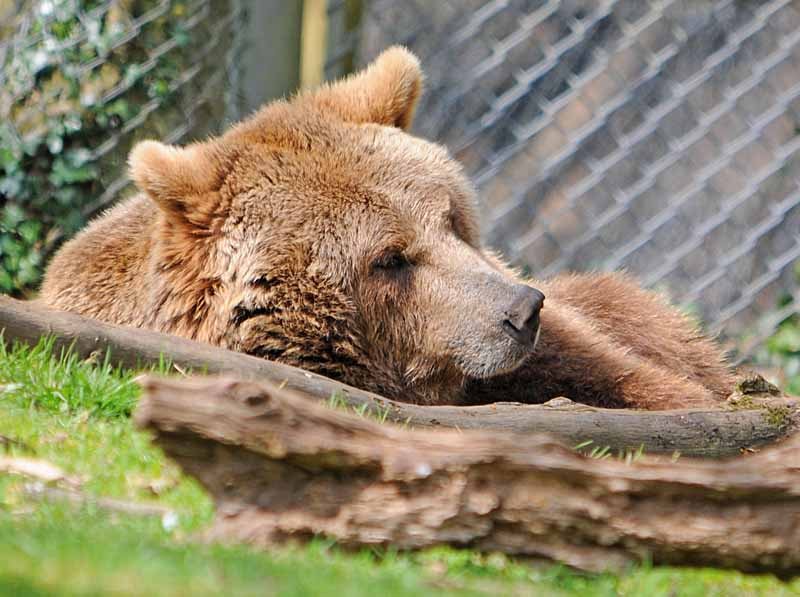
Brown bear

The zoo was opened as Dartmoor Wildlife Park by Ellis Daw in 1968 on the Goodamoor Estate that his family had bought in 1948. Goodamoor House was built in the 17th century by Paul Ourry Treby of the Treby family in the parish of Plymton St Mary. The Treby family lived on the estate until the late 19th century.

In the following years Daw acquired many species to add to his collection, including lions and tigers, jaguars and pumas. He was also instrumental in the design and construction of many of the buildings and enclosures around the park.

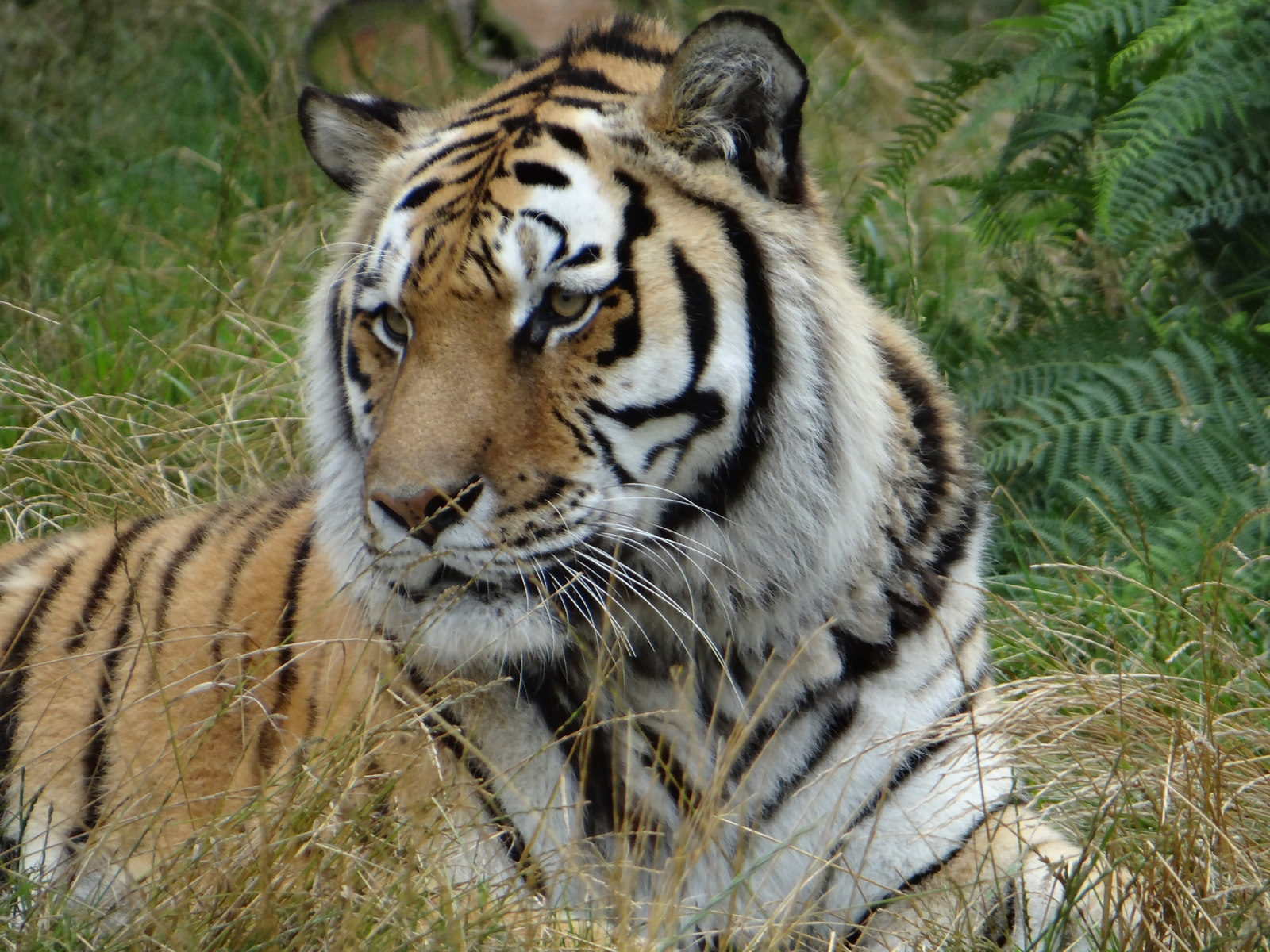
Tiger

Dartmoor Wildlife Park became the subject of local debate after a 2001 report by the Captive Animals Protection Society raised questions about the welfare of the animals and the conditions in which they were kept. The group criticised the living conditions for the animals and the safety barriers, calling for the zoo's licence to be revoked. Ellis Daw denied the allegations, pointing to the lack of accidents in the zoo's 33-year history. The council was reluctant to revoke the zoo's licence, due to concerns over the future of the animals, but did charge Ellis Daw with 16 offences after the zoo was investigated. All but one of these charges were dropped, but Daw was found guilty of breeding Siberian tigers outside of an organised breeding programme, and of keeping them in poor conditions. For this, Daw received a £200 fine and a conditional discharge, and the tigers were sent to a wildlife centre in the Netherlands.

The zoo closed to the public on 23 April 2006. Ellis Daw's autobiography, From the Lamb to the Tiger, in which he recorded the history of the zoo during the time that he owned it, was published in 2011. Next to the house is a large block of granite on which is inscribed:

ELLIS BOWEN DAW - Born 15th September 1928 - FOUNDER OF DARTMOOR WILDLIFE PARK 29 JUNE 1968 - Here's to those who wish me well and those who don't can go to hell!

In August 2006, the Wildlife Park was bought for £1.1 million by the Mee family, consisting of the matriarch Amelia Mee and four out of five of her children, including Benjamin Mee. Four days after the family moved in, the jaguar escaped. He was later anaesthetised and captured after leaping into the nearby tiger enclosure. The following February the zoo obtained the £500,000 it needed for refurbishment of the site and reopened as the rebranded Dartmoor Zoological Park on 7 July 2007.

The zoo has been a member of BIAZA (the British and Irish Association of Zoos and Aquariums) since 2011 and as a result is able to obtain animals from other BIAZA collections, as well as move certain animals on to other collections in order to become part of breeding programmes. In 2011 the zoo was awarded Eden's Top Wildlife Attraction of the year.

In September 2014 the zoo became a charity after raising £340,000 by crowdfunding.

In July 2016 a lynx escaped from the zoo and was free in the Devon countryside for more than three weeks before being recaptured.

In April 2025, the zoo launched Annual Passes. All general admission tickets come with the option of an Annual Pass free of charge, allowing guests to come back as often as they'd like for 12 months from the date of purchase.

== We Bought A Zoo ==
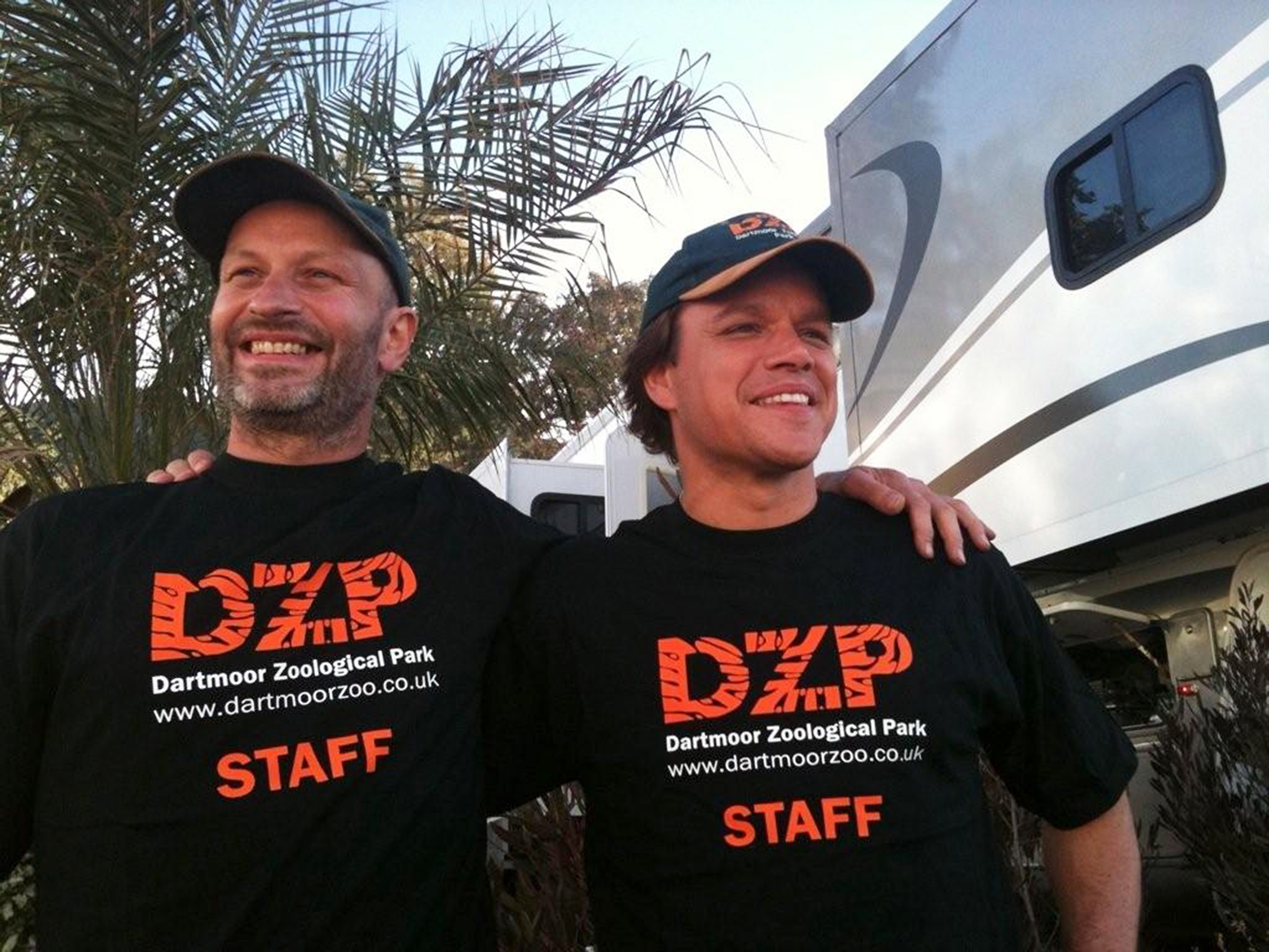
Zoo owner Benjamin Mee (left) with actor Matt Damon (right) playing him on the set of We Bought a Zoo

A four part television documentary entitled Ben's Zoo was broadcast in 2006. It followed the story of Mee and his staff as they worked to rebuild the park. In 2008 Benjamin Mee published a book titled We Bought a Zoo, about his and his family's experiences within the zoo.

The book was loosely adapted into a 2011 film, We Bought a Zoo. It was directed by Cameron Crowe following a rewrite of the original adaptation written by Aline Brosh McKenna. The film, starring Matt Damon, Scarlett Johansson, Colin Ford and Maggie Elizabeth Jones, was released in the U.S. and other major territories on 23 December 2011, and in the UK on 16 March 2012. In the film adaptation the zoo is called Rosemoor Wildlife Park, and is situated in the United States. The story also differs in that Mee buys the zoo after the death of his wife, whereas she died aged 40 of a brain tumour several months after the purchase. Mee and his children have cameo roles within the film.

== Animal collection ==
Dartmoor Zoological Park has over 73 different animal species, including some endangered and critically endangered species. The zoo has a breeding programme with Asian Short-clawed otters, Amur Leopard and Carpathian Lynx to name a few.

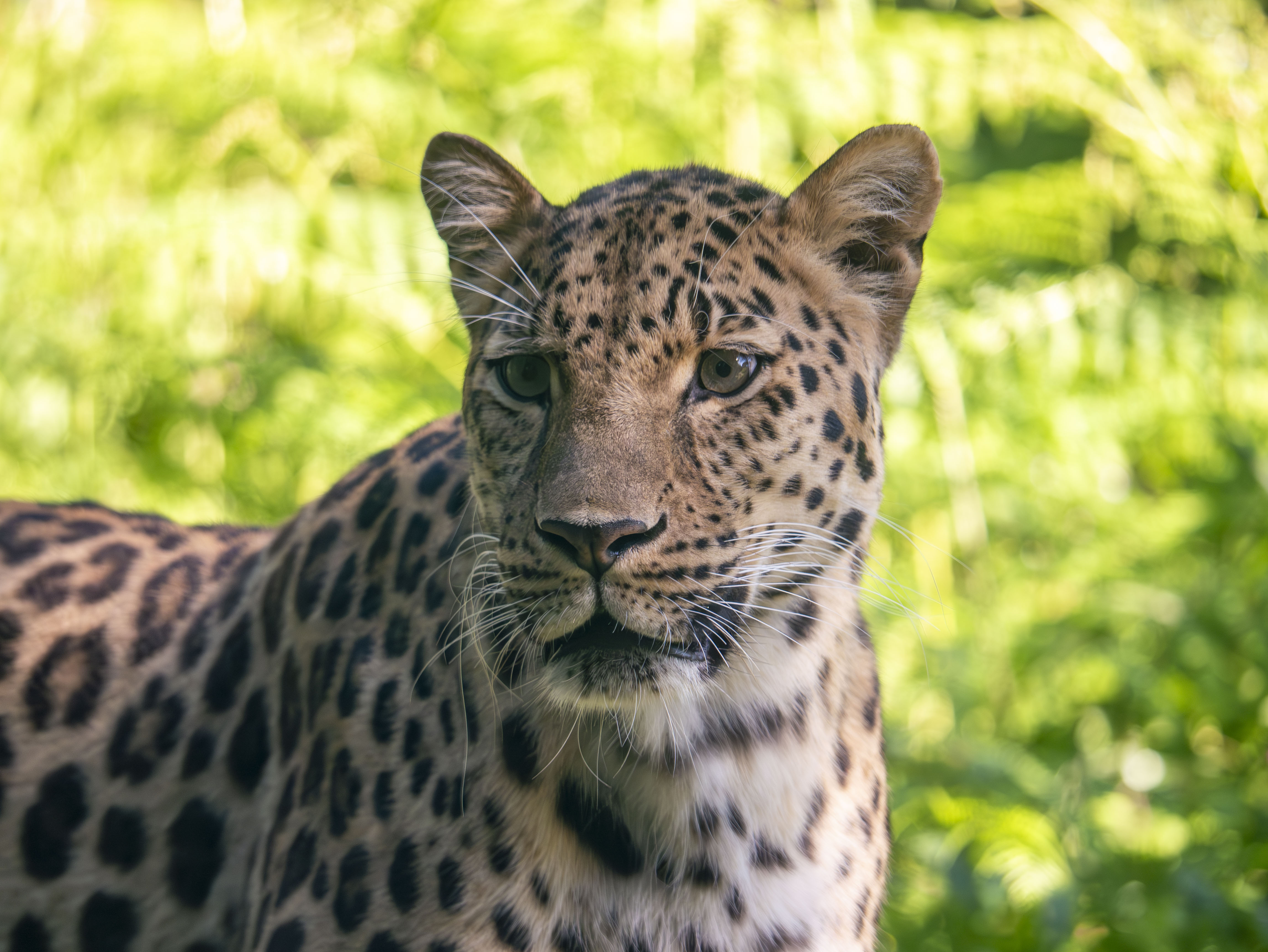
Freddo the Amur Leopard at Dartmoor Zoo

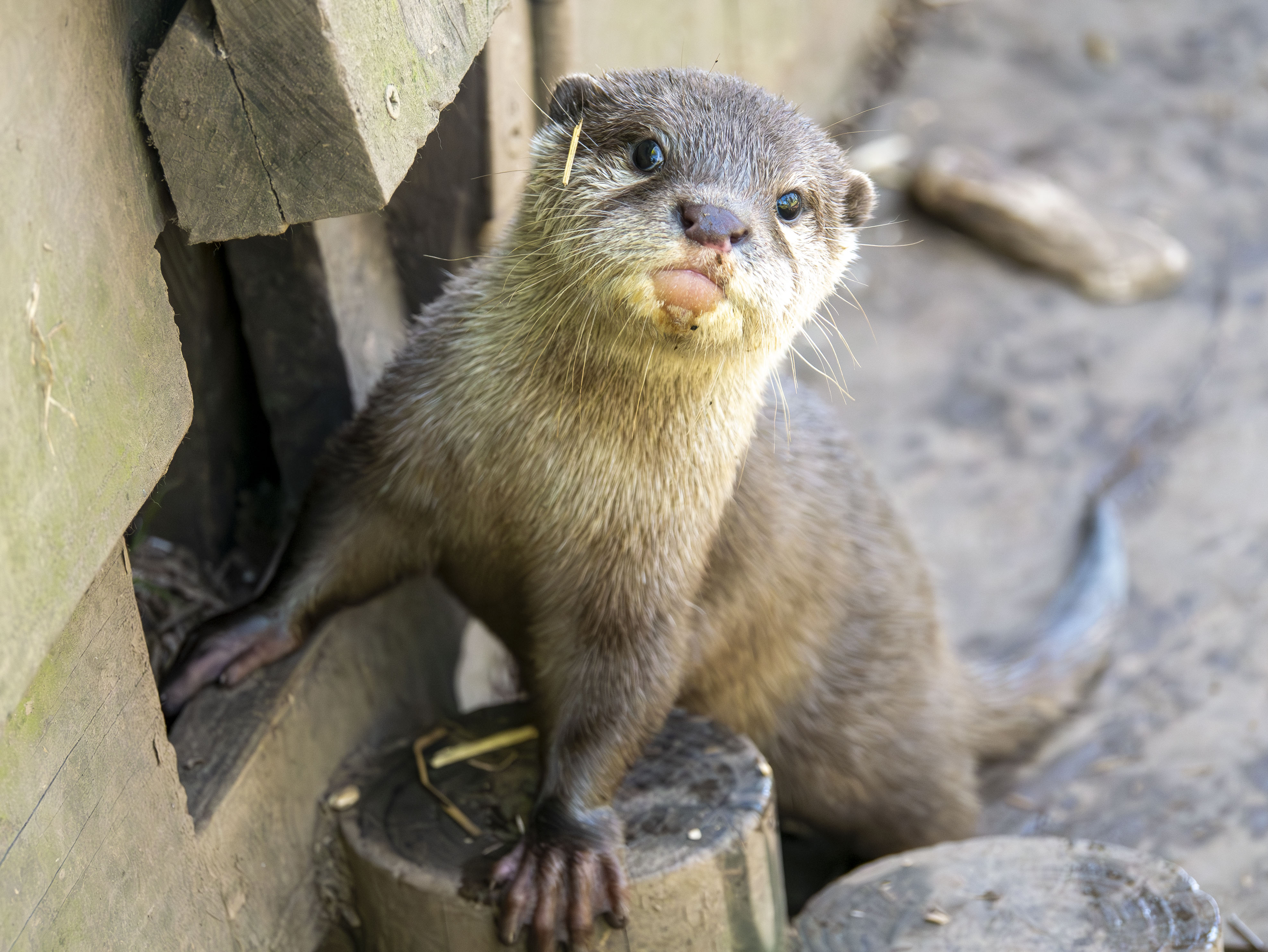
Asian Short-clawed otter pup at Dartmoor Zoo

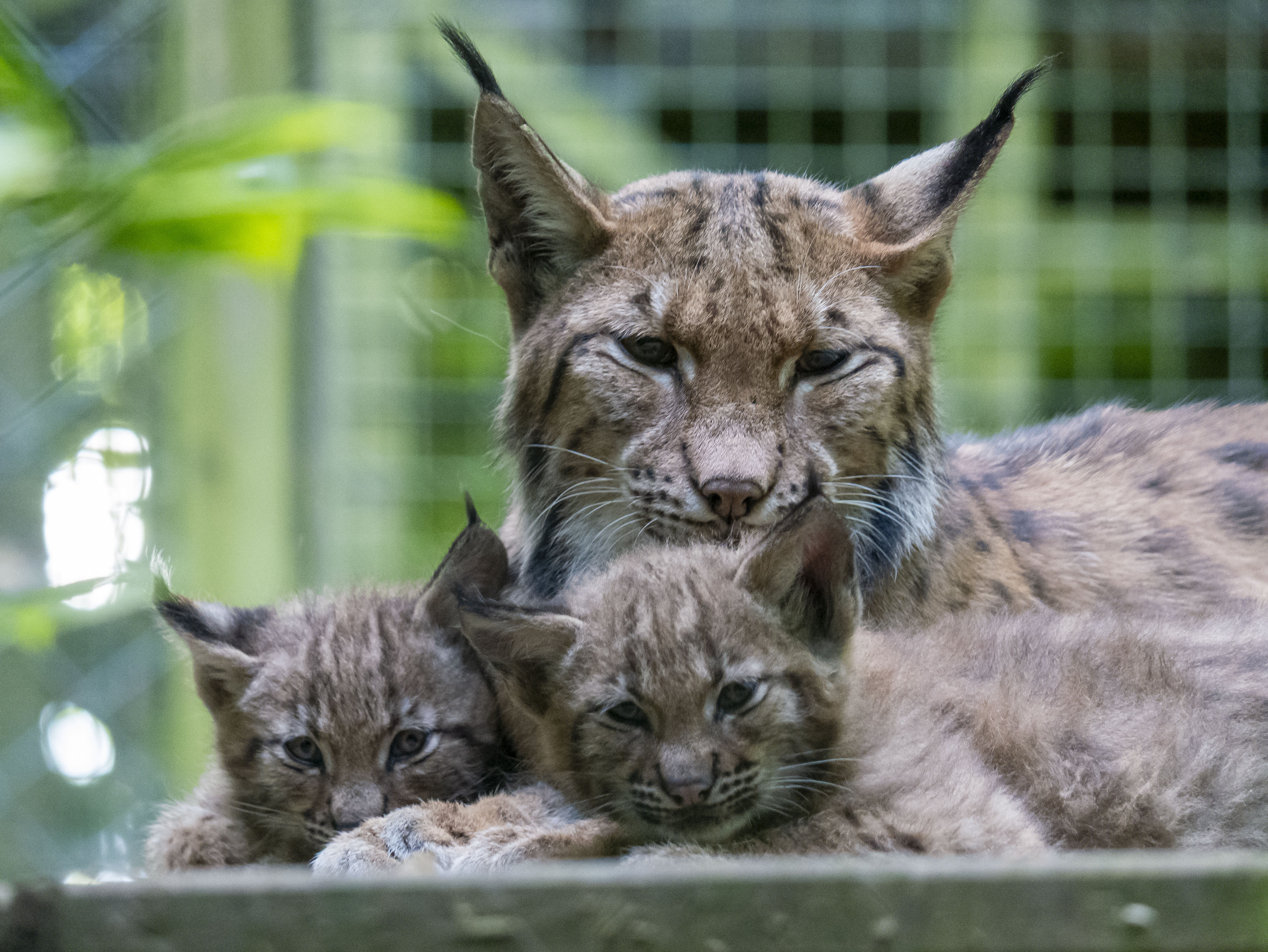
Emily the Carpathian Lynx with her Kittens at Dartmoor Zoo

Mammals:

- Amur Leopards
- African lion
- Amur tiger
- Asian short-clawed otters
- Azara's agoutis
- Brazilian tapirs
- Capybaras
- Carpathian lynx
- Geladas
- Grant's zebra
- Iberian wolves
- Jaguar
- Kirk's dik-diks
- Long-nosed potoroo
- Northern Luzon cloud rats
- Patagonian maras
- Scottish wildcat
- Slender-tailed meerkats
- White-faced saki monkeys
- White-lipped peccarys

Birds:

- Blue-and-yellow macaws
- Great horned owls
- Greater rheas
- Indian peafowls
- Laughing Kookaburras
- Lilac-breasted roller
- Ostriches
- Scarlet macaws
- White-cheeked turacos
- Grey crowned cranes

Reptiles:

- European adders
- Crested geckos
- Egyptian tortoise
- Geyr's spiny-tailed lizard
- Inland bearded dragon
- Lau banded iguana
- Leaf tail gecko
- Madagascar giant day gecko
- Pancake tortoise
- Royal python
- Western hognose snake
- Yellow-headed day gecko

Amphibians:

- Golden mantella frogs
- Chinese emperor newt

Invertebrates:

- Chilean rose tarantula
- Purple clawed hermit crab
- Tiger land snails
