= Ben and Kate =

2012 American television sitcom

- Genre: Sitcom
- Created by: Dana Fox
- Starring: Dakota Johnson; Nat Faxon; Lucy Punch; Maggie Elizabeth Jones; Echo Kellum
- Theme music composer: Michael Andrews
- Opening theme: "Get Up Again" by Michael Andrews
- Composer: Michael Andrews
- Country of origin: United States
- Original language: English
- No. of seasons: 1
- No. of episodes: 16 (3 unaired in the U.S.)

Production
- Executive producers: Peter Chernin; Dana Fox; Katherine Pope; Jake Kasdan; John Quaintance; David Feeney; David Katzenberg
- Producers: Megan Mascena Gaspar; Sam Sklaver; Randy Cordray; Alex Cuthbertson; Matt Fusfeld; Lorena Scafaria; Gail Ferner
- Camera setup: Single-camera
- Running time: 21–23 minutes
- Production companies: Hemingway Drive Productions; Chernin Entertainment; 20th Century Fox Television

Original release
- Network: Fox
- Release: September 25, 2012 – January 22, 2013

Ben and Kate is an American single-camera sitcom television series created by Dana Fox. It ran on Fox from September 25, 2012 to January 22, 2013, as part of the 2012–13 television season. The series stars Dakota Johnson and Nat Faxon as siblings. It was produced by 20th Century Fox Television and Chernin Entertainment. Fox also served as an executive producer, alongside Peter Chernin, Katherine Pope, and Jake Kasdan.

== Synopsis ==
The series focuses on a brother and sister who at first seem to be exact opposites: Ben is an over-the-top dreamer and professional underachiever, while younger sister Kate is a more practical single mother working as a bar manager. After visiting their home in Los Angeles, Ben realizes that his sister needs help with her life and taking care of her six-year-old daughter, Maddie. Because of this, he moves in with Kate so he can discover some of the things he has missed out on and Kate hopes to return the favor by bringing her brother back to reality. Along the way, they are surrounded by their close friends, B.J. and Tommy.

== Cast and characters ==
=== Main ===
- Dakota Johnson as Katherine "Kate" Fox, a neurotic and awkward yet earnest single mom who works as a bartender. Her college boyfriend broke up with her once she became pregnant with Maddie and she is since wary of the dating world.
- Nat Faxon as Benjamin "Ben" Fox, Kate's goofy older brother who moves into her house. Despite being caught in a state of arrested development, Ben is very popular and protective of his family. He frequently tries his hand at inventing and entrepreneurship, though few attempts pan out. His ideas include "Bunk Bed Pizza", which makes another friend rich, and, more recently, "Rail Mall", which he actually focuses on turning into a reality.
- Lucy Punch as BJ (Beatrice Joan) Harrison, Kate's much more confident best friend and co-worker. A vain hard partier, BJ is secretly married to Ben, despite the two sharing no feelings for each other. She often lectures Maddie at a level beyond her understanding. Although she has a British accent, she reveals she's actually from Texas.
- Maggie Elizabeth Jones as Madeline "Maddie" Fox, Kate's 6-year-old daughter.
- Echo Kellum as Tommy, Ben's charismatic best friend who works at a country club as a tennis instructor. In addition to sharing many of Ben's quirks, Tommy has been in love with Kate since high school. He is also a frequent collaborator on Ben's quirky schemes and business ideas.

=== Recurring ===
- Geoff Stults as Will, a friendly single dad and neighbor who briefly dates Kate. Though they have chemistry, he becomes wary of her eccentric friends and family.
- Rob Corddry as Buddy, the boorish owner of the bar where Kate and BJ work, also BJ's on-and-off boyfriend.
- Brittany Snow as Lila, Tommy's girlfriend.
- Melinda McGraw as Vera, a successful businesswoman who is physically attracted to Ben and helps his "Rail Mall" idea become an actual business.
- Lauren Miller as Darcy, Ben's ex, whom he is still in love with when the series begins.
- Luka Jones as Lance, a laid-back baker who begins to date Kate after she breaks up with Will.
- Bruce McGill as Randy Fox, Ben and Kate's negligent yet friendly father.

== Production ==
=== Development ===
In October 2011, Fox bought the project, titled Ben Fox is My Manny, from creator Dana Fox. In January 2012, Fox ordered the show to pilot. The show was retitled to Ned Fox Is My Manny, then to The Kids, before finally being called Ben and Kate. On 9 May Fox ordered the show to series. On 14 May Neil Goldman and Garrett Donovan were announced as showrunners. On 11 September, it was announced that Goldman and Donovan had left the show. Goldman and Donovan cited creative differences as their reason for leaving. On October 8, 2012, Fox ordered a full season of 19 episodes of the series, that took the series beyond its initial 13 episode order. On 9 November it was announced that John Quaintance and David Feeney would become the new showrunners.

=== Casting ===
Maggie Elizabeth Jones was the first actor announced to have been cast, on February 1, 2012. On February 14, Echo Kellum was announced as Tommy, Ben's best friend. On February 23, Abby Elliott was announced to star as Kate Fox. On February 24, Lucy Punch was announced as BJ, Kate's best friend. On February 28, Nat Faxon was announced as Ben Fox. Faxon was cast days after he won an Academy Award for co-writing The Descendants (2011). On March 20, it was announced that Elliott had been released from the show after the pilot's table read. Elliott was released because it was thought she was too young for the role. On March 21, it was announced that Austin Stowell would appear as a guest star in the role of Ryan, a character who Kate used to have a crush on and reunites with her for a date. It was reported that it would be a recurring role if the show was picked up. On 23 March, it was announced that Dakota Johnson would be replacing Elliott in the role of Kate Fox.

After the show was ordered to series, some recurring roles and guest appearances were announced. On August 14, Vernee Watson and Tom Wright were announced as Tommy's parents. On August 20, Rob Corddry was announced as Buddy, Kate's boss and BJ's boyfriend. On August 23, Lindsay Sloane was announced as Louise, an ex-girlfriend of Ben's who unexpectedly tracks him down. On September 5, Geoff Stults was announced as Will, a love interest for Kate. On November 5, Jane Seymour was announced as Wendy, BJ's mother. On November 9, Brittany Snow was announced as Lila, a love interest for Tommy. On January 10, 2013 Niecy Nash was announced as Roz, the wife of Buddy.

=== Cancellation ===
Despite the show's positive reviews, TV By the Numbers had Ben and Kate on its "likely to be cancelled" list, citing the show's disappointing 1.2 rating among 18- to 49-year-olds in an October 16 episode. The show faced stiff competition from CBS's NCIS, NBC's The Voice, and ABC's Dancing with the Stars.

On January 23, 2013, the show was pulled from the schedule. On January 25, Fox confirmed that the show had been cancelled. Of the six additional episodes ordered to take the show to a full season, only the first three had been filmed. The fourth had been shooting when the show was cancelled and would remain unfinished. Episodes 14, 15, and 16 have not yet been aired in the U.S. however were aired on March 11 and March 18 in the UK on ITV2. Fox stated that the completed three episodes would air in the future, though they did not give a date. As of October 2013, they have not aired but have been posted on online services such as the iTunes Store and Amazon.

== Episodes ==
There were 16 episodes in Ben and Kate's single season.

No.	Title	Directed by	Written by	Original release date	Prod. code	U.S. viewers (millions)
1	"Pilot"	Jake Kasdan	Dana Fox	September 25, 2012	1AVE79	4.21
Ben Fox discovers that his ex-girlfriend, Darcy (Lauren Miller), is getting married so Ben sets out to crash the wedding. Meanwhile, Kate gets advice from her friend BJ on how to obtain more sex appeal on her first date with her new boyfriend, George (Jon Foster). As a result, their first date is disastrous. Ben then finds out that George is cheating on her. Ben rushes to tell Kate about George's infidelity. George makes up a lame excuse on why he is with another woman; shortly after, Kate breaks up with him. Elsewhere, Ben only has fifteen minutes to crash the wedding, but he is too late. In the end, Ben moves in with Kate and her daughter Maddie.
2	"Bad Cop/Bad Cop"	Jake Kasdan	Dana Fox	October 2, 2012	1AVE01	3.32
Ben finishes settling in Kate's home. Meanwhile, Kate lies about her residence to get Maddie into a better school district, but when her plan falls apart, she must admit the truth to Maddie's principal (Alan Ruck). Additionally, Kate tells Ben that he needs to be more strict when disciplining Maddie.
3	"The Fox Hunt"	Gail Mancuso	John Quaintance	October 9, 2012	1AVE02	3.23
Ben and Kate argue over how Kate is supposedly the "worker bee" and he is the "king". Kate is annoyed by the fact the Ben thinks he is high and mighty, so Kate wants to prove to him that she is better than him by finally beating him at the fox hunt, a scavenger hunt that they used to play with their grandfather. Kate and BJ team up against Ben and Tom to see who comes out victorious.
4	"21st Birthday"	David Katzenberg	David Feeney	October 16, 2012	1AVE04	2.70
Kate's 26th birthday is coming up. She is incredibly upset that she never had a 21st birthday party because she had Maddie at that time, so Ben throws Kate a much belated 21st birthday party. Meanwhile, Kate reunites with an old friend, Molly, much to BJ's dismay. Plus, Ben finds out that Darcy has moved into her parents’ house with her husband, a plan she and Ben had when they were dating.
5	"Emergency Kit"	Peter Sollett	Dana Fox	October 23, 2012	1AVE03	2.99
Ben creates a fake emergency situation to prove to Kate that it is okay to not be prepared for everything. Meanwhile, Ben's on-and-off girlfriend Louise (Lindsay Sloane), continually shows up unexpectedly. Elsewhere, Kate convinces BJ not to sleep with their boss Buddy (Rob Corddry), after going on a first date.
6	"Scaredy Kate"	Fred Goss	Matt Fusfeld & Alex Cuthbertson	October 30, 2012	1AVE05	3.01
Kate and BJ are invited to Kate's handsome neighbor's Halloween party. Since Kate really likes him, BJ teaches her how to be more sexy and appealing. Meanwhile, Ben and Tommy decide to stay home to give out candy in hopes of meeting hot moms, but the night takes an unexpected twist when Tommy accidentally eats BJ's "candy" from Amsterdam. Later in the night, Kate meets Will (Geoff Stults), a single dad who shares the same personality traits as her.
7	"Career Day"	Jay Chandrasekhar	Lorene Scafaria	November 13, 2012	1AVE06	2.39
Ben tries to pursue a career as a wine seller before he speaks at Maddie's career day at her school. Ben continually intrudes on Kate and Will's relationship. BJ feels she is not liked by the waiting staff at the bar.
8	"Reunion"	Daisy Mayer	Lindsey Shockley	November 20, 2012	1AVE07	2.35
The gang goes to a Thanksgiving Eve party where Kate relives horrible high school memories.
9	"Guitar Face"	Matt Sohn	David Feeney & John Quaintance	November 27, 2012	1AVE08	2.82
Kate is turned off by the face that Will makes when he is playing guitar for his ZZ Top cover band. Tommy gets Ben a job at the country club where he works. BJ goes to a support group for divorced women, when she feels that Kate is ignoring her to spend time with Will.
10	"The Trip"	Lynn Shelton	Gail Lerner	December 4, 2012	1AVE09	2.60
Kate finds out that Will has a large money inheritance from his family, which makes Ben further suspicious of Will. Ben and Maddie tag along on Kate and Will's camping trip. BJ tries to help Tommy move on from Kate. Tommy then meets Lila (Brittany Snow), a woman he bumped into, while she was walking her dog.
11	"B-Squad"	Rob Schrab	Laura Valdivia	January 8, 2013	1AVE10	2.36
Kate tries to get Maddie in an advanced placement class. Ben finds out that Matt Swan (David Hornsby), an old college roommate who is now quite wealthy, stole his idea of an extraordinary pizza. BJ's mother, Wendy (Jane Seymour), visits her.
12	"Girl Problems"	David Katzenberg	Matt Fusfeld & Alex Cuthbertson	January 15, 2013	1AVE11	2.20
Now that Tommy and Lila are dating, Kate tries to be friends with her, but ends up making matters worse. Ben tries get his idea of a Rail Mall (a train alternative to SkyMall) funded by Vera (Melinda McGraw), a businesswoman who is only in business with him for sex.
13	"Bake-Off"	Fred Goss	Sam Sklaver	January 22, 2013	1AVE12	2.53
Kate tries to move on after breaking up with Will. Ben and Tommy find themselves in disagreement with Vera's associates concerning Rail Mall. BJ pretends to be Maddie's mother for a commercial audition.
14	"Gone Fishin'"	David Katzenberg	John Quaintance	March 11, 2013 (UK); Unaired (US)	1AVE13	N/A
Kate starts asking big questions about herself and her life trajectory, causing a big fight between her and BJ, meanwhile, Ben confronts his dad (Bruce McGill) about all the things they never did together. Special guest Jennette McCurdy.
15	"Father-Daughter Dance"	Michael Patrick Jann	David Feeney	March 18, 2013 (UK); Unaired (US)	1AVE14	N/A
The siblings' dad Randy closes a business deal with Kate's help, leaving Ben feeling sidelined. Ben tries to upstage Kate by volunteering to organise the annual father-daughter dance at Maddie's school.
16	"Ethics 101" "We're All Here Anyway"	Jay Chandrasekhar	Lindsey Shockley	March 18, 2013 (UK); Unaired (US)	1AVE15	N/A
Kate returns to college, determined to focus on her studies instead of boys this time around. Ben is excited to celebrate his two-month anniversary with girlfriend Vera.

== Broadcast ==
Ben and Kate premiered in Australia on October 8, 2012 on Network Ten. The show premiered in the United Kingdom January 7, 2013 on ITV2. In Canada, the program premiered on September 25, 2012 on City in a simulcast with the U.S. showing.

== Reception ==
For the most part, Ben and Kate has been moderately received, obtaining a score of 67 out of 100 on Metacritic, indicating generally favorable reviews. On Rotten Tomatoes, the series has an aggregate score of 73% based on 29 positive and 11 negative critic reviews. The website’s consensus reads: " It may not be a laugh riot, but Ben and Kate sports a likable cast and just enough funny -- with a touch of charm -- to make it worth rooting for."
