= Thomas Wilson Brown =

American actor

- Born: December 27, 1972 (age 53); Lusk, Wyoming, United States
- Years active: 1984–present

Thomas Wilson Brown (born December 27, 1972) is an American actor, who began his career by playing "Augie" in the western film Silverado.

== Career ==
The son of a cattle rancher and rodeo queen, Brown received his first role by answering a small advertisement in a local Santa Fe, New Mexico, newspaper, which was looking for a young boy who could ride a horse.

After the completion of Silverado (credited as Tom Brown), he worked in a number of films during his teenage years. He is known for his roles as "Jason Lochner" in the television drama Knots Landing, his notable film role as "Little Russ Thompson" (credited as Thomas Brown) in Honey, I Shrunk the Kids, and for his co-starring role in Welcome Home, Roxy Carmichael.

In 1993, Brown appeared on Beverly Hills, 90210 (episode "The Game is Chicken") as the rebellious character Joe. He also had some appearances in TV series like CSI, Daybreak, Nash Bridges, and Walker, Texas Ranger. He also played a small role in the 2007 Steven Seagal movie Urban Justice. Smaller roles include Our House.

In 2010, Brown co-starred in the independent thriller The Mooring.

In 2017, Brown co-starred in Last Three Days.

== Filmography ==
Year	Title	Role	Notes
1985	Silverado	Augie	film, credited as Tom Brown
1986	Down The Long Hill’s	Hardy Collins	film
1987	Family Sins	Bryan Williams	film
1987	St. Elsewhere	Elvis	Episode: "Rites of Passage"
1989	Honey, I Shrunk the Kids	Little Russ Thompson	film, credited as Thomas Brown
1989	Welcome Home	Tyler	film
1990	Welcome Home, Roxy Carmichael	Gerald Howells	film
1990–1991	Knots Landing	Jason Lochner	Recurring role, seasons 12–13
1992	Diggstown	Robby Gillon	film
1993	Beverly Hills, 90210	Joe Wardlow	Episode: "The Game Is Chicken"
1993, 1994	Boy Meets World	Announcer	3 episodes, credited as Thomas Brown IV
1994	Days of Our Lives	Keith	Recurring role
1995	Wild Bill	Drover	film
1998	Walker, Texas Ranger	Matthew 'Preacher' Walsh	Episode: "Saving Grace"
2001	Pearl Harbor	Young Flier	film
2001	P.O.V.	Walther	film
2002	Flophouse	Ray	film
2003	CSI: Crime Scene Investigation	Steve Jansson	Episode: "Homebodies"
2012	The Mooring	Richard	film
2020	Prop Culture	Himself	Episode: "Honey, I Shrunk the Kids"
