= Hallie Todd =

American actress

- Born: Hallie Jane Eckstein; January 7, 1962 (age 64)
- Education: Pacific Conservatory of the Performing Arts
- Occupation: Actress
- Years active: 1976–present
- Spouse: Glenn Withrow
- Children: Ivy Withrow
- Parents: George Eckstein (father); Ann Morgan Guilbert (mother)
- Website: www.hallietodd.com

Hallie Todd (born Hallie Jane Eckstein; January 7, 1962) is an American actress. She played Penny Waters on Brothers, Jo McGuire on Lizzie McGuire, and Rhoda Markowitz on Murder, She Wrote. She also made guest appearances on such television shows as The Golden Girls, Highway to Heaven, Malcolm in the Middle, Sabrina, the Teenage Witch, and Star Trek: The Next Generation.

== Early life ==
Todd is the second child of actress Ann Morgan Guilbert and writer/producer George Eckstein. Her mother carried her to term while appearing on The Dick Van Dyke Show, although the pregnancy was not part of the story line and was covered up with loose fit clothing and close up camera angles. Todd attended Palisades Charter High School and the Pacific Conservatory of the Performing Arts.

== Career ==
She played Denise (aka "Nancy Reagan"), a teenage, homeless runaway in “The Kid,” the 1986 Christmas episode of Growing Pains. She played Penny Waters, the daughter of fictional former football player Joe Waters on the Showtime comedy series Brothers, which was her longest-lasting role. In 1990, a year after Brothers left the air, Todd moved into her next sitcom role as spunky writer-and-aspiring-comedian Kate Griffin on Going Places.

Later roles include Lal, Data's daughter on the Star Trek: The Next Generation episode "The Offspring"; Blanche's niece, Lucy, on The Golden Girls episode "Nice and Easy"; the mother in the Disney Channel original movie The Ultimate Christmas Present; Hilda's and Zelda's cousin Marigold, Amanda's mother, on Sabrina, the Teenage Witch; and Lizzie's mother, Jo McGuire, on Lizzie McGuire.

She appeared in seven episodes of Murder, She Wrote, all but one as Rhoda Markowitz, assistant to Keith Michell's sleuth, Dennis Stanton.

Todd starred in the feature film The Mooring, which she co-wrote with her husband and daughter. The film was released on DVD, digital download and Video on Demand on February 19, 2013. Todd is the co-founder of the film production company In House Media and also teaches acting classes and privately coaches.

In 2016, Todd was seen starring in Universal's An American Girl: Lea to the Rescue.

She was cast in The Last Champion, and executive produced and performed in the film. Her husband, Glenn Withrow, directed the project. He and Todd co-wrote the screenplay along with their daughter, Ivy Withrow, VP of Development for the company. In House Media Film Partners was born when Todd and Withrow were inspired to create a family production company after Withrow's experiences working with Francis Ford Coppola on five films, starting with The Outsiders.

== Personal life ==
Todd is married to director/producer Glenn Withrow. They have a daughter named Ivy.

== Filmography ==
=== Film ===
| Year | Title | Role | Notes |
|---|---|---|---|
| 1984 | Sam's Son | Cathy Stanton | |
| 1986 | The Check Is in the Mail | Robin Jackson | |
| 2003 | The Lizzie McGuire Movie | Joanne "Jo" McGuire | |
| 2012 | The Mooring | Nancy | |
| 2016 | An American Girl: Lea to the Rescue | Carol Clark | |
| 2020 | The Last Champion | Melinda Miller | |

=== Television ===
| Year | Title | Role | Notes |
|---|---|---|---|
| 1976 | Sara | Emma Higgins | Unknown episodes |
| 1977 | Mary Jane Harper Cried Last Night | Babysitter | Television film |
| 1980 | Family | Marci Murdock | Episode: "Daylight Serenade" |
| 1983 | Who Will Love My Children? | Joann Fray | Television film |
| 1983 | ABC Afterschool Special | Brenda | Episode: "Have You Ever Been Ashamed of Your Parents?" |
| 1983 | The Best of Times | Patti Eubanks | Television pilot |
| 1984–1989 | Brothers | Penny Waters | Main role |
| 1985 | Highway to Heaven | Cindy DeGeralimo | Episode: "Cindy" |
| 1986 | The Golden Girls | Lucy Warren | Episode: "Nice and Easy" |
| 1986 | Growing Pains | The Kid | Episode: "The Kid" |
| 1988 | HeartBeat | Allison | Episode: "To Heal a Doctor" |
| 1989 | Murder, She Wrote | Moira McShane | Episode: "Class Act" |
| 1990–1991 | Murder, She Wrote | Rhoda Markowitz | Recurring role, 6 episodes |
| 1990 | Star Trek: The Next Generation | Lal | Episode: "The Offspring" |
| 1990–1991 | Going Places | Kate Griffin | Main role |
| 1992 | Laurie Hill | Ellen Maddox | Episode: "The Heart Thing" |
| 1992 | Brooklyn Bridge | Miss Chapin | Episode: "In the Still of the Night" |
| 1996 | Murder One | Monica Reese | Episode: "Chapter 18" |
| 1996 | Diagnosis: Murder | Susan Stimpson | Episode: "Left-Handed Murder" |
| 1996–1997 | Life with Roger | Lanie Clark | Main role |
| 1998 | Two of a Kind | Marci | Episode: "Breaking Them Up Is Hard to Do" |
| 1999 | Sabrina, the Teenage Witch | Marigold | Episode: "Sabrina the Matchmaker" |
| 2000 | The Ultimate Christmas Present | Michelle Thompson | Television film |
| 2001–2004 | Lizzie McGuire | Joanne "Jo" McGuire | Main role |
| 2003 | Kim Possible | Summer Gale | Voice role; 2 episodes |
| 2003 | National Lampoon's Thanksgiving Family Reunion | Jill Snider | Television film |
| 2004 | Malcolm in the Middle | Miss Shaw | Episode: "Dirty Magazine" |
| 2005 | Brandy & Mr. Whiskers | Dr. Phyliss | Voice role; episode: "Freaky Tuesday" |

== Books ==
In between her acting roles, Todd wrote two books, Being Young Actors and Parenting The Young Actor.
