= Family Sins =

1987 crime drama made-for-TV film

- advertising poster
- Genre: Drama
- Written by: George Rubino
- Directed by: Jerrold Freedman
- Starring: Jill Eikenberry; James Farentino; Thomas Wilson Brown; Andrew Bednarski; Richard Venture
- Music by: Elizabeth Swados
- Country of origin: United States
- Original language: English

Production
- Executive producer: Jerry London
- Production location: California, United States
- Cinematography: Dennis C. Lewiston
- Running time: 1 hour, 31 minutes
- Production company: London Films

Original release
- Network: LMN; CBS
- Release: 1987

Family Sins is a 1987 American crime drama made-for-television film, starring James Farentino as a father whose troubled son, Bryan, is arrested for voluntary manslaughter after the drowning of his spoiled younger brother, Keith. Accompanied by Jill Eikenberry, Thomas Wilson Brown, Andrew Bednarski and Richard Venture in other character roles, the film was released by London Films and received mixed reviews from critics. It was released on DVD in the early 2000s.

== Plot ==
Gordon Williams and his wife, Kate Williams, are suburban Californian parents with two sons, Bryan and Keith. While Keith is more of a chipper, sporty extrovert who looks up to his father, Bryan is quiet, shy, nerdy, and bookish, leaving him at odds with his father, who openly expresses favouritism towards Keith. Bryan looks up to Gordon as well, but has trouble expressing this; in the absence of his father's love, he finds solace in the praise of a kind-hearted male science teacher who stands up for him after he twists his ankle while playing baseball as the other players taunt him, including Keith, who is on the team. At home after losing the game, Bryan angrily tosses a baseball at Keith, who fails to catch the ball and then tattles on Bryan for "hitting" him. Bryan is punished without question. Keith openly berates Bryan for losing the baseball game and mocks him for failing to fit in with the family.

Bryan offers to take home the class pet, a rabbit, even without parental permission. He confides in Keith despite his better judgment, and the two brothers play with the rabbit while their parents are out at a restaurant. During a lightning storm, the rabbit gets loose, and the brothers frantically search the house, knocking over a decorative lamp and smashing it by mistake. Gordon and Kate are angry upon returning home to find the house in a mess, and when Gordon inevitably discovers the rabbit, Keith declares that Bryan forced him to keep it a secret. Gordon demands that Bryan take the rabbit back to his science teacher, which would be hugely embarrassing for him; he subsequently runs away from home but fails to get very far and returns home, only to discover that his parents have called the police. Gordon does not comfort Bryan, but instead shouts at him, hits him in the face, and offers to help him pack a suitcase so he can live on the street. This causes Kate to stand up for Bryan, calming Gordon down, but Gordon still demands that he get rid of the rabbit. The next day, he returns home from work to find the rabbit slaughtered and buried in a shallow grave in the backyard. While Kate expresses horror that a gentle boy like Bryan would hurt a rabbit, suggesting he needs psychological help, Gordon brushes off the incident as a deliberate act of spite.

Hoping to bring the dysfunctional family together, Gordon and Kate rent a summer cottage on the lake, which bothers Bryan, who is afraid of water after a childhood accident in which he nearly drowned. As a result, Gordon takes Keith out alone on a canoe, and Keith mocks Bryan for his inability to swim. Kate comforts Bryan and tries to convince him that his father still loves him, but has trouble expressing it, which Bryan doubts, pointing out that his father has always been able to express love, pride, and affection for Keith. Later that day, Gordon and Kate drive into town for supplies, leaving the two brothers at the cottage to play. Keith taunts Bryan about his fear of water, and Bryan runs out in the canoe, only for Keith to follow him. Keith mocks Bryan again about how he isn't good at anything, and a mischievous Bryan bets Keith that he can't swim for more than a few minutes straight. Keith tries to prove him wrong by swimming without a lifejacket, but he quickly grows tired and wants help getting back on the boat. As a joke, Bryan reaches his hands out but fails to pull Keith up as he splashes around. He pokes fun at Keith for being scared, unaware that Keith is not as good a swimmer as he has bragged about. When Gordon and Kate return to the cottage, they find that Bryan has rowed back to shore and called the police, and that Keith has drowned on the lake. Gordon sobs hysterically and hugs Keith's corpse, and the parents are made to take Bryan to a local sheriff's station for questioning. Bryan breaks down and admits to letting Keith die, and is kept in juvenile detention as a result. It is advised by Bryan's psychologist that the family partake in counselling, but Gordon refuses, furious with Bryan and concerned about what the neighbours will think when he realizes that Kate is telling people about the incident on the lake. Bryan is kept on house arrest until his court trial, and he tries to asphyxiate himself in the family car, only for Kate to rescue him.

It is decided that Bryan can return home for good only if his family gets the necessary counselling to deal with the incident. During the counselling sessions, Gordon admits to favouriting Keith over Bryan, an act that he now realizes was child abuse, and that his physical and mental treatment of Bryan had been abusive, as well. He also reveals that his own childhood upbringing was unpleasant and cruel, which may have influenced how he raised his two sons. When Bryan is finally allowed to return home, Gordon apologizes to him outside the courthouse for the way he treated him, and, while awkward, this newfound interaction with his father makes Bryan smile.

== Cast ==
- James Farentino as Gordon Williams
- Jill Eikenberry as Kate Williams
- Thomas Wilson Brown as Bryan Williams
- Andrew Bednarski as Keith Williams
- Richard Venture as The Judge
- Brent Spiner as Ken McMahon
- Mimi Kuzyk as Sara Burke
- Tom Bower as The Sheriff
- Michael Durrell as Dr. Hamilton

== Reception ==
Family Sins received mixed reviews from critics, who compared it to the 1980 psychological drama Ordinary People. Don Shirley of L.A. Times had a negative response to the film during its initial 1987 run on CBS, stating, "the only colouring applied to the film is in the self-conscious score by Elizabeth Swados. But these musical attempts to exalt this material into some form of primeval human drama serve only to reinforce the pervasive chilliness of the film, which is also emphasized in cinematographer Denis C. Lewiston’s drained-out images. The performances, directed by Jerrold Freedman, are limited to clenched brows and clouded looks. Critics who complained that Ordinary People was too much like a TV movie might revise their estimation of that film upward after seeing how a real TV movie treats similar material." Steven H. Scheuer, a critic writing for Movies on TV and Video Cassette: 1989-1990, stated that Family Sins was a "sober study of a family in crisis that's more than vaguely reminiscent of The Great Santini and Ordinary People". Bernie Siegel and Holli Kenley included Family Sins as a recommended movie in their 2017 self-help book Recovering the Self: A Journal of Hope and Healing, saying that the dialogue is believable and that the film, while outdated, had a realistic abusive family dynamic.
