= Rehane Abrahams =

South African dramatist

Rehane Abrahams is a performance artist from Cape Town, South Africa. She has performed several works, from Shakespeare to contemporary productions in South Africa and in America. She was a recipient of the FNB Vita Award for Best Actress in 2001. She is a co-founder of The Mothertongue Project, a collective of women artists. She has written and performed a number of plays that have appeared in South Africa, San Francisco and London. She has also appeared in numerous television shows, including SOS on e.tv and as Zelda in Hotnotsgode.

== Performances ==
=== Stagework ===
- Shots in the Dark (Abrahams/McCarthy) Marathon, Black Sun Theatre, Johannesburg S.A.
- Wild South (Wayne Robbins) Topsy, Nico Malan Theatre, Cape Town S.A.
- Wider Than This (Abrahams) Solo Performance, Cafe Bijou, Johannesburg S.A.
- Fresh Wounds (Abrahams/Braham) Brenda, Duke of Cambridge Theatre, London
- Rites Dance Theatre (workshopped)
- The Sacrifice, Arena Theatre, Cape Town S.A
- Macbeth (Shakespeare) Lady Macbeth, Arena Theatre, Cape Town S.A.
- Adam's Apple (Abrahams) Lillith, Monument Theatre, Grahamstown S.A.
- The Crucible (Arthur Miller) Abigail Williams, Little Theatre, Cape Town S.A..
- Venus Goes Vulgar (Abrahams/Hardie) Zerelda, Arena Theatre, Cape Town S.A..
- The Last Trek (Stopford) Holly, Hiddingh Theatre Cape Town S.A.
- Dankie Auntie (Zakes Mda) Pearly Heavens, Umanyano Theatre, Grahamstown S.A.
- House of Bernada Alba (Lorca) Mourner, Arena Theatre, Cape Town S.A.
- High School Musical - Stage version (Stage manager), Bali, ID
- A Midsummer Nights Dream - Director, Arma Museum and Resort, Bali, ID
- Conference of the Birds (Youth Ensemble) - Director, Bali Bird Park and Schools Tour, Bali, ID
- Conference of the Birds - Director, Maya Ubud Resort and Spa, Bali, ID
- Turning the Ear, The Descent of Inanna - Solo Performance, Gaya Fusion Gallery, Bali, ID
- Conference of the Birds - Director, Maya Ubud Resort and Spa, Bali, ID
- The Tempest - Director, Site Specific Tour, Bali, ID
- The UnFolding - Co-Director, Canggu Club, Bali, ID
- Macbeth - Director, Greenschool, Bali, ID
- Womb of Fire (Abrahams) Solo Performance, Baxter Theater, Cape Town S.A.

=== Film and television ===
- The Shattered Mirror (drama) Thelma, Ronny Watt Prod. for C.C.V, South Africa.
- Die Allemans (family drama) Dalene, C films for S.A.B.C. South Africa
- (an act of...) sabotage, German TV film, 1998, Das kleine Fernsehspiel, ZDF.
- Dark Desires: Anna, (TV 1995)

== Featured in ==
- New South African Plays (Aurora Metro Books, 2006)
