= We Bought a Zoo =

2011 film by Cameron Crowe

- Theatrical release poster
- Directed by: Cameron Crowe
- Screenplay by: Aline Brosh McKenna; Cameron Crowe
- Based on: We Bought a Zoo by Benjamin Mee
- Produced by: Julie Yorn; Marc Gordon; Cameron Crowe
- Starring: Matt Damon; Scarlett Johansson; Thomas Haden Church; Patrick Fugit; Elle Fanning; John Michael Higgins
- Cinematography: Rodrigo Prieto
- Edited by: Mark Livolsi
- Music by: Jónsi
- Production companies: Dune Entertainment; Vinyl Films; LBI Entertainment
- Distributed by: 20th Century Fox
- Release dates: December 12, 2011 (Ziegfeld Theatre); December 21, 2011 (United States)
- Running time: 124 minutes
- Country: United States
- Language: English
- Budget: $50 million
- Box office: $120 million

We Bought a Zoo is a 2011 American biographical comedy drama film loosely based on the 2008 memoir of the same name by Benjamin Mee. It was co-written and directed by Cameron Crowe and stars Matt Damon as widowed father Benjamin Mee, who purchases a dilapidated zoo with his family and takes on the challenge of preparing the zoo for its reopening to the public. The film also stars Scarlett Johansson, Maggie Elizabeth Jones, Thomas Haden Church, Patrick Fugit, Elle Fanning, Colin Ford, and John Michael Higgins. The film is based on the Dartmoor Zoological Park, which is a 33-acre zoological garden located near the village of Sparkwell, Devon, England.

We Bought a Zoo was released in the United States on December 21, 2011, by 20th Century Fox. The film grossed $120 million on a $50 million budget and received generally mixed reviews from critics.

== Plot ==
Seven months after the death of his wife Katherine, Benjamin Mee's 14-year-old son Dylan is expelled from school. Benjamin realizes the family could benefit from a fresh start, starting with moving to a new house. Benjamin and his children find none to their liking, until his 7-year-old daughter Rosie sees a listing for a large old estate. Their realtor, Mr. Stevens, tries to dissuade them, explaining that if they want the property, they must also buy a dilapidated zoo on site, which closed several years earlier. After seeing Rosie playing happily with peacocks, Benjamin resolves to buy both the house and the zoo. Dylan, frustrated by the idea of moving away from his friends, retreats into art.

Benjamin's accountant brother, Duncan, tries to discourage him from the purchase, but he is undeterred. The zoo staff, led by head keeper Kelly Foster, start making renovations to reopen the zoo to the public. Meanwhile, Dylan befriends Kelly's 13-year-old homeschooled cousin, Lily, who develops a crush on him. When the zoo's tiger begins experiencing health complications, Benjamin tries to medicate his food, which the tiger refuses to eat. Kelly urges Benjamin to let him go, but Benjamin refuses.

Walter Ferris, a strict USDA inspector, arrives for a surprise visit and gives Benjamin a list of necessary repairs that would cost over $100,000. As Benjamin cannot afford the repairs, the staff's morale decreases, fearing the property will be sold to a buyer that will close it down. When Lily tells Dylan she has heard rumors about his family leaving, Dylan is thrilled, much to her dismay.

Benjamin learns that Katherine bequeathed him an investment account, instructing him to use the money wisely while listening to his heart. Despite Dylan's protests, Benjamin decides to use the money to repair the zoo, leading to a heated argument between him and Dylan. The next morning, a remorseful Dylan admits he misses Lily, and Benjamin realizes that instead of trying to start over by forgetting Katherine, he should accept that she will always be a part of him. Following his father's advice, Dylan confesses his feelings to Lily, who forgives him. Prior to the zoo's grand opening, the facility passes a stringent inspection by Ferris, who grudgingly wishes them good luck. They learn that a severe rainstorm is approaching. Fortunately, the weather clears on the day of the opening, but they are disappointed when it appears that no one is visiting.

Dylan discovers that a fallen tree has blocked the access road; a large crowd of visitors is waiting behind it. The staff help everyone climb over the tree, leading to attendance so high that they run out of tickets. When Benjamin and Kelly go to retrieve more tickets from the shed, Kelly admits that she has feelings for Benjamin, and they kiss. Benjamin later takes Dylan and Rosie to the restaurant where he met Katherine and visualizes her sitting in front of him as he tells them the story of how he found the confidence to approach her table.

== Cast ==
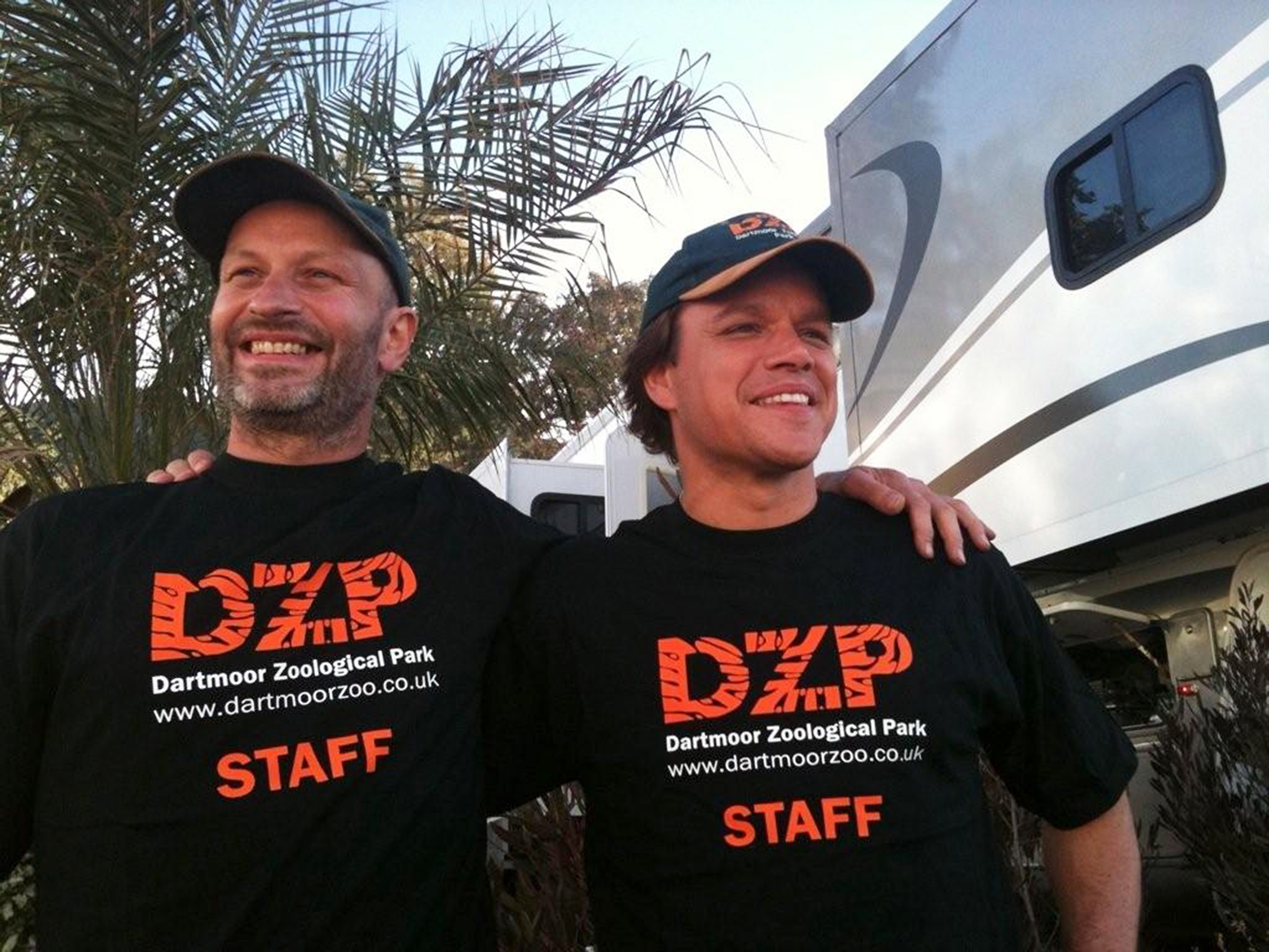
Matt Damon (right) on the film set with Benjamin Mee of Dartmoor Zoo (left), the inspiration for the film

- Matt Damon as Benjamin Mee, the father of Dylan and Rosie Mee, the owner of the zoo and the love interest of Kelly Foster, who is trying to restart his life after the death of his first wife, Katherine.
- Scarlett Johansson as Kelly Foster, the 28-year-old lead long-time zookeeper at Rosemoor Animal Park who is Benjamin's love interest and is a mother figure to Dylan and Rosie.
- Thomas Haden Church as Duncan Mee, Benjamin's older brother, and Dylan and Rosie's uncle, who works as an accountant.
- Colin Ford as Dylan Mee, Benjamin's 14-year-old son, who is initially drawn to Lily and eventually develops feelings for her. Throughout the film he has a strained and rough relationship with his father.
- Maggie Elizabeth Jones as Rosie Mee, Benjamin's 7-year-old daughter and Dylan's younger sister, who is very curious about all of the animals in the zoo and thinks living at a zoo is a grand adventure.
- Elle Fanning as Lily Miska, the 13-year old home-schooled cousin of Kelly and worker at the zoo's restaurant who lives within the zoo. Although she is too young to legally work, she is paid "under the table" out of her cousin's salary. She develops a crush on Dylan, who is at first unaware of this fact.
- Patrick Fugit as Robin Jones, the zoo's craftsman and owner of Crystal the Monkey.
- John Michael Higgins as Walter "Walt" Ferris, a strict zoo inspector who earns the dislike of many people, especially Peter MacCreedy.
- Angus Macfadyen as Peter MacCreedy, the carpenter of the zoo who had made many innovative enclosures for the zoo, and he claims that his ideas were "stolen" by Walter Ferris. Because of this, he has a huge and violent grudge against Walter.
- Carla Gallo as Rhonda Blair, the secretary and bookkeeper of the zoo.
- J. B. Smoove as Mr. Stevens, the Mee family's real estate agent.
- Stéphanie Szostak as Katherine Mee, Benjamin's late wife, and Dylan and Rosie's late mother.
- Desi Lydic as Shea Seger, a woman with an obvious crush on Benjamin who always brings him lasagna.
- Peter Riegert as Delbert McGinty, Benjamin's boss before he 'starts over'.
- Michael Panes as the principal of Dylan and Rosie's school.
- Dustin Ybarra as Nathan
- Kym Whitley as Eve the Home Depot Clerk.
- Crystal the Monkey as herself.
- Bart / Tank the Bear as Buster, a grizzly bear.
- Taylor Cerza as Zoo Patron (credited as Taylor Victoria)

The real Benjamin Mee and his children have cameo appearances.

== Production ==
The zoo scenes were filmed at Greenfield Ranch in Hidden Valley, Thousand Oaks, California, where a zoo was erected for the filming.

=== Development ===
In May 2010, Cameron Crowe agreed to direct the 20th Century Fox adaptation of Benjamin Mee's memoir We Bought a Zoo. He then began rewriting the film's script, which was originally written by Aline Brosh McKenna. This was the first narrative film that was directed by Crowe since the 2005 film Elizabethtown. The film was released on December 21, 2011.

=== Casting ===
Crowe traveled to the set of the film True Grit to persuade actor Matt Damon to take on the role of the lead character in the film. Crowe also presented a script of the film, a CD of songs that Crowe burned himself of live versions of classic songs, and a copy of the 1983 film Local Hero, with instructions "to not just read the script and make a decision". Damon was persuaded to play the role after he was moved by the music and found that Local Hero was a "masterpiece". As for Crowe himself, he had already decided on Damon halfway through their meeting, though the distributor Fox still had a shortlist of candidates to play this role.

== Soundtrack ==
In August 2011, it was announced that Icelandic musician Jón Þór "Jónsi" Birgisson, the lead singer and guitarist of the band Sigur Rós, would be composing the music scores for We Bought a Zoo. Director Crowe described the choice as "only natural", since "Jónsi has been a part of the making of We Bought A Zoo from the very beginning".

The song Gathering Stories was on the shortlist of 39 songs that had a chance of being nominated for Best Original Song Oscar at the 84th Academy Awards. This song was co-written by Jonsi Birgisson and Cameron Crowe.

While the official CD release of the movie soundtrack only includes music by Jón Þór "Jónsi" Birgisson and Sigur Rós, the complete soundtrack of the film included a variety of artists.

== Reception ==
=== Box office ===
We Bought a Zoo grossed a total of $2,984,875 on its opening day in the U.S. box office, making it the sixth highest-grossing film that weekend. It subsequently earned $14,604,645 in its first four days of screening. Overall, the film grossed $75,624,550 in North America and $37,764,426 internationally for a worldwide total of $113,388,976. It is one of only twelve feature films to be released in over 3,000 theaters and still improve on its box office performance in its second weekend, increasing 41.4% from $9,360,434 to $13,238,241.

=== Critical response ===
On review aggregator website Rotten Tomatoes, the film has an approval rating of 64% based on 171 reviews. The website's critical consensus reads, "We Bought a Zoo is a transparently cloying effort by director Cameron Crowe, but Matt Damon makes for a sympathetic central character." On Metacritic, the film has a score of 58 out of 100, based on 41 critics, indicating "mixed or average reviews". Audiences polled by CinemaScore gave the film an average grade of "A" on an A+ to F scale.

Roger Ebert, reviewing for the Chicago Sun-Times, awarded the film two and a half out of four stars, describing the film as "too much formula and not enough human interest". He added that the film's "pieces go together too easily, the plot is too inevitable, and we feel little real energy between the players". However, he praised Damon, who he said "makes a sturdy and likable Benjamin Mee". The New York Times reviewer Manohla Dargis criticized Crowe's direction, writing that it "makes the escalating tension between Benjamin and Dylan the story's soft center," while keeping "the brutality of illness and death... safely off-screen". She also noted that the film uses "classic movie logic", specifically pointing out the way that Benjamin quits his job and that he "doesn't agonize about how he'll keep his children housed, fed and clothed". On the other hand, Dargis wrote that "you may not buy his [Cameron's] happy endings, but it's a seductive ideal when all of God's creatures, great and small, buxom and blond, exist in such harmony.""

The Hollywood Reporter commented that the film "has heart, humanity and a warmly empathetic central performance from Matt Damon", although it "doesn't dodge the potholes of earnest sentimentality and at times overplays the whimsy"; ultimately concluding that "Cameron Crowe's film has some rough edges, but it ultimately delivers thanks to Matt Damon's moving performance.""

=== Home media ===
20th Century Fox Home Entertainment released We Bought a Zoo on DVD and Blu-ray on April 3, 2012.

=== Accolades ===
List of awards and nominations
Year	Award	Category	Recipient(s) and nominee(s)	Result	Ref
2011	Phoenix Film Critics Society Awards	Best Live Action Family Film	We Bought a Zoo	Nominated	
2011	Satellite Award	Best Original Song	Jónsi, Cameron Crowe – "Gathering Stories"	Nominated	
2012	BMI Award	Film Music Award	Jónsi	Won	
2012	Teen Choice Awards	Choice Movie: Drama	We Bought a Zoo	Nominated	
2012	Teen Choice Awards	Choice Movie Actor: Drama	Matt Damon	Nominated	
2012	Teen Choice Awards	Choice Movie Actress: Drama	Scarlett Johansson	Nominated	
2012	Young Artist Award	Best Performance in a Feature Film - Supporting Young Actor	Colin Ford	Nominated	
2012	Young Artist Award	Best Performance in a Feature Film - Young Actress Ten and Under	Maggie Elizabeth Jones	Nominated	

== Differences between the movie and real life ==
The film's plot and actual events differ. The real Benjamin Mee is British, whereas in the film he is American. The story was adapted for an American audience and Mee approved the changes. The actual zoo Mee bought is Dartmoor Zoological Park, located in Devon, England. The fictional zoo in the film is called Rosemoor Wildlife Park and is located in California, US.

In real life, Benjamin's wife, Katherine, died after they had bought the zoo and moved in. In the film, Benjamin bought the zoo after her death. In real life, Benjamin's father had died and his mother needed to move; the farm cost the same price as his parents' house, and his mother came too. Benjamin and his family made a specific and informed decision to buy a zoo: in the film, it occurred as a result of finding a house they liked.

Instead of an escaping grizzly bear, as portrayed by the film, it was a jaguar called Sovereign that had escaped. Benjamin's children were also younger (aged four and six respectively) than the children in the film.

In the film, the zoo was much easier to buy. In real life, it took almost two years to buy. Benjamin's first offer to buy the zoo was rejected due to his lack of experience in the zoological world. Finally, the real zoo opened on Saturday July 7, 2007. The film moved that event to the same date in 2010. This later date fell on a Wednesday, but was identified in the script as the original Saturday.

== Legacy ==
The longtime gag-feud between Matt Damon and Oscars host Jimmy Kimmel continued at the 89th Academy Awards ceremony, where Kimmel jokingly mocked Damon's performance in the movie.
