= Maggie Elizabeth Jones =

American actress

- Born: October 10, 2003 (age 22); Atlanta, Georgia, United States
- Occupation: Actress
- Years active: 2010–2016

External image
- Maggie Elizabeth Jones IMDb photo

Maggie Elizabeth Jones is an American retired child actress, best known for her roles in We Bought a Zoo, the Fox sitcom Ben and Kate, and as Lea Clark in An American Girl: Lea to the Rescue.

== Personal life ==
Jones attended Landmark Christian School, a private school in Fairburn, Georgia, and graduated in May 2022. She ran for the varsity cross country team during her time there. She is currently attending Auburn University, where she is also a member of the Zeta Tau Alpha sorority.

== Filmography ==
Film
Year	Title	Role	Notes
2010	Most Likely to Succeed	Mia	Television film
2010	The Party	Hannah Reece	Short film
2011	Test Subject B	Bethany - age 5	Short film
2011	Game Time: Tackling the Past	Shayla Walker	Television film
2011	Footloose	Amy Warnicker	Feature film
2011	We Bought a Zoo	Rosie Mee	Feature film
2012	The First Time	Stella Hodgman	Feature film
2013	Identity Thief	Jessie Patterson	Feature film
2014	Child of Grace	Katie Johnson	Television film
2015	Away & Back	Frankie Peterson	Television film
2016	An American Girl: Lea to the Rescue	Lea Clark	Direct to video

Television
Year	Title	Role	class
2012–13	Ben and Kate	Maddie Fox	Series regular
2014	Star-Crossed	Young Emery Whitehill	One episode
2014	Halt and Catch Fire	Joanie Clark	One episode

Video Games
Year	Title	Role	Notes
2016	King's Quest - Chapter III: Once Upon A Climb	Gwendolyn	
