= We Bought a Zoo (book) =

2008 book by Benjamin Mee

- Author: Benjamin Mee
- Language: English
- Publisher: HarperCollins
- Publication date: 2008

We Bought a Zoo is a book published in 2008 by Benjamin Mee about his experiences in purchasing the Dartmoor Wildlife Park in Devon, England in 2006. Renamed the Dartmoor Zoological Park, it was reopened to the public the following year.

The book was loosely adapted into a film of the same name that was released in 2011.

The book was published by HarperCollins (ISBN 978-0007274864).
