= Briga Heelan =

American actress and comedian

- Born: Andover, Massachusetts, U.S.
- Education: University of Southern California
- Occupations: Actress, comedian
- Years active: 2009–present
- Spouse: Rene Gube (m. 2015)
- Children: 2

Briga Heelan (pronunciation /ˈbriːɡɑː/ BREE-gah) is an American actress and comedian. She is known for her work on the sitcoms Cougar Town, Ground Floor, Undateable, Love, Great News, and B Positive.

== Early life and education ==
Heelan was born in Andover, Massachusetts, the daughter of actress and Lowell Public Schools teacher Kimball Heelan and playwright Kevin Heelan. She has a brother named Conor. Heelan's father, as well as being a dramatist, has been a faculty member at Phillips Andover Academy since 1983.

Heelan attended Walnut Hill School for the Arts and studied for a year at the Cincinnati Conservatory of Music, before transferring to the University of Southern California. She graduated with a Bachelor of Arts degree in 2009. At graduation, Heelan received the James B. Pendleton Award for outstanding contributions to the USC School of Dramatic Arts.

== Career ==
Heelan intended to focus on musical theatre. She met her Ground Floor co-star, Skylar Astin, at a musical theatre convention.

Heelan's break-out TV role was on Cougar Town. She was credited as a recurring character on Undateable, appearing in three episodes plus the pilot. She was able to shoot both Bill Lawrence-helmed Ground Floor and Undateable simultaneously because both comedies are multi-camera, which require fewer production days than single-camera shows. She also guest starred in the first episode of Season 10 of Curb Your Enthusiasm.

Regarding Heelan's role in Ground Floor, TV critic Alan Sepinwall said Heelan is "simply terrific as Jenny: warm and quirky while always feeling like a strong and independent character". The Los Angeles Times said Heelan "makes Ground Floor watchable", describing her as "remarkably alive and in the moment; she makes real all that she touches. I could easily recommend tuning in just to watch her work – and hereby do."

On May 13, 2023, Heelan made her Broadway debut as Cinderella in Once Upon a One More Time at the Marquis Theatre. She had previously portrayed the same role in the 2021 world premiere run in Washington, D.C.

== Personal life ==
On her unusual name, she said, "It's an Irish name. In fact, my last name was O'Heelahan back in the day. And Briga, I read somewhere, is some pagan Celtic goddess, which sounds great, so I really like saying that. But I was named after my grandmother's best friend, who was Irish and came from Dublin."

On October 16, 2014, Heelan became engaged to her Ground Floor co-star Rene Gube. They were married on May 8, 2015. On October 31, 2016, they announced they were expecting their first child, a daughter, due in March 2017. Heelan gave birth to their daughter Bennet Alejandra Gube on March 23, 2017. On June 24, 2024, Heelan announced they were expecting their second child. Heelan gave birth to their second daughter, Lily Lourdes Gube, on November 25th, 2024.

== Filmography ==
Year	Title	Role	Notes
2011	Man Up!	Money	Episode: "Disciplining the Keens"
2012	Jane by Design	Amanda Clark	5 episodes
2012	Cougar Town	Holly	7 episodes
2013	Happy Endings	Ryan	Episode: "The Ex Factor"
2013–2015	Ground Floor	Jenny Miller	Main role (20 episodes)
2014–2015	Undateable	Nicki	7 episodes
2015	Truth Be Told	Katherine/Kiki	Episode: "Guess Who's Coming to Decorate"
2016	Crazy Ex-Girlfriend	Connie Cavanaugh	Episode: "That Text Was Not Meant for Josh!"
2016–2017	Love	Heidi	6 episodes
2017–2018	Great News	Katie Wendelson	Lead role
2019	Brooklyn Nine-Nine	Keri Brennan	Episode: "He Said, She Said"
2019	Modern Family	Linda	Episode: "Stand by Your Man"
2020	Curb Your Enthusiasm	Valerie Ashburn	Episode: "Happy New Year"
2020–2021	B Positive	Samantha Turner	Recurring; 14 episodes
2022	Bob Hearts Abishola	Marion Mitchell	Episode: "Compress to Impress"
2023	So Help Me Todd	Amy	Episode: "12 Worried Persons"
