= Undateable =

American television sitcom (2014–2016)

- Also known as: Undateable Live
- Genre: Sitcom
- Created by: Adam Sztykiel
- Based on: Undateable by: Ellen Rakieten; Anne Coyle
- Directed by: Phill Lewis (mostly season 2 and 3); Various (season 1)
- Starring: Chris D'Elia; Brent Morin; Bianca Kajlich; David Fynn; Rick Glassman; Ron Funches; Bridgit Mendler
- Country of origin: United States
- Original language: English
- No. of seasons: 3
- No. of episodes: 36 (list of episodes)

Production
- Executive producers: Adam Sztykiel; Bill Lawrence; Jeff Ingold
- Camera setup: Multi-camera
- Running time: 21–23 minutes
- Production companies: Doozer; Warner Bros. Television

Original release
- Network: NBC
- Release: May 29, 2014 – January 29, 2016

Undateable is an American sitcom television series that aired on NBC from May 29, 2014, to January 29, 2016, and originally premiered as a mid-season replacement. The series was created by Adam Sztykiel, based on the book Undateable: 311 Things Guys Do That Guarantee They Won't Be Dating or Having Sex by Ellen Rakieten and Anne Coyle. In the show, bachelor Danny Burton has trouble getting into a relationship with various women he meets. On May 8, 2015, NBC renewed Undateable for a third season that consisted entirely of live episodes, which premiered on October 9, 2015. On May 13, 2016, NBC canceled the series after three seasons.

== Premise ==
Danny Burton is a 34-year-old carefree single guy who has watched most of his friends move on to serious relationships. When his last remaining single friend, Shannon, moves out to marry, Danny searches for a new roommate. A promising candidate is Justin, the owner of Black Eyes Bar (frequently mispronounced "Black Guys Bar") in the Detroit suburb of Ferndale. Justin and his friends—the creepy Burski, oddball Shelly, and recently out-of-the-closet Brett—all have certain qualities that make them appear "undateable". While Danny himself has good luck getting women into bed, he is unable or unwilling to form a lasting commitment with any of them. Danny's older sister, Leslie, has similar fears about being undateable, having the "baggage" of being a mid-30s divorcee.

Season	Episodes	Originally released	
Season	Episodes	First released	Last released
1	13	May 29, 2014	July 3, 2014
2	10	March 17, 2015	May 12, 2015
3	13	October 9, 2015	January 29, 2016

== Cast ==
=== Main ===
- Chris D'Elia as Danny Burton, a womanizer
- Brent Morin as Justin Kearney, Danny's roommate who is a bar owner and is awkward with women
- Bianca Kajlich as Leslie Burton, Danny's recently divorced and alcoholic older sister
- David Fynn as Brett, Justin's gay co-worker and friend
- Rick Glassman as Adam Burski, Justin's nerdy friend who has a crush on Leslie and often goes by his surname
- Ron Funches as Shelly, Justin's oddball friend who moves into the upstairs loft at the bar
- Bridgit Mendler as Candace (Season 2–3), Justin's eccentric new bartender and later fiancée; she often scares the gang with bizarre stories from her childhood, living in cars and eating paper – but always delivers these tales with a strange optimism

=== Recurring ===
- Briga Heelan as Nicki, Justin's bartender, and later, ex-girlfriend (Season 1; guest in Season 2)
- Eva Amurri as Sabrina, Danny's ex-girlfriend and Justin's new employee (Season 1)
- Adam Hagenbuch as Trent, Candace's ex-boyfriend who wants her back, making him Justin's rival (Season 2–3)
- Whitney Cummings as Charlotte, Justin's friend from school whom he sets up with Danny (Season 3)

=== Guest ===
- Tom Cavanagh as Frank, Justin's father
- Josh Hopkins as Julius, Leslie's ex-husband
- Ed Sheeran as himself
- Victoria Justice as Amanda
- Rene Gube as Parker, Nicki's new boyfriend
- Zach Braff as Zach, Shelly's co-worker
- Donald Faison as Donald, Shelly's co-worker
- Christa Miller as Allie (Season 2), a customer
  - Miller also plays Jackie (Season 3), the woman to whom Danny lost his virginity
- Minnie Driver as Minnie, Allie's friend
- Rory Scovel as Kevin, Justin's and Danny's annoying neighbor
- Neil Flynn as Neil, a customer
- Drew Pinsky as himself
- Mike Catherwood as Mike, a customer who later becomes Leslie's boyfriend
- Kate Walsh as Kate, Allie's friend
- Scott Foley as "TV's Scott Foley", an exaggerated version of himself
- Sarah Chalke as herself
- Meghan Trainor as Meghan, a customer
- Robert Maschio as Todd

== Production ==
=== Development and casting ===
NBC purchased the script from Bill Lawrence in October 2012. Casting for the pilot began in early 2013, with Brent Morin and Rick Glassman being cast in February and Bianca Kajlich and Chris D'Elia being cast in March. Matthew Wilkas was also cast in March as Brett, Justin's gay friend. Aly Michalka was originally cast as Maddie, a waitress in Justin's bar and Justin's love interest, but she left the show in April 2013 and was replaced with Briga Heelan in a guest star role as the similar character Nicki.

=== Filming ===
In May 2013, NBC placed a series order for Undateable. After the series was ordered, Wilkas left and was replaced with David Fynn in the role of Brett. When both Undateable and Ground Floor, which stars Heelan, were picked up as series, Megan Park was cast to replace Heelan in the Nicki role. However, by September of that year, the producers were able to arrange the schedules of the two shows so that Heelan could appear on Undateable as Nicki on a recurring basis, and she replaced Park.

In March 2014, Lawrence, Morin, Glassman, Funches, and D'Elia launched an 8-city comedy tour to promote the show.

On May 5, 2015, the show was presented live in a one-hour episode that featured numerous guest stars. Based on the reception to that episode, NBC made the decision to feature all live episodes for Season 3, with each episode featuring a musical guest. Starting with season 3, Undateable aired two feeds, one from the East Coast and one from the West Coast, both of which were available online after the show aired on its linear broadcast.

On November 13, 2015, 30 minutes before air time, a decision was made to pre-empt the then-upcoming live program due to the November 2015 Paris attacks. The next week, during the November 20 live episode, references were made about the attack.

== The Sixth Lead ==
The Sixth Lead is a five-part webseries starring Rick Glassman. Each part runs for 4–7 minutes. It is described as "A web-series about an NBC Sitcom actor who doesn't really talk much." It is about Glassman wanting to contribute more to Undateable and become a more important cast member on the series. The first episode is titled "Meeting With the Showrunner".

== Reception ==
=== Critical response ===
Undateable initially received mixed reviews from critics. On Rotten Tomatoes, the first season holds a 38% rating, based on 16 reviews, with the consensus reading: "Largely bereft of originality or humor, Undateable is underwhelming." On Metacritic, the first season has a score of 49 out of 100 based on 19 critics, indicating "mixed or average reviews".

The third season finale "averaged a 0.8/3 in 18–49 and 2.7 million viewers overall, placing fourth among the Big Four but matching the show's top score since mid-October." Due to the success of the Season 2 finale going live, the decision was made to renew Undateable for an all-live Season 3, broadcasting live for both the East and West Coast feeds.

=== Ratings ===
Viewership and ratings per season of Undateable
Season	Timeslot (ET)	Episodes	First aired		Last aired		TV season	Viewership rank	Avg. viewers (millions)
Season	Timeslot (ET)	Episodes	Date	Viewers (millions)	Date	Viewers (millions)	TV season	Viewership rank	Avg. viewers (millions)
1	Thursday 9:00 p.m.	13	May 29, 2014	3.84	July 3, 2014	1.99	2013–14	N/A	2.78
2	Tuesday 9:00 p.m.	10	March 17, 2015	6.43	May 12, 2015	4.01	2014–15	109	5.11
3	Friday 8:00 p.m.	13	October 9, 2015	2.54	January 29, 2016	2.73	2015–16	133	3.23

== Awards and nominations ==
Year	Award	Category	Nominee(s)	Result	Ref
2015	Art Directors Award	Multi-Camera Television Series	Undateable – Episode: "Pilot"	Nominated	
2015	Art Directors Award	Episode of a Multi-Camera, Variety or Unscripted Series	Cabot McMullen (production designer), Jeffrey Beck (set designer), Susan Bolles (graphic designer), Amber Haley (set decorator)	Nominated	
