= So Help Me Todd =

2022 American legal dramedy television series

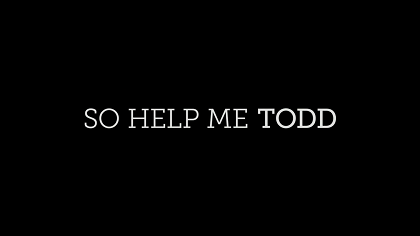
- Genre: Legal drama; Comedy drama
- Created by: Scott Prendergast
- Showrunners: Scott Prendergast; Elizabeth J.B. Klaviter
- Starring: Marcia Gay Harden; Skylar Astin; Madeline Wise; Tristen J. Winger; Inga Schlingmann; Rosa Evangelina Arredondo
- Music by: Jeff Russo; Sam Lucas
- Country of origin: United States
- Original language: English
- No. of seasons: 2
- No. of episodes: 31

Production
- Executive producers: Michael Spiller; Phillip C. McGraw; Jay McGraw; Julia Eisenman; Scott Prendergast; Elizabeth J.B. Klaviter; Amy York Rubin; Craig Shapiro; Liz Kruger; Stuart Gillard
- Producers: JoAnne McCool; Marcia Gay Harden; Skylar Astin; S. Lily Hui; Wayne Bennett; Lisa Towers
- Production locations: Vancouver, British Columbia, Canada
- Cinematography: Eric Tremi; Stephen Jackson
- Editors: Christian Kinnard; Jean-Nicolas Rivat; Joe Mitacek; Eric Lea; Susan Mandel; Gina Hirsch
- Running time: 43 minutes
- Production companies: Stage 29 Productions; The Elizabeth Diaries; CBS Studios; Belicious

Original release
- Network: CBS
- Release: September 29, 2022 – May 16, 2024

So Help Me Todd is an American legal comedy-drama television series, created by Scott Prendergast, that premiered on September 29, 2022, on CBS. The series follows a talented but directionless private investigator, who begrudgingly agrees to work at his overbearing mother's law firm. It stars Marcia Gay Harden, Skylar Astin, Madeline Wise, Tristen J. Winger, Inga Schlingmann, and Rosa Evangelina Arredondo. In February 2023, the series was renewed for a second season, which premiered on February 15, 2024. In April 2024, the series was canceled after two seasons. The final episode aired with a cliffhanger on May 16, 2024.

== Premise ==
So Help Me Todd follows Todd, who has good instincts as a private investigator, but lacks direction and is the black sheep of his family. After his strong-willed mother, Margaret, negotiated to drop criminal charges against Todd two years previously, he reluctantly agrees to work at her Portland, Oregon law firm as an in-house investigator. Margaret believes in strictly adhering to the law, which is at complete odds with Todd's tendency to bend the law to navigate sticky situations.

== Cast ==
=== Main ===
- Marcia Gay Harden as Margaret Wright, a defense attorney who completed her Juris Doctor degree after the death of her first husband
- Skylar Astin as Todd, Margaret's youngest child, a former private detective hired by Margaret's firm
- Madeline Wise as Allison, Todd's sister, an ER doctor
- Tristen J. Winger as Lyle, a fastidious in-house investigator at Margaret's firm
- Inga Schlingmann as Susan, Todd's engaged ex-girlfriend, a lawyer at Margaret's firm
- Rosa Evangelina Arredondo as Francey, Margaret's executive assistant

=== Recurring ===
- Mark Moses as Harry, Margaret's estranged husband and later ex-husband
- Jeffrey Nordling as Gus Easton, a fellow attorney and a potential love interest for Margaret
- Rob LaBelle as Lars Boatman
- Matthew Wilkas as Lawrence, Margaret's eldest child
- Leslie Silva as Beverly Crest, a partner at the law firm where Margaret works
- Clayton James as Chuck Grant, Allison's ex-husband
- Vinessa Antoine as Alex, Lyle's love interest, who is later revealed to be an undercover FBI investigator named Ariel
- Heather Morris as Judy Maxon (season 2), Todd's love interest who works at a gift shop in the same office building where Todd and Margaret work

In addition, Thomas Cadrot co-stars as Chet Venables, a reporter married to Margaret's son Lawrence.

=== Notable guest stars ===
- Briga Heelan as Amy
- Lisa Rinna as Jennifer Gianola (season 2)
- Sandra Bernhard as Belinda Tuttle (season 2)
- Dean Winters as Dick Franks (season 2)
- Jenifer Lewis as Jacqueline (season 2), Lyle's mother

== Episodes ==
=== Series overview ===
Season	Episodes	Originally released	
Season	Episodes	First released	Last released
1	21	September 29, 2022	May 18, 2023
2	10	February 15, 2024	May 16, 2024

=== Season 1 (2022–23) ===
No. overall	No. in season	Title	Directed by	Written by	Original release date	U.S. viewers (millions)
1	1	"Pilot"	Amy York Rubin	Scott Prendergast	September 29, 2022	4.82
Todd, a former private investigator working to catch insurance fraud, has hit rock bottom - living in his sister's garage and owing his successful lawyer mother, Margaret, $9000 in return for her ensuring he didn't spend any jail time after his former PI partner, Veronica, set him up to be the fall guy for all the criminal activity she'd been doing. However, after Margaret's second husband Harry disappears from their house, she asks Todd to track him down. Meanwhile, Margaret is defending a young woman accused of shooting a man in a parking garage. In the end, Todd finds Harry on a plane to Iceland, not wanting to spend the next 7-10 years with Parkinson's disease (recently diagnosed) under the controlling Margaret's thumb. Due to Todd's good work in leading Margaret to the real killer, she gets him hired as an investigator at her law firm where the previous one has just gone on maternity leave.
2	2	"Co-Pilot"	Michael Spiller	Scott Prendergast	October 6, 2022	4.41
Margaret believes that she is going to defend the mayor against a sexual misconduct allegation, but partner Alistair Song asserts his position and takes the case from her due to its high profile nature. Things escalate as the accuser is found dead hours after appearing in court. Todd is initially assigned to audit a case regarding water damage to antique dolls, but he ducks out due to the boring nature of the case to pursue information after the murder, happening to discover the body. The mayor's wife is accused of committing the murder, but after some investigating, it was found a former teacher (and lover) of the wife actually committed the murder.
3	3	"Second Second Chance"	Robert Duncan McNeill	Lisa Kyonga Parsons	October 13, 2022	4.49
A former friend of Todd's, Brian, hires Margaret to defend him against a trespassing charge, only to be the suspect of robbing a pawn shop the very next day after the charges were dropped. The evidence was strongly against him until learning that Brian's father had recently been released from prison, and coerced his nephew to aid in robbing the pawn shop and framing Brian for all of it. Margaret is insecure about Harry running off and what her socialite friends would think until she decides to have Todd dig up dirt on them and reveal it on a group call.
4	4	"Corduroy Briefs"	Nancy Hower	Elizabeth J.B. Klaviter & Nicole French	October 20, 2022	4.30
Margaret is defending a former Olympian athlete turned leg amputee in a class action lawsuit against a large airline company, Northbrook. The opposing lawyer, Gus Easton, seems like a bumbling lawyer (originally from Seattle), but he gives a very good fight against the lawsuit. A mechanic is tracked down who knew there was a flaw in the plane's design, but gets shaken down by a fixer. Eventually, the information is found through various codes she left and luck that she managed to make it to trial on time.
5	5	"Let the Wright One In"	Keith Powell	Andy Berman	October 27, 2022	4.62
Margaret attempts to join a prestigious Portland society group, but defends a young worker there after she accidentally broke an antique teacup and got yelled at by the chairwoman. Not long afterwards, that same worker was arrested for having lots of drugs strapped to the bottom of her car. She had no knowledge of the drugs, with the only abnormal link being that she drove to Canada to buy special soaps made there.
6	6	"So Help Me Pod"	Randy Zisk	April Fitzsimmons	November 3, 2022	3.93
A podcaster, Lea Luna, is aiding Margaret regarding a case from 15 years ago where an immigrant woman was found guilty of killing a neighbor. Todd has great chemistry with Lea, and the two start to flirt a little as they reinvestigate the case. The new tenant in that apartment also mysteriously dies, having been pushed over the railing. Todd and Lea get locked in the basement overnight with the boiler raging, in an attempt to kill them both. It seems a neighbor, an accomplished writer, actually stole the story from the original victim and changed her name to avoid association with her formerly horrible books. Lea is going to Portland, Maine for her next True Crime podcast, but leaves Todd with a set of lockpicks as a memento.
7	7	"Long Lost Lawrence"	Daniella Eisman	Scott Prendergast & Stefanie Woodburn	November 10, 2022	4.37
Nearly all of Margaret's family is leaving the city for Thanksgiving - except for Todd - so she decides to throw herself into her work and takes over a worker's comp case from Susan. The victim in the case, Chloe, acts a bit bizarrely while her parents seem overly invested in getting compensation. After Chloe reaches out to Todd, claiming to have robbed the bank herself, it is revealed that the bank robbery is similar to one from 65 years earlier, and that Chloe and her brother had been put into conservatorships as teenagers, set up to make it look like the children are the guilty parties instead of the parents. Todd reaches out to his older brother, Lawrence, who also works for the governor, initially to get him to come home for Thanksgiving, and then later to get the governor to sign a bill to make it easier for Chloe and her brother to break their conservatorship. In the end, all of Margaret's children are home for Thanksgiving while their families Facetime in from their respective houses.
8	8	"Big Bang Theories"	Nancy Hower	Ira Madison III	December 8, 2022	4.48
Lyle's niece gets accused of setting off a bomb at a chemical company, being the only one seen on camera going into the building shortly before the explosion and a member of a protest group. The explosion injured and eventually killed one of the scientists working there. Turns out the scientist's research partner planted the bomb because they had found a way to fight against plastic pollution but the victim wanted to benevolently give it away instead of profiting off it, so he used his twin brother to establish an alibi.
9	9	"Swipe Wright"	Michael Spiller	Jamie Pachino	December 15, 2022	4.70
Allison leaves on vacation with her husband and asks Todd not to enter the house. Margaret defends a company, PDTronix, against a terminated coder who claims to have invented a revolutionary new dating app. In investigating the dating app, Margaret finds Gus Easton, who also happens to be representing the plaintiff, and a "Claire" who looks like she might possibly be Alison. Margaret learns that Mason, the PR rep for PDTronix stole the code from the coder's home computer, but has to carefully implicate him while not being guilty of malpractice for improperly defending her client.
10	10	"The Devil You Know"	Kabir Akhtar	Lisa Kyonga Parsons	January 5, 2023	4.80
In investigating a murder of a journalist, Todd reaches out to his old partner Veronica who is serving time in the women's penitentiary, as is the leader of a biker gang, the Portland Ghosts. Instead, Veronica points Todd into investigating the lead detective, Luke Anten, as someone who has a pattern of claiming a C.I. tipped him off to a suspect, so that he doesn't have to reveal his source and he can frame innocent parties. Todd seems to fall back into old habits with Veronica, but eventually decides to tell her one last time that he's cutting all ties with her. Unbeknownst to Todd and Margaret, Veronica is released on parole for her part in aiding on the Luke Anten case.
11	11	"Side Effects May Include Murder"	Daniel Willis	Andy Berman	January 12, 2023	4.90
A teacher stabs her principal during a birthday party, but has no memory of the incident happening. Reviewing footage of the party, she seems to be in a daze for a large part of the party before the incident occurs. This is linked to a side-effect of a drug she'd been taking, but wasn't revealed to the public or the FDA despite showing up in drug trials.
12	12	"Psilo-Sibling"	Ali LeRoi	April Fitzsimmons & Nicole French	February 2, 2023	5.16
The governor asks Margaret to help her sister evict a man from her property after he is seemingly causing trouble. The sister, who was a former drug addict but is seemingly clean since inheriting the farm, claims to be terrorized by weird lights and sounds at night, and dead squirrels in her home. Eventually, her farm is set on fire and she is arrested for drug possession. A neighboring farm couple was behind the whole thing, using a drone and poison because they had trouble growing hallucinogenic mushrooms on their own property.
13	13	"Wall of Fire"	Wendey Stanzler	Scott Prendergast	February 9, 2023	5.30
The law firm erects an internal firewall as Susan's fiancé, Peter, is suing the City of Portland, which Margaret had just agreed to represent as a favor to Gus. Todd is forced to join "Team Susan" as he agreed to help Peter track down a missing employee who was responsible for doing the soil sample tests of the building sites in the location central to the lawsuit. Both cases unite as the culprit in them both turned out to be Aubrey, a secretary in Peter's firm who scouted the building site and helped forge the testing of the soil samples.
14	14	"Against All Todds"	Brad Silberling	Jamie Pachino	March 2, 2023	4.64
Beverly Crest has returned to the firm, and pressures Margaret to settle a client's divorce quickly so that she might become named partner. Margaret has Todd investigate the pair for infidelities. Unfortunately, Veronica returns and asks Todd for favors so that she can disappear. However, a mysterious woman leads Todd to get framed for all sorts of illegal activities, even roping in Margaret to getting arrested for illegal gambling. Margaret and Todd eventually get Veronica to confess on tape after faking a trial and handing over decoy recording devices. However, Veronica manages to trick the mysterious woman to go back to prison instead. Susan kisses Todd spontaneously, but runs away.
15	15	"Ivan the Terrible"	Jay Karas	Steven Paul Martinez	March 9, 2023	4.60
Notorious hacker "Ivan the Terrible", really a teenaged girl named Ava, breaks into the Department of Defense and steals several highly classified documents suggesting that chemicals were illegally dumped in the zoo. Working for the DoD is Natalie Harris, an old college rival of Margaret's. As part of her condition of bail, Ava, an emancipated minor, is not allowed to access the internet and must be monitored 24/7, so Margaret has Todd do it. Todd discovers that partner Alistair Song has been siphoning off funds from the firm's clients and been putting it into a misspelled account in Denver. This last revelation has the board unanimously vote him out, turning the firm into Crest and Founding.
16	16	"Twelve Worried Persons"	Ali LeRoi	Scott Prendergast	March 30, 2023	4.29
During Susan's first trial as lead chair, one of the jury members is killed during her opening arguments. Margaret defends the lead suspect, Amy, former Miss Rose Queen, who is later learned to be the original target. Todd forms a bond with Amy, and they informally date. Alison decides to leave her husband.
17	17	"The First Date Is the Deepest"	Daniel Willis	Earl Davis	April 13, 2023	4.55
Beverly asks Todd to investigate various potential lawyers she is considering making named partners, including Gus Easton who happens to be going on a date with Margaret that Saturday. Margaret pursues a malpractice case when a doctor kills the mother of an autistic man during a supposedly routine operation using a proprietary robot. Alison is living out of suitcases in the hospital's on-call sleep room.
18	18	"Gloom and Boom"	Nick Gomez	Stefanie Mah Woodburn	April 27, 2023	4.76
Margaret and Susan have been working to stay an execution of a man about to be given the death penalty, the first case of capital punishment in the state for 28 years. His execution will be at 6 that night, and the governor couldn't be counted on as she needs an emergency surgery; the hope is she'll be fine in 3-4 hours, in case the motion doesn't work. A supposed walk-in client for Margaret reveals she has a bomb strapped to her, and demands that the execution be allowed to continue, but should otherwise proceed as if it is business as usual. Todd bursts into Margaret's office, knocking the door into the woman and causes Margaret to yell at him, "firing" him for his bad work on the Hedges case (another incident with a bomb threat). Todd, Francey and Lyle investigate and learn that the woman was actually the S.O. of a nephew of the victim. He comes up later with Alison, and holds her hostage along with everyone else left in the office. Susan manages to get a video of a confession from the office, having the judge stay the execution just minutes before the deadline.
19	19	"86'd"	Larry Teng	Lisa Kyonga Parsons	May 4, 2023	4.85
Lauren Park, chef and a classmate of both Todd and Susan, initially sues famed chef Jax for abusive work environment, until she finds him dead early one morning. Margaret grows closer to the owner of the restaurant through a shared love of wine, and learning that he has Parkinson's Disease, just like Harry did. Chasing down a suspect, Todd licks some corn smut and becomes violently ill for the day, forcing Margaret to take his place undercover as a dishwasher. Meanwhile, in an attempt to recover, Todd puts on his mother's blazer and sunglasses, which leads another restaurant to think he's a famous food reviewer and bring him in. Ultimately, it's revealed that Jax was the one who had Parkinson's, which is why he yelled at Lauren for underseasoning her dishes as he was losing his sense of taste.
20	20	"More Fang for Your Chuck"	Stuart Gillard	Elizabeth J.B. Klaviter & Nicole French	May 11, 2023	4.53
Chuck organizes a Golden Ticket giveaway during hockey season, but gets investigated by the FBI as it seems that the winners are not quite so random after all. Evidence mounts against Chuck as he unknowingly sets himself up to admitting to embezzling while under interrogation, and his trusting nature allows anyone working at the stadium to set him up. Todd has a fear of spiders, especially the mascot for the home team, the Portland Widows. Alison decides to officially file for divorce.
21	21	"Are You There Todd? It's Me, Margaret"	Nancy Hower	Scott Prendergast	May 18, 2023	4.41
Margaret has been mediating the settlement for the victims of a float crashing into a crowd of people during a parade, injuring 40. However, on the final day of the settlement, Margaret gets extremely sick and asks Todd to agree to the settlement for her. However, after overhearing the opposing lawyers brag about how little they're going to pay out, Todd claims to represent the victims and rejects the agreement. Forced to tell the truth (or else risk going to jail for fraud), compulsive liar Todd must now stall for time as Margaret figures out what "Crimson Monday" means and how to get a bigger settlement deal. Margaret kisses Gus after her divorce is finalized. Todd gets his PI license back. Margaret, after standing up against Beverly, becomes a named partner of the firm, but returns home to find Harry, back from Iceland, regretting leaving.

=== Season 2 (2024) ===
No. overall	No. in season	Title	Directed by	Written by	Original release date	U.S. viewers (millions)
22	1	"Iceland Was Horrible"	Nancy Hower	Scott Prendergast	February 15, 2024	4.91
23	2	"Your Day in Court"	Nick Gomez	Jamie Pachino	February 22, 2024	4.27
24	3	"The Queen of Courts"	Daniel Willis	Steve Paul Martinez	February 29, 2024	4.53
25	4	"Dial Margaret for Murder"	Robin Givens	Stefanie Mah Woodburn	March 14, 2024	4.18
Todd wakes up groggy in a hospital bed after appendicitis, thinking he heard a mysterious woman in red discussing the murder of a judge with the patient in the other bed in his room, 405. With Todd out of commission, Margaret takes over the investigation by tailing the woman in red to a cat show where one of the judges turns out to be a real judge, who is trying a case where one of the defendants is killed. Meanwhile Todd's head clears and the other patient has been replaced by a detective who is Todd's hero, and helps him solve the crime.
26	5	"End on a High Note"	Marcus Stokes	Nicole French	April 11, 2024	4.33
27	6	"Is the Jury Out?"	Todd Holland	Scott Prendergast & Katherine Langenfeld	April 18, 2024	4.59
28	7	"Faux-Bituary"	Jaime Eliezer Karas	Lisa Kyonga Parsons	April 25, 2024	4.48
29	8	"P.I.'s Wide Shut"	Ruba Nadda	Earl Davis	May 2, 2024	4.17
30	9	"The Broker"	Nancy Hower	Wendy Mericle	May 9, 2024	4.41
31	10	"The Tooth Is Out There"	Stuart Gillard	Teleplay by : Elizabeth Klaviter & Scott Prendergast; Story by : Elizabeth J.B. Klaviter	May 16, 2024	4.40

== Production ==
=== Development ===
On February 3, 2022, it was announced that CBS had given a pilot order to an untitled mother and son legal drama from Scott Prendergast. The series is produced by Prendergast, Phil McGraw, Jay McGraw, and Julia Eisenmann. The pilot episode was also written by Prendergast. On March 15, 2022, Liz Kruger and Craig Shapiro joined the series as showrunners and executive producers.

On May 12, 2022, it was announced that CBS had given the production, titled So Help Me Todd, a series order. It was also announced that Elizabeth Klaviter had replaced Kruger and Shapiro as the series' showrunner. On October 19, 2022, the series received a full season order. On February 2, 2023, CBS renewed the series for a second season.

=== Casting ===
In March 2022, it was announced that Geena Davis had signed on to star in the series. Shortly after, Skylar Astin was announced to star opposite her, as her son. Madeline Wise and Inga Schlingmann also joined the cast in lead roles. After having filmed the pilot, it was announced that Davis had exited the series. On March 23, 2022, it was announced that Marcia Gay Harden had replaced Davis. A few days later, it was announced that Rosa Evangelina Arredondo and Tristen J. Winger had also joined the cast in series regular roles. On March 3, 2023, it was reported that Briga Heelan is set to guest star on the series' March 30 episode titled "Twelve Worried Persons". On December 23, 2023, it was announced that Lisa Rinna is set to guest star on the second-season premiere episode. On February 7, 2024, it was reported that Heather Morris was cast in a recurring role while Sandra Bernhard was cast in guest starring role for the second season. On March 12, 2024, it was announced that Jenifer Lewis is set to guest star for the second season.

=== Filming ===
Production on the pilot began in March 2022 in Vancouver, British Columbia. Filming for the rest of the season began on July 27, 2022, and concluded on April 11, 2023. A TD Bank office in downtown Vancouver serves as Margaret's law firm.

== Broadcast ==
On May 18, 2022, CBS announced its fall broadcast schedule for the 2022-23 television season, with So Help Me Todd airing on Thursdays at 9:00PM ET. The series began airing on September 29, 2022, on CBS. It also simulcasts on Global TV in Canada. The first-season finale aired on May 18, 2023. The second season premiered on February 15, 2024. The series finale aired on May 16, 2024.

== Cancellation ==
On April 19, 2024, CBS canceled the series after two seasons. A few days later, it was reported that fans are campaigning to save the show by starting petitions such as one titled as "Save So Help Me Todd on CBS" and another "Renew So Help Me Todd for a 3rd season" on Change.org. There is also a Facebook group called "Save So Help Me Todd".

== Reception ==
=== Critical response ===
The review aggregator website Rotten Tomatoes reported a 56% approval rating with an average rating of 8/10, based on nine critic reviews. Metacritic, which uses a weighted average, assigned a score of 51 out of 100 based on six critics, indicating "mixed or average reviews".

=== Ratings ===
==== Overall ====
Viewership and ratings per season of So Help Me Todd
Season	Timeslot (ET)	Episodes	First aired		Last aired		TV season
Season	Timeslot (ET)	Episodes	Date	Viewers (millions)	Date	Viewers (millions)	TV season
1	Thursday 9:00 p.m.	21	September 29, 2022	4.82	May 18, 2023	4.41	2022–23
2	Thursday 9:00 p.m.	10	February 15, 2024	4.91	May 16, 2024	4.40	2023–24

==== Season 1 ====
Viewership and ratings per episode of So Help Me Todd
No.	Title	Air date	Rating (18–49)	Viewers (millions)	DVR (18–49)	DVR viewers (millions)	Total (18–49)	Total viewers (millions)
1	"Pilot"	September 29, 2022	0.4	4.82	0.2	1.79	0.6	6.60
2	"Co-Pilot"	October 6, 2022	0.3	4.41	0.2	1.95	0.5	6.35
3	"Second Second Chance"	October 13, 2022	0.4	4.49	0.2	1.68	0.6	6.17
4	"Corduroy Briefs"	October 20, 2022	0.3	4.30	0.2	1.76	0.5	6.06
5	"Let the Wright One In"	October 27, 2022	0.3	4.62	0.2	1.76	0.5	6.38
6	"So Help Me Pod"	November 3, 2022	0.3	3.93	0.2	1.80	0.5	5.73
7	"Long Lost Lawrence"	November 10, 2022	0.3	4.37	0.2	1.83	0.5	6.20
8	"Big Bang Theories"	December 8, 2022	0.4	4.48	—N/a	—N/a	—N/a	—N/a
9	"Swipe Wright"	December 15, 2022	0.4	4.70	—N/a	—N/a	—N/a	—N/a
10	"The Devil You Know"	January 5, 2023	0.4	4.80	0.2	1.84	0.6	6.63
11	"Side Effects May Include Murder"	January 12, 2023	0.4	4.90	0.2	1.87	0.6	6.77
12	"Psilo-Sibling"	February 2, 2023	0.4	5.16	—N/a	—N/a	—N/a	—N/a
13	"Wall of Fire"	February 9, 2023	0.4	5.30	—N/a	—N/a	—N/a	—N/a
14	"Against All Todds"	March 2, 2023	0.3	4.64	—N/a	—N/a	—N/a	—N/a
15	"Ivan the Terrible"	March 9, 2023	0.3	4.60	—N/a	—N/a	—N/a	—N/a
16	"Twelve Worried Persons"	March 30, 2023	0.3	4.29	—N/a	—N/a	—N/a	—N/a
17	"The First Date Is the Deepest"	April 13, 2023	0.3	4.55	—N/a	—N/a	—N/a	—N/a
18	"Gloom and Boom"	April 27, 2023	0.4	4.76	—N/a	—N/a	—N/a	—N/a
19	"86'd"	May 4, 2023	0.3	4.85	—N/a	—N/a	—N/a	—N/a
20	"More Fang for Your Chuck"	May 11, 2023	0.4	4.53	—N/a	—N/a	—N/a	—N/a
21	"Are You There Todd? It's Me, Margaret"	May 18, 2023	0.3	4.41	—N/a	—N/a	—N/a	—N/a

==== Season 2 ====
Viewership and ratings per episode of So Help Me Todd
No.	Title	Air date	Rating (18–49)	Viewers (millions)	DVR (18–49)	DVR viewers (millions)	Total (18–49)	Total viewers (millions)
1	"Iceland Was Horrible"	February 15, 2024	0.4	4.91	—N/a	—N/a	—N/a	—N/a
2	"Your Day in Court"	February 22, 2024	0.3	4.27	—N/a	—N/a	—N/a	—N/a
3	"The Queen of Courts"	February 29, 2024	0.3	4.53	—N/a	—N/a	—N/a	—N/a
4	"Dial Margaret for Murder"	March 14, 2024	0.4	4.18	0.1	1.75	0.5	5.93
5	"End on a High Note"	April 11, 2024	0.4	4.33	—N/a	—N/a	—N/a	—N/a
6	"Is the Jury Out?"	April 18, 2024	0.3	4.59	0.1	1.73	0.5	6.31
7	"Faux-Bituary"	April 25, 2024	0.3	4.48	0.1	1.55	0.4	6.03
8	"P.I.'s Wide Shut"	May 2, 2024	0.3	4.17	0.1	1.65	0.4	5.82
9	"The Broker"	May 9, 2024	0.3	4.41	0.1	1.57	0.4	5.97
10	"The Tooth Is Out There"	May 16, 2024	0.4	4.40	0.1	1.45	0.5	5.86

== See also ==
- Crazy Like a Fox, a mid-1980s CBS series with a similar premise
