= B Positive =

American television sitcom (2020–2022)

- Genre: Sitcom
- Created by: Marco Pennette
- Showrunners: Chuck Lorre; Marco Pennette; Jim Patterson; Warren Bell
- Starring: Thomas Middleditch; Annaleigh Ashford; Kether Donohue; Sara Rue; Izzy G; Terrence Terrell; David Anthony Higgins; Darryl Stephens; Linda Lavin; Briga Heelan; Anna Maria Horsford; Héctor Elizondo; Jane Seymour; Ben Vereen; Jim Beaver; D.B. Sweeney
- Theme music composer: Chuck Lorre and Keb' Mo'
- Opening theme: "B Positive" performed by Keb' Mo (season 1–season 2, episode 2); Annaleigh Ashford (season 2, episodes 3–16)
- Composers: Dennis C. Brown and Grant Geissman
- Country of origin: United States
- Original language: English
- No. of seasons: 2
- No. of episodes: 34

Production
- Executive producers: Chuck Lorre; Marco Pennette; Jim Patterson; Warren Bell
- Producers: Peter Chakos; Kristy Cecil; Robinson Green; Jessica Kravitz; Carol Anne Miller
- Cinematography: Gary Baum; Steven V. Silver
- Editor: Peter Chakos
- Camera setup: Multi-camera
- Running time: 19–22 minutes
- Production companies: Chuck Lorre Productions; Warner Bros. Television

Original release
- Network: CBS
- Release: November 5, 2020 – March 10, 2022

B Positive is an American television sitcom created by Marco Pennette, who is also the show's executive producer along with Chuck Lorre for Chuck Lorre Productions and Warner Bros. Television. The series aired on CBS from November 5, 2020, to March 10, 2022.

In May 2021, the series was renewed for a second season, which premiered on October 14, 2021. In May 2022, the series was canceled after two seasons.

== Premise ==
The series initially follows Drew, a therapist and newly divorced father with B-positive blood who needs a kidney donor. When he is unable to find a donor within his family, a woman from his past named Gina offers him one of her kidneys.

Following Drew's successful transplant surgery, the Season 2 focus shifts to Gina, who inherits a large sum of money and buys the retirement home where she works, while Drew reassesses his life goals and sets out to rediscover himself.

The sitcom is inspired by the true story of series creator Marco Pennette, who received a kidney transplant in 2013.

== Cast ==
=== Main ===
- Thomas Middleditch as Drew Dunbar, a divorced father and therapist in need of a kidney transplant and a social life
- Annaleigh Ashford as Gina Dabrowski, a former acquaintance of Drew's from high school who becomes his kidney donor, as her blood is an incredibly rare match for his. Gina initially works as a van driver for the Valley Hills assisted living facility. In season 2, she receives a surprise inheritance from one of the elderly residents, and decides to buy the retirement home.
- Kether Donohue as Gabby, Gina's best friend, a party girl who works with her in the Valley Hills assisted living facility
- Sara Rue as Julia Dunbar (season 1; guest season 2), Drew's ex-wife, a realtor who aspires to climb the social ladder; her frustrations with trying to get Drew to embrace her interests more led to her having an affair that resulted in their split
- Izzy G as Madeline "Maddie" Dunbar (season 1; guest season 2), Drew and Julia's teenage daughter
- Terrence Terrell as Eli Russell (season 1; recurring season 2), a retired football player with an upbeat personality whom Drew meets during dialysis treatment; he has a brief romantic relationship with Gina
- David Anthony Higgins as Jerry Platt (season 2; recurring season 1), a divorced dentist who has been in dialysis for over a year. He always sees the glass half-empty, convinced he'll never find a donor; when he does, his body ends up rejecting the donated kidney. In season 2, he falls due to a heart-related incident, and moves into Valley Hills to recover.
- Darryl Stephens as Gideon (season 2; recurring season 1), an empathetic gay nurse who works at the dialysis center. He cares deeply about the people to whom he gives treatment, often getting involved in their personal lives. There is a recurring theme of Gideon referring to himself in the third-person. In season 2, he becomes head nurse at Valley Hills.
- Linda Lavin as Norma Goldman (season 2; recurring season 1), one of the senior citizens at Valley Hills assisted living facility. She has a maternal, nurturing relationship with Gina, but she can be fairly randy, irresponsible, and demanding. Part of her close bond with Gina stems from the sad fact that Norma and her daughter (mentioned but not seen on the show) are estranged from each other.

=== Recurring ===
- Briga Heelan as Samantha Turner (season 1), an uptight, intense millennial in Drew's dialysis group who does not suffer fools. She is angry about her illness and often takes it out on those around her, but she is ultimately a good-hearted person. She is trying not to let dialysis get in the way of her climbing the corporate ladder. She tells her colleagues that her mother has cancer in order to have an excuse to leave work for dialysis appointments, revealing that if her workmates knew about her kidney failure, it would kill her career "faster than being pregnant."
- Bernie Kopell as Mr. Knudsen (season 1), one of the senior citizens at the Valley Hills assisted living facility. He dies off-screen in the season 2 premiere, leaving millions of dollars for Gina in his will.
- Jason Kravits as Dr. Baskin, Drew's nephrologist
- Adam Chambers as Paul (season 1), one of Gina's friends
- Rosa Salazar (season 1) and Michelle Ortiz (season 2) as Adriana, Drew's ex-girlfriend who has cancer; she leaves him when she learns of his feelings for Gina
- Anna Maria Horsford as Althea Ludlum (season 2), the sarcastic and grumpy administrator of Valley Hills
- Héctor Elizondo as Harry Milton (season 2), a resident at Valley Hills, who spends all of his time and energy trying to keep his terminally-ill wife, Meredith, comfortable. After Meredith's death, he decides to travel down the road with Drew in the camper van.
- Jane Seymour as Bette (season 2), an aging beauty who is incapable of coming to terms with her senior status
- Ben Vereen as Peter Morgan (season 2), a brilliant, retired professor who is facing (and trying to hide) his rapidly fading memory
- Jim Beaver as Spencer Williams (season 2), former NYPD transit cop who was a 9/11 first responder. Politically and socially, he finds it difficult to behave appropriately; he is attracted to Bette but usually just grosses her out with sexist comments.
- D.B. Sweeney as Bert (season 2), a laughably incompetent cook at Valley Hills
- Priscilla Lopez as Meredith Milton (season 2), a resident at Valley Hills who was dealing with her terminal illness as best as she could while trying to help her husband, Harry, move on. She succumbs to her cancer after a romantic Parisian-themed date with Harry.
- Rondi Reed as Irene (season 2), Norma's rude sister, who moves to Valley Hills

=== Guest starring ===
- Tim Bagley as Minister (season 1)
- Jessica Tuck as Dr. Goodson (season 1)
- Jessica Lundy as Charlene (season 1), Gina's stepmother
- Melissa Tang as Megyn (season 1), a patient who occupies Samantha's chair while she is out of town
- Merrick McCartha as Guy (season 1)
- Ernie Grunwald as Mr. Kafkaman (season 2)
- George Wyner as Bill (season 2), Gina's inheritance attorney
- Johnathan McClain as Mark (season 2), a magician that Gina hires to entertain the residents
- Katie Finneran as Natalie (season 2), Gina's older sister
- Christopher Darga as Roy (season 2)
- Anthony Montgomery as Kyle (season 2), Peter's son
- Ryan Cartwright as Asher (season 2), the regional director of Golden Horizons, the rival retirement home of Valley Hills

== Episodes ==
=== Series overview ===
Season	Episodes	Originally released	
Season	Episodes	First released	Last released
1	18	November 5, 2020	May 13, 2021
2	16	October 14, 2021	March 10, 2022

=== Season 1 (2020–21) ===
No. overall	No. in season	Title	Directed by	Written by	Original release date	Prod. code	U.S. viewers (millions)
1	1	"Pilot"	James Burrows	Marco Pennette	November 5, 2020	T11.10137	5.14
Drew, a therapist who recently separated from his wife Julia, discovers that he is in the early stages of renal failure; if he does not get a kidney transplant soon, his condition will become terminal. At a wedding, he runs into Gina, a girl he once knew back in high school, who offers to give him her kidney on the spot. Drew turns her down, but when all of his other attempts to find a donor fail, he reluctantly turns to Gina when he learns her blood type is compatible with his. Gina is given strict instructions to not consume alcohol or drugs for three months before the transplant, but Drew finds her strung out in her apartment and believes she was never serious about helping him. After learning that it would take ten years to get another kidney—time he doesn't have—Drew ambushes Gina at work and successfully begs her to give him a second chance.
2	2	"Die Alysis"	James Burrows	Teleplay by : Chuck Lorre & Marco Pennette & Greg Malins & Darrin Bragg; Story by : Chuck Lorre & Marco Pennette & Heide Perlman	November 12, 2020	T12.16802	4.90
Drew learns from his doctor that his condition has gotten worse, requiring him to undergo weekly dialysis treatments. At the dialysis clinic, he meets fellow patients Eli, Sam, and Jerry. Gina gets in trouble with some loan sharks she borrowed money from, and runs out on Drew when they meet for coffee. He considers dropping her as his donor, but the other dialysis patients convince him that he's very lucky to have found a match. Instead, Drew comes up with a solution: ask Gina to move in with him. She refuses, not wanting to lose her "independence", but when the gangsters trash her apartment, she accepts his offer.
3	3	"Foreign Bodies"	James Burrows	Teleplay by : Alexa Junge & Preston Walker; Story by : Marco Pennette	November 19, 2020	T12.16803	5.20
When Julia visits, Gina tells her that she's Drew's kidney donor, not knowing that Drew hadn't told his ex yet. This forces Drew to also tell Maddie about his condition. Meanwhile, Drew tries to get used to having Gina in the house with all her quirks, including her befriending and bringing home a huge dog. He gradually accepts that Gina is more than just his donor and makes an effort to bond with her. Gina sneaks into Maddie's room and helps her deal with her fear that her father might die.
4	4	"Joint Pain"	Richie Keen	Teleplay by : Dan O'Shannon & Nicholas Fascitelli; Story by : Bob Daily	December 3, 2020	T12.16805	5.29
Bitter over his divorce and tired of feeling like a pushover, Drew gets Gina to provide him with weed to smoke. The experience inspires him to break into Julia's house so he can steal a ceramic owl that represents one of his few happy memories of their marriage. Julia catches him, but finds she is turned on by his assertiveness and they have sex. Despite Drew telling his friends at the clinic that the whole thing was a one-off, he and Julia start meeting secretly to sleep together.
5	5	"High Risk Factor"	Richie Keen	Teleplay by : Michelle Nader & Marco Pennette; Story by : Carol Leifer	December 17, 2020	T12.16804	4.60
Tensions flare when Drew's controlling nature clashes with Gina's desire to live her life; Gina is annoyed that Drew insists on tracking her every move and calling her constantly. Drew defends himself by saying he's only looking out for his donor, but even Maddie tells him he needs to back off. Julia tries to get Gina to stop risking her health, but instead gets persuaded to go skydiving with her, something she never got to do while married to Drew. Drew finally accepts that he can only trust Gina to keep herself safe.
6	6	"Open Heart Surgery"	Scott Ellis	Teleplay by : Bob Daily & Darrin Bragg; Story by : Michelle Nader	January 21, 2021	T12.16806	5.05
Drew is thrilled when he and Gina receive a scheduling notice for her pre-kidney donation psychological evaluation, a critical step on the road to his transplant. But after Gina finds out an ex-boyfriend is getting engaged, she freaks out and Drew in turn panics because this happens right as she's about to do the eval. Things eventually turn out OK, and Gina even inspires Drew to act somewhat less like a grumpy young-old man.
7	7	"Phantom Limb"	Scott Ellis	Teleplay by : Jim Patterson & Alexa Junge & Heide Perlman; Story by : Dan O'Shannon & Bob Daily & Michelle Nader	February 11, 2021	T12.16807	5.17
Drew's response to two shots of bad news (he has to start a strict diet and exercise program after he faints during dialysis, and he is forced to miss his daughter's National Soccer tournament because there isn't any dialysis center he can get to in Ohio) is to gorge himself with junk food and then pick a fight with Gina when she tries to help him get back on track. He later makes amends by standing up on Gina's behalf to her sister, who thinks Gina agreed to the kidney transplant for stupid and selfish reasons.
8	8	"Integration Therapy"	Scott Ellis	Teleplay by : Bob Daily & Dan O'Shannon & Carol Leifer; Story by : Alexa Junge & Jim Patterson & Heide Perlman	February 18, 2021	T12.16808	5.10
Drew is dining alone at a restaurant when Julia walks in, and he soon realizes that all of their "couple friends" remained friends with her and have no interest in him. Gina prompts him to have a party for the dialysis group that weekend to show he can be sociable. The party initially is carried by Gina, but when she has to leave, Drew manages to bond with the group. Gina is hurt when Drew talks about friends always drifting apart, thinking it suggests the two of them will not remain friends after the transplant. However, Drew buys Gina a car after learning her motorcycle cannot be repaired, and sets up a schedule of "payments" that will force them to stay in touch for decades to come.
9	9	"B Negative"	Scott Ellis	Teleplay by : Carol Leifer & Heide Perlman & Greg Malins; Story by : Marco Pennette & Dan O'Shannon & Darrin Bragg	February 25, 2021	T12.16809	5.19
Jerry gets the call that he's a match for his kidney transplant, and the group is excited for their friend as well as imagining what it will be like when they get their own new kidneys. Drew even makes long-postponed plans to take his daughter to Iceland. However, when Jerry's body rejects his transplant, everyone is devastated, and Drew only gives Jerry a don't-give-up pep talk to set up his admission to Gina that he was lying and the fact that he stops going to dialysis and heads to the airport. Elsewhere, Gina and Norma run into conflict when Gina decides she'd like a more important job to give meaning to her life, and a hurt Norma takes it personally.
10	10	"B Negative Part 2"	Richie Keen	Teleplay by : Marco Pennette & Bob Daily & Michelle Nader; Story by : Alexa Junge & Nicholas Fascitelli & Preston Walker	March 4, 2021	T12.16810	5.06
While Drew's cliffhanging airport goodbye last week ends up being him sending his daughter and ex-wife on an all-expenses paid trip to Iceland and he returns home, he remains depressed over Jerry's transplant failure and turns to drinking Gina's homebrewed beer and asking her for drugs. After taking an unidentified tablet, Drew vanishes and Gina and the dialysis group go to find him, eventually seeing him passed out on someone's lawn. Drew learns his "drug-induced visions" were caused by uremia after he missed dialysis, and he decides he will get back in the fight. Jerry returns to dialysis and is cheered by a video of Drew's goofy antics.
11	11	"Recessive Gina"	Richie Keen	Teleplay by : Alexa Junge & Dan O'Shannon & Heide Perlman; Story by : Marco Pennette & Bob Daily & Michelle Nader	March 11, 2021	T12.16811	4.95
Drew finds out that Gina needs her father's medical records to see if she's more likely to have serious issues with the kidney transplant. Gina initially says it doesn't matter because her father is dead and she doesn't want to talk to her stepmother, but she changes her mind when Drew tells her he's going to cancel the transplant out of concern for her. Gina takes Drew and Norma (who is sad because she and her daughter can't get along well) to Philadelphia to get the records, and fills them in about her sad childhood while admitting her father is alive and she hasn't seen him for 20 years. She later finds out her father actually died last year, but she gets the medical information and a box of memories that allows her to have a tearful but hope-inducing goodbye to her late dad.
12	12	"Canine Extraction"	Phill Lewis	Teleplay by : Jamie Rhonheimer & Jessica Kravitz & Carol Leifer; Story by : Chuck Lorre & Jim Patterson & Dan O'Shannon	April 1, 2021	T12.16812	3.85
The combination of Gina finding out that Cannoli the dog's owner is coming back to the U.S. and Drew being treated distantly by daughter Maddie leads to the two of them switching roles: Gina busts Maddie for drinking beer and tells Drew, while Drew horrifies Gina when he "dog-naps" Cannoli. Eventually, Drew realizes he's projecting his feelings of Maddie growing up and away from him, and she tells her dad she still loves him.
13	13	"Inflammatory Response"	Scott Ellis	Teleplay by : Jim Patterson & Dan O'Shannon & Alexa Junge; Story by : Jamie Rhonheimer & Jessica Kravitz & Heide Perlman	April 8, 2021	T12.16813	3.80
Norma moves into Drew's house after she accidentally sets her room on fire at the retirement home. Also, a romance heats up between Gina and Eli. Drew is strongly against it because he thinks it will affect his friendship with Eli. Out of respect for Drew, Gina agrees to not act on her feelings for Eli, but ultimately does.
14	14	"Love Life Support"	Scott Ellis	Teleplay by : Heide Perlman & Jamie Rhonheimer & Nicholas Fascitelli; Story by : Marco Pennette & Michelle Nader & Bob Daily	April 15, 2021	T12.16814	4.08
Convinced that Gina is different from other women he's dated, Eli asks her to go to Las Vegas with him. Gina is game, until she learns that Eli is taking her as his date to a family wedding. She panics by inviting over an old boyfriend, but stops short of sleeping with him. Meanwhile, Drew goes overboard trying to act like he's happy for Gina and Eli, but Norma sees through it.
15	15	"Miss Diagnosis"	Richie Keen	Teleplay by : Nicholas Fascitelli & Jamie Rhonheimer & Preston Walker; Story by : Darrin Bragg & Alexa Junge & Carol Liefer	April 22, 2021	T12.16815	3.90
Drew meets a woman named Adriana (Rosa Salazar) in the hospital vending area outside the dialysis room. After the two have a great first date, Drew decides to tell Adriana about his kidney failure. He is surprised and dejected when Adriana later tells him via text that they shouldn't pursue a relationship. Drew soon sees Adriana in their initial meeting spot, and she tells him she has cancer. Drew says he doesn't care, and the two agree to another date. Meanwhile, Eli prepares to audition for a local sportscaster job with Gina's help, but after the audition, the station informs him they are choosing someone else. Eli then confesses to Gina that he really needed the job, because he's broke.
16	16	"A Cute Asphyxiation"	Richie Keen	Teleplay by : Bob Daily & Jessica Kravitz & John "Jack" O'Brien; Story by : Jim Patterson & Heide Perlman & Dan O'Shannon	April 29, 2021	T12.16816	4.03
Drew and Gina's nascent relationships with cancer patient Adriana and dialysis squad member Eli each hit some snags. Drew runs into turbulence when his efforts to help care for Adriana after her latest chemo treatments are met with her ordering him to go away, and Eli is angry when Gina clues Drew in about Eli's financial woes (this leads to the dialysis group making a nice gesture to buy Eli's eBay-listed Super Bowl ring and give it back to him, which in turns makes Eli feel even worse). Adriana later apologizes to Drew and they get their romance going again, while Eli thanks Gina for her help and tells her he's starting a Seahawks-focused podcast. Elsewhere, Norma wants Gina to come with her on a cruise to Italy, but Gina helps Norma reach out to and successfully invite Norma's own daughter so they can reconcile before it's too late. Before hearing that Eli wants his Super Bowl ring back, Jerry tries to score in a bar by flashing the ring -- with no takers.
17	17	"Transplanticipation"	Richie Keen	Teleplay by : Dan O'Shannon & Carol Liefer & Jessica Kravitz; Story by : Jamie Rhonheimer & Alexa Junge & Aaron Huffines	May 6, 2021	T12.16817	4.13
Drew and Gina are called into the office of Drew's nephrologist and are worried it's bad news, but it's actually the best possible news: their blood tests have led to a green light for the kidney transplant and it'll happen as soon as the schedule has an opening. Gina makes plans for the future that involve moving back in with old roomie and party warrior Gabby, but she later realizes during a low-key birthday dinner with Gideon that she doesn't really want to be that person anymore. Gideon relates how he's thinking he should give up on his acting dream now that he's 35, but Gina tells him he'll be a success in whatever he wants to do and sings him "Happy Birthday". Drew can't wait to share his good news with Adriana, but she stuns him when she says that her cancer has spread and she's going to stop treatment. Drew initially pisses her off by pushing her not to quit fighting and later makes amends by getting a huge assist from Gina in getting Adriana into a cancer-fighting trial program in Switzerland. In order to support her, Drew passes on a surprise opening in the next week to have the transplant done sooner and instead tells Adriana he will go with her overseas and come back to the U.S. himself to get his new kidney. Also, the dialysis group gets a new member, a social influencer who is very Samantha-like in her lack of tact.
18	18	"Life Expectancy"	Richie Keen	Teleplay by : Jim Patterson & Marco Pennette & Chuck Lorre; Story by : Jamie Rhonheimer & Jessica Kravitz & Eric Wen	May 13, 2021	T12.16818	4.42
With the transplant on the near horizon, Drew looks forward to helping Adriana through her fight against cancer in Switzerland, but Adriana tells Drew she is going overseas without him because she refuses to let his transplant be jeopardized. Gina is planning to move back in with Gabby after she recovers, but tells Gideon she doesn't want to fall back into the party girl lifestyle, only to also find out that the prospect of renting a crummy apartment is enough to make her break down in tears. Drew has his last dialysis treatment and gets both a nice gift from the group and advice to get Gina a great present as well. Gina decides not to move in with Eli because she wants to keep their relationship growing at the right pace. She later tearfully tells Drew how much he means to her and how he's changed her life for the better, and Drew gives her a wonderful gift: a "Transplant" keychain with a house key on it, because he wants her to stay in the house as long as she wants. After a kind visit from his ex-wife, Drew and Gina head to the hospital in a limousine, and Gina's old FWB makes a video of all their friends and family telling them good luck. It's then time for the transplant, and Drew starts counting backwards from 10 as the screen goes dark.

=== Season 2 (2021–22) ===
No. overall	No. in season	Title	Directed by	Written by	Original release date	Prod. code	U.S. viewers (millions)
19	1	"Love, Taxes and a Kidney"	James Widdoes	Chuck Lorre & Jim Patterson & Warren Bell	October 14, 2021	T12.17251	3.95
Drew and Gina both come out of transplant surgery doing well, and Drew later learns from Dr. Baskin that enough time has passed that his body will not reject the new kidney, making him fully healthy again. He awkwardly visits the dialysis center to share the good news with his friends, and celebrates with Gina while struggling with feelings for her. Meanwhile, Gina learns that Valley Hills resident Mr. Knudsen, whom she showed great care for, has died and that he put her in his will. She's later shocked to receive a check for $48 million (about $24 million after taxes). She asks Drew to keep it secret, then goes on a shopping spree but finds it has not brought her the expected happiness. While crying in Drew's arms, Gina gets a call from Eli and agrees to take a trip to Vermont with him. In the middle of the night, Drew visits Gideon to tell him that he's in love with Gina.
20	2	"Vermont, Switzerland and Connecticut"	James Widdoes	Teleplay by : Chuck Lorre & Adam Chase; Story by : Jim Patterson & Warren Bell	October 21, 2021	T12.17252	3.76
Gina and Eli take a romantic trip to Vermont, but it's ruined by Eli's ego when his credit cards are denied and Gina has to pay. When Eli learns of Gina's newfound wealth, it changes their dynamic and they take a break. Meanwhile, Drew gets a surprise visit from Adriana. They have a romantic reunion, but Adriana soon catches onto Drew's feelings for Gina, and she leaves in anger. Elsewhere, Ms. Ludlum, Gina's boss at Valley Hills, announces another round of severe budget cuts, inspiring Gina to use her millions to buy the facility.
21	3	"Bagels, Billiards and a Magic Show"	James Widdoes	Teleplay by : Jim Patterson & Warren Bell & Jamie Rhonheimer; Story by : Chuck Lorre & Adam Chase & Jessica Kravitz	October 28, 2021	T12.17253	4.32
Gina has purchased the nursing home and begins to make some changes. She hires Gideon as the head nurse, and several new residents are introduced. Meanwhile, Gina asks Drew to counsel a stubborn resident named Harry (Héctor Elizondo) who is having a hard time dealing with his wife's terminal illness. Harry is tough on a meek Drew but eventually warms up to the guy and invites him to spend time playing billiards. Note: This was the first use of updated opening title sequence and sung by Annaleigh Ashford.
22	4	"Baseball, Walkers and Wine"	Phill Lewis	Teleplay by : Chuck Lorre & Adam Chase & Carol Leifer; Story by : Warren Bell & Heide Perlman & Darrin Bragg	November 4, 2021	T12.17254	4.41
To give Harry's ill wife Meredith a break from his constant hovering, Drew takes Harry to a local minor league baseball game, where he reveals his true feelings for Gina. Drew plans to tell Gina at their dinner date, but she sees Eli walk in with another woman and begins to drink heavily. A drunk Gina later kisses Drew but Drew's response – to tell Gina that he loves her – is ruined because she passes out before he says it. He just covers her with a blanket and goes home. Meanwhile, Meredith's illness gives Norma perspective on her stubborn decision to refuse needed hip surgery, while Bette is totally against Spencer's behavior towards women.
23	5	"Novocaine, Bond and Bocce"	Phill Lewis	Teleplay by : Jim Patterson & Jamie Rhonheimer & Preston Walker; Story by : Chuck Lorre & Adam Chase & Tim Kelleher	November 11, 2021	T12.17255	4.03
In the aftermath of her drunk-kissing Drew, Gina tells him she needs time without a man to learn who she is after all the changes in her life. When Gina later sees Jerry to crown a cracked tooth, he collapses with her in his dentist chair. As he recovers in the hospital, Jerry reveals to his friends that he has a heart issue and sometimes faints. Gina and Gideon suggest he temporarily move into Valley Hills, where there is help available, until he can get surgery. Jerry is adamant about not living in a seniors facility until he faints again and decides it's a good idea, and he is immediately well-liked by the other residents. A screening of a James Bond film leads Peter to unknowingly repeat an anecdote about Ian Fleming; Bette picks up on this, and Peter later puts a post-it note next to her picture with the writing "She Knows" before shedding tears over his mental decline.
24	6	"A Dishwasher, a Fire and a Remote Control"	Phill Lewis	Teleplay by : Warren Bell & Heide Perlman & Jessica Kravitz; Story by : Chuck Lorre & Jim Patterson & Carol Leifer	November 18, 2021	T12.17256	4.03
Drew tries different things to deal with his loneliness. After numerous complaints from Valley Hills residents about the food, Gina realizes she has to fire the cook, Bert. This proves difficult, as she's never had to fire anyone in her life. Bette confides to Jerry that she's leaving to live in her son's basement. However, she returns a day later, saying her son felt like her presence may ruin his marriage. Spencer argues with Peter about the volume of his television, with Peter countering that he needs the TV on to fall asleep.
25	7	"A Camper, a Compass and a Cannoli"	Richie Keen	Teleplay by : Chuck Lorre & Heide Perlman & Jessica Kravitz; Story by : Jamie Rhonheimer & Adam Chase & Carol Leifer	December 2, 2021	T12.17257	4.10
Gina brings her dog, Cannoli, to Valley Hills. Cannoli begins to bond with the residents, especially Meredith. Shunned by Gina and wanting to take some time to rediscover himself post-surgery, Drew buys a camper van and makes plans to take a trip across the country.
26	8	"A Dog, a Mousse and a Bat"	Richie Keen	Teleplay by : Jim Patterson & Warren Bell & Jessica Kravitz; Story by : Chuck Lorre & Heide Perlman & Deanna Morgan	December 9, 2021	T12.17258	4.34
On the occasion of Harry's and Meredith's wedding anniversary, Gina throws them a special French-themed dinner party. Drew takes to the road in the camper van and stops at a campsite. He makes a connection with another camper and sleeps with her, only to wake up and learn that she's robbed him. After a fight with Spencer, Bette sends him a suggestive photo of herself. As the day winds down, Harry returns to his room to find Meredith unconscious and unresponsive.
27	9	"Heartburn, Woodstock and Ribs"	Richie Keen	Teleplay by : Warren Bell & Adam Chase & Carol Leifer; Story by : Chuck Lorre & Jamie Rhonheimer & Justin Mooney	January 6, 2022	T12.17259	5.03
As news of Meredith's condition hits, Gina is in jail over an old charge involving selling fake IDs. Gabby helps get her bailed out, and they join Spencer, Bette, Peter, Jerry and Gideon in the hospital waiting room. Drew returns from his camping trip and joins the group. Harry emerges from Meredith's room to say she died. In the midst of the tragedy, Gina gets a chuckle over learning that Drew's one-night-stand robbed him.
28	10	"S'mores, Elvis and a Cubano"	Scott Ellis	Teleplay by : Jim Patterson & Heide Perlman & Darrin Bragg; Story by : Carol Leifer & Jessica Kravitz & Preston Walker	January 13, 2022	T12.17260	4.96
Still reeling from his wife's death, Harry asks Drew if he can accompany him on his cross-country trip. Drew agrees, but is taken aback when Harry insists they re-route the trip to Wisconsin, so he can spread Meredith's ashes in a special place. Meanwhile, Gina's older sister Natalie (Katie Finneran) pays a visit and invites Gina to watch her sing at a local club. Natalie later tells Gina she's got cancer, and Gina wonders if it's a ploy for money, as Natalie has conned her in the past.
29	11	"Louisville, Bubbaroo and Sully"	Scott Ellis	Teleplay by : Heide Perlman & Jamie Rhonheimer & Jessica Kravitz; Story by : Jim Patterson & Warren Bell & Adam Chase	January 20, 2022	T12.17261	5.03
When Ms. Ludlum leaks that Gina is fielding a call from a lawyer, the residents freak out because they think Gina is selling the place. She soon assures them that the call is about her own legal issues. Peter suggests that his lawyer son, Kyle, represent her. Gina ends up agreeing to a date with Kyle, only to learn from Peter that Kyle is married. Gina confronts Kyle, who says he got divorced three years ago. The two then discuss Peter's diminished memory. Elsewhere, Drew and Harry continue their road trip, but the van suffers a broken water pump. After a mechanic tells them the repair will cost $2000, Harry insists that he and Drew can buy the parts and do the repair themselves. Spencer continues avoiding Bette after he refused to go into her room a couple nights before. He insists he likes her, but panicked because he hasn't been with a woman since his wife passed. Gina goes into Peter's room to discuss Kyle, and finds the display Peter is using to remind him of things.
30	12	"Dagobah, a Room and a Chimney Sweep"	Scott Ellis	Teleplay by : Warren Bell & Adam Chase & Carol Leifer; Story by : Jim Patterson & Jamie Rhonheimer & Darrin Bragg	January 27, 2022	T12.17262	4.96
The residents bicker over whom should get a premium room after the previous resident dies, putting Gina in a bind. Norma, Spencer and Bette all lay claim to the room for different reasons, but Spencer later fights for Bette to get the room upon learning that's what a good "boyfriend" should do. Drew and Harry arrive at the Grand Tetons and enjoy a spectacular view, but Drew is disappointed that the experience hasn't transformed him like he expected. They then run out of propane in the van, and find themselves breaking into an empty cabin to keep warm.
31	13	"A Boss, a Bear Claw and a Defibrillator"	Scott Ellis	Teleplay by : Jim Patterson & Heide Perlman & Jamie Rhonheimer; Story by : Warren Bell & Jessica Kravitz & Preston Walker	January 27, 2022	T12.17263	4.72
After not being invited for a night out at a bar with Gideon and Gabby, Gina learns she talks too much about work when around them. She promises to just be a friend while at the bar and not a boss, but it doesn't work out. Drew returns and, claiming "van experience," offers to fill in driving the Valley Hills van. Meanwhile, Jerry learns he's healthy enough to leave Valley Hills and return to his home. But after one night alone, he realizes he misses the residents, and fakes another heart issue to get readmitted.
32	14	"Osteoporosis, Benihana and a Slinky"	Scott Ellis	Teleplay by : Aaron Huffines & Christian Honce & Tessa Evelyn; Story by : Chuck Lorre & Carol Leifer & Jamie Rhonheimer	February 24, 2022	T12.17264	4.61
Norma's hyper-critical younger sister Irene (Rondi Reed) arrives for a visit and, despite Norma's objections, decides she wants to move into Valley Hills. Spencer gets nervous about his upcoming sleepover with Bette, admitting he's never had sex with anyone after his wife passed. Drew goes on a date with Harry's grand-niece, which doesn't go well, so he drops her off early. Drew later catches Gina peeking into the van windows in an effort to spy on him and his date. Drew tells Gina they need to have a serious talk about their feelings for each other, but Gina says she's still not ready.
33	15	"Payroll, a Waterwall and Wham!"	Dana deVally Piazza	Teleplay by : Adam Chase & Carol Leifer & Jessica Kravitz; Story by : Jim Patterson & Warren Bell & Heide Perlman	March 3, 2022	T12.17265	4.75
After Ms. Ludlum quits to accept an offer from rival retirement home Golden Horizons, Gina becomes overwhelmed with all the extra work. When the competitor also starts poaching residents, Gina and Drew visit the place as a married couple looking to move their "mother" (Norma) and her sister (Irene) into rooms. They find there are many amenities that Valley Hills can't compete with. The Valley Hills staff and residents rally to support Gina, and cover many of Ms. Ludlum's tasks. Gina later begs Ms. Ludlum to return to Valley Hills as general manager, offering her a raise and 10 percent ownership. Ms. Ludlum says Golden Horizons is nice, but it lacks the soul of Valley Hills, and says she'll think about Gina's offer. Meanwhile, Drew ponders taking a road trip to Alaska or staying close to Gina. Harry tells Drew that if Gina is still avoiding a relationship with him, it's probably not going to happen.
34	16	"Juneau, Froyo and Mario Kart"	Phill Lewis	Teleplay by : Chuck Lorre & Jim Patterson & Warren Bell & Adam Chase; Story by : Carol Leifer & Heide Perlman & Jamie Rhonheimer & Jessica Kravitz	March 10, 2022	T12.17266	4.73
Gina is conflicted when Golden Horizons offers to buy Valley Hills for well above what she paid for it. When she refuses, Golden Horizons does everything it can to poach more Valley Hills residents, but the core group says they will support Gina no matter what. At the same time, Drew has decided to give up on a relationship with Gina, and he makes plans to leave for Alaska. A conversation with Norma makes Gina realize she really does love Drew. She runs out to the parking lot to tell him, but finds the camper van gone.

== Production ==
=== Development ===
The series was among the 14 pilots ordered by CBS in February 2020 and was fast tracked to series the following March, as the pilot had already been completed before production at Warner Bros. Television was suspended due to the COVID-19 pandemic. The pilot was the only pilot completed for the 2020–21 television season for any of the broadcast networks in advance of the upfronts. On May 8, 2020, CBS picked up the series, and CTV followed soon after, picking up the series on June 23, 2020. On October 26, 2020, Jim Patterson joined the series as an executive producer and co-showrunner. The series premiered on November 5, 2020. On December 21, 2020, CBS gave the series a five-episode back order, making the total number of episodes ordered to 18. On May 15, 2021, CBS renewed the series for a second and final season which premiered on October 14, 2021. On October 15, 2021, it was reported that creator and co-showrunner Marco Pennette had left the series at the end of the first season and Patterson would continue to serve as showrunner for the second season. On May 12, 2022, CBS canceled the series after two seasons.

=== Casting ===
On February 19, 2020, it was announced that Annaleigh Ashford had been cast in the pilot. On March 2, 2020, it was announced that Kether Donohue and Sara Rue had joined the cast. The following day, it was announced that Thomas Middleditch had joined the cast in the lead role. Alongside the series picked up announcement, it was reported that Kamryn Kunody was cast in a starring role. On August 11, 2020, Maggie Elizabeth Jones joined the cast in a recasting, replacing Kunody. On September 25, 2020, Terrence Terrell was cast as a series regular. On October 12, 2020, Izzy G was cast to replace Jones in a second recasting while Linda Lavin, Briga Heelan, Darryl Stephens, Bernie Kopell, and David Anthony Higgins were cast in recurring roles and Darien Sills-Evans was cast to guest star. On September 1, 2021, Lavin, Higgins, and Stephens were promoted to series regulars while Hector Elizondo, Jane Seymour, Ben Vereen, Celia Weston, Jim Beaver, and Anna Maria Horsford joined cast in recurring roles for the second season. Weston was to play the character of Meredith, but the role was recast with Priscilla Lopez in the role. On October 5, 2021, it was reported that Michelle Ortiz joined the cast in a recasting, replacing Rosa Salazar for the second season. On October 27, 2021, it was announced that D.B. Sweeney was cast in a recurring role for the second season.

=== Filming ===
B Positive was filmed at Warner Bros. Studios in Burbank, California, but it is set in New Haven, Connecticut.

== Reception ==
=== Critical response ===
On Rotten Tomatoes, the series holds an approval rating of 84% with an average rating of 5.8/10, based on 19 reviews. The website's critics consensus states, "B Positive's familiar sitcom trappings are elevated by its charming cast—especially the weird and winsome comedic stylings of Tony winner Annaleigh Ashford." On Metacritic, it has a weighted average score of 62 out of 100, based on 14 critics, indicating "generally favorable reviews".

=== Ratings ===
==== Overall ====
Viewership and ratings per season of B Positive
Season	Timeslot (ET)	Episodes	First aired		Last aired		TV season	Viewership rank	Avg. viewers (millions)	Avg. 18–49 rating
Season	Timeslot (ET)	Episodes	Date	Viewers (millions)	Date	Viewers (millions)	TV season	Viewership rank	Avg. viewers (millions)	Avg. 18–49 rating
1	Thursday 8:30 p.m. (1–10); Thursday 9:00 p.m. (11); Thursday 9:30 p.m. (12–18)	18	November 5, 2020	5.14	May 13, 2021	4.42	2020–21	47	5.68	0.8
2	Thursday 9:30 p.m. (1–11, 13–14); Thursday 9:01 p.m. (12, 16); Thursday 8:31 p.m. (15)	16	October 14, 2021	3.95	March 10, 2022	4.73	2021–22	43	5.69	0.6

==== Season 1 ====
Viewership and ratings per episode of B Positive
No.	Title	Air date	Rating (18–49)	Viewers (millions)	DVR (18–49)	DVR viewers (millions)	Total (18–49)	Total viewers (millions)
1	"Pilot"	November 5, 2020	0.6	5.14	0.2	1.09	0.8	6.23
2	"Die Alysis"	November 12, 2020	0.5	4.90	0.2	1.13	0.7	6.03
3	"Foreign Bodies"	November 19, 2020	0.6	5.20	—N/a	—N/a	—N/a	—N/a
4	"Joint Pain"	December 3, 2020	0.6	5.29	—N/a	0.90	—N/a	6.20
5	"High Risk Factor"	December 17, 2020	0.5	4.60	—N/a	—N/a	—N/a	—N/a
6	"Open Heart Surgery"	January 21, 2021	0.7	5.05	—N/a	—N/a	—N/a	—N/a
7	"Phantom Limb"	February 11, 2021	0.7	5.17	—N/a	0.92	—N/a	6.09
8	"Integration Therapy"	February 18, 2021	0.6	5.10	—N/a	0.88	—N/a	5.99
9	"B Negative"	February 25, 2021	0.7	5.19	—N/a	0.95	—N/a	6.13
10	"B Negative Part 2"	March 4, 2021	0.7	5.06	—N/a	0.86	—N/a	5.92
11	"Recessive Gina"	March 11, 2021	0.6	4.95	—N/a	1.03	—N/a	5.99
12	"Canine Extraction"	April 1, 2021	0.4	3.85	—N/a	—N/a	—N/a	—N/a
13	"Inflammatory Response"	April 8, 2021	0.5	3.80	0.2	1.17	0.7	4.97
14	"Love Life Support"	April 15, 2021	0.5	4.08	—N/a	—N/a	—N/a	—N/a
15	"Miss Diagnosis"	April 22, 2021	0.5	3.90	0.2	1.06	0.7	4.96
16	"A Cute Asphyxiation"	April 29, 2021	0.4	4.03	0.2	1.02	0.6	5.05
17	"Transplanticipation"	May 6, 2021	0.5	4.13	0.2	0.93	0.6	5.06
18	"Life Expectancy"	May 13, 2021	0.6	4.42	0.2	1.03	0.7	5.46

==== Season 2 ====
Viewership and ratings per episode of B Positive
No.	Title	Air date	Rating (18–49)	Viewers (millions)	DVR (18–49)	DVR viewers (millions)	Total (18–49)	Total viewers (millions)
1	"Love, Taxes and a Kidney"	October 14, 2021	0.5	3.95	0.2	1.19	0.6	5.13
2	"Vermont, Switzerland and Connecticut"	October 21, 2021	0.4	3.76	0.2	1.12	0.6	4.88
3	"Bagels, Billiards and a Magic Show"	October 28, 2021	0.4	4.32	—N/a	—N/a	—N/a	—N/a
4	"Baseball, Walkers and Wine"	November 4, 2021	0.4	4.41	—N/a	—N/a	—N/a	—N/a
5	"Novocaine, Bond and Bocce"	November 11, 2021	0.4	4.03	—N/a	—N/a	—N/a	—N/a
6	"A Dishwasher, a Fire and a Remote Control"	November 18, 2021	0.5	4.03	0.2	1.14	0.6	5.17
7	"A Camper, a Compass and a Cannoli"	December 2, 2021	0.4	4.10	0.2	1.30	0.6	5.40
8	"A Dog, a Mousse and a Bat"	December 9, 2021	0.4	4.34	0.2	1.24	0.6	5.58
9	"Heartburn, Woodstock and Ribs"	January 6, 2022	0.5	5.03	—N/a	—N/a	—N/a	—N/a
10	"S'mores, Elvis and a Cubano"	January 13, 2022	0.5	4.96	—N/a	—N/a	—N/a	—N/a
11	"Louisville, Bubbaroo and Sully"	January 20, 2022	0.5	5.03	—N/a	—N/a	—N/a	—N/a
12	"Dagobah, a Room and a Chimney Sweep"	January 27, 2022	0.5	4.96	—N/a	—N/a	—N/a	—N/a
13	"A Boss, a Bear Claw and a Defibrillator"	January 27, 2022	0.5	4.72	—N/a	—N/a	—N/a	—N/a
14	"Osteoporosis, Benihana and a Slinky"	February 24, 2022	0.4	4.61	—N/a	—N/a	—N/a	—N/a
15	"Payroll, a Waterwall and Wham!"	March 3, 2022	0.5	4.75	—N/a	—N/a	—N/a	—N/a
16	"Juneau, Froyo and Mario Kart"	March 10, 2022	0.4	4.73	—N/a	—N/a	—N/a	—N/a

B Positive : U.S. viewers per episode (millions)

Season	Episode number																	
Season	1	2	3	4	5	6	7	8	9	10	11	12	13	14	15	16	17	18
1	5.14	4.90	5.20	5.29	4.60	5.05	5.17	5.10	5.19	5.06	4.95	3.85	3.80	4.08	3.90	4.03	4.13	4.42
2	3.95	3.76	4.32	4.41	4.03	4.03	4.10	4.34	5.03	4.96	5.03	4.96	4.72	4.61	4.75	4.73	–	

Audience measurement performed by Nielsen Media Research
