= Due Date =

2010 film by Todd Phillips

- Theatrical release poster
- Directed by: Todd Phillips
- Screenplay by: Alan R. Cohen; Alan Freedland; Adam Sztykiel; Todd Phillips
- Story by: Alan R. Cohen; Alan Freedland
- Produced by: Todd Phillips; Dan Goldberg
- Starring: Robert Downey Jr.; Zach Galifianakis; Michelle Monaghan; Juliette Lewis; Jamie Foxx
- Cinematography: Lawrence Sher
- Edited by: Debra Neil-Fisher
- Music by: Christophe Beck
- Production companies: Warner Bros. Pictures; Legendary Pictures; Green Hat Films; Classic Films
- Distributed by: Warner Bros. Pictures
- Release dates: October 31, 2010 (Night Visions); November 5, 2010 (United States)
- Running time: 95 minutes
- Country: United States
- Language: English
- Budget: $65 million
- Box office: $212 million

Due Date is a 2010 American black comedy road film directed by Todd Phillips, who wrote the screenplay with Alan R. Cohen, Alan Freedland, and Adam Sztykiel. The film follows a man (Robert Downey Jr.) who must get across the country to Los Angeles in time for the birth of his child and is forced to road-trip with an aspiring actor (Zach Galifianakis). Michelle Monaghan, Juliette Lewis, and Jamie Foxx also star. Shot in Las Cruces, New Mexico, Atlanta, Georgia, and Tuscaloosa, Alabama, the film premiered at Night Visions on October 31, 2010 and was released by Warner Bros. Pictures on November 5, 2010. It received mixed reviews from critics and grossed $212 million worldwide against a $65 million budget.

== Plot ==
Peter Highman, a successful architect, is due to fly home from Atlanta to Los Angeles to be with his wife Sarah, who is about to give birth. On the way to the airport, he has a chance encounter with Ethan Tremblay and his dog Sonny, who is going to Los Angeles to be an actor and is planning to scatter his recently deceased father's ashes at the Grand Canyon. When Ethan misuses the words "terrorist" and "bomb" while talking to Peter, they are both escorted off the plane. Peter, now on the No Fly List and missing his wallet, agrees to drive with Ethan to Los Angeles.

Ethan stops to buy marijuana, and Peter discovers that they are nearly out of money. Since Peter has no I.D., he gets his wife to wire money to Ethan through Western Union, but discovers he had the money wired to his stage name instead of his legal name. When employee Lonnie refuses to accept Ethan's "stage name I.D.", it leads to a violent altercation.

After a night at a rest stop, Peter impulsively drives off to abandon Ethan, but realizes that he has forgotten to unload the ashes of Ethan's father when he left. This causes him to wrestle with his conscience, before deciding to return, and covering for his absence by saying he had gone to buy breakfast.

Ethan takes over driver duty so Peter can get some rest after a sleepless night, but he falls asleep at the wheel and crashes the car. Peter calls his friend, Darryl, for assistance and decides to part with Ethan, but Darryl persuades Peter otherwise. They arrive at Darryl's house for rest. During their conversation, Ethan discovers hints that Sarah may have been unfaithful, triggering Peter to question Sarah's timely pregnancy. Darryl throws both of them out after mistakenly drinking some of Ethan's father's ashes, which were stored in a coffee tin.

Darryl lets them use his Range Rover to make the rest of the trip. Ethan and Peter get high and begin to bond, but Ethan then mistakenly drives to the Mexico–United States border. Despite assuring Peter that he will handle the situation, Ethan flees, and Peter is arrested for possession of marijuana. The Mexican Federal Police lock Peter up, but Ethan steals a truck and breaks him out, causing several car crashes in the process.

Peter decides to stop at the Grand Canyon for Ethan, who finally scatters his father's ashes. Peter then confesses that he tried to leave Ethan at the rest area. Ethan makes a confession of his own: he has had Peter's wallet and I.D the entire time. Peter seemingly forgives him but then attacks Ethan in a rage, but is interrupted by a call from Sarah, who has just gone into labor. Peter and Ethan leave for California. Ethan finds a gun in the truck and accidentally shoots Peter. Arriving at the hospital where Sarah is in labor, Peter passes out from loss of blood.

Sarah delivers the baby safely, and Peter expresses his discomfort at his new daughter being named Rosie Highman. Ethan leaves to meet with a Hollywood agent while telling Peter to call him. At the end, Ethan guest stars on an episode of his favorite television program, Two and a Half Men, with Peter and Sarah watching it in bed with their daughter. Ethan texts Peter during the episode, indicating that the two have become friends.

== Cast ==
- Robert Downey Jr. as Peter Highman
- Zach Galifianakis as Ethan Tremblay/Ethan Chase
- Michelle Monaghan as Sarah Highman
- Juliette Lewis as Heidi (playing the same character from Old School)
- Jamie Foxx as Darryl Johnson
- Matt Walsh as TSA Agent
- RZA as Airline Screener
- Danny McBride as Western Union Employee Lonnie
- Todd Phillips as Barry
- Mimi Kennedy as Sarah's Mom
- Keegan-Michael Key as New Father
- Aaron Lustig as Dr. Greene
- Marco Rodríguez as Federal Agent
- Brody Stevens as Chauffeur
- Charlie Sheen as Charlie Harper (Cameo)
- Jon Cryer as Alan Harper (Cameo)
- Angus T. Jones as Jake Harper (Cameo)

== Production ==
Alan R. Cohen and Alan Freeland were inspired to write Due Date in 2008, after they both were placed on the No Fly List in addition to being fathers. During the 2010 "Writers Roundtable" from The Hollywood Reporter, Todd Phillips claimed that he co-wrote the script with star Robert Downey Jr., but the Writers Guild of America denied giving credit to the latter.

== Music ==
Due Date (Original Motion Picture Soundtrack) was released on November 2, 2010, by WaterTower Music.

Due Date (Original Motion Picture Soundtrack)

Soundtrack album by Various Artists
- Released: November 2, 2010
- Recorded: 2010
- Label: WaterTower Music

=== iTunes version ===
No.	Title	Artist	Length
1.	"Hold On, I'm Comin'"	Sam & Dave	2:31
2.	"New Moon Rising"	Wolfmother	3:47
3.	"Is There a Ghost"	Band of Horses	2:59
4.	"People Are Crazy"	Billy Currington	3:51
5.	"White Room"	Cream	4:58
6.	"This Is Why I'm Hot"	MIMS	4:17
7.	"Sweet Jane"	Cowboy Junkies	3:35
8.	"Amazing Grace"	Rod Stewart	2:02
9.	"Check Ya Self 2010" (feat. Chuck D with Lisa Kekaula)	Ice Cube	3:25
10.	"Glaucoma"	Christophe Beck	2:13
11.	"A Good Sign"	Christophe Beck	1:36
12.	"Ethan's Theme"	Christophe Beck	1:19

Additional songs

The following songs are not included in the soundtrack, but they appear in some parts of the film:

- Closing Time – Danny McBride
- Mykonos – Fleet Foxes
- Old Man (Live at Massey Hall) – Neil Young
- Hey You – Pink Floyd
- Theme from Two and a Half Men

== Release ==
=== Marketing ===
In the film, Ethan, played by Zach Galifianakis, is a huge fan of the sitcom Two and a Half Men. He mentions that he started a website called "itsrainingtwoandahalfmen.com". As a joke, a website was actually launched with the same name. Ethan is also shown in the film as guest starring in a Two and a Half Men episode. This was a special short produced for the film's use, and did not become part of an official episode of the sitcom. The short was partially shown in the film and the full short is available online.

=== Box office ===
Due Date grossed $101 million in the U.S. and Canada and $111 million in other territories for a total of $212 million worldwide, against a production budget of $65 million.

The film earned $12.2 million at the North American domestic box office on its release day and $43.5 million on its first week, placing behind Megamind but was number one in the UK for two consecutive weekends. On November 8, 2010, it went up to #1 overtaking Megamind. On November 12, it went down to #3 behind Unstoppable and Megamind. On November 15, it went up to #2 behind Unstoppable. On November 24, it went down to #8 behind Harry Potter and the Deathly Hallows – Part 1, Tangled, Burlesque, Megamind, Love & Other Drugs, Unstoppable and Faster. It closed in theaters on January 27, 2011.

=== Home media ===
Due Date was released on DVD and Blu-ray on February 22, 2011, by Warner Home Video.

=== Critical response ===
On Rotten Tomatoes Due Date holds an approval rating of 39% based on 195 reviews and an average rating of 5.20/10. The website's critics consensus reads: "Shamelessly derivative and only sporadically funny, Due Date doesn't live up to the possibilities suggested by its talented director and marvelously mismatched stars." On Metacritic the film has a weighted average score of 51 out of 100, based on 39 critics, indicating "mixed or average" reviews. Audiences polled by CinemaScore gave the film an average grade of "B−" on an A+ to F scale.

Roger Ebert of the Chicago Sun-Times gave the film two and a half stars out of a possible four, noting "The movie probably contains enough laughs to satisfy the weekend audience. Where it falls short is in the characters and relationships." Ebert compared Due Date to the 1987 film Planes, Trains and Automobiles, but bemoaned that Due Date could have learned and offered more.
