= List of Undateable episodes =

Undateable is an American multi-camera television sitcom that premiered on May 29, 2014, as a mid-season replacement on NBC. The series was created by Adam Sztykiel and is based on the book Undateable: 311 Things Guys Do that Guarantee They Won't Be Dating or Having Sex by Ellen Rakieten and Anne Coyle.

On May 13, 2016, NBC cancelled the series. During the course of the series, 36 episodes of Undateable aired over three seasons.

== Series overview ==
Season	Episodes	Originally released	
Season	Episodes	First released	Last released
1	13	May 29, 2014	July 3, 2014
2	10	March 17, 2015	May 12, 2015
3	13	October 9, 2015	January 29, 2016

== Episodes ==
=== Season 1 (2014) ===
No. overall	No. in season	Title	Directed by	Written by	Original release date	Prod. code	US viewers (millions)
1	1	"Pilot"	Scott Ellis	Adam Sztykiel	May 29, 2014	276068	3.84
Danny's current roommate is getting married and moves out, forcing him to find a new one. He meets his new candidate, a bar owner named Justin, and they hit it off. Danny tries to teach Justin the fine art of picking up women, and suggests they and Justin's friends – Burski, Shelly, and Brett – go to a wine-tasting party that Danny's sister Leslie is hosting. The move backfires when Justin brags the next day about sleeping with a woman from the party, and it turns out to be Leslie. Danny later learns from Leslie that the two literally just slept together, and no sex was had.
2	2	"Pants Buddies"	Scott Ellis	Adam Sztykiel	May 29, 2014	4X5552	3.82
Knowing that Justin has a crush on Nicki, Danny grabs Justin's phone and texts Nicki a request for a movie date. Justin suggests that Danny doesn't understand friendship, revealing that he and Burski are "pants buddies". (Justin once spilled a beverage on Burski's pants, then loaned him his own pants as a show of friendship.) Meanwhile, Danny's sage advice to Burski is that he not speak at all when trying to pick up a woman, and it actually seems to work when Burski encounters a girl from his building.
3	3	"Three's A Crowd"	Scott Ellis	Craig Doyle	June 5, 2014	4X5553	2.99
After Danny convinces Justin that he's in the "friend zone" with Nicki, Justin becomes committed to revealing his true feelings. He learns from Nicki that she is interested in being "more than friends" with someone, but the someone turns out to be Danny. To prove he is a good friend, Danny tricks Justin into announcing how he feels about Nicki, while Nicki is listening in Justin's office. After hearing Justin's passionate speech, Nicki runs out of the office to embrace him. Meanwhile, Leslie gets on Shelly's bad side after she verbally trashes Detroit.
4	4	"The Switch"	Linda Mendoza	Courtney Lilly	June 5, 2014	4X5554	2.86
After sleeping with Sabrina, Leslie's college friend who is back in town to attend a PhD program at the University of Michigan, Danny feels like he's actually made a connection with a woman. But Sabrina pulls a "Danny" on him, and evades his attempts to make a second date. In another twist, Justin, now in a committed relationship with Nicki, feels compelled to give Danny relationship advice. Elsewhere, Brett feels that his coming out has made Justin uptight about their friendship. When Justin denies this, Brett has an odd suggestion for making Justin prove it.
5	5	"The Hero is Me"	Phill Lewis	Adam Sztykiel	June 12, 2014	4X5555	3.22
Justin proclaims to Danny that he's in love with Nicki, unaware that Nicki has walked up behind him. Justin then proclaims his love to Nicki's face, but she simply responds, "Cool." Danny advises Justin to remain aloof and Nicki will come around, but that backfires. Nicki finally says "I love you" to Justin, explaining she was afraid to respond the first time because she has to leave Detroit for a while to care for her ailing mother. Meanwhile, the gang begins to notice that Burski is "accidentally" touching Leslie's body a lot lately.
6	6	"Leader of the Pack"	Ted Wass	John Quaintance	June 12, 2014	4X5556	2.97
Danny encourages Brett to ask out a hot, gay electrician named Steve who is working on the bar's lighting. When Steve says he isn't interested, Brett takes it hard. Making matters worse, Brett discovers that Justin took some pleasure in Steve's rejection because it showed Danny was wrong. Meanwhile, Leslie and Sabrina coach Justin on how to have better phone sex with the out-of-town Nicki.
7	7	"The Move"	Steve Zuckerman	Adam Sztykiel	June 19, 2014	4X5563	2.54
Nicki is back in town, so she and Justin immediately hit the bedroom. Justin expresses insecurity over being good enough for Nicki, especially with her spending so much time away from him, so he reluctantly uses a sexual "move" that Danny offered to diagram for him. Nicki is thrilled, but Justin becomes infuriated upon learning that Danny took credit for the move in a conversation with Nicki. Elsewhere, Shelly resolves to make Burski cry, after the latter proclaims he hasn't cried since he was five years old.
8	8	"The Julius Effect"	David Trainer	Jackie Clarke	June 19, 2014	4X5557	2.54
Leslie is distraught over her ex-husband Julius (Josh Hopkins) being in town to finally sign their divorce papers. Danny hides the fact that he's still hanging with Julius as a friend, which Justin opposes until Julius wins him over with his singing ability. Danny and Justin come around and decide to apologize to Leslie, only to see Julius emerge from her bedroom. Meanwhile, Shelly demonstrates a remarkable ability to control his friends' dreams.
9	9	"Low Hanging Fruit"	David Trainer	Austen Faggen	June 26, 2014	4X5558	2.63
Justin pushes Danny to take his relationship with Sabrina to a new level, causing Danny to react in a destructive yet predictable way. Moments after the two break up, Justin announces he hired Sabrina to take Nicki's position at the bar. Meanwhile, Brett needs help figuring out a good name for his man parts.
10	10	"Daddy Issues"	Ted Wass	John Quaintance	June 26, 2014	4X5561	2.45
Justin's dad (Tom Cavanagh) is in town, and Danny gets involved in their complicated relationship. Not knowing the past friction between the two, Danny's efforts only make things worse. Elsewhere, Shelly lets Sabrina know that her job is too easy to be complaining about it so much. Sabrina makes a bet that he can't handle two days at her job, which leads to hilarious consequences for Shelly.
11	11	"Let There Be Light"	Shelley Jensen	Michael Hobert	July 3, 2014	4X5559	2.24
Danny and Justin deal with their obnoxious neighbor Kevin (Rory Scovel), who shines his huge pot-growing light at all hours. Their friendship is tested when each has a different approach to solving the problem. At the bar, the gang all tries to avoid getting on Sabrina's bad side by making fun of Danny in her presence.
12	12	"Danny's Boys"	David Trainer	Heather Flanders	July 3, 2014	4X5560	2.07
After Justin reveals that the bar is barely breaking even, the gang all pitches in to pay off his remaining loan amount. But Danny takes his new status as an investor a bit too seriously and starts to make changes. Justin gets angry, but is then surprised that Danny has been able to fill the bar with patrons, albeit almost all gay men.
13	13	"Go For Gary"	Eric Dean Seaton	Laura Moran & Joel Church-Cooper	July 3, 2014	4X5562	1.99
Danny's jaw drops when a cute young woman walks up to him at the bar and asks about Justin's availability. It turns out that Justin's devotion to Nicki makes him irresistible. Justin is thrilled that Nicki is returning home to Detroit, but his elation is short-lived when she later tells him she found a job in Lansing, allowing her to stay close to her mother. She suggests they take a break, leaving Justin heartbroken. Meanwhile, the friends all look up their scores on an internet date-rating site, and are shocked to find that someone gave Burski a 9.9 score.

=== Season 2 (2015) ===
No. overall	No. in season	Title	Directed by	Written by	Original release date	Prod. code	US viewers (millions)
14	1	"A Japanese Businessman Walks Into a Bar"	Phill Lewis	Adam Sztykiel	March 17, 2015	4X5001	6.43
Justin takes on a one-night stand at the suggestion of Danny, but things quickly spiral downwards when Justin can't end it. This causes the gang to hold a "trial" to determine whether it is Danny or Justin who acts the most derogative towards women. Justin's new bartender, Candace, is easily confused by her new job, while Leslie requests the guys' help to remove a suggestive picture of her from a gym.
15	2	"Candace's Boyfriend Walks Into a Bar"	Phill Lewis	Adam Sztykiel	March 24, 2015	4X5006	5.18
Candace's boyfriend Trent hits on Leslie when Candace is out of the room, so Justin thinks it is his duty to play father figure and suggest to Candace that Trent isn't good enough for her. Candace gets mad at Justin for butting in, and turns to Danny for fatherly advice. After initially saying Candace is a big girl and staying out of it, Danny eventually gives the same advice that Justin gave. Meanwhile, Brett is distraught when his most recent date's Tweet suggests he is a lousy kisser.
16	3	"An Imaginary Torch Walks Into a Bar"	Eric Dean Seaton	Laura Moran	March 31, 2015	4X5004	4.98
Nicki returns to the bar, engaged. Justin meets her fiancee, a tech millionaire, who thanks Justin for never showing up to reconnect with Nicki – Nicki had told him that if Justin ever did show up at her home, she might have gone back to him. Danny convinces Justin that if Nicki was the love of his life, he would have left everything last summer and moved to be with her. Elsewhere, the gang playfully lists things Burski would do to get into Leslie's pants, but one of Burski's responses winds up hurting Leslie's feelings.
17	4	"A Stray Dog Walks Into a Bar"	Phill Lewis	Michael Hobert	April 14, 2015	4X5005	5.10
When he discovers that Candace is living upstairs at the bar and their neighbor Kevin is using the shower at their house, Danny tries to convince Justin that he lets people take advantage of him. Meanwhile, Candace wants to take in a stray dog but finds she has to lie about her living situation to keep it, and she's not good at lying. Danny tries to teach Justin to be more assertive while Brett tries to teach Candace the fine art of lying, before they and the gang decide they prefer their friends the way they are.
18	5	"A Priest Walks Into a Bar"	Eric Dean Seaton	Heather Flanders	April 21, 2015	4X5003	4.85
Justin thinks Danny has a talent that could translate into doing Twitter feeds for Detroit Weekly, and tries to get him to interview for a job. When Danny initially blows it off, Justin calls him a "loser". He tries to take back his words after Danny appears hurt, but Leslie convinces Justin it's better off letting Danny think he meant it, as it will motivate him. Meanwhile, Shelly discusses his midnight "dates" with a woman named Vanessa, when Candace says he is just a booty call for her. Shelly has to decide between telling Vanessa he wants more or continuing to just have sex with her.
19	6	"A Sibling Rivalry Walks Into a Bar"	Phill Lewis	Craig Doyle	April 28, 2015	4X5002	4.53
Leslie needs someone to be her date for an important dinner-dance with colleagues in her new job working for a Detroit tourism group. Both Danny and Justin offer to step up for Leslie, and Leslie chooses Justin, saying he's been more of a brother to her lately than her own brother, Danny. Meanwhile, Burski thinks he can swoop in and be a real date for Leslie, but first he needs Shelly to score him a nice (but cheap) suit.
20	7	"A Live Show Walks Into a Bar"	Phill Lewis	Adam Sztykiel	May 5, 2015	4X5009	4.21
21	8	"A Live Show Walks Into a Bar"	Phill Lewis	Adam Sztykiel	May 5, 2015	4X5010	4.21
Justin's bar becomes a major spot for a local music festival, and Danny and Justin compete with each other to date a back-up singer who is in town. The singer ends up going out with Candace's ex-boyfriend Trent, while Candace develops a crush on Justin. Shelly serves as a waiter for a few days to prove that Brett's lack of tips is due to his personality, not the stinginess of the customers, and a competition between the two ensues for who can get the most tips. Multiple guest stars make an appearance, including Ed Sheeran, Kate Walsh, Victoria Justice, Minnie Driver, Drew Pinsky and several actors from Scrubs (Zach Braff, Donald Faison, Christa Miller, Scott Foley and Neil Flynn).
22	9	"An Angry Judge Walks Into a Bar"	Phill Lewis	Austen Faggen	May 12, 2015	4X5007	4.01
Justin has been dating a woman named Lauren for only two weeks, and now has to take the next step – meeting her protective father who raised her as a single dad. Meanwhile, Candace watches from a distance and finally admits to Danny and the gang that she is smitten with Justin.
23	10	"Cop Number Four Walks Into a Bar"	Phill Lewis	Joel Church-Cooper	May 12, 2015	4X5008	4.01
Needing a place of her own, Candace enters a local "hand on a house" contest organized by Leslie, where the last contestant touching a house wins it. She is then annoyed when her ex Trent is also there, so Justin offers to join the contest, which makes Candace uncomfortable. Danny takes Justin's place and wins the house for Candace. Meanwhile, Brett is visited by an old pal from England, and the gang realizes he's never told anyone in his hometown that he's gay.

=== Season 3 (2015–16) ===
No. overall	No. in season	Title	Directed by	Written by	Original release date	Prod. code	US viewers (millions)
24	1	"A Will They Walks Into a Bar"	Phill Lewis	Adam Sztykiel	October 9, 2015	4X7151	2.54
(Part 1) Justin and Candace announce they are going to start dating. Brett, Leslie and even Burski have significant others now, while Shelly hooks up with an extremely tall woman at the bar. Justin makes fun of Danny being the only member of the group who is now alone. Danny retaliates by suggesting Candace has more to lose if she and Justin break up, because Justin will still have all his friends. This causes Candace to back away from Justin and rethink their situation. Musical Guest: Nico & Vinz
25	2	"A Won't They Walks Into a Bar"	Phill Lewis	Adam Sztykiel	October 9, 2015	4X7152	2.54
(Part 2) The gang learns that Burski only landed his current date by pretending to be blind. As Danny did with Justin, Leslie sabotages Burski's relationship by flashing her breasts, which reveals Burski can see just fine. She later apologizes, telling Burski his constant attention to her looks makes her feel good about herself, and that seeing him with another woman made her a bit jealous. Burski insists any woman he is with right now is only practice for the day when he will win Leslie's affection. Meanwhile, Danny sort of apologizes to Justin for breaking up Candace and him, and helps push the two back together. Musical Guest: Nico & Vinz
26	3	"A Rock and Hard Place Walk Into a Bar"	Phill Lewis	Allison Bosma & Jon DeWalt	October 16, 2015	4X7153	3.13
Candace and Justin walk in on Danny as he prepares to have sex with a woman he just met. Candace engages the woman in conversation, which embarrasses Danny and causes the woman to walk out. Danny is furious with Candace, and tries to put Justin in the middle of their argument. Justin is about to side with Candace when Danny, for the first time, says Justin is his best friend. Conflicted, Justin retreats to his office, and can only be coaxed out with a Grease sing-along. Musical Guest: Kodaline
27	4	"A Truth Hug Walks Into a Bar"	Phill Lewis	Christopher Luccy	October 23, 2015	4X7154	2.58
In order to help out his mom, Shelly has to quit his job, move out of his place, and temporarily live with Danny and Justin. Justin wants to offer the upstairs loft at the bar to Shelly as a more permanent home, but Danny says Shelly will be too proud to accept charity. Justin makes up a story about the bar being robbed and needing someone there at night, and gets the gang to go along with it. Shelly suspects something is fishy, and he uses his "truth hugs" to extract the real story. Musical Guest: Saint Motel
28	5	"Halloween Walks Into a Bar"	Phill Lewis	Craig Doyle	October 30, 2015	4X7155	2.60
Danny and the gang suspect that Candace is getting annoyed with Justin's nonstop romantic gestures, but is afraid to tell him. Danny is able to coax a confession from her while Justin is in costume, listening nearby. Justin worries that Candace no longer likes the "real" him, but advice from Leslie helps save the relationship. In the end, Candace says "I love you" to Justin for the first time, and Justin responds in kind. Musical Guest: Meghan Trainor
29	6	"A Puppet Walks Into a Bar"	Marty Pasetta Jr.	Michael Hobert	November 6, 2015	4X7156	2.64
The gang all learns that Mike (played by Bianca Kajlich's real-life husband Mike Catherwood) is going to propose to Leslie. Danny is tasked with keeping Leslie distracted, only to hear his sister say she thinks Mike is way more serious about their relationship than she is. Danny then leaks the secret about the ring, making Leslie angry. Musical Guest: American Authors
30	7	"An Origin Story Walks Into a Bar"	Phill Lewis	Amy Pocha & Seth Cohen	November 20, 2015 (Note: The seventh episode of the season was scheduled for November 13, but was cancelled in the wake of the terrorist attacks in Paris that occurred that same day. NBC rescheduled the episode for the week after.)	4X7157	2.72
Jackie (Christa Miller), the older woman to whom Danny lost his virginity when he was 17, is returning to town. While Danny assures his friends that Jackie can no longer control him like she did when he was younger, it quickly becomes clear that she can still get him to do whatever she wants. Musical Guest: Alessia Cara
31	8	"A Bachelorette Party Walks Into a Bar"	Phill Lewis	Austen Faggen	December 4, 2015	4X7158	2.86
Danny gets mad when Justin plans to set him up with an old high school acquaintance, only to find out that it's Charlotte (Whitney Cummings), a bridesmaid he just hit on from the bachelorette party in the bar. Meanwhile, Brett meets the "gay male friend" at the bachelorette party and sleeps with him, but he later learns the man is the groom. Musical Guest: Andrew McMahon
32	9	"A Box of Puppies Walks Into a Bar"	Phill Lewis	Joel Church-Cooper	December 11, 2015	4X7159	2.74
Candace's dog is accused of fathering a litter of puppies, and she is being pressured to pay $1,200 in "puppy support". Justin vows to get DNA from a puppy to prove Candace's dog is not the father, only to learn the owner of the mom dog is a large, scary man who runs a home for recently released prisoners. Elsewhere, Burski and Leslie have differing views on what their kiss in the previous episode might have meant, while Shelly announces he's hosting a holiday party only to find that all of his friends are heading elsewehere. Musical Guest: The cast of Undateable
33	10	"A New Year's Resolution Walks Into a Bar"	Phill Lewis	Laura Moran	January 8, 2016	4X7160	3.15
Danny is distraught and confused when Charlotte rates him only a 6 out of 10 in the bedroom. After Charlotte explains that Danny is great at sex but not so good at "making love", Justin resolves to teach his friend about intimacy. Meanwhile, Candace gets advice from both Charlotte and Leslie on how to act sexier for Justin. Musical Guest: Charlie Puth
34	11	"Danny's Boyz Walk Into a Bar"	Phill Lewis	Ryan Kemp	January 15, 2016	4X7161	2.75
Brett is preparing to take the U.S. citizenship test, but loses his lucky American flag sweater that his mother knit for him. When Danny and Justin find a street dancer wearing the sweater, they try to win it back by having the bar crew (as "Danny's Boyz") challenge the performer and his crew to a dance-off. Meanwhile, Burski wants Danny to prove his friendship by helping him find the perfect birthday gift for Leslie. Musical Guest: Weezer
35	12	"The Backstreet Boys Walk Into a Bar"	Phill Lewis	Matthew Hausfater	January 29, 2016	4X7162	2.73
36	13	"The Backstreet Boys Walk Into a Bar"	Phill Lewis	Adam Sztykiel	January 29, 2016	4X7163	2.73
Justin proposes to Candace and she accepts. Justin says he'll be moving in with Candace, making Danny upset, as this is exactly what happened with his former roommate at the start of the series. Justin assures Danny they will remain friends, and Danny eventually proves he's happy for them by helping Candace retrieve her grandmother's ring from Trent. Meanwhile, Leslie seems embarrassed to admit that she and Burski have now gone on multiple dates. When Burski can't keep quiet about it anymore, Leslie finally shows the group that she's enjoying her time with Burski by giving him a long, passionate kiss. Musical Guest: Backstreet Boys
