= Rene Gube =

American comedian, actor and writer

- Occupations: Comedian, actor, writer, producer
- Years active: 2010–present
- Spouse: Briga Heelan (m. 2015)
- Children: 2

Rene Gube (/ˈɡuːbeɪ/ GOO-bay) is an American comedian, actor and writer. He played Threepeat on the TBS sitcom Ground Floor, and was executive story editor and a writer for the CW show Crazy Ex-Girlfriend where he also had a recurring role as "Father Brah". He is an executive producer, writer and guest star on the FX series The Bear.

== Early life ==
Gube grew up in Rancho Peñasquitos, San Diego. He is Filipino.

He got his taste of comedy while at Mount Carmel High School where he joined a speech and debate club.

== Career ==
Prior to his career as a comedian, Gube used to be a high school teacher. When in Los Angeles, Gube formed a comedy sketch group, Touchblue, with his friends. Their sketches got quite popular which allowed him to perform on various stages throughout California.

Gube frequently performs with the Upright Citizens Brigade, where he studied. He served as supervising producer and writer for Crazy Ex-Girlfriend, in which he also recurred as laid-back Catholic priest Father Brah.

== Personal life ==
Gube married his Ground Floor co-star Briga Heelan on May 8, 2015. They have two daughters.

== Filmography ==
Film
Year	Title	Role	Notes
2010	Surprise Party	Passive Aggressive Coffee Drinker	
2012	Cop-Puter		Short
2012	Seeking a Friend for the End of the World	Cell-Mate	
2013	If We Dated	Patrick	Short
2023	Your Place or Mine	Sidney	
TBA	Underground Comedy	Himself	Documentary; Post-production

Television
Year	Title	Role	Notes
2011	Community	Randall	Episode: "Advanced Gay"
2012	Are You There, Chelsea?	Judge	Episode: "Boots"
2012	The Newsroom	Mike	Episode: "I'll Try to Fix You"
2012	Up All Night	Bryce	Episode: "Home/Office"
2013	The Office	Athlead Male Receptionist	Episode: "Suit Warehouse"
2013	Ben and Kate	Michael	2 episodes
2013	Comedy Bang! Bang!	Husband	Episode: "Gillian Jacobs Wears a Red Dress with Sail Boats"
2013–2015	Ground Floor	Mike "Threepeat" Wen	Main cast, 20 episodes
2014	Growing Up Fisher	Postman	Episode: "Trust Fall"
2015	Undateable	Parker	Episode: "An Imaginary Torch Walks Into a Bar"
2015–2019	Crazy Ex-Girlfriend	Father Brah	Recurring role, 15 episodes
2018	Camping	Braylen	2 episodes
2021	Superstore	Warren	Episode: "The Trough"
2022	American Dad!	(voice)	Episode: "Smooshed: A Love Story"
2023-2025	The Bear	Rene/Ever GM	Recurring role, 7 episodes

Web
Year	Title	Role	Notes
2012–2014	CollegeHumor	Various	2 episodes

Writer
Year	Title	Role	Notes
2012	Men at Work	Staff writer	9 episodes
2012	Up All Night	Writer	Episode: "Thanksgiving"
2013–2015	Ground Floor	Story editor Writer	2 episodes 1 episode: "If I Were a Rich Man"
2015–2019	Crazy Ex-Girlfriend	Executive story editor Writer	11 episodes 4 episodes: "My First Thanksgiving with Josh!"; "Paula Needs to Get Over Josh!"; "When Will Josh See How Cool I Am?"; "Nathaniel and I Are Just Friends!"
2018–2020	Brockmire	Writer	2 episodes
2019–2021	Superstore	Writer	4 episodes
2022–2023	The Bear	Writer	2 episodes
2025	Going Dutch	Writer	Episode: "Nazi Hunters"

Producer
Year	Title	Role	Notes
2014–2015	Ground Floor	Consulting producer	
2016–2019	Crazy Ex-Girlfriend	Supervising producer/producer/co-producer	
2019–2021	Superstore	Co-executive producer	
2022–2023	The Bear	Co-executive producer	
2025	Going Dutch	Co-executive producer	

== Awards and nominations ==
Year	Television	Category	Status
2023	The Bear	Outstanding Comedy Series	Won
