= Adam Sztykiel =

American screenwriter

- Born: Adam John Sztykiel; Detroit, Michigan, U.S.
- Occupations: Television producer Film producer Television writer Screenwriter
- Years active: 2000–present
- Known for: Undateable

Adam John Sztykiel is an American television and film producer and screenwriter known for such television series and films as Undateable, which he also created based on the book Undateable: 311 Things Guys Do That Guarantee They Won't Be Dating or Having Sex by Ellen Rakieten and Anne Coyle, Due Date, and Made of Honor.

== Early life ==
Sztykiel was born in Detroit, Michigan. His 2014 series Undateable is set in Ferndale, Michigan, a suburb on the northern border of Detroit.

In 2000, he graduated from University of Southern California.

== Career ==
Sztykiel made his screenwriting debut with the 2008 romantic comedy film Made of Honor. After writing other films, his writing for television started under the mentorship of long-time sitcom writer and producer Bill Lawrence, who was executive producer of Undateable (2014–2016), which Sztykiel had created. Undateable is a notable project in that in the third season all thirteen episodes were recorded live. Each live episode was recorded twice, one taping airing live on the east coast, and a second live taping for the west coast. Sztykiel noted that between the east coast and west coasting airings he would be rewriting the script for the next broadcast.

In 2018, Sztykiel and his wife, podcaster Ellie Knaus, sold a comedy to ABC entitled Because Kids. The comedy was inspired by Knaus' podcast Atomic Moms. The series did not move beyond the development stage, Sztykiel and Knaus reunited creatively when they developed a feature in 2024.

In 2020, Sztykiel was hired to write and executive produce the film Scoob! from Warner Brothers. Two years later, in 2022, he was hired to write an early draft for the superhero film Black Adam. Neither of these films were received well by critics, with both films falling below 50% approval from critics on Rotten Tomatoes.

In February 2022, it was announced that Sztykiel would be making his directorial debut with a script he wrote for the HBO Max live-action superhero film Wonder Twins, based on the DC Comics characters of the same name; in May 2022, just weeks before the July start of filming, HBO Max owner Warner Bros. Discovery cancelled the project. In April 2024, it was announced that he would be making his directorial debut with a comedy film. He would also once again team up with his wife to co-write the film. The film was called Let's Have Kids! and was released digitally in October 2026.

== Filmography ==
Key
†	Denotes films that have not yet been released

Film

Year	Title	Director	Writer	Producer
2008	Made of Honor	No	Yes	No
2010	Due Date	No	Yes	No
2015	Alvin and the Chipmunks: The Road Chip	No	Yes	No
2017	Diary of a Wimpy Kid: The Long Haul	No	Uncredited	No
2018	Rampage	No	Yes	No
2020	Scoob!	No	Yes	Executive
2022	Black Adam	No	Yes	No
2023	Family Switch	No	Yes	No
2026	Let's Have Kids!	Yes	Yes	Yes

TV series

Year	Title	Writer	Executive Producer	Creator	Notes
2014–2016	Undateable	Yes	Yes	Yes	
2019	Whiskey Cavalier	Yes	No	No	Episode "The Czech List"
2024	Bad Monkey	Yes	Consulting	No	
