= Izzy G. =

American actress (born 2008)

- Born: Isabella Gaspersz; August 5, 2008 (age 18); Los Angeles, California
- Occupation: Actress
- Years active: 2014–present

Isabella Gaspersz (born August 5, 2008), known professionally as Izzy G, is an American actress known for her work on AJ and the Queen and B Positive.

== Early life and career ==
Izzy G. is the daughter of actress Sabrina Gennarino and producer / director Pieter Gaspersz. Gaspersz appeared on Jimmy Kimmel Live! with guest host RuPaul in August 2021.

== Filmography ==
- After (2014) - Baby Chloe
- Death of an Umbrella Salesman (2018) - Mean Girl
- Wings (2018) - Little Girl
- The Highwaymen (2019) - Little Mudlark Girl
- A Violent Separation (2019) - Young Frances
- AJ and the Queen (2020) - AJ Douglas
- B Positive (2020–2022) - Madeline "Maddie" Dunbar
- Under the Bridge (2024) - Kelly Ellard
