= Ground Floor =

American sitcom

- Title card
- Genre: Sitcom
- Created by: Bill Lawrence; Greg Malins
- Starring: Skylar Astin; Briga Heelan; Rory Scovel; Rene Gube; James Earl; Alexis Knapp; John C. McGinley; Emily Heller
- Composer: Gregg Lehrman
- Country of origin: United States
- Original language: English
- No. of seasons: 2
- No. of episodes: 20

Production
- Executive producers: Bill Lawrence; Jeff Astrof; Jeff Ingold
- Camera setup: Multi-camera
- Running time: 30 minutes
- Production companies: Doozer Productions; Warner Horizon Television

Original release
- Network: TBS
- Release: November 14, 2013 – February 10, 2015

Ground Floor is an American sitcom created by Bill Lawrence and Greg Malins, that aired on TBS for two seasons, from November 14, 2013, through February 10, 2015. The series stars Skylar Astin, Briga Heelan, Rory Scovel and John C. McGinley and follows Brody, a successful banker who falls for Jenny, an intelligent maintenance supervisor who works in the same building.

Following earlier reports, the show was cancelled on February 13, 2015.

== Synopsis ==
Ground Floor follows Brody (Skylar Astin), a young and successful banker at Remington Trust, who after a one-night stand with Jenny (Briga Heelan) discovers that she works in maintenance for his building. From there, they deal with their growing feelings for each other, much to the annoyance of their co-workers, while trying to find a balance between their vastly different work environments.

== Cast ==
- Skylar Astin as Brody Carol Moyer
- Briga Heelan as Jenny Miller
- Rory Scovel as Mark "Harvard" Shrake
- Rene Gube as Mike "Threepeat" Wen
- James Earl as Derrick Dupree
- Alexis Knapp as Tori (season 1)
- John C. McGinley as Remington Stewart Mansfield
- Emily Heller as Lindsay Harris (season 2)

=== Recurring ===
- Anna Camp as Heather

== Development and production ==
TBS ordered a pilot for Ground Floor on February 21, 2013. The series was created by Bill Lawrence and Greg Malins, with Lawrence serving as executive producer alongside Jeff Astrof and Jeff Ingold, and the production companies Warner Bros. Television and Doozer.

Casting began in February 2013, with John C. McGinley cast as Mr. Mansfield, the boss. Skylar Astin and Briga Heelan then joined the cast in the two lead roles, with Astin playing Brody, a Harvard graduate and money manager who falls for Heelan's Jennifer, an intelligent maintenance worker. The next to be cast were Rene Gube and James Earl, with Gube in the role of Threepeat, a money manager, and Earl playing Derrick, a laid-back guy who works with Jennifer on the ground floor. Rory Scovel joined the series as "Harvard", a classic know-it-all who harbors an overt crush on his ground-floor co-worker Jennifer. Alexis Knapp was the final actor cast, appearing in the first season as Tori, a sexy co-worker of Jennifer's who hits the clubs at night and catches up on her sleep at work. Knapp and Astin had previously worked together in the comedy Pitch Perfect.

On May 10, 2013, TBS placed a series order on Ground Floor, which premiered on November 14, 2013.

On March 6, 2014, Ground Floor was renewed for a second season, which premiered December 9, 2014 and consisted of ten episodes.

== Series overview ==
Season	Episodes	Originally released	
Season	Episodes	First released	Last released
1	10	November 14, 2013	January 16, 2014
2	10	December 9, 2014	February 10, 2015

== Episodes ==
=== Season 1 (2013–14) ===
No. overall	No. in season	Title	Directed by	Written by	Original release date	Prod. code	U.S. viewers (millions)
1	1	"Pilot"	Gail Mancuso	Greg Malins & Bill Lawrence	November 14, 2013	296030	1.63
Brody and Jenny, employees who respectively work on the top and ground floor of a skyscraper, meet and begin to see each other, against the advice of their coworkers.
2	2	"Off to the Races"	Gail Mancuso	Jeff Astrof	November 14, 2013	2M6452	1.20
Brody attempts to alter his relationship with Jenny, while she prefers things as they are. Harvard takes Mansfield's chair to use in a race against Derrick.
3	3	"The New Office"	Gail Mancuso	Jason Belleville	November 21, 2013	2M6453	1.42
Brody competes against his coworkers for an office, to Jenny's disgust. Harvard unwittingly dates Mansfield's daughter when she comes to visit.
4	4	"The Gift"	Gail Mancuso	Bill Martin & Mike Schiff	December 5, 2013	2M6454	1.26
Jenny insists Brody's expensive birthday gift to her is thoughtless and resists keeping it.
5	5	"Take Me Out to the Ballgame"	Gail Mancuso	Jeff Astrof	December 12, 2013	2M6456	1.52
When Jenny and Mansfield each invite Brody to the same baseball game on his day off, Brody has to make a choice: to sit with Mansfield or his girlfriend. Meanwhile Threepeat jockeys for position with Mansfield, and Harvard ends up out of his element in the wonderland that is the company luxury suite.
6	6	"If I Were a Rich Man"	Gail Mancuso	Joel Church-Cooper & Rene Gube	December 19, 2013	2M6457	1.70
Brody and Threepeat are tasked with delivering bad news to clients. Jenny convinces Harvard, Tori, and Derrick to invest their money. John McEnroe guest starred.
7	7	"Woman on Top"	Gail Mancuso	Bill Martin & Mike Schiff	December 26, 2013	2M6455	1.62
When Brody's ex-girlfriend (Anna Camp) from business school comes back into the picture, Jenny's worried that Heather's a better match for Brody
8	8	"Dynamic Duo"	Gail Mancuso	Jason Belleville	January 2, 2014	2M6458	1.52
When Mansfield's assistant falls ill, Jenny fills in only to end up nursing Mansfield when he falls ill, leaving Brody to handle a big client meeting solo. Meanwhile, Harvard takes over for Jenny and ends up fending off Threepeat and the other execs while issuing new phones.
9	9	"The Decision: Part One"	Gail Mancuso	Jenny Lee	January 9, 2014	2M6459	1.59
Jenny plans to go on a trip to Paris without Brody. Brody's attempts to profess his love to Jenny are repeatedly interrupted by others doing the same. Lies catch up with Threepeat as the skills on his application are tested.
10	10	"The Decision: Part Two"	Gail Mancuso	Jeff Astrof & Bill Martin & Mike Schiff	January 16, 2014	2M6460	1.33
Brody has to decide upon going to Hong Kong or Paris with Jenny. Threepeat needs a place to stay and winds up crashing with Harvard.

=== Season 2 (2014–15) ===
No. overall	No. in season	Title	Directed by	Written by	Original release date	Prod. code	U.S. viewers (millions)
11	1	"Unforgiven"	Gail Mancuso	Jeff Astrof	December 9, 2014	2M6751	1.35
Brody and Jenny return from Paris, with both of them dealing with the consequences. Brody meets his replacement, Lindsay, as he tries to get his job back.
12	2	"Baked and Toasted"	Phill Lewis	Bill Martin & Mike Schiff	December 16, 2014	2M6752	1.43
Brody tries to impress Mansfeld to get his job back by working on the ground floor. With him now working on the ground floor, Harvard and Derrick notice his work ethic. Jenny learns she went to high school with Lindsay.
13	3	"Space Invader"	Jody Margolin Hahn	Jason Belleville	December 23, 2014	2M6753	1.28
When Brody gets his first ground floor paycheck he gets the sticker shock of his life. In an effort to downsize, he gives up his apartment and crashes with Jenny. But when crashing feels a lot like living together, Jenny freaks out. Normally Brody would turn to Mansfield for advice, but his boss has made it clear that this time he is on his own. Harvard and Derrick bet they know how to stretch their modest ground floor pay further than Brody.
14	4	"The Break-ups"	Jody Margolin Hahn	Cindy Caponera	December 30, 2014	2M6754	1.71
When a rival starts poaching Mansfield's top guys, Brody thinks Mansfield will finally give him his job back, but when Mansfield makes it clear things can never be what they were, Brody has to make a big change. At Derrick's urging, Jenny has to 'break-up' with Harvard - who she's never dated - so he'll finally move on and pursue other women, like the clearly interested Lindsay. Meanwhile Threepeat has a hard time accepting the fact that this rival has tried to poach everyone but him.
15	5	"Mano-a-Mansfield"	Steve Zuckerman	Joel Church-Cooper	January 6, 2015	2M6755	1.43
After one too many problems, Brody begins his new job at Mansfield's rival. However he is upset to learn that his first assignment is to take down Mansfield's company. Jenny and Derrick introduce Harvard to online dating which backfires.
16	6	"Love and Basketball"	Phill Lewis	Laura Moran	January 13, 2015	2M6756	1.42
Mansfield's annual basketball tournament is held with Jenny competing against Brody. Lindsay and Harvard are tricked onto their first date.
17	7	"Wicked Wedding"	Robbie Countryman	Jeff Astrof	January 20, 2015	2M6757	1.59
To get Jenny interested in marriage, he takes her multiple times to see Wicked. Threepeat helps Mrs. Mansfield plan their daughter's wedding. Derrick convinces Harvard that he is acting crazy by taking things too fast with Lindsay.
18	8	"The Mansfield Who Came to Dinner"	Phill Lewis	Bill Martin & Mike Schiff	January 27, 2015	2M6758	1.67
After Mansfield helps pay for Jenny to go to college, she wants to thank him by inviting him to her apartment for dinner. Lindsay and Harvard have a fight as Threepeat is put in charge of being a financial correspondent in Mansfield's place. To stop his nerves, Derrick helps him out.
19	9	"The Proposal – Part I"	Eric Dean Seaton	Jason Belleville	February 3, 2015	2M6759	1.34
Heather returns around the time of Brody's birthday and ruins Jenny's gift. Lindsay is put in charge of helping Mansfield and his daughter's wedding so they all go to Las Vegas. Mansfield asks Brody to hold onto his daughter's wedding ring which Jenny later finds in his suitcase.
20	10	"The Proposal – Part II"	Gail Mancuso	Jeff Astrof & Bill Martin & Mike Schiff	February 10, 2015	2M6760	1.42
After Jenny finds Mr. Mansfield's daughter's wedding ring in Brody's luggage, she assumes he was going to propose and freaks out. Meanwhile Lindsay and Harvard spend all their winnings and Threepeat sleeps with Heather.

== Ratings ==
Prior to its second season renewal, the first season averaged 1.8 million viewers in Live + 7 delivery, including 1.1 million adults 18-49 and 575,000 adults 18–34.
