= Skylar Astin =

American actor (born 1987)

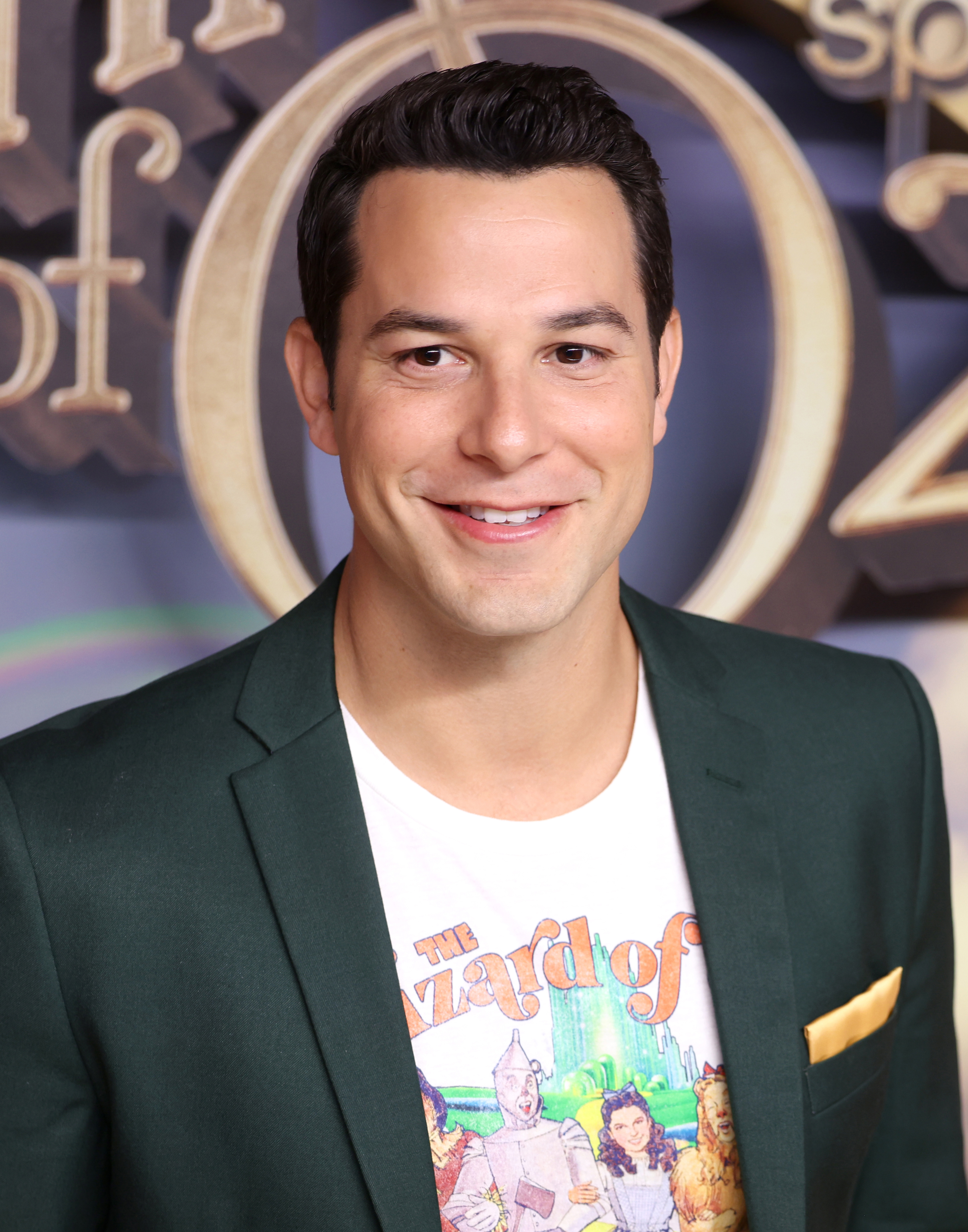
- Astin in 2025
- Born: Skylar Astin Lipstein; September 23, 1987 (age 39); New York City, US
- Occupations: Actor, singer
- Years active: 2006–present
- Spouse: Anna Camp (m. 2016; div. 2019)

Skylar Astin Lipstein (born September 23, 1987) is an American actor and singer, known for portraying Jesse Swanson in the musical films Pitch Perfect (2012) and Pitch Perfect 2 (2015). He originated the role of Georg in the Broadway musical Spring Awakening, and has since appeared in films such as Hamlet 2 (2008), Taking Woodstock (2009), Cavemen (2013), and 21 & Over (2013). He played the role of Greg Serrano on the last season of Crazy Ex-Girlfriend, a role originally played by Santino Fontana, and Max in the musical dramedy Zoey's Extraordinary Playlist (2020). He played the eponymous role of Todd in the television drama So Help Me Todd, which premiered in September 2022 and concluded on May 16, 2024.

== Early life and education ==
Astin was born in New York City, the son of Meryl and Barry Lipstein, a garment industry executive. He is Jewish and has a sister, Brielle, and two brothers, Milan and Jace. Growing up in New City, New York, he graduated from Clarkstown High School North and attended Stagedoor Manor performing arts summer camp. He was also a student at the Tisch School of the Arts at New York University, but he took a leave of absence when cast in Spring Awakening. Lipstein says that when he was 15, his agent suggested he use his middle name, Astin, instead of his surname as his stage last name to be "less specific to one thing" and that he is not embarrassed or ashamed of his decision.

== Career ==
Astin's first professional role was a minor role in the original Off-Broadway and Broadway cast of Spring Awakening as Georg, a male student with a crush on his piano teacher. He had short solos in multiple songs, but the character is noted for his belting in the song "Touch Me". During his run as Georg, Astin filmed the role Rand Posin in the film Hamlet 2. He sang "Raped in the Face" on the soundtrack with Phoebe Strole, a Spring Awakening castmate, and his co-star in the film, and the film's star, Steve Coogan. Screenings of the film at the 2008 Sundance Film Festival led to Astin signing on with United Talent Agency.

Astin joined the cast of the 2009 Adam Carolla sitcom pilot Ace in the Hole on CBS. However, the show was not picked up by the network.

In 2010, Astin took on the role of Mark Cohen in a production of Rent, directed by Neil Patrick Harris, at the Hollywood Bowl. The cast included Aaron Tveit and Vanessa Hudgens. Also in 2010, he joined the cast of the Jere Burns sitcom Strange Brew on Fox, which like Ace in the Hole was not picked up.

Astin guest-starred as Ben in the July 2011 episode of Love Bites titled "Boys to Men" and, as Matt Kornstein, in the May 2012 episode of Girls entitled "Hannah's Diary". He also played a patient on House in season 8, episode 21 in May 2012.

In 2012, Astin found his breakthrough starring in the comedy film Pitch Perfect (2012), as Jesse Swanson, and reprised the role in the 2015 sequel Pitch Perfect 2. Astin also starred in the comedy film 21 and Over (2013) as Casey.

Astin also starred in the TBS sitcom Ground Floor as Brody Moyer, a young ambitious money manager who falls for a girl on the ground floor. He also led an NBA comedy pilot on ABC.

In 2019, Astin played the Baker in the Hollywood Bowl production of Into the Woods.

He starred in the musical dramedy Zoey's Extraordinary Playlist as Zoey's best friend Max. In March 2022, it was announced that he would have a recurring role in the eighteenth season of the ABC medical drama Grey's Anatomy as Todd Eames.

On December 21, 2023, Astin performed "Put On a Happy Face" from the 1960 play Bye Bye Birdie on the primetime CBS special Dick Van Dyke: 98 Years of Magic, honoring actor Dick Van Dyke.

== Personal life ==
In 2006, Astin began dating Lauren Pritchard. He then began dating Pitch Perfect co-star Anna Camp in 2013. The couple were reported to be engaged in January 2016. They married on September 10, 2016. On April 19, 2019, the couple announced that they were filing for divorce. In late August 2019, the divorce was finalized.

== Discography ==
=== Singles ===
Year	Title	Album
2021	"Without You"	TBA
2021	"When You're Not There"	TBA
2022	"Chills"	TBA
2022	"Something in the Air" (with burnboy)	TBA
2022	"I Wanna Dance with You"	TBA
2022	"Helium"	TBA
2022	"Save My Words"	TBA
2022	"Enemy"	TBA
2023	"Gravity" (with Valerie Broussard)	TBA
2023	"EASY"	TBA

== Filmography ==
=== Film ===
Year	Title	Role	Notes
2008	Hamlet 2	Rand Posin	
2009	Taking Woodstock	John P. Roberts	
2012	Love Written in Blood	Henderson	
2012	Pitch Perfect	Jesse Swanson	
2012	Wreck-It Ralph	Roy (voice)	
2013	21 & Over	Casey Altman	
2014	Cavemen	Dean Parker	
2015	Pitch Perfect 2	Jesse Swanson	
2016	Monkey Up	Monty (voice)	
2016	Flock of Dudes	David	
2017	Speech & Debate	Walter Healy	
2018	Hot Air	Gareth Whitely	
2020	Ghosts of War	Eugene	
2020	Secret Society of Second-Born Royals	Professor James Morrow	
2021	Zoey's Extraordinary Christmas	Max Richman	
2026	F*ck Valentine's Day	Andrew	
2026	Street Smart	Trevor	

=== Television ===
Year	Title	Role	Notes
2011	Love Bites	Ben	Episode: "Boys to Men"
2012	Girls	Matt Kornstein	Episode: "Hannah's Diary"
2012	House	Derrick	Episode: "Holding On"
2013–2015	Ground Floor	Brody Moyer	Main role (20 episodes)
2014	Glee	Jean Baptiste	Episode: "City of Angels"
2015	Halt and Catch Fire	Jessie Evans	3 episodes
2015	Comedy Bang! Bang!	Himself	Episode: "Skylar Astin Wears Blue Jeans and Weathered Brown Desert Boots"
2016–2017	Graves	Isaiah Miller	Main role (20 episodes)
2017	Lip Sync Battle	Himself	Episode: "Skylar Astin vs. Metta World Peace"
2018–2019	Trolls: The Beat Goes On!	Branch (voice)	Main role (48 episodes)
2018–2019	Crazy Ex-Girlfriend	Greg Serrano	Main role (10 episodes)
2019	Vampirina	Frankenstein (voice)	Episode: "Franken-Wedding"
2020	Match Game	Himself	Episode: "Joel McHale, Jane Krakowski, Jermaine Fowler, Caroline Rhea, Skylar Astin, Retta"
2020–2021	Zoey's Extraordinary Playlist	Max Richman	Main role (25 episodes)
2020–2022	Trolls: TrollsTopia	Branch (voice)	Main role (23 episodes)
2022	Grey's Anatomy	Todd Eames	4 episodes
2022–2024	So Help Me Todd	Todd Wright	Main role (31 episodes)
2024	American Dad!	Pastor (voice)	Episode: "An Adult Woman"

=== Web ===
Year	Title	Role	Notes
2011	The Online Gamer	Mikey	3 episodes

== Stage ==
Year	Title	Role	Notes
2006–2008	Spring Awakening	Georg Zirschnitz	Broadway
2010	Rent	Mark Cohen	Hollywood Bowl
2016	West Side Story	Tony	Carnegie Hall
2016	God Bless You, Mr. Rosewater	Norman Mushari	New York City Center Encores! Off-Center
2017	What We're Up Against	Weber	WP Theater McGinn/Cazale Theater
2018	How To Succeed in Business Without Really Trying	J. Pierrepont Finch	Kennedy Center
2019	Into the Woods	The Baker	Hollywood Bowl
2021	Spring Awakening	Georg Zirschnitz	Broadway Concert
2022	Little Shop of Horrors	Seymour Krelborn	Off-Broadway
2023	Gutenberg! The Musical!	The Producer (cameo)	Broadway
2026	Cabaret	Emcee	West End

== Other productions ==
- We Chose to Go to the Moon (2026)
