= Crazy Ex-Girlfriend season 1 =

Crazy Ex-Girlfriend
- Season 1
- Promotional poster
- Starring: Rachel Bloom; Vincent Rodriguez III; Santino Fontana; Donna Lynne Champlin; Pete Gardner; Vella Lovell
- No. of episodes: 18

Release
- Original network: The CW
- Original release: October 12, 2015 – April 18, 2016

Season chronology
- Next → Season 2

The first season of Crazy Ex-Girlfriend premiered on The CW on October 12, 2015 and ran for 18 episodes until April 18, 2016. The season stars Rachel Bloom as Rebecca Bunch, a young lawyer who quits her job at a top-notch New York lawfirm and moves across the country to West Covina, California to follow an ex-boyfriend from her teenage years, Josh Chan, in the hopes of finding true happiness. Vincent Rodriguez III, Santino Fontana, Donna Lynne Champlin, Pete Gardner, and Vella Lovell co-star.

== Cast ==
=== Main ===
- Rachel Bloom as Rebecca Bunch
- Vincent Rodriguez III as Josh Chan
- Santino Fontana as Greg Serrano
- Donna Lynne Champlin as Paula Proctor
- Pete Gardner as Darryl Whitefeather
- Vella Lovell as Heather Davis

=== Recurring ===
- Gabrielle Ruiz as Valencia Perez
- David Hull as White Josh
- Erick Lopez as Hector
- Gina Gallego as Mrs. Hernandez
- Steve Monroe as Scott Proctor
- Zayne Emory, and Steele Stebbins as Brendan and Tommy Proctor
- Rene Gube as Father Brah
- Tovah Feldshuh as Naomi Bunch
- Ava Acres as Young Rebecca
- Amy Hill and Alberto Issac as Lourdes and Joseph Chan
- Michael Hyatt as Dr. Noelle Akopian
- Michael McMillian as Tim
- Paul Welsh as Trent Maddock
- Stephnie Weir as Karen and Burl Moseley as Jim
- John Allen Nelson and Jay Huguley as Silas Bunch
- Robin Thomas as Marco Serrano
- Esther Povitsky as Maya
- Danny Jolles as George
- Rachel Grate as Audra Levine
- Tess Paras and Coryn Mabalot as Jayma and Jastenity Chan
- Benjamin Siemon as Brody, "Grocery Clerk with Half an Eyelid"
- Hunter Stiebel as Marty
- Michael Hitchcock as Bert
- Cedric Yarbrough as Calvin Young
- John Yuan and Matthew Yuan as Ben and David
- Clark Moore as AJ

=== Guest ===
- Olivia Edward as Madison Whitefeather
- Eugene Cordero as Alex
- Dan Gregor as Dr. Roth
- Dr. Phil as himself
- Amber Riley and Ricki Lake as the Dream Ghosts
- BJ Novak as himself
- Lea Salonga as Aunt Myrna
- Nipsey Hussle as himself

== Episodes ==
Every song listed is performed by Rebecca, except where indicated.

No. overall	No. in season	Title	Directed by	Written by	Original release date	US viewers (millions)
1	1	"Josh Just Happens to Live Here!"	Marc Webb	Rachel Bloom & Aline Brosh McKenna	October 12, 2015	0.90
Rebecca Bunch finds out she's been offered a partnership with the Manhattan law firm where she works, but realizes that she isn't happy with her life. Just when she's wondering what to do, her ex-boyfriend from ten years ago, Josh Chan, walks by. He tells Rebecca that he had a lot of fun the summer they were together and compliments her looks. Josh then says that he's moving back home to West Covina, California, because people seem happier there. Rebecca moves to West Covina hoping to run into him again, but finds it more difficult than she expected. She meets Greg, a friend of Josh's, who invites her to a party and tells her that Josh has a girlfriend. Meanwhile, a middle-aged paralegal at her new workplace, Paula, finds out Rebecca's reason for moving out of New York, and confronts her about her obsession. Paula tells Rebecca that she is in love, and calls her brave, not crazy. Songs: "West Covina"; "The Sexy Getting Ready Song"; "West Covina (Reprise)" (sung by Rebecca & Paula)
2	2	"Josh's Girlfriend Is Really Cool!"	Don Scardino	Rachel Bloom & Aline Brosh McKenna	October 19, 2015	0.79
Rebecca makes a late-night trip to the grocery store and runs into Josh with his girlfriend Valencia. Floored by how pretty Valencia is, Rebecca decides to attend the yoga class Valencia teaches to become her friend, not realizing that Paula is feeling ignored. Even though Josh warns her not to get too close to Valencia, Rebecca takes her to lunch and helps her get a yoga studio. Josh finds out that Greg is into Rebecca and encourages him to go for it, but when Greg finds out that they dated before, he isn't happy. Valencia and Rebecca start to bond, but Rebecca takes that bond too far during a drunk night out. Rebecca blurts out that she and Josh were once in love, and Valencia storms away with Josh. Rebecca apologizes to Paula, calling her a true friend. Josh apologizes for asking Rebecca to lie and asks her out to dinner. Songs: "I'm So Good At Yoga" (sung by Valencia); "Feeling Kinda Naughty"
3	3	"I Hope Josh Comes to My Party!"	Tamra Davis	Rachel Bloom & Aline Brosh McKenna	October 26, 2015	0.67
When Josh's girlfriend tells him not to spend time alone with Rebecca, Paula suggests she throw a party as a way to invite him over. Rebecca faces her fear of hosting parties that she's had since her father walked out on her family in front of her friends. Although she successfully invites Josh, Greg is still angry at her and refuses to go. Rebecca is mortified when Josh shows up to a near-empty party, but he reassures her that it's totally normal and helps her spruce it up. Paula brings a crowd, and Greg decides to show up after all. Josh ignores a text from Valencia to stay at the party, and tells Rebecca that they should hang out as friends sometime; Rebecca reconciles with Greg. Songs: "Face Your Fears" (sung by Paula); "I Have Friends" (Sung by Rebecca & young Rebecca (Ava Acres)); "A Boy Band Made Up of Four Joshes" (sung by Josh)
4	4	"I'm Going on a Date with Josh's Friend!"	Stuart McDonald	Erin Ehrlich	November 2, 2015	0.95
Rebecca attempts to meet Josh at the skate park, but is dismayed when he doesn't come. To make herself feel better, she enlists the help of Heather to find a fling on Tinder, but changes her mind at the last second. The next day, Greg musters up his courage and asks Rebecca to "settle" for him. Josh starts looking for a job and, after seeing an opening at the tech store he likes, comes to Rebecca for help with his resumé, while simultaneously convincing Rebecca to accept Greg's date invitation. The resumé ends up making Josh look too uptight for the laid-back store and he instead must settle for a job at his father's radiology clinic. Greg and Rebecca go out to the taco festival for their date, which goes well, until Rebecca ends up ditching him for the vegan guacamole vendor she met. Greg confronts her after and storms out. Rebecca sees that Josh is at the clinic, and storms in with Josh to the tech center and gets him the job. Songs: "Sex With A Stranger"; "Settle For Me" (sung by Greg); "Settle For Him"
5	5	"Josh and I Are Good People!"	Alex Hardcastle	Michael Hitchcock	November 9, 2015	0.95
After Greg accuses both Rebecca and Josh of being terrible people, Rebecca tries to prove otherwise by getting her boss custody of his daughter. Meanwhile, Josh goes to a confession and plays basketball with his preacher and friend, Father Brah. He admits to having frequent amorous thoughts about Rebecca and is advised to do some soul searching. In the end, he confesses to Rebecca that he is attracted to her but in love with Valencia. Paula is put in charge of the office in Darryl and Rebecca's absence and attempts to get revenge on everyone who has mistreated her. Songs: "I Love My Daughter (But Not in a Creepy Way)" (sung by Darryl); "I'm A Good Person"; "I'm a Good Person (Reprise)" (expressed by Mrs. Hernandez)
6	6	"My First Thanksgiving with Josh!"	Joanna Kerns	Rene Gube	November 16, 2015	0.89
Paula helps Rebecca to get invited to Thanksgiving with Josh's family and Valencia. Rebecca sucks up to his parents and is warmly welcomed into the family, causing tension between Josh and Valencia, who is disliked by the Chans. However, argument leads to Josh asking Valencia to move in with him. After the dinner, Rebecca really has to go to the bathroom. Having finally saved up enough money to return to business school and move out of his dad's house, Greg quits his job. But when his father is admitted into the hospital and requires expensive treatment, he is forced to ask for his bar job back. At the end of the night, Greg and Rebecca end up hanging out together. Songs: "I Give Good Parent" (sung by Rebecca & Mrs. Chan); "What'll It Be?" (sung by Greg)
7	7	"I'm So Happy that Josh Is So Happy!"	Lawrence Trilling	Sono Patel	November 23, 2015	0.88
Valencia and Josh move into their new home, and Josh tries to surprise her with a new table, but she rejects the table, leading Josh to doubt their relationship. Seeing them together makes Rebecca depressed and anxious, which causes her to be sent home from work. She begins having visions of Dr. Phil, who advises her to get treatment and deal with her problems. Unwilling to go through therapy to get access to medication, she enlists Heather to help her break into a therapist's office to steal a prescription pad. They get caught, but Rebecca agrees to start therapy in return for avoiding arrest. Meanwhile, Paula almost sleeps with Calvin Young, the potential new and important client of the law firm. Songs: "Sexy French Depression"; "His Status Is Preferred" (sung by Paula); "Sexy Gonna Do It Song" (sung by Calvin)
8	8	"My Mom, Greg's Mom and Josh's Sweet Dance Moves!"	Steven Tsuchida	Rachel Specter & Audrey Wauchope	November 30, 2015	1.00
Rebecca's overly critical mother, Naomi, comes to West Covina and Rebecca struggles to impress her with her new life. Greg takes Heather to his estranged mother's house for a holiday dinner, where Heather criticizes him for being callous to his family. He apologizes to his mother and begins a relationship with Heather. Josh reunites with his old dance crew at the mall, where Rebecca's mother finds out that he is the reason for her daughter's move. Songs: "Where's the Bathroom?" (sung by Naomi); "California Christmastime" (sung by the full cast)
9	9	"I'm Going to the Beach with Josh and His Friends!"	Kenny Ortega	Dan Gregor & Doug Mand	January 25, 2016	0.88
Rebecca feels she has no friends and tries to hang out with Josh's group. Valencia notices her flirting with Josh and invites her to their beach trip to prove to the whole group that Rebecca is a crazy stalker. To bring herself to the center of attention, Rebecca rents a party bus, but still ends up feeling alone in there. When the situation escalates, all lies and secrets are discovered, but in the end Rebecca can make Josh believe that she moved for the same reason that he did: they both prefer West Covina over New York. Songs: "I Have Friends (Reprise)"; "Women Gotta Stick Together" (sung by Valencia); "Sugar"; "West Covina (Reprise II)" (Sung by Rebecca & Josh)
10	10	"I'm Back at Camp with Josh!"	Michael Schultz	Jack Dolgen	February 1, 2016	0.97
Josh volunteers at a camp for at-risk teens, with Valencia's disapproval. Rebecca buys herself in as a donor to lead empowerment seminars for the girls, but she secretly tries to recreate her own teenage summer camp experience with Josh. Meanwhile, Greg works on his commitment issues for Heather. Darryl invites the boys over for a party, but as he does not know any girls, he has to hire some. His evening ends with a surprising good-night kiss from White Josh. Songs: "Dear Joshua Felix Chan"; "Having a Few People Over" (sung by Darryl); "Put Yourself First" (sung by the camp teens)
11	11	"That Text Was Not Meant for Josh!"	Daisy von Scherler Mayer	Elisabeth Kiernan Averick	February 8, 2016	1.02
Rebecca mistakenly texts Josh instead of Paula that she moved to West Covina only because she loves him. To prevent Josh from seeing the message, she enters his apartment and deletes it from his phone, but he catches her when he returns, so she makes up a story about a burglary at her place. Meanwhile, Paula attempts to mend her marriage with Father Brah's help. When Josh decides to take Rebecca back to her apartment, Paula and her husband have to fake breaking in, and their little adventure brings them back together. Josh, however, becomes suspicious about Rebecca's increasingly complicated lies and leaves her alone, where she blames herself for ruining her relationships. Songs: "Textmergency" (sung by the lawyers); "Where Is the Rock?" (sung by the lawyers); "You Stupid Bitch"
12	12	"Josh and I Work on a Case!"	Steven Tsuchida	Rachel Bloom & Aline Brosh McKenna	February 22, 2016	0.92
Rebecca hopes to redeem herself by working on a case that she thinks will bring her closer to Josh. Rebecca tries to get people who live in Josh's apartment complex to sign a petition about the water pressure. Rebecca originally wants to spend time alone with him, but Josh ends up inviting a lot of his friends. Darryl begins to realize he likes White Josh. Paula recruits Trent, whom she found on the internet, to pose as Rebecca's boyfriend. Greg searches for Rebecca's true motives for taking on the case. Songs: "Group Hang" (sung by Rebecca & Josh's friends), "Romantic Moments"; "Cold Showers" (sung by Rebecca, Paula, Darryl & Josh's neighbors)
13	13	"Josh and I Go to Los Angeles!"	Michael Patrick Jann	Aline Brosh McKenna	February 29, 2016	0.86
Rebecca and Josh present their case in Los Angeles while also confronting their buried feelings. Greg still harbors feelings for Rebecca, which leads to Heather and Greg breaking up. After realizing he's bisexual, Darryl declares his love for White Josh in public. Songs: "JAP Battle" (rapped by Rebecca & Audra (Rachel Grate)); "Flooded with Justice" (sung by the plaintiffs); "Don't Settle for Me" (sung by Heather & Greg), "Flooded with Justice (Reprise)" (sung by the plaintiffs); "Dear Rebecca Nora Bunch" (sung by Trent)
14	14	"Josh Is Going to Hawaii!"	Erin Ehrlich	Sono Patel	March 7, 2016	0.81
Rebecca learns how Josh feels about her and contemplates her role in life. Darryl announces his newfound sexuality to everyone at the firm. Heather and Greg struggle to work together after their break-up. Songs: "Gettin' Bi" (sung by Darryl); "The Villain in My Own Story" (sung by Rebecca & Valencia); "Paula's Raccoon Song" (sung by Paula)
15	15	"Josh Has No Idea Where I Am!"	Steven Tsuchida	Rachel Bloom & Aline Brosh McKenna	March 21, 2016	0.71
Rebecca is stuck on a plane with Dr. Akopian, heading to New York to get her old job back, and recounts her turbulent track-record with the men in her life. Back in West Covina, Rebecca's friends attempt to search for her. Songs: "Dream Ghosts" (sung by Dr. Akopian & the Dream Ghosts); "The Whale"; "I'm a Blowfish" (sung by Rebecca & Peter (Jimmy Bellinger))
16	16	"Josh's Sister Is Getting Married!"	Alex Hardcastle	Rachel Specter & Audrey Wauchope	March 28, 2016	0.86
Rebecca is determined to get her life on track so when Josh’s sister, Jayma asks her to be a bridesmaid, Rebecca decides to use her role to make things right with Valencia. Paula cannot accept Rebecca’s new mindset while Greg, when helping someone else with their love dilemma, makes a realization of his own. Songs: "I Could If I Wanted To" (sung by Greg); "Clean Up on Aisle Four" (sung by Marty); "Heavy Boobs"
17	17	"Why Is Josh in a Bad Mood?"	Joanna Kerns	Jack Dolgen	April 11, 2016	0.77
Rebecca is hiding a big secret from Paula, which begins to strain their friendship. Josh Chan and Greg Serrano trade places when Josh makes a discovery that angers him, while Greg is happier than he has been in a long time. Rebecca has a revelation about her feelings for Greg. Songs: "I Gave You a UTI" (sung by Greg); "Angry Mad" (sung by Josh); "Oh My God I Think I Like You"
18	18	"Paula Needs to Get Over Josh!"	Aline Brosh McKenna	Rene Gube	April 18, 2016	0.82
Rebecca and Greg struggle with communication. At Jayma's wedding, Rebecca anticipates a romantic evening with Greg but things take an unexpected turn. Rebecca and Paula mend fences. Josh is at a crossroads in his relationship with his girlfriend. Songs: "After Everything I've Done For You (That You Didn't Ask For)" (sung by Paula); "One Indescribable Instant" (sung by Aunt Myrna (Lea Salonga))

== Production and development ==
The series was originally developed for Showtime, and a pilot was produced, but Showtime opted not to proceed with it on February 9, 2015. The CW picked up the series on May 7, 2015, for the Fall 2015–2016 season. The series has been extensively reworked for The CW, expanding the show format from a half-hour to a full hour and adjusting the content for broadcast television, as the original pilot was produced for premium cable. On October 5, 2015, shortly before the series premiere, The CW placed an order of five additional scripts. On November 23, 2015, the CW ordered another five episodes, raising the total for season 1 to 18 episodes.

=== Casting ===
On September 30, 2014, Santino Fontana, Donna Lynne Champlin, Vincent Rodriguez III and Michael McDonald joined Rachel Bloom in the series regular cast. With the move to The CW, the series went through casting changes and McDonald departed the cast. Shortly afterwards, Vella Lovell and Pete Gardner were added as regulars; with Lovell in the role of Heather, Rebecca's underachieving neighbor; and Gardner replacing McDonald in the role of Darryl, Rebecca's new boss.

=== Music ===
"Crazy Ex-Girlfriend: Original Television Soundtrack (Season 1 - Volume 1)" was released on February 19, 2016 in both explicit and clean versions. It includes all the songs from the first eight episodes of season one, alongside Bloom's a cappella rough demos of "Feeling Kinda Naughty", "I Have Friends", "Settle for Me", and "Sex with a Stranger" as well as Adam Schlesinger's demo version of "What'll It Be".

"Crazy Ex-Girlfriend: Original Television Soundtrack (Season 1 - Vol. 2)" was released on May 20, 2016. It includes all the songs from the last 10 episodes of season one, as well as demos of "JAP Battle", "I Could If I Wanted To", "Women Gotta Stick Together", "Group Hang", and "You Stupid Bitch".

== Reception ==
=== Critical response ===
The first season of Crazy Ex-Girlfriend received critical acclaim. At Metacritic, which assigns a rating out of 100 to reviews from mainstream critics, the first season received "generally favorable" reviews with an average score of 78 based on 23 reviews. Review aggregation website Rotten Tomatoes gave the first season a 97% positive rating, with an average rating of 7.70 out of 10 based on reviews from 62 critics, with the site's consensus stating: "Lively musical numbers and a refreshing, energetic lead, Rachel Bloom, make Crazy Ex-Girlfriend a charming, eccentric commentary on human relationships."

==== Critics' year-end lists ====
2015
- No. 1 - Pittsburgh Post-Gazette
- No. 5 - Las Vegas Weekly
- No. 5 - We Got This Covered
- No. 9 - CinemaBlend
- No. 9 - Entertainment Weekly
- No. 9 - Time Out New York
- No. 10 - The Star-Ledger
- — Chicago Reader
- — Flavorwire
- — IndieWire
- — Los Angeles Times (new shows)
- — Sioux City Journal
- — Star Tribune
- — Variety (pairs, with Jane the Virgin)

=== Awards and nominations ===
Award	Category	Nominee(s)	Result	Reference
68th Primetime Emmy Awards	Outstanding Choreography	Kathryn Burns ("I'm So Good at Yoga", "A Boy Band Made Up of Four Joshes" and "Settle for Me")	Won	
68th Primetime Emmy Awards	Outstanding Single-Camera Picture Editing for a Comedy Series	Kabir Akhtar ("Josh Just Happens to Live Here")	Won	
68th Primetime Emmy Awards	Outstanding Original Music and Lyrics	Adam Schlesinger, Rachel Bloom and Jack Dolgen ("Settle for Me")	Nominated	
68th Primetime Emmy Awards	Outstanding Original Main Title Theme Music	Rachel Bloom and Adam Schlesinger	Nominated	
Critics Choice Awards	Best Actress in a Comedy Series	Rachel Bloom	Won	
Dorian Awards	Unsung TV Show of the Year	Crazy Ex-Girlfriend	Nominated	
Golden Globe Award	Best Actress – Television Series Musical or Comedy	Rachel Bloom	Won	
Gotham Awards	Breakthrough Series – Long Form	Crazy Ex-Girlfriend	Won	
People's Choice Awards	Favorite New TV Comedy	Crazy Ex-Girlfriend	Nominated	
Poppy Awards	Best Comedy Series	Crazy Ex-Girlfriend	Nominated	
Poppy Awards	Best Actress in a Comedy	Rachel Bloom	Nominated	
Poppy Awards	Best Supporting Actor in a Comedy	Santino Fontana	Nominated	
Poppy Awards	Best Supporting Actress in a Comedy	Donna Lynne Champlin	Nominated	
TCA Awards	Outstanding Achievement in Comedy	Crazy Ex-Girlfriend	Nominated	
TCA Awards	Outstanding New Program	Crazy Ex-Girlfriend	Nominated	
TCA Awards	Individual Achievement in Comedy	Rachel Bloom	Won	

=== Ratings ===
Viewership and ratings per episode of Crazy Ex-Girlfriend season 1
No.	Title	Air date	Rating/share (18–49)	Viewers (millions)
1	"Josh Just Happens to Live Here!"	October 12, 2015	0.3/1	0.90
2	"Josh's Girlfriend Is Really Cool!"	October 19, 2015	0.3/1	0.79
3	"I Hope Josh Comes to My Party!"	October 26, 2015	0.2/1	0.67
4	"I'm Going on a Date with Josh's Friend!"	November 2, 2015	0.3/1	0.95
5	"Josh and I Are Good People!"	November 9, 2015	0.3/1	0.95
6	"My First Thanksgiving with Josh!"	November 16, 2015	0.3/1	0.89
7	"I'm So Happy that Josh Is So Happy!"	November 23, 2015	0.3/1	0.88
8	"My Mom, Greg's Mom and Josh's Sweet Dance Moves!"	November 30, 2015	0.3/1	1.00
9	"I'm Going to the Beach with Josh and His Friends!"	January 25, 2016	0.3/1	0.88
10	"I'm Back at Camp with Josh!"	February 1, 2016	0.4/1	0.97
11	"That Text Was Not Meant for Josh!"	February 8, 2016	0.4/1	1.02
12	"Josh and I Work on a Case!"	February 22, 2016	0.3/1	0.92
13	"Josh and I Go to Los Angeles!"	February 29, 2016	0.3/1	0.86
14	"Josh Is Going to Hawaii!"	March 7, 2016	0.3/1	0.81
15	"Josh Has No Idea Where I Am!"	March 21, 2016	0.2/1	0.71
16	"Josh's Sister Is Getting Married!"	March 28, 2016	0.3/1	0.86
17	"Why Is Josh in a Bad Mood?"	April 11, 2016	0.2/1	0.77
18	"Paula Needs to Get Over Josh!"	April 18, 2016	0.3/1	0.82
