= List of Crazy Ex-Girlfriend episodes =

American musical comedy-drama television series

Crazy Ex-Girlfriend is an American musical comedy-drama television series, created by Rachel Bloom and Aline Brosh McKenna, that premiered on The CW on October 12, 2015. The series stars Bloom as Rebecca Bunch, a depressed young woman who decides to follow her ex-boyfriend from New York City to West Covina, California in hopes of finding real happiness. Up until episode 38, when Rebecca decided to focus on herself, all episode titles followed the pattern of referring to Rebecca's ex-boyfriend, Josh (Vincent Rodriguez III).

During the course of the series, 62 episodes of Crazy Ex-Girlfriend aired, concluding on April 5, 2019. On April 2, 2018. The CW renewed the series for a fourth season. The final season contained 17 episodes, as well as a concert special filmed at the Orpheum Theatre. The season premiered on October 12, 2018, and ended on April 5, 2019.

== Series overview ==
Season	Episodes	Originally released	
Season	Episodes	First released	Last released
1	18	October 12, 2015	April 18, 2016
2	13	October 21, 2016	February 3, 2017
3	13	October 13, 2017	February 16, 2018
4	18	October 12, 2018	April 5, 2019

== Episodes ==
=== Season 1 (2015–16) ===
No. overall	No. in season	Title	Directed by	Written by	Original release date	US viewers (millions)
1	1	"Josh Just Happens to Live Here!"	Marc Webb	Rachel Bloom & Aline Brosh McKenna	October 12, 2015	0.90
2	2	"Josh's Girlfriend Is Really Cool!"	Don Scardino	Rachel Bloom & Aline Brosh McKenna	October 19, 2015	0.79
3	3	"I Hope Josh Comes to My Party!"	Tamra Davis	Rachel Bloom & Aline Brosh McKenna	October 26, 2015	0.67
4	4	"I'm Going on a Date with Josh's Friend!"	Stuart McDonald	Erin Ehrlich	November 2, 2015	0.95
5	5	"Josh and I Are Good People!"	Alex Hardcastle	Michael Hitchcock	November 9, 2015	0.95
6	6	"My First Thanksgiving with Josh!"	Joanna Kerns	Rene Gube	November 16, 2015	0.89
7	7	"I'm So Happy that Josh Is So Happy!"	Lawrence Trilling	Sono Patel	November 23, 2015	0.88
8	8	"My Mom, Greg's Mom and Josh's Sweet Dance Moves!"	Steven Tsuchida	Rachel Specter & Audrey Wauchope	November 30, 2015	1.00
9	9	"I'm Going to the Beach with Josh and His Friends!"	Kenny Ortega	Dan Gregor & Doug Mand	January 25, 2016	0.88
10	10	"I'm Back at Camp with Josh!"	Michael Schultz	Jack Dolgen	February 1, 2016	0.97
11	11	"That Text Was Not Meant for Josh!"	Daisy von Scherler Mayer	Elisabeth Kiernan Averick	February 8, 2016	1.02
12	12	"Josh and I Work on a Case!"	Steven Tsuchida	Rachel Bloom & Aline Brosh McKenna	February 22, 2016	0.92
13	13	"Josh and I Go to Los Angeles!"	Michael Patrick Jann	Aline Brosh McKenna	February 29, 2016	0.86
14	14	"Josh Is Going to Hawaii!"	Erin Ehrlich	Sono Patel	March 7, 2016	0.81
15	15	"Josh Has No Idea Where I Am!"	Steven Tsuchida	Rachel Bloom & Aline Brosh McKenna	March 21, 2016	0.71
16	16	"Josh's Sister Is Getting Married!"	Alex Hardcastle	Rachel Specter & Audrey Wauchope	March 28, 2016	0.86
17	17	"Why Is Josh in a Bad Mood?"	Joanna Kerns	Jack Dolgen	April 11, 2016	0.77
18	18	"Paula Needs to Get Over Josh!"	Aline Brosh McKenna	Rene Gube	April 18, 2016	0.82

=== Season 2 (2016–17) ===
No. overall	No. in season	Title	Directed by	Written by	Original release date	US viewers (millions)
19	1	"Where Is Josh's Friend?"	Marc Webb	Rachel Bloom & Aline Brosh McKenna & Marc Webb	October 21, 2016	0.53
20	2	"When Will Josh See How Cool I Am?"	Jay Chandrasekhar	Rene Gube	October 28, 2016	0.45
21	3	"All Signs Point to Josh... Or Is It Josh’s Friend?"	Stuart McDonald	Rachel Specter & Audrey Wauchope	November 4, 2016	0.54
22	4	"When Will Josh and His Friend Leave Me Alone?"	Paul Briganti	Erin Ehrlich	November 11, 2016	0.53
23	5	"Why Is Josh's Ex-Girlfriend Eating Carbs?"	Erin Ehrlich	Sono Patel	November 18, 2016	0.50
24	6	"Who Needs Josh When You Have a Girl Group?"	Stuart McDonald	Jack Dolgen	December 2, 2016	0.60
25	7	"Who's the Cool Girl Josh Is Dating?"	Jude Weng	Michael Hitchcock	December 9, 2016	0.54
26	8	"Who Is Josh's Soup Fairy?"	Linda Mendoza	Rachel Specter & Audrey Wauchope	January 6, 2017	0.71
27	9	"When Do I Get to Spend Time with Josh?"	Kabir Akhtar	Rachel Bloom & Aline Brosh McKenna	January 6, 2017	0.63
28	10	"Will Scarsdale Like Josh's Shayna Punim?"	Alex Hardcastle	Dan Gregor & Doug Mand	January 13, 2017	0.55
29	11	"Josh Is the Man of My Dreams, Right?"	Michael Patrick Jann	Elisabeth Kiernan Averick	January 20, 2017	0.57
30	12	"Is Josh Free in Two Weeks?"	Alex Hardcastle	Katie Schwartz	January 27, 2017	0.59
31	13	"Can Josh Take a Leap of Faith?"	Aline Brosh McKenna	Aline Brosh McKenna	February 3, 2017	0.58

=== Season 3 (2017–18) ===
No. overall	No. in season	Title	Directed by	Written by	Original release date	US viewers (millions)
32	1	"Josh's Ex-Girlfriend Wants Revenge."	Erin Ehrlich	Rachel Bloom & Aline Brosh McKenna	October 13, 2017	0.62
33	2	"To Josh, With Love."	Kabir Akhtar	Rachel Specter & Audrey Wauchope	October 20, 2017	0.60
34	3	"Josh Is A Liar."	Stuart McDonald	Michael Hitchcock	October 27, 2017	0.56
35	4	"Josh's Ex-Girlfriend Is Crazy."	Joseph Kahn	Rachel Bloom & Aline Brosh McKenna	November 3, 2017	0.65
36	5	"I Never Want to See Josh Again."	Stuart McDonald	Jack Dolgen	November 10, 2017	0.66
37	6	"Josh Is Irrelevant."	Max Winkler	Rachel Bloom, Aline Brosh McKenna & Ilana Peña	November 17, 2017	0.66
38	7	"Getting Over Jeff."	Stuart McDonald	Erin Ehrlich	December 8, 2017	0.63
39	8	"Nathaniel Needs My Help!"	Jude Weng	Rachel Specter & Audrey Wauchope	January 5, 2018	0.69
40	9	"Nathaniel Gets the Message!"	Kabir Akhtar	Elisabeth Kiernan Averick	January 12, 2018	0.66
41	10	"Oh, Nathaniel, It's On!"	Jude Weng	Sono Patel	January 26, 2018	0.65
42	11	"Nathaniel and I Are Just Friends!"	Erin Ehrlich	Rene Gube	February 2, 2018	0.62
43	12	"Trent?!"	Stuart McDonald	Dan Gregor & Doug Mand	February 9, 2018	0.60
44	13	"Nathaniel Is Irrelevant."	Aline Brosh McKenna	Aline Brosh McKenna & Michael Hitchcock	February 16, 2018	0.60

=== Season 4 (2018–19) ===
No. overall	No. in season	Title	Directed by	Written by	Original release date	US viewers (millions)
45	1	"I Want to Be Here"	Stuart McDonald	Rachel Bloom	October 12, 2018	0.40
46	2	"I Am Ashamed"	Rachel Specter & Audrey Wauchope (Note: Due to the DGA's decision to not recognize Specter and Wauchope as a directing team, only Wauchope is credited on-screen.)	Erin Ehrlich	October 19, 2018	0.38
47	3	"I'm On My Own Path"	Jude Weng	Alden Derck	October 26, 2018	0.41
48	4	"I'm Making Up for Lost Time"	Stuart McDonald	Elisabeth Kiernan Averick	November 2, 2018	0.46
49	5	"I'm So Happy for You"	Erin Ehrlich	Ilana Peña	November 9, 2018	0.42
50	6	"I See You"	Dan Gregor	Jack Dolgen	November 16, 2018	0.40
51	7	"I Will Help You"	Kabir Akhtar	Aline Brosh McKenna	November 30, 2018	0.50
52	8	"I'm Not the Person I Used to Be"	Stuart McDonald	Rene Gube	December 7, 2018	0.39
53	9	"I Need Some Balance"	Kimmy Gatewood	Elisabeth Kiernan Averick	January 11, 2019	0.45
54	10	"I Can Work With You"	Kabir Akhtar	Rachel Specter & Audrey Wauchope	January 18, 2019	0.41
55	11	"I'm Almost Over You"	Erin Ehrlich	Michael Hitchcock	January 25, 2019	0.37
56	12	"I Need a Break"	Jack Dolgen	Ilana Peña	February 1, 2019	0.40
57	13	"I Have to Get Out"	Stuart McDonald	Rene Gube	February 8, 2019	0.41
58	14	"I'm Finding My Bliss"	Kabir Akhtar	Elisabeth Kiernan Averick & Michael Hitchcock	March 15, 2019	0.31
59	15	"I Need to Find My Frenemy"	Stuart McDonald	Alden Derck & Aline Brosh McKenna	March 22, 2019	0.40
60	16	"I Have a Date Tonight"	Dan Gregor	Erin Ehrlich	March 29, 2019	0.38
61	17	"I'm in Love"	Aline Brosh McKenna	Aline Brosh McKenna & Rachel Bloom	April 5, 2019	0.50
62	18	"Yes, It's Really Us Singing: The Crazy Ex-Girlfriend Concert Special!"	Martin Pasetta, Jr.	Rachel Bloom & Adam Schlesinger & Jack Dolgen	April 5, 2019	0.38

== Ratings ==
Crazy Ex-Girlfriend : U.S. viewers per episode (thousands)

Season	Episode number																		Average
Season	1	2	3	4	5	6	7	8	9	10	11	12	13	14	15	16	17	18	Average
1	900	790	670	950	950	890	880	1000	880	970	1020	920	860	810	710	860	770	820	870
2	530	450	540	530	500	600	540	710	630	550	570	590	580	–					560
3	620	600	560	650	660	660	630	690	660	680	620	600	600	–					630
4	400	380	410	460	420	400	500	390	450	410	370	400	410	310	400	380	500	380	400

Audience measurement performed by Nielsen Media Research
