= Dan Levy (American comedian) =

American actor and comedian

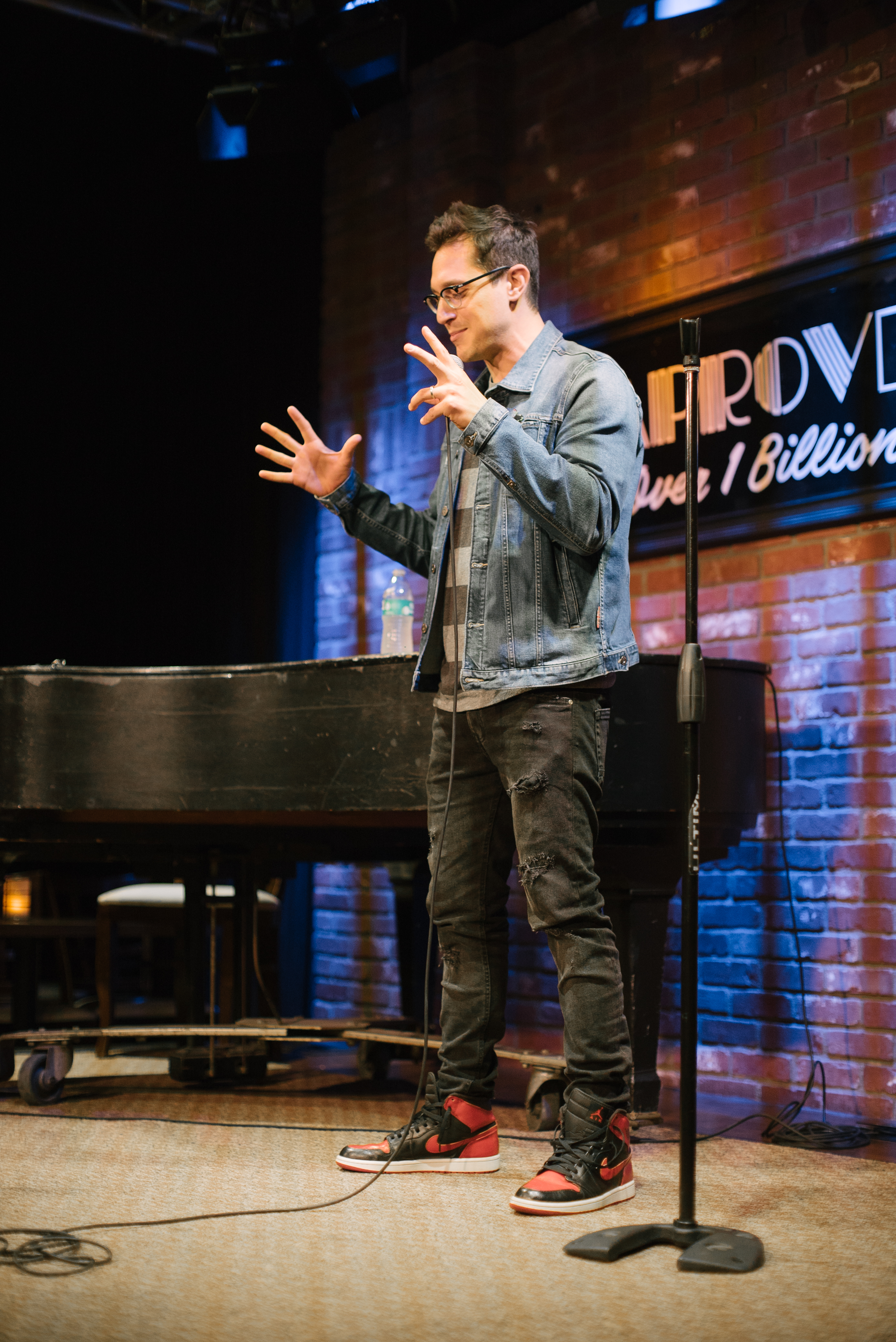
- Levy at the Improv in 2018
- Born: Daniel Levy; March 19, 1981 (age 45); Stamford, Connecticut, U.S.
- Children: 3

Comedy career
- Years active: 1996–present
- Medium: Stand-up
- Website: danlevyshow.com

Daniel Levy (born March 19, 1981) is an American comedian, actor, writer and producer based in Los Angeles. He began performing stand-up in the 2000s and has released three comedy albums, including his most recent special Dan Levy: Lion in 2016. He has written for several television comedies including Whitney (2011–2013) and was a producer of The Awesomes (2013–2015), Mulaney (2014–15), and The Goldbergs (2014–15). In 2020, he created the NBC series Indebted.

== Early life ==
Levy was born on March 19, 1981, to Linda and Elliott L. Levy. In 1993, Levy was a member of the "Half Pint Players", a teenage improvization group in Stamford, Connecticut. He began performing as a comedian while attending Emerson College in Boston.

== Career ==
Levy has performed at the Montreal Just For Laughs Comedy Festival, New York Comedy Festival, SF Sketchfest, and toured with Aziz Ansari, John Mulaney, and Whitney Cummings. He has made TV appearances on Premium Blend, Comedy Central Presents, The Late Late Show with Craig Kilborn, Late Night with Seth Meyers, Chelsea Lately, The Office, Enlightened, Atypical, and @midnight. His Comedy Central album Congrats on Your Success debuted #1 on iTunes when it was released in 2012. His hour-long comedy special Dan Levy: LION first premiered on Seeso.

As a host, Levy has worked on four MTV shows including Your Face Or Mine and MTV Spring Break, and his own talk show for College Humor: IHaveToGoInAMinuteShow, a daily comedy show directed by Todd Strauss-Schulson. Levy produced, wrote, and starred in My Long Distance Relationship, a 10-part web series for Crackle.

In April 2013, Levy collaborated with DJ Jensen Karp to create Baby Talk, a live comedy show where three to four comedians ask for parenting advice from children between the ages of 5 and 10 years old. The show was held at NerdMelt Showroom in Los Angeles, which later became a JASH series. Some of the guests included Blake Griffin, Paul Scheer, Natasha Leggero, Bo Burnham, Neal Brennan, and Jermaine Fowler.

In Fall 2016, Levy released his first hour-long comedy special, Dan Levy: LION, on the NBC streaming platform Seeso and Amazon.

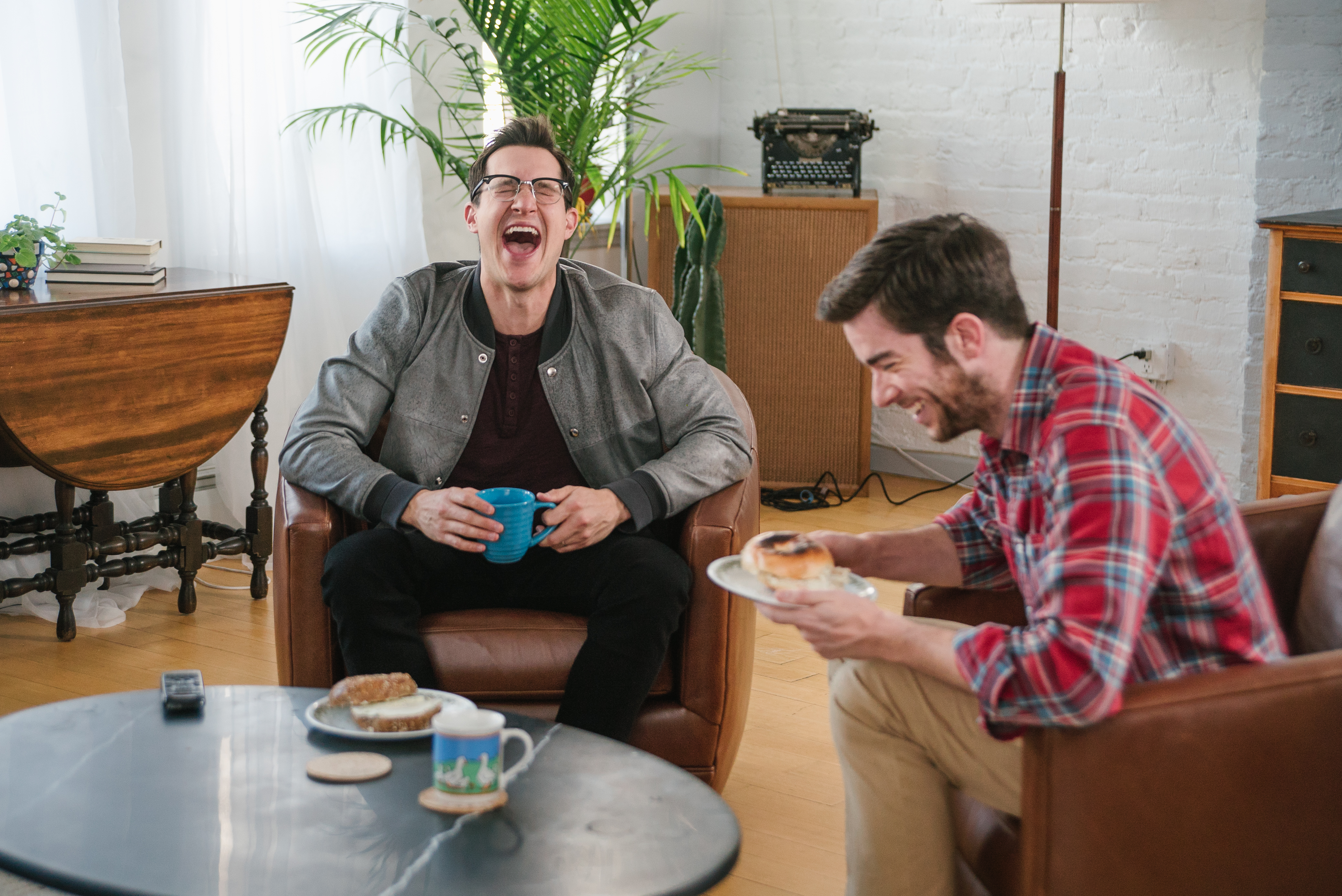
Levy shooting a promo for his 2016 special, Dan Levy: LION, with longtime friend John Mulaney

Levy executive produced Pretty Wild for E!, and the VH1 sketch series Stevie TV. Levy has written for the Roast of Justin Bieber, and the sitcoms Whitney, Mulaney, The Awesomes, and seasons 2–5 of The Goldbergs, working his way up to Executive Producer. In 2020 Levy created the series Indebted for NBC, starring Fran Drescher, Steven Weber, Adam Pally, Abby Elliott, and Jessy Hodges. Since January 2021, he has been the host of the discovery+ original series House Hunters: Comedians on Couches.

== Personal life ==
Levy married television writer Rachel Specter in 2010. He is close friends with comedian John Mulaney.

== Filmography ==
=== Films ===
Year	Title	Role	Notes
2005	Dirty Famous	Unknown	
2005	Starved for Attention	Frederick	
2005	Hope Rocks: The Concert with a Cause	Himself	
2007	Cash Cow	Unicom's Evil Corporate Shill and Anchorman	
2007	My Sexiest Year	Mark	
2008	Spring Break 2008: Pretty Smart	Unknown	
2008	Below the Law	Dave	Also producer, writer
2009	My Long Distance Relationship	Sam	Also executive producer, writer, creator
2009	Blimp Prom	Danny Goodyear	Also writer
2009	Frat Party	Chad	
2009	Funkt Up	Himself	
2010	Naked But Funny		
2010	Axe: Dirtcathlon	D.J. Croozeship	
2010	A Night of 140 Tweets: A Celebrity Tweet-A-Thon for Haiti	Himself	
2011	Mardi Gras: Spring Break	Frat House MC	
2011	A Very Harold & Kumar Christmas	Reporter	
2012	Cyberstalker	Mystery Man	
2012	Roast of Parks Bonifay	Himself	
2015	Bad Night	"Meatball"	

=== Television ===
Year	Title	Role	Notes
2002	The Andy Dick Show	Nick	
2002	The Late Late Show with Craig Kilborn	Himself	Guest comedian
2004	Your Face or Mine?	Himself	Host
2004	ESPN SportsCentury	Himself	
2005	Almost Funny	Himself	Also co-producer and writer
2005	The Reality Show	Himself	
2006	Premium Blend	Himself	
2007	The Suite Life of Zack & Cody	Jerry Barns	Episode: "Risk It All"
2008–2009	My Long Distance Relationship	Sam	Also executive producer, writer, creator
2009	NESN Comedy All-Stars	Himself	Also producer
2009	Comedy Central Presents	Himself	Also writer
2009	Casting Call: Spring Break '83	Himself	Host
2009–2013	Chelsea Lately	Himself	Round Table guest
2010	Laugh Track Mash-ups	Dan	Also producer, writer
2010	Pretty Wild		Also executive producer, writer, creator
2011	Enlightened	Seth / Sandy	5 episodes
2011	The X Factor Digital Experience	Himself	Host
2011	13th Annual Young Hollywood Awards	Himself	Won – Comedian of the Year Award
2012–2013	Whitney		Story editor, 32 episodes; also writer
2012	The Office	Trivia Moderator	Episode: "Trivia"
2012	Stevie TV		Producer
2012–2013	Love You, Mean It with Whitney Cummings	Himself	
2013–2015	The Awesomes		Producer
2014–2015	Mulaney	Dad (voice)	Episode: "The Doula", also co-producer
2014–2018	The Goldbergs		Executive producer, writer
2017	Sidekick with Matt Mira	Himself	
2018	Atypical	Hip Therapist	Episode: "Juiced!"
2018	Crazy Ex-Girlfriend	Fedora Guy	Episode: "I Am Ashamed"
2020	Indebted	Cousin Dan	Creator, executive producer; 12 episodes
2020–2021	House Hunters: Comedians on Couches	Himself	Host

== Discography ==
- Congrats On Your Success (2011)
- Running out of Minutes (2013)
- Dan Levy: LION (2016)
