= Indebted =

2020 American television sitcom

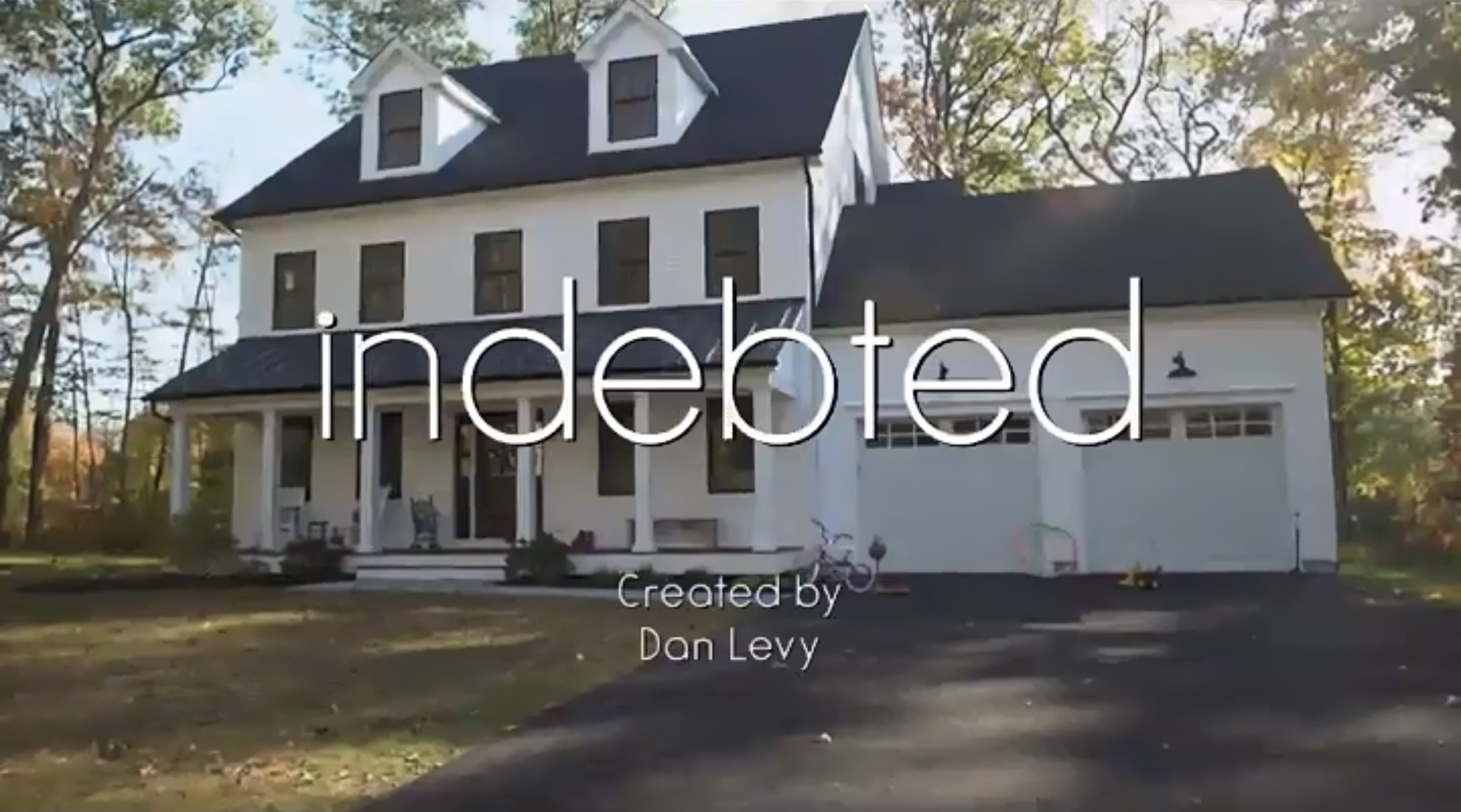
- Genre: Sitcom
- Created by: Dan Levy
- Starring: Adam Pally; Abby Elliott; Jessy Hodges; Steven Weber; Fran Drescher
- Music by: Brendan Long
- Country of origin: United States
- Original language: English
- No. of seasons: 1
- No. of episodes: 12

Production
- Executive producers: Dan Levy; Doug Robinson; Andy Ackerman; David Guarascio
- Producer: Adam Pally
- Cinematography: Wayne Kennan
- Editor: Brian Schnuckel
- Camera setup: Multi-camera
- Running time: 22 minutes
- Production companies: Screaming Elliot Productions; Doug Robinson Productions; Sony Pictures Television Studios; Universal Television

Original release
- Network: NBC
- Release: February 6 – April 16, 2020

Indebted is an American television sitcom that aired on NBC from February 6 to April 16, 2020. The series was created by Dan Levy and co-executive produced with Doug Robinson, Andy Ackerman and David Guarascio for Sony Pictures Television.

In June 2020, the series was canceled after one season.

== Plot ==
The series follows a couple, Dave and Rebecca, who are ready to start a new life after years of parenting. That is, until Dave's parents show up unannounced and broke, leaving Dave with no choice but to open the door to the people who gave him everything, which eventually leads to a clash of parental chaos among families.

== Cast ==
=== Main ===
- Adam Pally as Dave Klein, Rebecca's husband.
- Abby Elliott as Rebecca Klein, Dave's wife.
- Jessy Hodges as Joanna Klein, Dave's lesbian sister and owner of a pet-grooming shop.
- Steven Weber as Stew Klein, Dave's father, and a retired TV pitchman.
- Fran Drescher as Debbie Klein, Dave's loving but extremely overbearing mother.

=== Recurring ===
- Anders Garrett as Asher Klein, Dave and Rebecca's son.
- Vivien Lyra Blair as Hazel Klein, Dave and Rebecca's daughter (Margaux Heck portrayed the character in the pilot).

=== Guest ===
- Asif Ali as Ravi, Dave's childhood friend and employee who flips houses for a living.
- Lilan Bowden as Hannah, Joanna's girlfriend.
- Richard Kind as Artie, Dave's uncle and Debbie's older brother.

== Episodes ==
No.	Title	Directed by	Written by	Original release date	U.S. viewers (millions)
1	"Everybody's Talking About the Pilot"	Andy Ackerman	Dan Levy	February 6, 2020	2.12
Burdened by medical debt and a spendthrift lifestyle, aging couple Stew and Debbie are forced to move in with their son Dave and his wife Rebecca while they decide whether to sell their house. At first, Dave has no problem taking care of his parents, and even agrees to help renovate the house. However, both Debbie and Stew are incredibly immature and shirk their responsibilities, culminating in them filming an online video for fundraising purposes that features images of a half-naked Rebecca. An embarrassed Dave kicks them out, but when he watches the full video and realizes how much they love him and Rebecca, he changes his mind and invites them to stay as long as they need to.
2	"Everybody's Talking About Dav"	Gail Mancuso	Dan Mintz	February 13, 2020	1.55
Dave and Rebecca learn that their son Asher has a chance to enter his school's gifted program, but when they try to help him prepare for the entrance exam, he is unable to make any progress. Dave then learns that his mother got him into the gifted program by lying about his age, and that he is in fact no smarter than the average adult. After Debbie has a nightmare about her son being arrested for lying about Asher's age, the two come clean to Rebecca. Even though Asher passes the exam, they tell him he didn't get into the program. Stew intervenes in Joanna's dating life by telling her that she needs to take a break and figure herself out before trying to find the right partner.
3	"Everybody's Talking About the Mental Load"	Phill Lewis	Rachel Specter & Audrey Wauchope	February 20, 2020	1.47
Rebecca teaches Dave about her "mental load", the vast array of responsibilities she has to perform to keep the house functioning. Eager to prove he can be responsible as well, Dave suggests that they switch "loads": he'll take care of the house while she manages Stew and Debbie. As it turns out, neither is capable of handling the other's load, as Dave accidentally throws out all of his wife's things while cleaning the garage while Rebecca, in a foolish attempt to help Stew use Venmo, gives $5,000 to a random stranger, setting her in-laws back even further. The couple admit their failings to each other, accepting that their loads are unique. Dave makes more of an effort to start helping around the house.
4	"Everybody's Talking About Hot Goss"	Phill Lewis	Dan Levy	February 27, 2020	1.48
Joanna's new girlfriend Hannah disapproves of her family's favorite pastime, gossiping, so she asks them to give it up; when Dave and Rebecca realize that people have been gossiping about them being broke and Dave almost loses a valuable contracting job, they decide she's right and make a family pact to stop sharing gossip. Unfortunately, while having dinner, they break their promise by huddling in the garage with Stew and Debbie to gossip about a neighbor. Joanna is furious, but then realizes that the same neighbor is running a sex cult and that Hannah has been trying to recruit her this entire time. Hannah leaves, and Joanna finally embraces her family's love of gossip.
5	"Everybody's Talking About the Tooth Fairy"	Andy Ackerman	Theresa Mulligan Rosenthal	March 5, 2020	1.42
Dave and Rebecca insist that Stew and Debbie stop spoiling their grandchildren with expensive gifts, including giving Asher a $100 bill for his loose tooth. When they take it back, however, Asher becomes depressed, and Dave tells his parents to respect his and Rebecca's authority as parents. Joanna invites her girlfriend Audrey over for a playdate, but Audrey's children turn out to be grown adults who disrespect her family. Joanna kicks them out, and Stew and Debbie patch things up by lying to Asher, telling him that his parents are, in fact, the Tooth Fairy. They also agree to abide by their son's rules, and refrain from trying to parent his children.
6	"Everybody's Talking About Doctor Uncle"	Phill Lewis	Dan Mintz	March 12, 2020	1.50
When Debbie's brother Artie comes to visit, the whole family gradually becomes aware of how often they take advantage of each other: Artie passes chores onto Debbie, who passes her own chores onto her children or Rebecca, and Dave frequently passes them onto Joanna, even teaching his wife how to do so since she's technically Joanna's older sister. Everything culminates in a full-blown family argument, until Stew puts things into perspective and gets all of them to apologize to each other while finally admitting to Artie his long-buried resentment of how his actions make it hard to spend time with Debbie. The two men gain a newfound respect for each other, which Stew quickly loses by taking Artie to the wrong airport.
7	"Everybody's Talking About a Web of Lies"	Fred Savage	Audrey Wauchope & Rachel Specter	March 19, 2020	1.93
Dave discovers he doesn't have the money to buy the minivan he promised Rebecca; Stew advises him to lie about it until he can find another job. Rebecca, annoyed by what she thinks is Dave backing out of his promise, buys the minivan with Debbie's encouragement but then lies about it as well to keep from upsetting her husband. The couple finds themselves having to spin more and more lies to cover up their old ones, until they finally learn the truth when Dave buys a second minivan and they have to sell their cars to pay for them. Dave and Rebecca promise each other that they will never again try to lie or keep secrets, and Stew and Debbie promise to stop meddling with their relationship.
8	"Everybody's Talking About FOMO"	Phill Lewis	Theresa Mulligan Rosenthal & Rupinder Gill	March 26, 2020	1.57
For their one night without their kids, Dave and Rebecca plan an epic night out while sending Stew and Debbie to watch Joanna's dogs while she goes on a meditative retreat. Instead, after realizing how miserable Joanna is, they talk her into staying and throw a party. Dave and Rebecca find that everything they want to do is unavailable, and waste their entire night before giving up and going to Joanna's place. Debbie inquires why her kids feel so bad, and learns that they all have FOMO and constantly judge themselves against how other people are having fun. Horrified, she and Stew share a valuable life lesson: it's more important to enjoy the time you have with your loved ones, however short it may be.
9	"Everybody's Talking About Pleasure"	Eric Dean Seaton	Annie Mebane	March 26, 2020	1.46
Debbie suggests to Dave and Rebecca that their sex life needs some improvement, triggering stress in their relationship as neither wants to acknowledge that they might be unsatisfied with each other. Joanna confronts Stew about his homophobia, which he denies; to prove it, she insists that he make dinner for her and her girlfriend from high school, Jenny. Dave finally decides to send an extremely intimate photo to his wife, but accidentally sends it to his entire family. Rebecca goes to comfort him, and they have sex. Joanna realizes her father has always accepted her for who she is and agrees to accompany him to an Indigo Girls concert.
10	"Everybody's Talking About Neighbors"	Phill Lewis	Steve Basilone	April 2, 2020	1.39
Stew and Debbie set up a "wine club" to build a community with their neighbors, which Dave and Rebecca find weird and off-putting. Their suspicions are confirmed when they go to a meeting and the neighbors reveal that they don't like wine club and are only humoring Stew and Debbie. When Dave realizes how much the club means to his parents, however, he agrees to one final meeting, but the neighbors finally get fed up and decide to just leave. Stew and Debbie are saddened, and Dave and Rebecca console them by saying their family is already a community. When they go down, they discover that the neighbors have changed their minds and want to continue working on their sense of community.
11	"Everybody's Talking About Kings and Queens"	Phill Lewis	David Guarascio	April 9, 2020	1.41
Stew and Debbie decide to start working again, with Debbie becoming a professional life coach while Stew goes to Joanna's shop to work on a new product he can sell. Debbie takes Dave and Rebecca as her first clients, and gives them the same advice: be demanding and confrontational. The two quickly realize that she gives terrible advice. Stew comes up with an invention which fails horribly when he tests it. Joanna brings Debbie over, and she tells her husband that whatever failures and setbacks they experience, they share them together. Debbie subsequently convinces Joanna to become a client, but dismisses her when she insists on talking about her business plans.
12	"Everybody's Talking About Shiva"	Phill Lewis	Annie Mebane	April 16, 2020	1.56
Artie arrives with news that Debbie's great-aunt Judith has passed away, and so a blood female relative must be chosen to host her shiva. Rebecca is given the honor, but Artie hates her decision not to host a traditional event and talks his sister into holding her own shiva. Annoyed that Debbie doesn't respect her choices, Rebecca returns her shiva shawl, which is considered a great insult. Realizing that he's driven a wedge between his family, Artie makes up for it by offering his house in Florida so Debbie and Stew can move out. Joanna, desperate to find someone to love, kisses a woman who turns out to be her cousin Margaret. Rebecca and Debbie talk things over, and decide that moving out is not the right decision. Artie withdraws his offer against Dave's wishes, and his parents settle into his home for good.

== Production ==
=== Development ===
On January 23, 2019, it was announced that NBC had given the production, then titled Uninsured, received a pilot order commitment. The pilot was written by Dan Levy who was also set to executive produce alongside Doug Robinson, Alison Greenspan and Andy Ackerman. Production companies involved with the pilot include Doug Robinson Productions and Sony Pictures Television. On May 11, 2019, it was announced that NBC had given the green-lighting production, now titled changed to Indebted, a series order. A few days later, it was announced that the series would premiere as a mid-season replacement in the mid-season of 2020. The series premiered on February 6, 2020. On June 15, 2020, NBC canceled the series after one season.

=== Casting ===
In February 2019, it was announced that Adam Pally and Abby Elliott had been cast in the pilot's leading roles. Although the pilot was ordered, in March 2019 it was reported that Fran Drescher and Steven Weber had joined the cast.

=== Filming ===
Indebted was filmed at Sony Pictures Studios in Culver City, California, but it is set in Stamford, Connecticut.

== Reception ==
=== Critical response ===
On Rotten Tomatoes, the series holds an approval rating of 27% with an average rating of 3.85/10, based on 11 reviews. On Metacritic, it has a weighted average score of 36 out of 100, based on 8 critics, indicating "generally unfavorable reviews".

=== Ratings ===
Viewership and ratings per episode of Indebted
No.	Title	Air date	Rating (18–49)	Viewers (millions)	DVR (18–49)	DVR viewers (millions)	Total (18–49)	Total viewers (millions)
1	"Everybody's Talking About the Pilot"	February 6, 2020	0.4	2.12	TBD	TBD	TBD	TBD
2	"Everybody's Talking About Dav"	February 13, 2020	0.3	1.55	TBD	TBD	TBD	TBD
3	"Everybody's Talking About The Mental Load"	February 20, 2020	0.4	1.47	TBD	TBD	TBD	TBD
4	"Everybody's Talking About Hot Goss"	February 27, 2020	0.4	1.48	TBD	TBD	TBD	TBD
5	"Everybody's Talking About the Tooth Fairy"	March 5, 2020	0.3	1.42	TBD	TBD	TBD	TBD
6	"Everybody's Talking About Doctor Uncle"	March 12, 2020	0.4	1.50	TBD	TBD	TBD	TBD
7	"Everybody's Talking About a Web of Lies"	March 19, 2020	0.5	1.93	TBD	TBD	TBD	TBD
8	"Everybody's Talking About FOMO"	March 26, 2020	0.4	1.57	TBD	TBD	TBD	TBD
9	"Everybody's Talking About Pleasure"	March 26, 2020	0.3	1.46	TBD	TBD	TBD	TBD
10	"Everybody's Talking About Neighbors"	April 2, 2020	0.3	1.39	TBD	TBD	TBD	TBD
11	"Everybody's Talking About Kings and Queen"	April 9, 2020	0.3	1.41	TBD	TBD	TBD	TBD
12	"Everybody's Talking About Shiva"	April 16, 2020	0.4	1.56	TBD	TBD	TBD	TBD
