= The X Factor Digital Experience =

- Created by: Simon Cowell
- Written by: Jon Reynaga; Carrie Borzillo; Margaret Kerrison
- Directed by: Marc Scarpa
- Creative director: Daniel Frydman
- Presented by: Taryn Southern; Dan Levy; Jim Cantiello
- Judges: Simon Cowell; L.A. Reid; Paula Abdul (2011); Nicole Scherzinger (2011)
- Theme music composer: Simon Cowell
- Country of origin: United States
- Original language: English
- No. of seasons: 1
- No. of episodes: 15

Production
- Executive producers: Simon Cowell; Owen Leimbach; Jim Frenkel; Dan Pelson
- Producer: Marc Scarpa Mike Rotman
- Running time: 60–150 minutes
- Production companies: SYCOtv; Sony Music Entertainment; FremantleMedia North America

Original release
- Network: Fox
- Release: October 25 – December 22, 2011

The X Factor Digital Experience is a live digital pre-show produced by SYCOtv, FOX, Sony and FremantleMedia North America that aired in 2011 ahead of The X Factor. In addition to watching the program live on television, the audience was able to participate on multiple platforms in real-time.

Participants could start online with the streaming digital pre-show one hour prior to each live televised broadcast. Hosts Taryn Southern, Jim Cantiello and Dan Levy along with guests—including judges Simon Cowell, L.A. Reid, Paula Abdul and Nicole Scherzinger—and participants discussed performances, contestant's fashion, and song choices. Participants could tweet questions live to the hosts and their guests and some fans were selected to join the live-stream via Skype.

X Factor Digital was honored with a Cannes Bronze Lion for Branded Content and Entertainment at the Cannes Lions 59th International Festival of Creativity and was an Official Honoree in the Interactive Advertising category for the 16th Annual Webby Awards.
