= Fuck Me, Ray Bradbury =

2010 Internet music video

- Rachel Bloom with a photograph of Ray Bradbury
- Directed by: Paul Briganti
- Written by: Rachel Bloom
- Produced by: Jack Dolgen; Jon Siebels
- Starring: Rachel Bloom
- Cinematography: Paul Rondeau
- Music by: Rachel Bloom
- Release date: August 15, 2010 (YouTube)
- Running time: 2 minutes 41 seconds
- Country: United States
- Language: English

Fuck Me, Ray Bradbury is a 2010 satirical Internet music video that was nominated for a 2011 Hugo Award for Best Dramatic Presentation, Short Form. The video features actress and comedian Rachel Bloom playing the role of a nerdy female high school student, and pokes fun at people who make online video love letters to their favorite celebrity. The song lyrics describe Bloom's character's lack of romantic interest in boys her own age, because she would rather stay home and read science fiction and fantasize, in rather sexually explicit language, about being a literary groupie for legendary and groundbreaking, but 89-year-old Golden Age of Science Fiction novelist and screenwriter Ray Bradbury.

The music and lyrics were written by Bloom and the music video was directed and filmed by Paul Briganti, and choreographed by Briganti and Katie Lee Hill. The song was produced by Jack Dolgen and Jon Siebels, with additional arrangements by Dolgen.

== Bradbury's response ==
On Bradbury's 90th birthday, Mark Edward visited Bradbury's home and showed him the video. He reported that Bradbury "was charmed by the whole thing", and that he watched it with a "wise old knowing gleam in his eyes" and "a few soft chuckles."
