= Rachel Specter =

American writer, producer, and actress

- Born: Tampa, Florida, U.S.
- Occupations: Writer, producer, actress
- Years active: 2003–present
- Spouse: Dan Levy (m. 2010)
- Children: 3

Rachel Specter (born April 9, 1980) is an American writer, producer, and actress. She was a producer and writer of Crazy Ex-Girlfriend (2015–2019). She began her career as an actress but has since written for TV series like One Tree Hill and Cougar Town, and produced Hyperlinked (2017) and Indebted (2020).

== Life and career ==
Specter was born in Tampa, Florida. She graduated from the University of Florida, with honors. She played the role of Courtney in The House Bunny, and guest-starred in episodes of How I Met Your Mother, Gilmore Girls, What I Like About You, and Entourage. She has also appeared on Attack of the Show!, The Feed, and the web series Long Distance Relationship.

Before concentrating on behind the scenes work, Specter appeared as one of the actresses for the Sunsilk Color Showdown ad campaign. She was also known for a series of ads for RGX from Right Guard, Procter & Gamble's mid-2000s competitor against Axe, along with ads for Jack Link's Beef Jerky.

Spector launched her writing career when she was 29 along with her partner Audrey Wauchope when they were hired to the staff of One Tree Hill. In 2017, after the show had ended, Wauchope tweeted a thread about sexual harassment and misconduct that both she and Specter experienced on their writing job for One Tree Hill. While she did not name him or the show in the thread, it was confirmed that she was referring to the creator and showrunner of One Tree Hill, Mark Schwann. In another tweet, Wauchope discussed that the day before Spector's wedding, Schwann pulled aside Spector into his office, closed the door, and asked her if she really wanted to go through with the marriage and asked if he had a chance with her. Her allegations encouraged many other writers and actresses to speak out about sexual harassment they had experienced from Schwann.

In 2018, Specter directed an episode of Crazy Ex-Girlfriend, alongside her longtime producing and writing partner Audrey Wauchope. However, due to a Directors Guild of America regulation regarding only established duos being granted directing credit, only Wauchope was able to be credited for the episode, and Wauchope and Rachel Bloom have taken up the cause for Specter to be credited equally for her direction.

== Filmography ==
- 2007 American Family as Amy Foster – television series
- 2007 My Sexiest Year as Sue Ryker
- 2008 Prom Night as Taylor
- 2008 The House Bunny as Courtney
- 2009 Alone in the Dark II as Natalie
- 2009 Deep in the Valley as Bambi Cummings
