= Crazy Ex-Girlfriend =

2010s musical television series

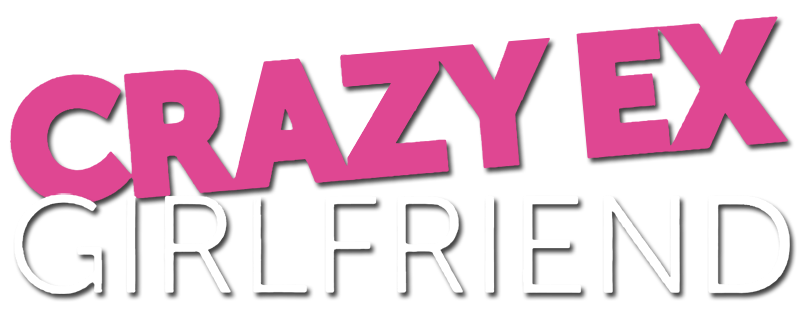
- Genre: Romantic comedy; Black comedy; Satire; Comedy drama; Cringe comedy; Musical
- Created by: Rachel Bloom; Aline Brosh McKenna
- Starring: Rachel Bloom; Vincent Rodriguez III; Santino Fontana; Donna Lynne Champlin; Pete Gardner; Vella Lovell; Gabrielle Ruiz; David Hull; Scott Michael Foster; Skylar Astin
- Opening theme: "Crazy Ex-Girlfriend" performed by Rachel Bloom (season 1) "I'm Just a Girl in Love" performed by Rachel Bloom (season 2) "You Do/You Don't Wanna Be Crazy" performed by Rachel Bloom (season 3) "Meet Rebecca" performed by the cast (season 4)
- Ending theme: "Crazy Ex-Girlfriend" (instrumental, season 1) "I'm Just a Girl in Love" (instrumental, season 2) "You Do/You Don't Wanna Be Crazy" (instrumental, season 3) "Meet Rebecca" (instrumental, season 4)
- Composers: Adam Schlesinger; Jerome Kurtenbach (pilot only); Tom Polce - Score (all seasons); Frank Ciampi - Score (all seasons)
- Country of origin: United States
- Original language: English
- No. of seasons: 4
- No. of episodes: 62 (list of episodes)

Production
- Executive producers: Aline Brosh McKenna; Rachel Bloom; Marc Webb; Erin Ehrlich; Sarah Caplan; Michael Hitchcock
- Producers: Sarah Caplan; Rachel Specter; Audrey Wauchope; Rene Gube
- Production location: West Covina, California
- Cinematography: Jonathan Sela; Charles Papert; Todd A. Dos Reis; Ian Dodd
- Camera setup: Single-camera
- Running time: 39–43 minutes
- Production companies: Lean Machine; webbterfuge (season 1); Black Lamb (seasons 2–4); racheldoesstuff (seasons 2–4); Warner Bros. Television; CBS Television Studios

Original release
- Network: The CW
- Release: October 12, 2015 – April 5, 2019

Crazy Ex-Girlfriend is an American romantic musical comedy-drama television series that premiered on October 12, 2015, on The CW and ran for four seasons, ending on April 5, 2019. The series was created, written, and directed by Rachel Bloom and Aline Brosh McKenna and stars Bloom in the lead role as Rebecca Bunch, a lawyer who moves from New York City to West Covina, California, to pursue her ex-boyfriend from high-school summer camp.

The show received widespread critical acclaim and developed a cult following, despite drawing consistently low ratings throughout its four-season run. It won several awards including multiple Primetime Emmy Awards, a Golden Globe Award, and a Critics Choice Award. It is one of the lowest-rated shows in television history to be renewed through four seasons by its parent network.

== Plot ==
Rebecca Bunch is a Yale- and Harvard-educated lawyer who works for a top New York City law firm. When offered a promotion, she panics, flees the building, and happens to encounter Josh Chan, whom she dated briefly as a teenager. Josh tells her that he is moving back to his hometown of West Covina, California. She decides to follow Josh to West Covina in search of happiness, while telling herself that Josh was not the reason she decided to move. She gets a job at Darryl Whitefeather's law firm, becomes friends with the firm's paralegal Paula and her neighbor Heather, and begins an on-again-off-again relationship with Josh's friend Greg, all while trying to reconnect with Josh, much to the displeasure of his girlfriend Valencia.

In the second season, Rebecca begins a tumultuous romantic relationship with Josh after Valencia dumps him. Greg leaves town to attend business school at Emory, and Rebecca and Valencia begin to become friends. Meanwhile, the wealthy, amoral Nathaniel Plimpton becomes a partner at Darryl's firm. Hoping to cement their troubled relationship, Rebecca and Josh plan to be married, but he leaves her at the altar.

In the third season, Rebecca's emotional state hits rock bottom, and she attempts suicide. She receives a diagnosis of borderline personality disorder and begins attempting to take better care of her mental health and take responsibility for her actions. After she begins an on-again-off-again relationship with Nathaniel, a series of events leads to Rebecca pushing her stalker Trent off a roof. Determined to take responsibility for her actions, Rebecca pleads guilty to the crime and goes to jail.

In the fourth season, Rebecca is released from jail and quits her job at the law firm. Greg returns to town, while Heather and Valencia move away for work and life commitments. With all the main cast members becoming more mature and emotionally healthy, Rebecca feels pressured to choose between romance with Josh, Nathaniel, and Greg. She eventually realizes that she does not yet know who she is and therefore cannot be truly happy with any of them. She instead spends a year focusing on figuring out her own emotional needs and pursuing her interest in songwriting. The series ends with Rebecca about to perform one of her own songs publicly for the first time.

== Cast and characters ==
- Rachel Bloom as Rebecca Bunch, a lawyer, originally from Scarsdale, New York. Rebecca suffers symptoms of depression and anxiety and is prone to impulsive decisions and delusions, and she tends to dissociate when she is under emotional distress. Rebecca uproots her life and relocates to the suburb of West Covina, California, in an attempt to win back her crush, Josh Chan, whom she briefly dated in a summer camp ten years prior. Intelligent but often lacking awareness of appropriate behavior, Rebecca comes across as unpredictable, selfish, self-centered, needy, and eccentric to those around her. At the same time, she often tries hard to be kind and thoughtful, and she makes loyal friends in West Covina. In the third season, she is diagnosed with borderline personality disorder (BPD) and makes positive steps towards managing her mental health and, in the fourth season, she quits her job as a lawyer, realizing it makes her unhappy, and becomes involved in songwriting.
- Vincent Rodriguez III as Josh Chan, the object of Rebecca's affections for much of the series. Josh demonstrates commitment issues in his relationship with Rebecca and is an oblivious person. Like Rebecca, Josh has a tendency to be self-centered and immature. Josh later improves as a person and apologizes to Rebecca for the mistakes he made in their relationship. He subsequently goes on a journey of self discovery as he tries to find his path and understand what he wants in life.
- Santino Fontana (seasons 1–2) and Skylar Astin (season 4) as Greg Serrano, a smart but underachieving bartender and Josh's best friend, who has complicated feelings for Rebecca. He departs West Covina to attend business school at Emory University, partly as a way to get away from his destructive relationship with Rebecca, despite his feelings for her. Although he struggles with alcoholism throughout season 1, he comes to terms with his addiction in season 2. He returns to West Covina in season 4, more emotionally healthy and played by a different actor.
- Donna Lynne Champlin as Paula Proctor (née O'Brien), Rebecca's co-worker and new best friend. As a way to distract herself from her own failing marriage, Paula hatches schemes and gives questionable advice in support of Rebecca's pursuit of Josh, mostly to compensate for her lack of fulfillment from not pursuing her dreams when she was younger. She later begins to focus instead on pursuing her law degree and establishes healthier boundaries with Rebecca, distancing herself from her past scheming. She and her husband Scott tend to be neglectful parents to their two sons.
- Pete Gardner as Darryl Whitefeather, Rebecca's sentimental, emotional and often clueless boss. A middle-aged divorced dad, he discovers he is bisexual and begins dating White Josh. He is prone to feelings of loneliness and neediness over the fact that he originally lacked strong friendships and real personal connections with others. He later forms friendships with his colleagues Maya, Nathaniel, Rebecca, and Paula, whom he considers his best friend. He and White Josh break up in the third season due to Darryl's desire to have a baby, but remain good friends. He has a baby girl carried by Heather with Rebecca's egg and names her Hebecca. Although he has a good heart, Darryl's neediness and persistence can push people away from him. In Season 4, he marries a woman named April who's the mother of his daughter's enemy.
- Vella Lovell as Heather Davis, Rebecca's cool college student neighbor and sometimes roommate. She is apathetic and sardonic, and she lacks motivation for obtaining achievement or self-sufficiency, because her parents encouraged failure and coddled her. In season 3, Heather is forced by her college to graduate, despite her wishes; she becomes a regional manager for three Home Base bars and Darryl's surrogate mother. She briefly dates Greg in season 1; in season 3, she starts a relationship with Hector, whom she eventually marries.
- Gabrielle Ruiz as Valencia Perez (seasons 2–4; recurring season 1), Josh's controlling girlfriend and Rebecca's rival for Josh's affections. She initially had a strong resistance to forming relationships with women, as she saw them as competition, making her disliked by her female peers. She has insecurity about her body image and can be condescending to people who she feels don't meet her standards. After breaking up with Josh, she questions her life choices and feels she lacks fulfillment, having devoted 15 years of her life to Josh. After Rebecca also breaks up with Josh, she and Valencia become close friends. Valencia later meets and falls in love with a woman named Beth, with whom she runs a party planning business. They get engaged by the end of Season 4.
- David Hull as Josh Wilson (season 3; recurring seasons 1–2; special guest season 4), Josh Chan's friend, a laid-back fitness instructor nicknamed "White Josh" to differentiate him from Josh Chan, who is of Filipino descent. He begins dating Darryl after the latter comes out as bisexual. White Josh tends to be judgmental, yet he is one of the most level-headed, rational characters in his social sphere. He and Darryl break up over Darryl's desire to have a baby, but stay on friendly terms.
- Scott Michael Foster as Nathaniel Plimpton III (seasons 3–4; recurring season 2), a wealthy and successful lawyer and Rebecca's new boss in season 2 after he buys equity in Whitefeather & Associates. He and Rebecca have a complicated relationship due to mutual dislike yet intense physical attraction to each other, and they explore a relationship through part of season 3. He possesses an inferiority complex, feeling that he needs to live up to his father's expectations; he tends to become self-loathing and defeatist when he fails to do so. Nathaniel exhibits some sociopathic tendencies; for example, he has suggested the murder of another character's relative as revenge. After experiencing feelings of loss and abandonment after his breakup with Rebecca, he resolves to become a kinder person. Similarly to Rebecca, he quits being a lawyer for MountainTop and starts legally representing a zoo in Season 4.

== Episodes ==
Season	Episodes	Originally released	
Season	Episodes	First released	Last released
1	18	October 12, 2015	April 18, 2016
2	13	October 21, 2016	February 3, 2017
3	13	October 13, 2017	February 16, 2018
4	18	October 12, 2018	April 5, 2019

== Production ==
=== Development ===
The series was originally developed for Showtime, and a pilot was produced, but Showtime opted not to proceed with it on February 9, 2015. The CW picked up the series on May 7, 2015, for the Fall 2015–2016 season. The series has been extensively reworked for The CW, expanding the show format from a half-hour to a full hour and adjusting the content for broadcast television, as the original pilot was produced for premium cable. On October 5, 2015, shortly before the series premiere, The CW placed an order of five additional scripts. On November 23, 2015, The CW ordered another five episodes, raising the total for season 1 to 18. On March 11, 2016, Crazy Ex-Girlfriend was renewed for a second season, along with eleven other CW series. The second season commenced on October 21, 2016. The second season is shown in the UK on Netflix with episodes available the Saturday after the U.S. airdate. On January 8, 2017, The CW renewed the series for a third season, which premiered on October 13, 2017. The CW renewed the series for the fourth and final season, which premiered on October 12, 2018.

=== Casting ===
On September 30, 2014, Santino Fontana, Donna Lynne Champlin, Vincent Rodriguez III and Michael McDonald joined Rachel Bloom in the series regular cast. With the move to The CW, the series went through casting changes and McDonald departed the cast. Shortly afterwards, Vella Lovell and Pete Gardner were added as regulars; with Lovell in the role of Heather, Rebecca's underachieving neighbor; and Gardner replacing McDonald in the role of Darryl, Rebecca's new boss.

In 2016, Gabrielle Ruiz, who portrays Valencia, was promoted to series regular for season two. In November 2016, Santino Fontana departed the series; episode four of the second season was his last as a series regular.

In 2017, David Hull and Scott Michael Foster, who portray White Josh and Nathaniel respectively, were promoted to series regulars for season three.

=== Music ===
Each episode contains two to four original songs. These are usually sung by Rebecca or a character with whom she is having a direct interaction, parodying the musical theater conceit of characters bursting into song at significant moments in the plot. In "Josh Has No Idea Where I Am", it is revealed that Rebecca has these musical fantasies out of passion for her love of musical theater. In later episodes, several other characters sing while Rebecca is not present.

A few of the songs on the show are shot twice, one clean version and an explicit version. The explicit versions are posted on Bloom's YouTube channel.

"Crazy Ex-Girlfriend: Original Television Soundtrack (Season 1 – Volume 1)" was released on February 19, 2016, in both explicit and clean versions. It includes all the songs from the first eight episodes of season one, alongside Bloom's a cappella rough demos of "Feeling Kinda Naughty", "I Have Friends", "Settle for Me," and "Sex with a Stranger" as well as Adam Schlesinger's demo version of "What'll It Be".

"Crazy Ex-Girlfriend: Original Television Soundtrack (Season 1 – Vol. 2)" was released on May 20, 2016. It includes all the songs from the last 10 episodes of season one, as well as demos of "JAP Battle", "I Could If I Wanted To", "Women Gotta Stick Together", "Group Hang", and "You Stupid Bitch".

For season two, the songs were released as singles the day of their original airing. The full season two soundtrack came out on March 3, 2017. It featured every major song from season 2, as well as two deleted songs: "It's Not Difficult to Define Miss Douche" and "Sex Toys," a solo for the recurring character Karen. It also included demos for "Santa Ana Winds", the theme song "I'm Just a Girl in Love", and "Rebecca's Reprise".

All songs in season 3 were released as singles following their airing, with the exception of "The End of the Movie," performed by Josh Groban, which was featured in the episode, "Josh's Ex-Girlfriend Is Crazy". The full album was released July 20, 2018 and includes a demo of "The End of the Movie" by Adam Schlesinger as well as a cut song, "Settle For Her (Reprise)" by Scott Michael Foster.

== Themes ==
=== Mental illness ===
Arguably the most important recurring theme of Crazy Ex-Girlfriend is the show's portrayal of mental illness and treatment. This aspect of Crazy Ex-Girlfriend has garnered wide praise both throughout the film and television industry and within the show's own fandom. Psychology Today has also acknowledged and praised this aspect of the show.

In addition to the psychological evaluation and development of Rebecca, other major characters are similarly depicted as suffering from psychological traumas that influence their personalities and relationships. Such characters include Valencia, Paula, Darryl, Greg, Nathaniel, Scott, and Heather.

This has also inspired the show's fandom to engage in discussions of mental illness, specifically regarding social stigmas and treatment of said illnesses.

=== Female sexuality and the reproductive system ===
Another defining feature of Crazy Ex-Girlfriend is its frank portrayal of female sexuality and the reproductive system, both of which serve as sources of the show's cringe humor. In Crazy Ex-Girlfriend, both topics are largely normalized in conversation. In particular, female characters are portrayed as being sexually liberated and unashamed of their sexuality. In the episode "To Josh, with Love", characters have frank and honest discussions regarding female sexuality and clitoral stimulation.

The reproductive system is given the same treatment in Crazy Ex-Girlfriend. Menstruation and diseases associated with female anatomy are often discussed without judgment. The show's open and frank approach to women's health topics is evidenced best by when Paula had an abortion in the second season and her friends and family focused on the emotional impact of her decision, rather than questioning or shaming it.

=== Parenting ===
Parenting is a major theme depicted in the show, as the personalities of several major characters are shaped by their parents' inattentive or cold, distant demeanors. In particular, Rebecca, Paula, Nathaniel, Darryl, and Greg are all affected by parents who exhibit these behaviors. Rebecca's overly critical and overbearing mother and negligent father has greatly impacted her sense of self and self esteem. In contrast, both Paula's and Nathaniel's fathers were revealed to have been emotionally abusive, resulting in both Nathaniel's inferiority complex and Paula's lack of self confidence. Greg's absentee mother after his parents' divorce resulted in him resenting her and helped Greg develop his cynical personality.

On the opposite end of this spectrum is the way Heather's parents raised her. Heather's parents were very attentive, loving and supportive to the point they coddled her and never encouraged her to make anything of herself. This resulted in Heather developing a lazy, aimless, unenthusiastic and somewhat apathetic personality, demonstrating the complexity of parenting.

== Reception ==
=== Critical reception ===
Crazy Ex-Girlfriend has received critical acclaim, with critics praising the show's writing, musical numbers and Bloom's performance. At Metacritic, which assigns a rating out of 100 to reviews from mainstream critics, the first season received an average score of 78 based on 23 reviews, which indicates "generally favorable reviews". Review aggregation website Rotten Tomatoes gave the first season a 97% positive rating, with an average rating of 7.67 out of 10 based on reviews from 58 critics, with the site's consensus stating: "Lively musical numbers and a refreshing, energetic lead, Rachel Bloom, make Crazy Ex-Girlfriend a charming, eccentric commentary on human relationships."

The second season continued to receive acclaim, with Bloom, Fontana and Champlin earning particular praise. The season holds a rating of 100% on Rotten Tomatoes, with an average rating of 9.0 out of 10 based on 15 reviews. The site's critical consensus reads, "Crazy Ex-Girlfriend remains delightfully weird, engaging, and even more courageous and confident in its sophomore outing." On Metacritic, it has a score of 86 out of 100 based on 8 reviews, indicating "universal acclaim".

The acclaim continued with season 3; this season in particular was widely praised for its portrayal of mental illness. The performances of Bloom, Champlin and Foster were particularly praised. The chemistry between Gardner's and Hull's characters was widely praised as well. The season holds a rating of 95% on Rotten Tomatoes, with an average rating of 9.0 out of 10 based on 22 reviews.

Margaret Lyons from The New York Times chose Crazy Ex-Girlfriend as one of her picks for the best TV shows of 2017. The show was also listed as one of the top shows of 2017 by numerous critics.

The critical acclaim that the show enjoyed was a factor in its renewal through four seasons, in spite of consistently low Nielsen ratings. In three of its four seasons, it finished in last place for the season in total viewers among all regularly scheduled broadcast programs. In the lone exception, the 2017–2018 season, it was next to last, behind another CW show, Life Sentence. It was last or tied for last among adults 18–49 in all four seasons. It was ultimately one of the lowest-rated shows in American television history to last four seasons.

==== Critics' year-end lists ====
2015
- No. 1 – Pittsburgh Post-Gazette
- No. 5 – Las Vegas Weekly
- No. 5 – We Got This Covered
- No. 6 – Sioux City Journal
- No. 9 – CinemaBlend
- No. 9 – Entertainment Weekly
- No. 9 – Time Out New York
- No. 10 – The Star-Ledger
- — Chicago Reader
- — Flavorwire
- — IndieWire
- — Los Angeles Times (new shows)
- — Star Tribune
- — Variety (pairs, with Jane the Virgin)

2016
- No. 1 – CinemaBlend
- No. 2 – Las Vegas Weekly
- No. 2 – The Salt Lake Tribune
- No. 3 – TV Insider
- No. 5 – The A.V. Club
- No. 5 – The Mercury News
- No. 5 – The Week
- No. 6 – Slant
- No. 6 – TVLine (comedies)
- No. 6 – Vulture
- No. 7 – Variety
- No. 8 – Flavorwire
- No. 8 – TV Guide
- No. 9 – The Daily Beast
- No. 9 – Film School Rejects
- No. 9 – Time Out New York
- No. 10 – Uproxx
- — CNN
- — Nerdist
- — Newsweek
- — The New York Times
- — The Ringer
- — ScreenCrush (honorable mention)

2017
- No. 1 – USA Today
- No. 2 – RogerEbert
- No. 2 – The Salt Lake Tribune
- No. 4 – The A.V. Club
- No. 5 – Consequence of Sound
- No. 5 – TVLine (comedies)
- No. 5 – Variety
- No. 6 – E!
- No. 6 – Las Vegas Weekly
- No. 7 – The Daily Beast
- No. 7 – Paste
- No. 8 – The Village Voice
- No. 9 – CinemaBlend
- No. 9 – Pittsburgh Post-Gazette
- No. 9 – The Mercury News
- No. 9 – TV by the Numbers
- No. 9 – Vulture
- No. 10 – Sioux City Journal
- — Associated Press
- — Metro
- — The New Yorker
- — The New York Times
- — NPR
- — PopSugar
- — Vox

2018
- No. 2 – The Salt Lake Tribune
- No. 5 – The A.V. Club
- No. 5 – TVLine (comedies)
- No. 9 – ScreenCrush
- No. 9 – USA Today
- — E!
- — MoRyan
- — NPR

=== Ratings ===
Viewership and ratings per season of Crazy Ex-Girlfriend
Season	Timeslot (ET)	Episodes	First aired		Last aired		TV season	Viewership rank	Avg. viewers (millions)	18–49 rank	Avg. 18–49 rating
Season	Timeslot (ET)	Episodes	Date	Viewers (millions)	Date	Viewers (millions)	TV season	Viewership rank	Avg. viewers (millions)	18–49 rank	Avg. 18–49 rating
1	Monday 8:00 pm	18	October 12, 2015	0.90	April 18, 2016	0.82	2015–16	195	1.03	TBD	0.4
2	Friday 9:00 pm	13	October 21, 2016	0.53	February 3, 2017	0.58	2016–17	164	0.75	TBD	0.3
3	Friday 8:00 pm	13	October 13, 2017	0.62	February 16, 2018	0.60	2017–18	206	0.80	TBD	0.3
4	Friday 9:00 pm	18	October 12, 2018	0.40	April 5, 2019	0.38	2018–19	TBD	TBD	TBD	TBD

=== Accolades ===
Year	Award	Category	Recipient(s)	Result	Ref.
2016	68th Primetime Emmy Awards	Outstanding Choreography	Kathryn Burns ("I'm So Good at Yoga", "A Boy Band Made Up of Four Joshes" and "Settle for Me")	Won	
2016	68th Primetime Emmy Awards	Outstanding Original Music and Lyrics	Adam Schlesinger, Rachel Bloom and Jack Dolgen ("Settle for Me")	Nominated	
2016	68th Primetime Emmy Awards	Outstanding Original Main Title Theme Music	Rachel Bloom and Adam Schlesinger	Nominated	
2016	68th Primetime Emmy Awards	Outstanding Single-Camera Picture Editing for a Comedy Series	Kabir Akhtar ("Josh Just Happens to Live Here")	Won	
2016	Critics' Choice Award	Best Actress in a Comedy Series	Rachel Bloom	Won	
2016	Dorian Awards	Unsung TV Show of the Year	Crazy Ex-Girlfriend	Nominated	
2016	Gold Derby Awards	Best Comedy Actress	Rachel Bloom	Nominated	
2016	Gold Derby Awards	Best Breakthrough Performer of the Year	Rachel Bloom	Nominated	
2016	Golden Globe Award	Best Actress – Television Series Musical or Comedy	Rachel Bloom	Won	
2016	Gotham Awards	Breakthrough Series – Long Form	Crazy Ex-Girlfriend	Won	
2016	HMMA Awards	Outstanding Music Supervision – Television	Jack Dolgen	Nominated	
2016	OFTA Awards	Best Actress in a Comedy Series	Rachel Bloom	Nominated	
2016	OFTA Awards	Best New Theme Song in a Series	Crazy Ex-Girlfriend	Nominated	
2016	People's Choice Awards	Favorite New TV Comedy	Crazy Ex-Girlfriend	Nominated	
2016	Poppy Awards	Best Comedy Series	Crazy Ex-Girlfriend	Nominated	
2016	Poppy Awards	Best Actress in a Comedy	Rachel Bloom	Nominated	
2016	Poppy Awards	Best Supporting Actor in a Comedy	Santino Fontana	Nominated	
2016	Poppy Awards	Best Supporting Actress in a Comedy	Donna Lynne Champlin	Nominated	
2016	TCA Awards	Outstanding Achievement in Comedy	Crazy Ex-Girlfriend	Nominated	
2016	TCA Awards	Outstanding New Program	Crazy Ex-Girlfriend	Nominated	
2016	TCA Awards	Individual Achievement in Comedy	Rachel Bloom	Won	
2016	Young Artist Award	Recurring Young Actor (13 and Under)	Steele Stebbins	Nominated	
2017	69th Primetime Emmy Awards	Outstanding Original Music And Lyrics	Adam Schlesinger, Rachel Bloom and Jack Dolgen ("We Tapped That Ass")	Nominated	
2017	Artios Awards	Best Casting in a Television Pilot and First Season Comedy	Felicia Fasano, Bernard Telsey, Tim Payne and Tara Nostramo	Won	
2017	Dorian Awards	TV Comedy of the Year	Crazy Ex-Girlfriend	Nominated	
2017	GLAAD Media Award	Outstanding Comedy Series	Crazy Ex-Girlfriend	Nominated	
2017	Gold Derby Awards	Best Comedy Series	Crazy Ex-Girlfriend	Nominated	
2017	Gold Derby Awards	Best Comedy Actress	Rachel Bloom	Nominated	
2017	Golden Globe Award	Best Actress – Television Series Musical or Comedy	Rachel Bloom	Nominated	
2017	Golden Reel Awards	Best Sound Editing – TV Short Form Musical	Crazy Ex-Girlfriend ("When Will Josh See How Cool I Am?")	Nominated	
2017	Gracie Awards	Comedy – TV National	Crazy Ex-Girlfriend	Won	
2017	Gracie Awards	Actress in a Supporting Role – Comedy or Musical	Donna Lynne Champlin	Won	
2017	Hollywood Music in Media Awards	Original Song – TV Show/Limited Series	Adam Schlesinger, Rachel Bloom, and Jack Dolgen ("We Tapped That Ass")	Nominated	
2017	Women's Image Network Awards	Outstanding Comedy Series	Crazy Ex-Girlfriend	Won	
2018	Eddie Awards	Best Edited Comedy Series (Commercial)	Kabir Akhtar and Kyla Plewes ("Josh's Ex-Girlfriend Wants Revenge")	Nominated	
2018	GLAAD Media Award	Outstanding Comedy Series	Crazy Ex-Girlfriend	Nominated	
2018	OFTA Awards	Best New Titles Sequence	Crazy Ex-Girlfriend	Nominated	
2018	TCA Awards	Individual Achievement in Comedy	Rachel Bloom	Nominated	
2019	71st Primetime Emmy Awards	Outstanding Choreography for Scripted Programming	Kathryn Burns ("Don't Be a Lawyer" and "Antidepressants Are So Not a Big Deal")	Won	
2019	71st Primetime Emmy Awards	Outstanding Music and Lyrics	Adam Schlesinger, Rachel Bloom and Jack Dolgen ("Anti-Depressants are So Not a Big Deal")	Won	
2019	71st Primetime Emmy Awards	Outstanding Original Main Title Theme Music	Rachel Bloom, Jack Dolgen, and Adam Schlesinger	Nominated	
2019	Critics' Choice Award	Best Actress in a Comedy Series	Rachel Bloom	Nominated	
2019	GLAAD Media Award	Outstanding Comedy Series	Crazy Ex-Girlfriend	Nominated	
2019	Gracie Awards	Actress in a Leading Role – Comedy or Musical	Rachel Bloom	Won	
