= Jim Cantiello =

- Born: November 22, 1981 (age 44); Long Island, New York
- Occupation: Television personality
- Years active: 2007—present
- Known for: Former correspondent on MTV News

Jim Cantiello (born November 22, 1981) is a former American television personality and former correspondent at MTV News. He was the current host of the "Tweet Beat," as well as the resident MTV News American Idol Expert, hosting weekly "American Idol in 60 Seconds" features for mtv.com. He also posted weekly musical "Glee-Caps" for each episode of Glee.

In 2009, he hosted a short lived MTV web short series called Daily Detox. The show recapped MTV reality shows. Cantiello left MTV in early 2012 and joined the Fox singing competition The X Factor during its second season as a backstage correspondent.

== Personal life ==
Jim married Jessica, his high school sweetheart, in 2006.
