= Rachel Bloom =

American actress, comedian, and singer (born 1987)

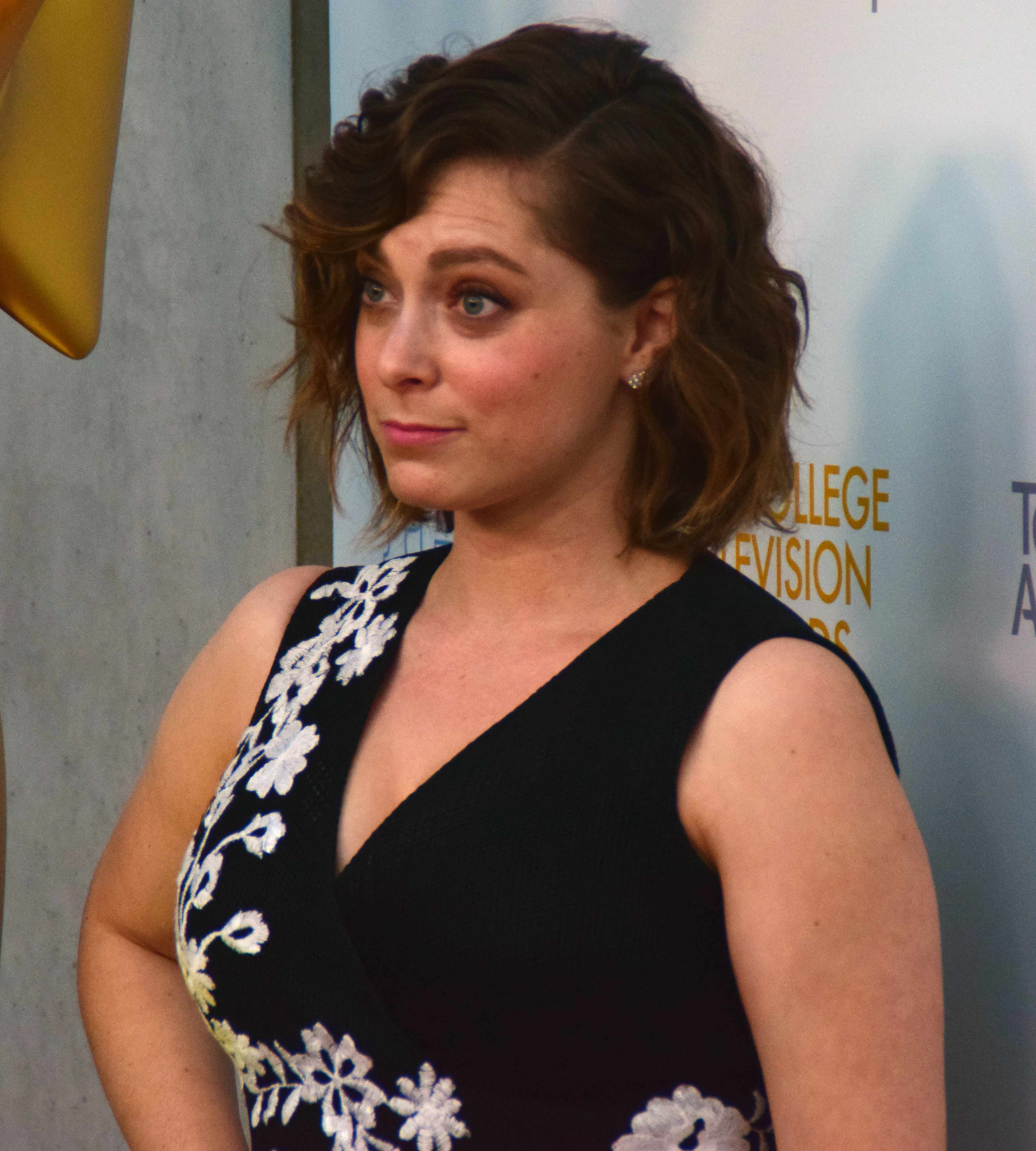
- Bloom at the 2016 College Television Awards
- Born: Rachel Leah Bloom; April 3, 1987 (age 39); Los Angeles County, California, U.S.
- Education: New York University (BFA)
- Occupations: Actress; comedian; singer; writer; producer
- Years active: 2009–present
- Spouse: Dan Gregor (m. 2015)
- Children: 1

Comedy career
- Medium: Television; film; theatre; music
- Genres: Improvisational comedy; sketch comedy; black comedy; blue comedy; musical comedy; surreal humor; satire; cringe comedy
- Website: racheldoesstuff.com

Rachel Leah Bloom (born April 3, 1987) is an American actress, comedian, singer, writer, and producer. She is best known for co-creating and starring as Rebecca Bunch in The CW musical comedy-drama series Crazy Ex-Girlfriend (2015–2019). The role has won her numerous accolades, including a Golden Globe Award, a TCA Award, a Critics' Choice Television Award, and a Primetime Emmy Award.

Bloom first became known for her YouTube comedy music videos, including the Hugo Award-nominated video "Fuck Me, Ray Bradbury" (2010). She has also appeared in films, including Most Likely to Murder (2018), The Angry Birds Movie 2 (2019), and Trolls World Tour (2020). Her one-woman stage show turned comedy special Rachel Bloom: Death, Let Me Do My Special premiered on Netflix on October 15, 2024, after successful Off-Broadway runs at both the Orpheum Theatre and Lucille Lortel Theatre. She also released a memoir titled I Want to Be Where the Normal People Are, which was published by Grand Central Publishing on November 17, 2020.

== Early life and education ==
Bloom was born on April 3, 1987, in Los Angeles County, California, and grew up in Manhattan Beach. She is the only child of Shelli (née Rosenberg), a musician, and Alan Bloom, a healthcare lawyer. She is Jewish.

She attended Manhattan Beach public schools including Mira Costa High School, where she was involved in the school's drama program. Bloom has said she used performance as a way to try to fit in. In 2009, Bloom graduated from New York University's Tisch School of the Arts with a BFA in Drama. While at NYU, she was a head writer and director with the school's sketch comedy group, Hammerkatz. During college, Bloom first performed at the Upright Citizens Brigade Theatre in New York with the group, and later on her own at its venue in Los Angeles. She was once roommates with comedian Ilana Glazer after college in Brooklyn.

== Career ==
Bloom recorded a video for her original song "Fuck Me, Ray Bradbury" in April 2010 and it was released in advance of the writer's 90th birthday in August that year. The song was inspired by Bloom's re-reading of her favorite Bradbury book, The Martian Chronicles. Done as a parody of teen pop but in tribute to Bradbury, the viral video on her "RachelDoesStuff" YouTube channel had more than 600,000 views in its first week of release and Bloom gained a following from it and her subsequent videos. The video was a finalist for the Hugo Award in 2011. A photo of Bradbury, posted online Aug. 21, 2010, purported to show him watching the video.

In college, she worked as a writer's intern at Saturday Night Live and in 2012, she unsuccessfully auditioned for the show. The audition video she submitted included a bit as Katharine Hepburn doing the voice for Bugs Bunny in Space Jam.

Bloom released her first album of musical comedy, Please Love Me, on May 13, 2013. It featured the viral songs "Fuck Me, Ray Bradbury" and "You Can Touch My Boobies". Her second album, Suck It, Christmas, was a collaboration with Dan Gregor (her husband) and Jack Dolgen. Released on November 19, 2013, the album is a comedic look at Chanukah with songs including "Chanukah Honey". Bloom provided the voice of Princess Peach in the song "Luigi's Ballad" on Starbomb's self-titled debut album, released in December 2013.

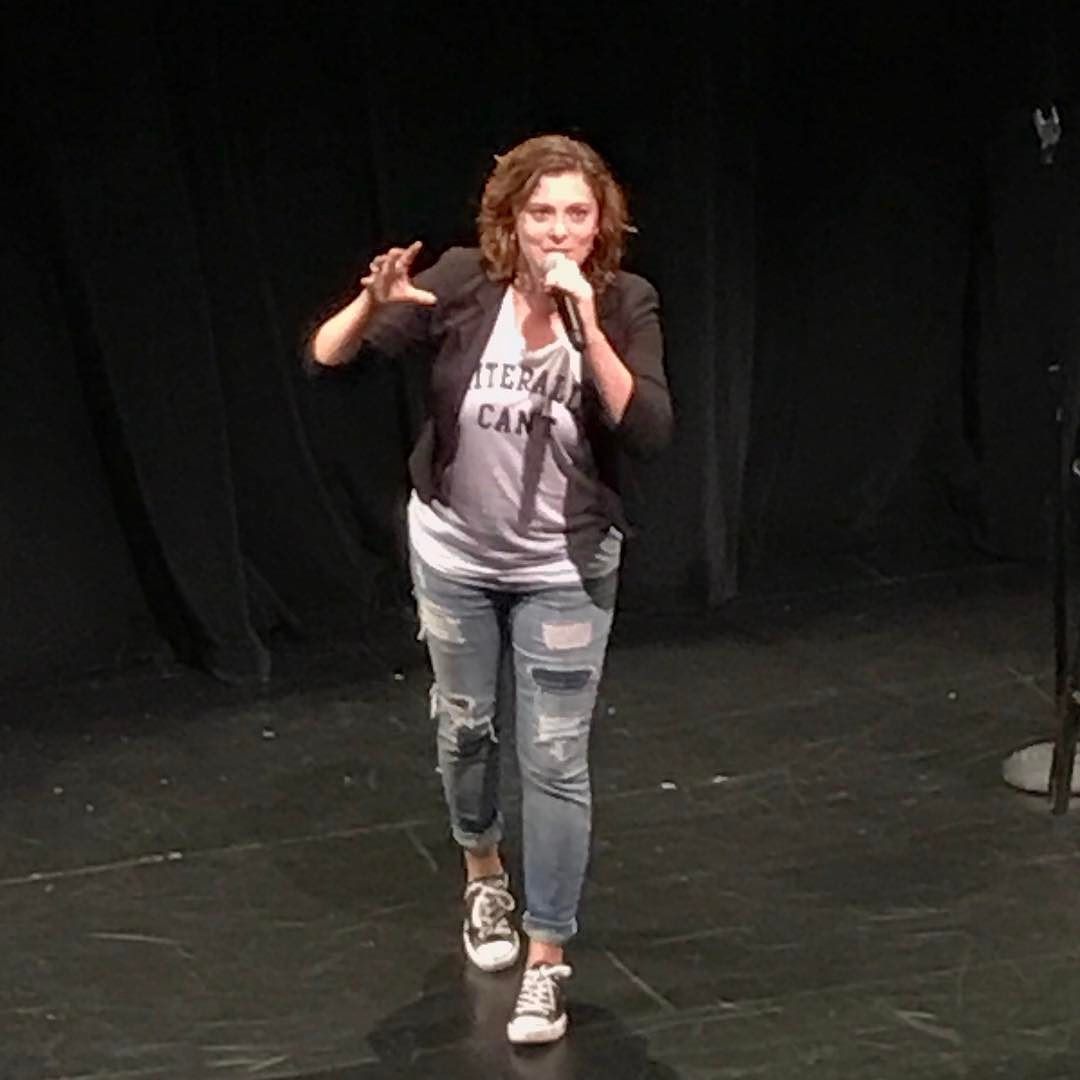
Bloom at the 2017 SF Sketchfest

A 2018 interview with Bloom

Bloom also worked as a television writer on Allen Gregory and Robot Chicken.

Bloom co-starred in the film Most Likely to Murder, opposite Adam Pally and Vincent Kartheiser. The film was directed by Dan Gregor, Bloom's husband. It premiered at the SXSW Film Festival in March 2018, and was released on Digital and on Demand in May 2018.

Bloom and her rescue dog Wiley appeared together in an #AdoptPureLove PSA for the Shelter Pet Project that began airing in 2019.

In November 2020, it was announced that Bloom would be releasing a memoir, titled I Want to Be Where the Normal People Are, published by Grand Central Publishing. The book was released on November 17, 2020. It explores Bloom's own mental health struggles and experiences with bullying, both as a child and as an adult in the entertainment industry.

In 2022, Bloom co-starred in the Hulu show, Reboot, in which she played Hannah, the bitter daughter and co-worker of Paul Reiser's character. The series, which first premiered in September 2022, was created by Steven Levitan, and was nominated for a Critics Choice Award for Best Comedy Series, and Bloom was nominated for a 2023 HCA TV Award for Best Supporting Actress in a Streaming Comedy Series.

In 2022, Bloom began touring the country with a new standup/storytelling/musical called Death, Let Me Do My Show. It then ran off-Broadway at the Lucille Lortel Theatre in September 2023 to critical acclaim. The show received an encore off-Broadway run at the Orpheum Theatre (Manhattan) in December 2023. Bloom was co-nominated for a Drama Desk Award for Original Lyrics in 2024.

Her Netflix special, Death, Let Me Do My Special was adapted from the off-Broadway show and premiered on Netflix on October 15, 2024.

Bloom made her Broadway debut in the Fall of 2026, starring as Toinette in The Imaginary Invalid at the Todd Haimes Theatre.

=== Crazy Ex-Girlfriend ===
On May 7, 2015, Bloom filmed a half-hour pilot for Showtime with co-executive producer Aline Brosh McKenna (The Devil Wears Prada), directed by Marc Webb. It was picked up by The CW for the fall 2015–2016 season. Crazy-Ex Girlfriend became a critically acclaimed hour-long series with more network-friendly content when it moved from cable to network TV and began to feature musical numbers. The show premiered on October 12, 2015, and ran until 2019.

On January 10, 2016, Bloom won the Golden Globe Award for Best Actress in a Television Series, Musical or Comedy. The following week, Bloom won the Critics' Choice Television Award for Best Actress in a Comedy Series. On September 23, 2019, Bloom won the 71st Primetime Emmy Award for Outstanding Original Music and Lyrics for her work on Crazy Ex-Girlfriend.

=== "Holy Shit (You've Got to Vote)" ===
"Holy Shit (You've Got to Vote)" is a 2016 video created by Rachel Bloom to encourage people to vote in the 2016 election. The star-filled cast sang profane lyrics directed at Donald Trump, such as "Donald Trump is human syphilis/we could be the antidote". The video caught the attention of many news outlets, though some later questioned its effectiveness.

== Personal life ==
In 2015, Bloom married her boyfriend of six years, writer, actor, producer and director Dan Gregor. Her cousin, a rabbi, performed the ceremony. They have a daughter, born in March 2020.

Bloom has a history of mental illness, having been diagnosed with depression, anxiety, and OCD, about which she has candidly spoken.

On April 25, 2016, Bloom received the Visionary Award from the East West Players at their annual gala. The award seeks to honor "individuals who have raised the visibility of the Asian Pacific American (APA) community through their craft”; her show Crazy Ex-Girlfriend was lauded for its decision to cast an Asian-American male in a trope- and stereotype-subverting lead role.

In 2016, on behalf of her work on Crazy Ex-Girlfriend, Bloom was honored by Planned Parenthood with the Excellence in Entertainment award as well as by the Los Angeles County Board of Supervisors for her work in promoting West Covina, the setting of the show. Also on behalf of Crazy Ex-Girlfriend, Bloom was given the key to the city of West Covina and raised funds for NAMI through a massive prop/costume auction. She also participated in The Unusual Suspects Theatre Company 2nd Annual CREATE-A-THON Fundraiser. In 2019, Bloom was honored by the Human Rights Campaign as an Ally for Equality, and received the Ana Huna Leadership Award from Miry's List, an organization that welcomes new arrival refugee families to America.

Bloom hosted Teen Line's 2018 Food for Thought Brunch as well as Girls Rock Camp Foundation's first annual Girls to the Front benefit. In 2022, she was involved in a push to demand abortion protections from major studios, and in August 2024, she signed an open letter asking for better disability representation in Hollywood.

On June 10, 2020, Bloom participated in the #ShareTheMicNow Instagram initiative. Fifty-two black women took over the Instagram feeds of 52 white women with large platforms, including Julia Roberts, Elizabeth Warren, and Diane von Fürstenberg to draw attention to their work to catalyze change. Bloom's Instagram account was taken over by author Christine Michel Carter.

On November 18, 2020, Bloom was awarded the Lifesaver Award from ELEM/Youth in Distress in Israel, a nonprofit aiding youth in distress in Israel, at its Hats off to Heroes virtual gala.

After the October 7 attacks in 2023, Bloom signed an open letter by Creative Community for Peace, calling for the world to "stand with Israel as it defends itself against a terrorist regime in Gaza that seeks Israel's destruction." In February 2024, Bloom headlined a comedy show raising funds to benefit Sheba Medical Center, the largest hospital in Israel, and the Koby Mandell Foundation, a charity that provides emotional support for bereaved children and their families.

== Filmography ==
=== Film ===
Year	Title	Role	Notes
2014	The Fuzz	Roxy	
2017	Click, Clack, Moo: Christmas at the Farm	Cow (voice)	
2018	Most Likely to Murder	Kara Doblowski	Also producer
2019	Changeland	Vanessa (voice)	
2019	Batman vs. Teenage Mutant Ninja Turtles	Batgirl (voice)	Direct-to-video
2019	The Angry Birds Movie 2	Silver (voice)	
2020	Trolls World Tour	Barb (voice)	
2021	Extinct	Op (voice)	
2022	Chip 'n Dale: Rescue Rangers	Various voices	
2022	The School for Good and Evil	Honora	
2022	Bar Fight!	Chelsea	
2023	Your Place or Mine	Scarlet	
2026	The Devil Wears Prada 2	Talia	
2026	Stop! That! Train!	Donna Dusk	
2026	The Angry Birds Movie 3 †	Silver (voice)	In production

=== Television ===
Year	Title	Role	Notes
2011	Allen Gregory	—N/a	Staff writer; 4 episodes
2012	How I Met Your Mother	Wanda	Episode: "The Drunk Train"
2012–2019	Robot Chicken	Various voices	10 episodes; also writer
2013	Very Mallory	Mallory	5 episodes
2013–2014	The High Fructose Adventures of Annoying Orange	Chickpea / Breakfast Pastry (voice)	2 episodes; wrote episode: "Little Cart of Scaries"
2014–2016	BoJack Horseman	Laura / Sitcom Writer (voice)	5 episodes
2014	Elf: Buddy's Musical Christmas	Additional voices	Television film
2015–2019	Crazy Ex-Girlfriend	Rebecca Bunch	Main role; also co-creator, executive producer, and writer
2016	Lip Sync Battle	Herself	Episode: "Michael Shannon vs. Rachel Bloom"
2016	Adam Ruins Everything	Herself	Episode: "Adam Ruins Hollywood"
2017	Bill Nye Saves the World	Herself	2 episodes
2017	Nightcap	Herself	Episode: "Spinster Code"
2017–2026	The Simpsons	Annette (voice)	Recurring role
2018	Portlandia	Rachel	Episode: "No Thank You"
2018	iZombie	Nellie	Episode: "My Really Fair Lady"
2018	Drunk History	Herself	Episode: "Heists"
2018	My Little Pony: Friendship Is Magic	Autumn Blaze (voice)	Episode: "Sounds of Silence"
2018	Explained	Herself / Narrator	Episode: "The Female Orgasm"
2018–2020	Muppet Babies	Dot the Dragon (voice)	2 episodes
2019	Trolls: The Beat Goes On!	Cybil (voice)	2 episodes
2020	Vampirina	Esmeralda / Crystal Ball (voice)	2 episodes
2020	Diary of a Future President	Ms. Wexler	Episode: "The National Mall"
2020	Into the Dark	Ellie Burgis	Episode: "Pooka Lives!"
2020	Gayme Show	Herself	Episode: "Acting Battle"
2020	RuPaul's Drag Race	Herself / Guest Judge	2 episodes
2021	Close Enough	Kira (voice)	Episode: "Cyber Matrix"
2021	Blue's Clues & You!	Ms. Marigold	Episode: "Blue's Show and Tell Surprise"
2021	The Chicken Squad	Rebecca (voice)	Episode: "Honey Bee Boogie Woogie"
2021	Trolls: Holiday in Harmony	Barb (voice)	TV special
2022	iCarly	McKenna Donatacci	Episode: "iCupid"
2022	Reboot	Hannah Korman	Main role
2023	The Muppets Mayhem	Samantha Swiftie	Episode: "Track 8: Virtual Insanity"
2023	Julia	Elaine Levitch	5 episodes
2024	City Island	Venus Flytrap (voice)	Episode: "Venus Flytrap"
2024	Frasier	Phoebe Glazer	Episode: "The Squash Courtship of Freddy's Father"
2024	Rachel Bloom: Death, Let Me Do My Special	Herself	Stand-up special
2024	Is It Cake? Holiday	Herself	Episode: "All-Stars Cakemas!"
2024	Dinner Time Live with David Chang	Herself	Episode: "Halloween"
2025	Bad Thoughts	Sarah	Episode: "Love"
2025	Long Story Short	Joni	Episode: "Uncle Barry"
2026	Sofia the First: Royal Magic	Queen Zora (voice)	Guest role

=== Theatre ===
Year	Title	Role	Venue
2023	Death, Let Me Do My Show Off-Broadway	Herself / One Woman Show	Lucille Lortel Theatre / Orpheum Theatre
2026	The Imaginary Invalid	Toinette	Todd Haimes Theatre

== Discography ==
=== Studio albums ===
Title	Details
Please Love Me	Released: May 20, 2013; Label: self-released; Format: Digital download
Suck It, Christmas (A Chanukah Album) (with Jack Dolgen & Dan Gregor)	Released: November 13, 2013; Label: self-released; Format: Digital download

=== Soundtrack albums ===
Title	Album Details	Peak chart positions	
Title	Album Details	US Soundtrack Sales	US Comedy
Crazy Ex-Girlfriend (Original Television Soundtrack) (Season 1, Vol. 1)	Released: February 19, 2016; Label: CBS Studios, Warner Bros., WaterTower Music; Format: CD, Digital download	–	4
Crazy Ex-Girlfriend (Original Television Soundtrack) (Season 1, Vol. 2)	Released: May 20, 2016; Label: CBS Studios, Warner Bros., WaterTower Music; Format: CD, Digital download	–	5
Crazy Ex-Girlfriend (Original Television Soundtrack) (Season 2)	Released: March 3, 2017; Label: CBS Studios, Warner Bros., WaterTower Music; Format: CD, Digital download	24	2
Crazy Ex-Girlfriend: Karaoke Album (Original Television Soundtrack) (Season 1)	Released: January 12, 2018; Label: CBS Studios, Warner Bros., WaterTower Music; Format: Digital download	–	—
Crazy Ex-Girlfriend: Season 3 (Original Television Soundtrack)	Released: July 20, 2018; Label: CBS Studios, Warner Bros., WaterTower Music; Format: Digital download	–	4
The Crazy Ex-Girlfriend Concert Special (Yes, It's Really Us Singing!)	Released: April 12, 2019; Label: CBS Studios, Warner Bros., WaterTower Music; Format: Digital download	–	9
Crazy Ex-Girlfriend: Season 4 (Original Television Soundtrack)	Released: August 1, 2019; Label: CBS Studios, Warner Bros., WaterTower Music; Format: Digital download	–	2

=== Singles ===
Year	Album	Title	Peak chart positions
Year	Album	Title	US Comedy Digital
2010	Please Love Me	"Fuck Me, Ray Bradbury"	4
2011	Please Love Me	"I Steal Pets"	—
2011	Please Love Me	"I Was a Mermaid and Now I'm a Pop Star"	—
2012	Please Love Me	"Pictures of Your Dick"	—
2012	Please Love Me	"You Can Touch My Boobies" (feat. Nicole Shabtai & Tess Paras)	—
2013	non-album single	"The Cake Farts Song (Live)"	—
2013	Suck It, Christmas!!! (A Chanukah Album)	"Chanukah Honey"	—
2014	non-album single	"Who Wants to Watch the Tony Awards This Year?"	—
2014	non-album single	"OcDance"	—
2017	non-album single	"Ladyboss"	—
2017	non-album single	"I Don't Care About Award Shows"	—

=== Other appearances ===
Year	Album	Title	Other artist(s)
2013	Starbomb	"Luigi's Ballad"	Starbomb
2014	Elf: Buddy's Musical Christmas (Original Soundtrack)	"Happy All the Time"	Fred Armisen; Ed Asner; Larry Dorf; Jim Parsons; Rachel Ramras; Kevin Schnick
2014	Elf: Buddy's Musical Christmas (Original Soundtrack)	"A Christmas Song (Reprise)"	Max Charles; Larry Dorf; Mark Hamill; Rachael MacFarlane; Kate Micucci; Rachel Ramras; Kevin Shinick; Jim Parsons
2014	Elf: Buddy's Musical Christmas (Original Soundtrack)	"The Story of Buddy the Elf"	Fred Armisen; Ed Asner; Max Charles; Larry Dorf; Gilbert Gottfried; Mark Hamill; Steve Higgins; Rachael MacFarlane; Kate Micucci; Rachel Ramras; Kevin Shinick; Jim Parsons
2019	Angry Birds 2: Original Motion Picture Soundtrack	"Silver Suite"	Heitor Pereira
2020	Trolls World Tour: Original Motion Picture Soundtrack	"Barracuda"	—N/a
2020	Trolls World Tour: Original Motion Picture Soundtrack	"Crazy Train"	—N/a
2020	Trolls World Tour: Original Motion Picture Soundtrack	"Rock You Like a Hurricane"	—N/a
2020	Trolls World Tour: Original Motion Picture Soundtrack	"Just Sing (Trolls World Tour)"	Justin Timberlake; Anna Kendrick; James Corden; Kelly Clarkson; George Clinton; Mary J. Blige; Anderson Paak; Kenan Thompson; Anthony Ramos; Red Velvet; Icona Pop; Sam Rockwell
2020	Saving for a Custom Van: A Tribute to the Music of Adam Schlesinger	"Stacy's Mom"	—N/a

=== Music videos ===
Year	Title	Role	Notes
2010	Fuck Me, Ray Bradbury	Rachel	
2011	I Steal Pets	Rachel	
2011	I Was a Mermaid and Now I'm a Pop Star	Rachel	
2011	Charlie Brown: Blockhead's Revenge	Lucy Van Pelt / Sally Brown	Produced by Funny or Die
2012	The Secret of the Gypsy Queen	Ilsa	Produced by Skeptoid Media
2012	Pictures of Your Dick	Rachel	
2012	You Can Touch My Boobies	Rachel	
2012	We Don't Need a Man	Rachel	
2013	Die When I'm Young	Rachel	
2013	If Disney Cartoons Were Historically Accurate	Princess Rachel	
2013	Chanukah Honey	Rachel	
2013	Luigi's Ballad	Princess Peach (voice)	
2014	NOBODY WILL WATCH THE F*CKING TONY AWARDS WITH ME	Rachel	
2014	The OCDance!	Rachel	
2016	Holy Shit (You've Got to Vote)	Herself	Public service advocacy with various artists
2017	Ladyboss	Rachel	Produced by Bola Ogun and Vanity Fair
2017	I Don't Care About Award Shows	Rachel	

== Awards and nominations ==
Year	Ceremony	Category	Nominated work	Result	Ref
2011	Hugo Awards	Best Dramatic Presentation	Fuck Me, Ray Bradbury	Nominated	
2013	Web Awards	Best YouTube Song	You Can Touch My Boobies	Won	
2015	67th Primetime Emmy Awards	Outstanding Short-Format Animated Program	Robot Chicken	Nominated	
2016	Golden Globe Awards	Best Actress – Television Series Musical or Comedy	Crazy Ex-Girlfriend	Won	
2016	Gold Derby Awards	Best Comedy Actress	Crazy Ex-Girlfriend	Nominated	
2016	Gold Derby Awards	Breakthrough Performer of the Year	Crazy Ex-Girlfriend	Nominated	
2016	Television Critics Association	Individual Achievement in Comedy	Crazy Ex-Girlfriend	Won	
2016	Online Film and Television Awards	Best Actress in a Comedy Series	Crazy Ex-Girlfriend	Nominated	
2016	EWwy Awards	Best Actress, Comedy	Crazy Ex-Girlfriend	Nominated	
2016	68th Primetime Emmy Awards	Outstanding Original Music and Lyrics	Crazy Ex-Girlfriend	Nominated	
2016	68th Primetime Emmy Awards	Outstanding Main Title Theme Music	Crazy Ex-Girlfriend	Nominated	
2016	Gotham Awards	Breakthrough Series – Long Form	Crazy Ex-Girlfriend	Won	
2016	Critics' Choice Television Awards	Best Actress in a Comedy Series	Crazy Ex-Girlfriend	Won	
2017	Golden Globe Awards	Best Actress – Television Series Musical or Comedy	Crazy Ex-Girlfriend	Nominated	
2017	69th Primetime Emmy Awards	Outstanding Original Music and Lyrics	Crazy Ex-Girlfriend	Nominated	
2018	Television Critics Association	Individual Achievement in Comedy	Crazy Ex-Girlfriend	Nominated	
2019	71st Primetime Emmy Awards	Outstanding Original Music and Lyrics	Crazy Ex-Girlfriend	Won	
2019	71st Primetime Emmy Awards	Outstanding Main Title Theme Music	Crazy Ex-Girlfriend	Nominated	
2023	Hollywood Creative Alliance (HCA) TV Astra Awards	Best Supporting Actress in a Streaming Comedy Series	Reboot	Nominated	
2024	Drama Desk Awards	Outstanding Lyrics	Death, Let Me Do My Show	Nominated	
2025	Critics' Choice Awards	Best Comedy Special	Death, Let Me Do My Special	Nominated	
