= Audrey Wauchope =

American TV director, producer and writer

Audrey Wauchope is an American TV director, producer and writer. She is the long term collaborative partner of fellow producer and writer Rachel Specter.

== Career ==
Wauchope began her writing career when she was 29 when she and her writing partner Rachel Specter were hired to the staff of One Tree Hill. In 2017, after the show had ended, spurred on by the Me Too Movement and accusations of sexual harassment committed by fellow The CW executive producer Andrew Kreisberg, Wauchope tweeted a thread about sexual harassment and misconduct she and Specter experienced on their first writing job. While she did not name him or the show in the thread, it was confirmed that she was referring to the creator and showrunner of One Tree Hill, Mark Schwann. Her allegations encouraged many other writers and actresses on both One Tree Hill and Schwann's then-current show, The Royals to speak out about sexual harassment they had experienced from Schwann.

Wauchope & Specter joined Crazy Ex-Girlfriend in 2015 as co-producers and writers. In 2018 the two were due to make their directorial debuts, however because of a DGA rule about directing credit only going towards established partnerships Wauchope was the only one credited as a director on the season 4 episode I Am Ashamed. Wauchope took to Twitter to salute Specter's contributions to the episode.

== Personal life ==
Wauchope married Warren Lieberstein in 2016 and has two daughters with him.. Prior to this, she was in a relationship with Ravi Patel, notable as a central part of the documentary Meet the Patels.
