= The Wonder Years season 4 =

The Wonder Years
- Season 4
- DVD cover
- No. of episodes: 23

Release
- Original network: ABC
- Original release: September 19, 1990 – May 15, 1991

Season chronology
- ← Previous; Season 3 Next → Season 5

The fourth season of The Wonder Years aired on ABC from September 19, 1990 to May 15, 1991. This season took place during Kevin Arnold's 1970–71 school year.

== Episodes ==
- Fred Savage was present for all episodes.
- Olivia d'Abo was absent for 18 episodes.
- Danica McKellar was absent for 13 episodes.
- Dan Lauria was absent for 10 episodes.
- Alley Mills was absent for 8 episodes.
- Jason Hervey was absent for 6 episodes.
- Josh Saviano was absent for 3 episodes.

No. overall	No. in season	Title	Directed by	Written by	Original release date	Prod. code	Viewers (millions)
47	1	"Growing Up"	Michael Dinner	Bob Brush	September 19, 1990	B90501	24.0
Kevin and his friends are now venturing into adolescence, as they find themselves lusting after Marsha Millany in a bikini at the town pool. Kevin and Winnie survive a summer of "cross-town romance," Wayne now owns a car that backfires, and no one likes Wayne's new girlfriend Angela (Meredith Scott Lynn). To bring the family closer, Norma suggests that the family attend Jack's company picnic on Labor Day, but the outing isn't as fun as they remember. Kevin finds out that "office clown" Harry "Dead Wood" Detweiler (Rick Hurst) beat his father out of a promotion and is now NORCOM Vice-President while boating with his daughter Mimi (Soleil Moon Frye). In the company softball game, Jack gets knocked out when Kevin accidentally hits a ball at him, but he is the one apologizing for not telling his son about the promotion. Wayne then quickly gets dumped by Angela and wonders why. However, the family comes together in the end when they see Karen off to college. Guest-starring: Soleil Moon Frye as Mimi; Meredith Scott Lynn as Wayne's new girlfriend Angela; Rick Hurst as Harry "Dead Wood" Detweiler.
48	2	"Ninth Grade Man"	Daniel Stern	Jill Gordon	September 26, 1990	B90502	22.4
As Kevin enters ninth grade, he has to make adjustments throughout his first day. He has to deal with Winnie not being there anymore, his terrible class schedule, the return of school bully Tony Barbella, who seizes his locker; a beautiful new girl named Madeline Adams (Julie Condra), who's quite the temptress when she kisses him; and worst of all, Becky Slater's continued wrath (Becky is now blaming Kevin for Craig Hobson breaking up with her before he went to military school). Kevin tries to obtain help from the school guidance counselor, but she's not there and Coach Cutlip is her replacement. His solution was to run laps, in which Kevin suddenly finds himself being chased by a girl's gym class, which gradually turns in to a one-on-one race with his nemesis, Becky Slater. After besting her, she gives him a gut punch, and he falls down. Angry at how the day played out, he tries to take back his locker from Barbella, which ends in failure. At the end of the day, he meets Winnie at the local pizza parlor. The hold each other as Madeline walks past and sees them, then walks to the jukebox, with a distressed look on her face. As Winnie relays to Kevin the difficulties of being the new girl, which Madeline had also told Kevin earlier that day. Guest-starring: Julie Condra in her first appearance as Kevin's beautiful classmate Madeline Adams; Charles Tyner as Mr Nestor Kevin's elderly industrial arts teacher; Blake Soper as an unnamed shop student; Julie Payne as Kevin's French teacher Mrs. Falcinella; Josh Berman as Harold. Recurring guests: Crystal McKellar as Becky Slater; Robert Picardo as Coach Cutlip; Tony Nitolli as Tony Barbella. Absent: Dan Lauria as Jack Arnold; Alley Mills as Norma Arnold; Olivia d'Abo as Karen Arnold; Jason Hervey as Wayne Arnold.
49	3	"The Journey"	Peter Werner	Jeffrey Stepakoff	October 3, 1990	B90503	23.1
Walter McCafferty (aka, "Mr. Hormones") claims he is unofficially invited to Donna Pescarelli's (Sarah Lundy) slumber party of tenth grade girls if they can bring beer. Kevin and his friends decide to make the journey across town to crash the party, but their battle to get there turns into a war. Paul becomes allergic to being in a different part of town; and Doug gets injured, forcing Randy to carry him the rest of the way. Then the mission is all but over when Walter gets caught taking beer by his mother and is punished for the rest of the night, but Paul insists they must continue on without him. The mission was a success and talk about their adventure. Recurring guests: Brandon Crane as Doug Porter; Michael Tricario as Randy Mitchell. Absent: Dan Lauria as Jack Arnold; Alley Mills as Norma Arnold; Olivia d'Abo as Karen Arnold; Danica McKellar as Winnie Cooper.
50	4	"The Cost of Living"	Nick Marck	Mark Levin	October 10, 1990	B90504	24.2
After Paul complains about his five-dollar allowance; Kevin asks for a raise in his, but Jack says he has to earn the value of a dollar by doing chores around the house, earning only fifty cents more. Mark Kovinski (Justin Whalin), the "Howard Hughes" of RFK, tells Kevin that he has two choices: be like his dad or be his own man by caddying at the Whispering Green golf course. Kevin then signs up for a golf caddie job in hopes of earning a twenty-dollar tip. But there are a couple problems: the tip was earned by carrying a big bag that belongs to Jack's boss Ken Stein (Alan Fudge), and Jack is playing with him. Ken is winning, and Kevin starts to admire him instead, while looking down on his seeming miser of a father. All the while, Ken is taunting Jack, which only makes Jack play better. As Ken starts losing, he becomes angry and snappy at Kevin, including making him retrieve a club that he threw in anger. Jack almost wins the game, but he deliberately misses an easy putt. Kevin is thankful, and receives a $10 tip from Ken. He treats Jack to lunch, realizing it is not so bad ending up like his father after all. Absent: Olivia d'Abo as Karen Arnold; Danica McKellar as Winnie Cooper.
51	5	"It's a Mad, Mad, Madeline World"	Rob Thompson	Eric Gilliland & Jeffrey Stepakoff	October 17, 1990	B90506	25.2
Winnie gives Kevin an ID bracelet for their one-year anniversary of their would-be date, which Kevin failed to ask her out on. Meanwhile, Kevin gets partnered with Madeline for a French cuisine cooking project in French class and has to spend an evening with her alone in her house making chocolate mousse instead of going out with Winnie. While at Madeline's, Kevin accidentally leaves his bracelet—and gets flustered when Madeline says it wasn't a coincidence that she picked him and tries to tempt him into tasting the mousse off her finger. While Kevin is at the movies with Winnie, Madeline sits behind them, but returns the bracelet by pretending that she found it on the floor. Recurring guest: Julie Condra as Madeline Adams. Absent: Dan Lauria as Jack Arnold; Alley Mills as Norma Arnold; Olivia d'Abo as Karen Arnold.
52	6	"Little Debbie"	Michael Dinner	Mark B. Perry	November 7, 1990	B90505	23.4
Now in seventh grade, Paul's little sister Debbie (Torrey Anne Cook), who has a crush on Kevin, asks him to a cotillion dance when Paul weasels out of escorting her. Paul has "school spirit" on his mind by watching busty cheerleader Dina Delgado (Stefanie Scott) with Randy and Doug at the Friday night football game. At the dance, Kevin feels out of place when he and Debbie are chosen to lead in the "Sweetheart Waltz." But when Debbie wants souvenir pictures of their night, he ditches her for some fresh air. While outside, the guys break the bad news: something slipped from Dina's uniform, revealing that she stuffs her bra. Heartbroken over Kevin's absence, Debbie finds him but her grandmother's pearl earring accidentally falls in the pool. Playing hero; Kevin dives in to retrieve it, asks her to dance, and gets their picture taken together. Guest-starring: Torrey Anne Cook in her first appearance as Paul's younger sister Debbie Pfeiffer. Recurring guests: Brandon Crane as Doug Porter; Michael Tricario as Randy Mitchell. Absent: Dan Lauria as Jack Arnold; Olivia d'Abo as Karen Arnold; Jason Hervey as Wayne Arnold; Danica McKellar as Winnie Cooper.
53	7	"The Ties that Bind"	Peter Baldwin	Mark B. Perry	November 14, 1990	B90508	24.6
In the Arnold household, money is tight and things get worse when the kitchen stove malfunctions. At work, Jack asks for a raise so he can buy Norma a new stove. To his surprise, he receives not only a raise, but a promotion as well—but there's a catch: Jack's boss is forcing him to travel during Thanksgiving, which leaves Norma in charge of preparing Thanksgiving dinner. With the realization sinking in that Jack is not present on Thanksgiving for the first time, the family is sullen. However, Jack calls Norma, and tells the family to meet him at the airport. They do, and they get to greet him and spend some time with him there. Absent: Danica McKellar as Winnie Cooper.
54	8	"The Sixth Man"	Nick Marck	David Chambers	November 28, 1990	B90507	24.1
It's tryouts time for the school basketball team; and to Kevin's surprise, Paul is among the ones chosen. However, Kevin tries to prove to Paul that he's not good enough to try out for the basketball team. But after 790 consecutive losses of backyard basketball, Paul finally shows Kevin that things change when he wins one game. Paul makes the team after all and a very impressed Kevin becomes his biggest supporter, cheering his buddy on. Absent: Olivia d'Abo as Karen Arnold.
55	9	"A Very Cutlip Christmas"	Michael Dinner	Suggested by Material by : Gene Wolande; Teleplay by : Mark Levin	December 12, 1990	B90509	20.5
While Christmas shopping with his mother, Kevin sees Coach Cutlip (Robert Picardo) moonlighting at the Brightlin Mall as Santa Claus. At school, Kevin is treated like royalty from the much kinder gift-giving "Ed" Cutlip so he wouldn't give up his secret to the rest of the class, much to the annoyance of his friends. But Kevin accidentally discloses to Doug Porter that he saw Cutlip working at the mall. Doug then tells Randy Mitchell, who in turn tells Tommy Kisling (Jay Lambert). So the boys gather a crowd to try to find Cutlip there. Rather than hide, Cutlip decides to wish the boys Merry Christmas as Santa. When they spot him, they find that they can't ridicule someone dressed as Santa Claus and pretend not to see him. Kevin notes that Christmas was the one time of year when hardnosed Coach Cutlip was allowed to make children happy. Recurring guests: Robert Picardo as Coach Cutlip; Brandon Crane as Doug Porter; Michael Tricario as Randy Mitchell. Absent: Dan Lauria as Jack Arnold; Olivia d'Abo as Karen Arnold; Jason Hervey as Wayne Arnold; Danica McKellar as Winnie Cooper.
56	10	"The Candidate"	Neal Israel	Story by : David Chambers & Eric Gilliland; Teleplay by : Eric Gilliland	January 9, 1991	B90510	22.6
Paul nominates Kevin to run for 1970 RFK Junior High Student Council President against his long-time nemesis Becky Slater. Paul then recruits Doug, Randy, and Tommy for Kevin's campaign team; but after three weeks of battling Becky at school with pranks, they're no match for Becky and her highly-organized campaign team. Tommy then tempts Kevin with a copy of Becky's election speech; but after Paul introduces him as an honest and true every-man, Kevin's conscience gets the best of him and he concedes from the race, thereby losing the election. Kevin thinks he has something in common with Richard Nixon, recalling his 1974 resignation speech. Recurring guests: Crystal McKellar as Becky Slater; Brandon Crane as Doug Porter; Michael Tricario as Randy Mitchell; Jay Lambert as Tommy Kisling. Absent: Dan Lauria as Jack Arnold; Alley Mills as Norma Arnold; Olivia d'Abo as Karen Arnold.
57	11	"Heartbreak"	Andy Tennant	David Chambers	January 16, 1991	B90511	23.2
When Kevin's school holds a joint field trip to the Natural History Museum with Lincoln Junior High, Kevin wonders why Winnie isn't as excited as he is about spending the day together. While at the museum, tensions rise when all Winnie seems to want to do is associate with her Lincoln friends. Meanwhile; Paul, Randy, and Doug try to find the museum's fourth floor where gangster John Dillinger's remains are supposedly kept in a jar of formaldehyde. When Kevin gets lost, Madeline tries to seduce him; but Winnie returns, creating an awkward moment. Kevin tries to explain that nothing happened, but Winnie confesses to Kevin that she met someone else and leaves. Kevin boards his bus and finds the ring he gave her there, and he begins to contemplate life without his "girl next door." Part one of two. Recurring guests: Julie Condra as Madeline Adams; Brandon Crane as Doug Porter; Michael Tricario as Randy Mitchell. Absent: Dan Lauria as Jack Arnold; Alley Mills as Norma Arnold; Olivia d'Abo as Karen Arnold; Jason Hervey as Wayne Arnold.
58	12	"Denial"	Richard Masur	Story by : Mark Levin & David Chambers; Teleplay by : Mark Levin	January 30, 1991	B90513	22.6
Days after the breakup, Kevin is still in denial over Winnie and cannot accept the fact she is with someone else, even when he is introduced to her new boyfriend Roger. Kevin then plans to throw a party in hopes of reuniting with Winnie and asks Paul to have the party at his house. However, Paul invites both Winnie and Roger. When Madeline discusses the party with Kevin, he asks her to be his date. At the party, Kevin uses Madeline to try to make Winnie jealous, and he ends up hurting Winnie more when he tells Winnie that their relationship didn't mean that much to him. But he also tells Madeline to get lost as well. With his heart broken, Kevin visits Winnie to apologize and to continue their friendship. Part two of two. Recurring guest: Julie Condra as Madeline Adams. Absent: Olivia d'Abo as Karen Arnold.
59	13	"Who's Aunt Rose?"	Rob Thompson	Story by : Jill Gordon; Teleplay by : Mark B. Perry	February 6, 1991	B90512	22.1
Grandpa Arnold suddenly drops by and shanghaies the family to a funeral for his cousin Rose: a relative the younger Arnolds had never met and know very little about. At the wake, Kevin and Wayne meet their extended family; both are delighted when Jack's wealthy cousin Lloyd gives the boys $20 to split. In the heat of an argument over holding the money, Kevin accidentally drops it into Aunt Rose's open casket. By the time he and Wayne concoct a plan to retrieve their cash, the casket is sealed shut and taken away for the funeral. En route to Rose's graveside service, Grandpa becomes (uncharacteristically) enraged by the brothers' bickering over the money. He stops the car and orders both boys out, hollering that anybody who can't take a funeral seriously doesn't belong there at all; Wayne and Kevin can either walk home or two miles to the cemetery, their choice. Wayne (characteristically) sneers that it was Grandpa who dragged them out to this "stupid" funeral in the first place, while Kevin remarks (to himself) how people react differently to death. Both brothers finally reach the graveside service on foot, just in time for Grandpa's eulogy on how Rose always held family - extended and otherwise - in the utmost regard...and how, even in death, she remains part of their heritage. Recurring guest: David Huddleston as Grandpa Arnold. Absent: Olivia d'Abo as Karen Arnold; Danica McKellar as Winnie Cooper; Josh Saviano as Paul Pfeiffer.
60	14	"Courage"	Daniel Stern	Mark B. Perry	February 13, 1991	B90515	22.3
After a routine cleaning and checkup at the dentist, Kevin gets his first cavity and needs a filling; but feels embarrassed that he'll wimp out in the presence of beautiful denial hygienist Miss Hasenfuss (Whitney Kershaw), and asks Dr. Tucker to make arrangements for Miss Hasenfuss not to be there for the filling. Miss Hasenfuss is then replaced by the much older, crabby, and hoarse-voiced Mrs. Craw, making Kevin feel even more uncomfortable. But after he finds out that Miss Hasenfuss is taking his advice on going back to school to become a dentist herself, Kevin has the courage to ask her to assist Dr. Tucker one last time before she leaves. Guest-starring: Whitney Kershaw as Miss Hasenfuss; Mary Gillis as Mrs. Craw; Gerrit Graham as Dr. Tucker. Recurring guests: Brandon Crane as Doug Porter; Jay Lambert as Tommy Kisling. Absent:Olivia d'Abo as Karen Arnold; Danica McKellar as Winnie Cooper.
61	15	"Buster"	Nick Marck	Story by : Jeffrey Stepakoff; Teleplay by : Jill Gordon & Mark B. Perry	February 20, 1991	B90514	21.2
Kevin's dog Buster is restless and will not stop barking, annoying the whole family; so Jack leaves it up to Kevin to take Buster to the vet. But veterinarian Dr. Ferleger's suggestion of neutering chills the Arnolds to the bone and no one can decide whether or not to move forward with the procedure. Meanwhile, Buster's misbehavior continues when he chews up Jack's shoes and important reports. Kevin then takes Buster to the park, where Buster finds a female dog and runs away with her, leaving the family to search for him later that night. They soon realize that Buster is a part of the Arnold clan, too—their faithful "silent partner." Absent: Olivia d'Abo as Karen Arnold; Danica McKellar as Winnie Cooper.
62	16	"Road Trip"	Ken Topolsky	David Chambers	February 27, 1991	B90516	20.6
After Norma notices a clothing sale advertisement in the paper; she urges Jack to take Kevin to the store where the sale is being held—which is a one-hour drive away—to buy him a new suit. However, due to Jack's stubbornness to get driving directions, Kevin is unable to connect with his father and they miss the turnoff and get lost in the countryside. Jack and Kevin then stop at a diner, where a cute waitress works, but Jack embarrasses Kevin in front of her. They finally make it to the store, but it's now late and the store is closing. In the parking lot, Jack's car gets a flat tire, leaving Jack and Kevin at odds with each other once again. However, Kevin manages to get the jammed lug nut free and changes the tire by himself, impressing his father and restoring their ability to communicate. Absent: Olivia d'Abo as Karen Arnold; Danica McKellar as Winnie Cooper; Josh Saviano as Paul Pfeiffer.
63	17	"When Worlds Collide"	Lyndall Hobbs	Eric Gilliland	March 20, 1991	B90517	23.2
Norma takes a job as a temporary secretary in the front office at Kevin's school, making Kevin nervous about his school image and reputation. On her first day, during a fire drill, Norma also embarrasses Kevin by waving and shouting hello at him from across the schoolyard. As a result, Kevin asks Norma not to speak to him while at school, which she reluctantly agrees to. The next day, school bully Tony Barbella pressures Kevin to steal a green late pass, but Norma catches Kevin in the act and he leaves it behind. However, Norma is unable to perform her duties suitably and is fired by Mr. Diperna, anyway. Later that night, however, Kevin notices Norma typing an application for admission to Rider Community College. Recurring guest: Tony Nitolli as Tony Barbella. Absent: Olivia d'Abo as Karen Arnold; Danica McKellar as Winnie Cooper.
64	18	"Separate Rooms"	Michael Dinner	Story by : Jill Gordon & Bob Brush; Teleplay by : Bob Brush	April 3, 1991	B90518	21.4
Karen returns home from college for a mid-semester break and informs the family that she won't be back for summer because she has gotten a job on campus. Kevin and Wayne's shared bedroom is becoming too cramped for the both of them, and although both of them would love to have separate bedrooms, but neither of them is willing to move out. The situation slowly becomes so heated, that Jack declares that neither of them will get the room, and Wayne decides to sleep in his car rather than spend one more night in the same room with Kevin. Kevin, shocked by his brother's hateful comments, gets even when he kicks the bumper off Wayne's car, accidentally causing it to roll down the street and crash into a hydrant. After the incident, they each admit wanting the room; but in the end, Jack flips a coin and Wayne wins the toss—and Karen's room. Absent: Danica McKellar as Winnie Cooper.
65	19	"The Yearbook"	Neal Israel	David Chambers	April 10, 1991	B90519	17.4
After Kevin wittingly covers for them after getting caught passing a note; Brad Patterson (Chad Allen) and Marci Doran, the "most popular" couple in school, recruits Kevin to help with writing quotes for the yearbook. That night they ask Kevin to provide a "funny" quote about unpopular overweight classmate Peter Armbruster (Michael Ray Bower), known as "Pig." and Kevin comes up with "Let's eat!" and later "Oink! Oink!" In gym class; Kevin gets partnered with Peter for exercise drills, which gives Kevin an opportunity to get to know Peter, who actually is a very nice guy with a good sense of humor. Kevin starts to feel guilty about the quote he submitted to Brad and Marci about Peter. Kevin then asks them to change his quotes; but it's too late, as they have already submitted the quotes to the yearbook staff. Kevin subsequently gets called in to Mr. Diperna's office and finds that he has to take the blame for the quote, (which did not make the yearbook), and will be receiving detention for it. Keven later confronts Brad and Marci for selling him out, but realizes that they are "untouchable" but there's more to life than being popular. Guest-starring: Chad Allen as Brad Patterson; Michael Ray Bower as Peter "Pig" Armbruster. Recurring guest: Raye Birk as Mr. Diperna. Absent: Dan Lauria as Jack Arnold; Alley Mills as Norma Arnold; Olivia d'Abo as Karen Arnold; Jason Hervey as Wayne Arnold; Danica McKellar as Winnie Cooper.
66	20	"The Accident"	Richard Masur	Story by : Jill Gordon & Bob Brush; Teleplay by : Jill Gordon	April 24, 1991	B90520	18.3
When Winnie shows up at Kevin's house to "talk," he tries to chat but she is evasive. Kevin learns that Winnie broke up with Roger, and Paul thinks that she may want to get back together with Kevin. Later, Kevin meets Winnie as she is looking at her old house, but she isn't interested in doing anything with Kevin. Later, at a skating rink, Winnie's "distress" cannot be seen in front of her new friends—a couple of eleventh grade guys. Realizing Winnie's instability, Kevin tries to talk with her but she again becomes evasive, wanting to forget the last three years. Later, Kevin learns that Winnie had been involved in a car accident. Kevin leaves school and waits until dark for Winnie, but her parents tell him that she doesn't want to see him right now. Kevin then sneaks back to see her later that night, and they mouth "I love you" to each other through her bedroom window. Absent: Dan Lauria as Jack Arnold; Olivia d'Abo as Karen Arnold; Jason Hervey as Wayne Arnold.
67	21	"The House that Jack Built"	Ken Topolsky	Mark B. Perry & Mark Levin	May 1, 1991	B90521	15.5
The "clash of the generations" between Jack and Karen resurfaces when Karen informs the family that she intends to move into an old house, that will need some repairs, but will actually cost less than living in the college dorms. Norma and Jack want to check it out, and bring Kevin along to help her fix it up. But they are surprised when they meet Karen's new roommate—her new live-in boyfriend Michael (David Schwimmer), Their living together doesn't sit well with Jack, and when Karen accidentally reveals they sleep in the same bedroom, Jack has to take a walk to think things over. Meanwhile, Kevin goes for a motorcycle ride with Michael, and notices his love for his sister, and comes to accept it. However, after returning from his walk, Jack says he can't tolerate this kind of relationship and demands Karen to return to the dorms. However, Karen defies her father and tells him that times have changed, even if he cannot. Jack furiously declares that this is not how he and Norma raised their daughter to live, and he furiously leaves with Norma and Kevin, rebuking Karen's values. Guest-starring: David Schwimmer in his first appearance as Karen's new live-in boyfriend Michael. Absent: Danica McKellar as Winnie Cooper; Josh Saviano as Paul Pfeiffer.
68	22	"Graduation"	Michael Dinner	Bob Brush	May 8, 1991	B90522	15.6
As his junior high graduation approaches, Kevin learns from Winnie that Paul will be attending a prep school in the fall. Disappointed, Kevin confronts Paul, making fun of him in the process; then later punches him in science class, causing an explosion. Later, a pregnant Mrs. Heimer sees that Kevin is troubled and offers him a ride home, but their conversation is interrupted when Mrs. Heimer goes into labor, leaving an unlicensed Kevin to drive her to the hospital. Kevin, however, makes it back in time for his graduation, and is moved by Paul's speech about remembering their time as RFK Junior High's class of 1971, and never forgetting the friends that were made there. That summer; Kevin patches things up with Paul, Winnie's car accident injury heals and she has her cast removed, and the three look forward to the future. Recurring guest: Wendel Meldrum in her final appearance as Miss White aka Mrs. Heimer and also final appearances of Ben Stein as Mr. Cantwell, Raye Birk as Mr. Diperna, Crystal McKellar as Becky Slater, Robert Picardo as Coach Cutlip Brandon Crane as Doug Porter and Tony Nitolli as Tony Barbella Absent: Olivia d'Abo as Karen Arnold.
69	23	"The Wonder Years: Looking Back..."	Nick Marck	Mark B. Perry & Mark Levin	May 15, 1991	B90523	14.3
Kevin recalls significant people, places, and events in his life (through clips from past episodes). The majority of his memories center around his family, his three years at RFK Junior High, his best friend Paul, and his first love Winnie.
