= The Wonder Years season 5 =

The Wonder Years
- Season 5
- DVD cover
- No. of episodes: 24

Release
- Original network: ABC
- Original release: October 2, 1991 – May 13, 1992

Season chronology
- ← Previous; Season 4 Next → Season 6

The fifth season of The Wonder Years aired on ABC from October 2, 1991 to May 13, 1992. During this season, many changes took place on the show. For example, Kevin and Paul go to new separate schools and Kevin's voice changes. This season took place during Kevin's 1971–72 school year.

== Episodes ==
- Fred Savage was present for all episodes.
- Olivia d'Abo was absent for 21 episodes.
- Danica McKellar was absent for 17 episodes.
- Dan Lauria was absent for 5 episodes.
- Alley Mills was absent for 5 episodes.
- Jason Hervey was absent for 4 episodes.
- Josh Saviano was absent for 9 episodes.

No. overall	No. in season	Title	Directed by	Written by	Original release date	Prod. code	Viewers (millions)
70	1	"The Lake"	Michael Dinner	Mark Levin	October 2, 1991	02S0059101	23.5
The Arnolds spend their summer vacation at Lake Wenatchee with the Pfeiffers, with both fathers trying their hand at fishing. Kevin and Paul quickly become bored, so they decide to take a tour of the small town when Kevin spots a beautiful young girl. That night they pay Wayne and his new buddy Dave "Wart" Wirtschafter (Scott Menville) for a night at the drive-in to see Planet of the Apes. The beautiful girl Kevin saw earlier, now introduced as Cara (Lisa Gerber), also shows up at the drive-in; and Kevin decides to introduce himself and have a conversation with her. For the rest of his one-week vacation, Kevin spends all his evenings with Cara, leaving his family and "Mr. Hormones" Paul (with his 25-cent condom in tow) behind, and romance develops between the two. But with the vacation coming to an end, Kevin and Cara realize that their summer romance must end as quickly as it began. Guest-starring: Scott Menville as Wayne's new friend Dave "Wart" Wirtschafter; Lisa Gerber as Cara. Recurring guest: Torrey Ann Cook as Debbie Pfeiffer.
71	2	"Day One"	Daniel Stern	Denise Moss & Sy Dukane	October 9, 1991	02S0059102	23.4
It's Kevin's first day of tenth grade at McKinley High School. Feeling alone without his best friend Paul, who's gone to prep school, the day goes from bad to worse. First, Kevin meets an old bothersome fourth grade classmate, Stuart Cartesian, whose not-so-decent reminiscing turns off a would-be pretty girlfriend for Kevin. Later at lunch, Kevin finds Winnie alone, but before Kevin can make his way to the table to join her, she is surrounded by the football team. Soon after, Wayne and Wart give Kevin a "royal flush" because he accidentally stepped on the sacred school seal. Finally, Kevin's U.S. Government teacher Mr. (Arlo) Bottner (Scott Jaeck) begins a vendetta against him when he disobeys "Bottner's Rules" in class. Kevin rips out a page from his spiral notebook—a sound Bottner despises; and to his surprise, his classmates do the same. Kevin realizes maybe he's not so alone after all. Guest-starring: Scott Jaeck as Kevin's government teacher Mr. Bottner. Recurring guest: Scott Menville as Wart.
72	3	"The Hardware Store"	Ken Topolsky	Craig Hoffman	October 16, 1991	02S0059103	21.7
After Jack gets him a summer job at Harris & Sons Hardware in town, Kevin dislikes the way his boss, Mr. Harris, orders him around. Meanwhile; Kevin, Paul, and their new friend Lewis begin hanging out at Hillcrest Mall and they see a classmate, Robby Cashion, surrounded by girls while working at the Burger Cage, which of course inspires Kevin to want to work there, too. Kevin tries to quit his job at the hardware store several times, but Mr. Harris offers to pay Kevin more than what the Burger Cage would offer him, making him feel obligated to stay. Later, when Kevin sees that his father would rather go to the mall because it's more convenient, he realizes that the world is passing his slow-paced employer by. So Kevin takes the job at Burger Cage (although he quits there a month later), and in later life he remembers the old-fashioned service ethic that Mr. Harris represented.
73	4	"Frank and Denise"	David Greenwalt	David Greenwalt	October 23, 1991	02S0059104	20.5
Kevin meets Frank Stanavukovic and Denise Lavel, better known as Frank "The Stank" and Denise "The Grease," a couple whose love soared above all others at his high school. However, their long-time romance is on the rocks, and Kevin finds himself in the middle, especially after he helps Denise understand the Jonathan Swift poem "Cadenus and Vanessa" in poetry class. Frank becomes agitated by it, but soon finds out it's not Kevin's fault; it's his own, and he starts to open up to Denise. At the drive-thru where Denise works, Kevin has Frank recite poetry, but when that doesn't work he instead sings a verse from his favorite song "If I Were A Carpenter," which gets their relationship back on track.
74	5	"Full Moon Rising"	Ken Topolsky	Mark B. Perry	November 6, 1991	02S0059105	20.5
When Kevin has a date with classmate Cindy (Heather McComb), his friends Randy and Purdle make fun of him for having his mom drive Kevin and his dates everywhere. Kevin and his friends then approach Ricky Halsenbach (Scott Nemes), the first kid in their class to turn sixteen and get his driver's license, to chauffeur them around. Kevin then breaks his date with Cindy, making up a lie that his grandmother is ill to go cruising with his friends on a Friday night; but their glorious night fades when they encounter a group of guys in a Mustang, who go around mooning people. Shortly afterwards, Kevin runs into Cindy at Zesty's Drive-in, who catches Kevin in a lie and becomes crushed. Later, Ricky is challenged by the guys in the Mustang to a drag race, but dutifully stops at a four-way stop sign. And if all that wasn't bad enough, Purdle moons Kevin's parents of all people at a traffic light, causing Kevin to flip out in extreme anger and embarrassment. As the boys decide to go home, a final insult was added to their injury as the car runs out of gas, leaving them to push the car home; but in spite of it all, the guys realize their night out was an adventure and agree to do it again next Friday. Guest-starring: Heather McComb as Cindy; Scott Nemes in his first appearance as Ricky Holsenbach.
75	6	"Triangle"	Daniel Stern	Sy Rosen	November 13, 1991	02S0059106	22.8
Kevin creates a dilemma with Wayne and his new girlfriend, Sandy (Carla Gugino), after Sandy falls for Kevin while watching an episode of Sonny and Cher on TV, thereby beginning a secret relationship between them. Kevin feels Wayne is not the right guy for Sandy, thinking she's too smart and beautiful for him. But when Kevin notices Sandy making Wayne a better person, he backs off. Later, Kevin asks a schoolmate, Alice Pedermeir (Lindsay Sloane), to the school dance, but she already has a date. Meanwhile, Sandy prefers to be with the younger, more sensitive brother; so she breaks up with Wayne in the parking lot at the dance. Now Kevin is faced with an ultimatum—ditch his brother to be with his ex-girlfriend or comfort his big brother when he needs it the most. Kevin realizes that blood is thicker than water, putting family first, and leaves Sandy to dance with another guy. Guest-starring: Lindsay Sloane as Alice Pedermeir; Carla Gugino as Wayne's new girlfriend Sandy.
76	7	"Soccer"	Thomas Schlamme	Mark Levin	November 20, 1991	02S0059107	22.5
When Kevin tries out for the football team and gets cut because of his size, he discovers the new sport of soccer, where the school's misfit team welcome him. After meeting disgruntled coach Pops "The Bear" McIntyre (Paul Dooley), who is best known for his championship football days, Kevin joins the team. The players train as best they can, but Kevin soon becomes frustrated with the team's lackluster coach and their team's lack of skills. On game day, their high hopes are dashed when faced with a superior opponent. But Pops takes interest again after hearing Kevin's inspirational speech, and even though they lose 19–0, the team chemistry is what's important. Guest-starring: Brice Beckham as Nick Bott; Paul Dooley as Pops "The Bear" McIntyre.
77	8	"Dinner Out"	Bryan Gordon	Gina Goldman	November 27, 1991	02S0059108	19.8
Six months after Jack and Karen's fallout (from "The House That Jack Built" in Season 4), Norma decides to try to reconcile their relationship. To celebrate Jack's 43rd birthday, the family decides to go out to dinner at Briarcliff Lodge, a restaurant of Jack's choosing, and Kevin decides to secretly surprise the family by picking up the tab with his summer job savings. However, dinner doesn't go as planned: For starters, Karen arrives separately with live-in boyfriend Michael—on his souped-up motorcycle, much to Jack's chagrin. Then the Maitre D' seats the Arnolds—and Michael—at a small table that's too cramped up for them, and Jack continues to spar with Karen over Michael. The high point of the night is when Norma presents Jack with a photo album gift, but things go downhill from there. Afterwards, however, stubborn Jack and headstrong Karen feel badly about the farce and reconcile in the end. This makes Kevin realize that what his father really needed for his birthday was his daughter's goodwill more so than gifts. Recurring guest: David Schwimmer as Michael.
78	9	"Christmas Party"	Jim McBride	Sy Dukane & Denise Moss	December 11, 1991	02S0059110	20.2
The Arnolds host their annual Christmas party, but they notice that things just aren't as fun as they used to be. Jack's old golf buddy Lou arrives with his wife, Jeanne (Carol Mansell), but he has now stopped drinking. Al Wannamaker has a coughing attack after Kevin's impromptu Jimmy Cagney imitation. Jack's old war buddy Bill Foster arrives with his new young girlfriend Carol (Kimberley Kates) instead of Marsha, his now ex-wife. To top it all off, Ed Ermin, the "King of Lawns," is caught smoking marijuana in the basement. Meanwhile, Kevin and Wayne are sent to the supermarket; and when they return they find their parents alone and curled up by the fire; they realize, also, that the old days are gone, and the present-day Kevin narrates that this party was the last such party his parents had.
79	10	"Pfeiffers' Pfortune"	Ken Topolsky	Mark B. Perry	December 18, 1991	02S0059109	18.7
Tension arises between the Arnolds and the Pfeiffers after Alvin (Paul's father) makes a windfall gain by investing in beach front property; and a jealous Jack is irked by Alvin's spending spree: a color TV with remote, a riding mower, a swimming pool, and a country club membership. This situation also puts Kevin and Paul's friendship to the test as well, heightened when Kevin learns that Jack also could have joined the investment deal. At the country club, the "cold war" continues while Kevin and Paul are playing tennis. Kevin envisions in his mind a butler giving a stylishly-dressed Paul a tennis ball on a silver platter. The imagination sends Kevin into a fit of jealousy, which causes him to hit the ball with such force that it strays and hits Paul in the head. Back at poolside, Paul is nursing his head as Norma graciously proposes a goodwill toast celebrating the Pfeiffers' success. However, Alvin begins sobbing and tells everyone that he has actually lost everything. Back home, Kevin decides to meet Paul, apologizes about the stray tennis ball that hit Paul, and they patch things up. Paul then drops out of prep school and joins Kevin at McKinley High. Recurring guest: Torrey Anne Cook as Debbie Pfeiffer.
80	11	"Road Test"	Thomas Schlamme	Craig Hoffman	January 8, 1992	02S0059111	21.2
Kevin seems to be a natural at driving, except for one problem—his inability to parallel park. This troubles him in driver's education class, especially when other student drivers—under the watchful eye of Coach Meecham (Michael Gregory)—have no problem with it. Then one day Jack has Kevin drive him downtown to run an errand so that he can stay in practice for his upcoming road test, but Kevin freezes up in fear when Jack has him parallel park in front of the store. Kevin's tension continues to build until he lies to his parents about getting his driver's license, even though they celebrate by giving him a cake and a set of spare keys to the car. Determined to secretly practice, Kevin sneaks out of bed in the middle of the night to try to use the car to parallel park; but only ends up running over the lawn mower, damaging it in the process. Jack comes out to see what's happened, and Kevin finally confesses all. In the end, Kevin gets his license with his father's help, but is subsequently grounded for a month for damaging the mower. Guest-starring: Michael Gregory as Coach Meecham, Alicia Silverstone as Jessica Recurring guest: Lindsay Sloane as Alice Pedermier.
81	12	"Grandpa's Car"	Michael Dinner	Mark Levin	January 15, 1992	02S0059112	21.7
After having several recent auto accidents that led to a license suspension, Grandpa Arnold (David Huddleston) refuses to listen to his family's concerns and refrain from driving while suspended. Frustrated, Grandpa finally asks Kevin to drive him back home, but resumes driving the car a short time later anyway. Their road trip takes many unexpected turns as Grandpa wishes to relive his cruising days, traveling to his favorite diners and roadside attractions. For the first time, Kevin notices Grandpa's old age catching up with him; and while reminiscing about the old days and not paying attention to the road, he nearly crashes the car. Grandpa finally accepts the fact that he's getting too old to drive and sells Kevin his 1965 Oldsmobile Cutlass--for one dollar. Now Kevin will always remember his first car because it was his grandfather's last. Recurring guest: David Huddleston as Grandpa Arnold.
82	13	"Kodachrome"	David Greenwalt	Gina Goldman	January 29, 1992	02S0059113	20.2
Kevin's new English teacher Miss Shaw (Lanei Chapman) is a young, active teacher fresh out of grad school. In her idealism, she decides not to adhere to regular teaching practice—a move that makes her well-respected among most of her students, including Kevin. While the class enjoys her unorthodox curriculum and grading system ("P" for pass, "NP" for no pass), it doesn't sit well with parents and school principal Dr. Valenti (Richard Fancy). Dr. Valenti informs Miss Shaw that she must conform to departmental guidelines. Thinking the young activist in Miss Shaw will fight the system, Kevin is surprised when she tells him that "It's just not worth it" and resigns, leaving Kevin unsure of what to make of the situation.
83	14	"Private Butthead"	Nick Marck	Sy Rosen	February 5, 1992	02S0059114	21.8
While cramming again for his SATs, Wayne begins to give up on the prospect of going to college. Meanwhile, Kevin thinks of his own future when his guidance counselor, Mrs. Ruebner (Pat Crawford Brown), also urges him to start planning for college. Finally, rather than taking the tests again; Wayne, along with his buddy Wart, decides to join the Army instead. With the Vietnam War still raging in 1972, the family is afraid that Wayne could be shipped off in combat. Although Jack objects to his son's decision; Wayne—since he is now 18 years old—is allowed to go and take the physical. However, Wayne is rejected due to psoriasis while Wart is accepted, then sent to basic at Fort Polk in Louisiana, and two months later shipped off to Vietnam.
84	15	"Of Mastodons and Men"	Thomas Schlamme	Mark Levin	February 12, 1992	02S0059116	17.9
Kevin is caught between spending time with Julie Aidem (Wendy Cox) a girl he's been dating, and hanging out with the guys. Although Kevin admires Julie's cool dad Ben (Lyman Ward), he notices that her mother June (Sandy Faison) has Ben on a short leash, and he soon realizes Julie is doing the same with Kevin. Suddenly Kevin feels trapped, and he ditches Julie to play football with the guys; however, Julie shows up at the Arnolds', wanting Kevin to go steady with her. Julie then wants Kevin to formally announce their courtship at the Aidem dinner table; but he can't bring himself to do so, especially after Ben tells him about Duke, his old black lab, that ran away the day he proposed to June. Kevin then sternly breaks off his and Julie's relationship in front of her family, devastating Julie in the process, and returns to doing what most 16-year-old boys like to do: hanging out with the guys.
85	16	"Double Double Date"	Peter Baldwin	Sy Rosen & Mark B. Perry	February 26, 1992	02S0059115	22.9
Kevin becomes smitten with new Swedish exchange student Inga Finnstrom (Shevonne Durkin), and asks Winnie to introduce her; and in return, Winnie asks Kevin to fix her up with Matt Stevens. Things seem to go well initially, but become awkward when Matt suggests they double date for the spring formal. On the way to the dance, tensions rise between Kevin and Winnie, until Matt asks Inga for a dance leaving Kevin and Winnie alone on the dance floor. While slow dancing, something strange happens between Kevin and Winnie and they are soon brought close together once again. They then ditch their dim-witted dates and go to a secluded parking spot outside of town, but both find it hard to make a move and wind up kissing each other—on the eye. Both understand that they need more time, particularly since there is still much they have yet to learn about themselves.
86	17	"Hero"	Stephen Cragg	David Greenwalt	March 11, 1992	02S0059117	18.8
McKinley High's basketball team is having a great season thanks to their star player, Bobby Riddle (James Caviezel) and advance to postseason play upon winning their conference championship of 1972. Kevin and his school are caught up in the euphoria. Jack, however, is more practical, telling Kevin he needs to focus on his studies instead. On the night of the playoffs, Jack decides to accompany Kevin to the game. He enjoys the first half, but Kevin is annoyed when the team loses and is embarrassed when Bobby tells him to leave him alone. On the way home, at a diner, Jack teaches Kevin a valuable lesson he never forgets, when he says "It's not easy being a hero."--his father wasn't talking about Bobby, he was talking about himself.
87	18	"Lunch Stories"	Ken Topolsky	Sy Dukane & Denise Moss	March 18, 1992	02S0059118	19.2
The present-day Kevin recalls a typical lunch period at McKinley High through a montage of events—academic crises, romances, and problem-solving. For example, Kevin is asked by Winnie to donate blood, while Ricky has to complete a thousand word paper on the A Day in the Life of a Citizen in Ancient Rome. Paul gets sloppy Joe sauce on his white pants right before a big debate, and Chuck wants to ask Shelia McCaffry out on a date, but when he finally does, his constant twitching turns her off. Wayne tries to win a $20 bet by finding the name of a kid known only as "Maniac" – he succeeds but "Florence" threatens to kill him if he tells. Kevin is also pressured into ditching school to see The Devil in Miss Jones with three troublemakers, Jimmy Donnelly (Seth Green), Joey Spinoza, and Neal Pemish, but they are caught by Dr. Valenti and blame Kevin – only for Winnie to save the day when she mentions donating blood.
88	19	"Carnal Knowledge"	Nancy Cooperstein	David Greenwalt	March 25, 1992	02S0059119	19.3
Kevin and his friends plan to sneak in to see the R-rated movie Carnal Knowledge with Ann-Margret, because it contains erotic scenes. Paul reveals that he will be having dinner with his mother's old college roommate and her college-age daughter Beth (Kawena Charlot) that night and can't make it. After Kevin, Ricky, and Chuck sneak in and subsequently get kicked out of the theater, Paul reveals his own "carnal knowledge" to Kevin when he tells him he had his first sexual encounter with Beth, leaving him confused at exactly what happened. At first Kevin is upset when Paul doesn't disclose any details, then he inadvertently reveals Paul's secret to his friends. However, when Paul confesses he can't cope with a casual relationship, Kevin helps out and accompanies him to the airport to say goodbye to Beth. Even though Paul didn't have the chance to meet Beth there before she boarded the plane (he thought he did see her through the plane window, however), he still appreciates Kevin, his long-time best friend, who'll do anything for him
89	20	"The Lost Weekend"	Arthur Albert	Story by : Rob Cohen; Teleplay by : Sivert Glarum & Stephen Jenkins	April 8, 1992	02S0059120	16.3
When Kevin's parents leave town for the weekend—and Wayne leaves the house, also—Kevin's friends talk him into letting them come over for a night of poker. When their poker game becomes boring, Chuck decides to invite a girl he likes, and Ricky also steps up and invites Alice. Unfortunately for Kevin, Alice also invites her friends, who bring or invite their siblings or friends, eventually causing things to get out of hand, and a wild party ensues. As supplies run low, Kevin and Chuck make a run to a convenience store in an attempt to purchase alcoholic beverages; but the clerk (Michael G. Hagerty) doesn't fall for Chuck's fake ID. When they return; they find total chaos, as the house is now trashed. Kevin futilely spends three hours cleaning up afterwards, but his parents return early and are shocked by what they find, and automatically blame Wayne. But Kevin is taken aback when Wayne takes the rap for the carnage—but Kevin has to wash and wax Wayne's car in exchange for getting off scot-free. Recurring guest: Lindsay Sloane as Alice Pedermier.
90	21	"Stormy Weather"	Ken Topolsky	Denise Moss & Sy Dukane	April 22, 1992	02S0059121	17.2
When Karen unexpectedly comes home in the middle of the night, the rest of the family soon learns she and Michael had a fight, and of her plan to move back home. Karen then asks Jack to collect her belongings from hers and Michael's house and Kevin and Wayne are soon roped in, too. After collecting Karen's belongings, Jack tells Michael he didn't want to see them living like this, but Michael divulges the reason for the fight—he had asked Karen to marry him. Michael then follows Jack and the boys home to see Karen, but she again rebuffs his overtures since she doesn't believe in the "antiquated, male-centered institution" of marriage. She then asks him to leave; however, when Michael returns with his tent and pitches it on the Arnolds' front lawn, he stands in the dark in the pouring rain waiting for Karen to come out. Eventually, Karen realizes how much Michael loves her and goes outside to make up—and ten days later, she asks Michael to marry her.
91	22	"The Wedding"	Peter Baldwin	Mark B. Perry	April 29, 1992	02S0059122	15.3
With their wedding day approaching; Karen and Michael, despite Norma's enthusiasm, decide against a traditional ceremony. Instead, they plan a hippie wedding with an Indian Maharishi and all their friends in the backyard. However, Kevin becomes uncomfortable when Michael confides in him he got a job in Alaska and they are planning to move there right after the ceremony. But Karen has yet to find a good moment to tell her parents, and when Jack makes a touching speech, Karen's friend Earth Mother delivers a cake that has written on it in decorative cake icing "Alaska or Bust." In the confusion and tension, Karen then tells her parents she and Michael have their own life, and they have to let them go and live it. They ultimately agree, particularly when Jack recalls that he took his own bride far from her family. Jack and Norma then allow their first-born daughter out into the real world, reminding her that irrespective of where she is, they will never let her go. Guest-starring: David Schwimmer as Michael. Guest starring Jon Frear as Brett, Frank Lloyd as Rainbow, Karen Massey as Wind, and Gerry Bednob as Maharishi.
92	23	"Back to the Lake"	Michael Dinner	Mark Levin	May 6, 1992	02S0059123	17.1
As summer begins, Wayne gets a job at Jack's company NORCOM, working on the loading dock. Kevin is frustrated with missing out on a leisurely summer since his parents are pressuring him get a summer job, also. With Winnie working at a diner and Paul working as an assistant manager at a Chinese restaurant; Kevin finally takes a remedial position at the Chinese restaurant as well. One day, while cleaning his room, Kevin finds a card from Cara, his summer fling from last year; and on the way to work with Paul the next day, Kevin spontaneously decides to go back to the lake with hopes of reuniting with Cara. But Cara isn't thrilled to see Kevin and wonders why he came, since he never replied to her Christmas card. Cara then leaves, and the next day (the boys having spent the night in the car) tells Kevin that she now has a boyfriend. Kevin then wonders why he ever tried to get back together with Cara in the first place, when he still has Winnie. Recurring guest: Lisa Gerber as Cara.
93	24	"Broken Hearts and Burgers"	Ken Topolsky	Craig Hoffman	May 13, 1992	02S0059124	15.8
When a jealous Winnie thinks Kevin had gotten a little too friendly with a waitress (Sarah Dammann) at Fatso's drive-in, she berates Kevin and abandons him at the table and joins her friends for the rest of the night. Even though Kevin explains that it was just a misunderstanding, he remembers back to a lot of ups and downs he had with Winnie and other girls he knew in his past (through clips from past episodes). Although his friends and Wayne try to help him out, it's no use, and Kevin has to patch things up with Winnie himself. By the end of the evening, Kevin speaks from his heart by telling Winnie that she's the only girl he ever cares and thinks about. But Winnie's heard enough and takes Kevin into her arms with a passionate kiss—all she wanted to hear was some honesty. Recurring guests: Scott Nemes as Ricky Halsenbach, Andy Berman as Chuck Coleman, Michael Tricario as Randy Mitchell Guest star: Sarah Dammann as the unnamed waitress
