= The Wonder Years season 6 =

The Wonder Years
- Season 6
- DVD cover
- No. of episodes: 22

Release
- Original network: ABC
- Original release: September 23, 1992 – May 12, 1993

Season chronology
- ← Previous; Season 5

The sixth and final season of The Wonder Years aired on ABC from September 23, 1992 to May 12, 1993. This season took place during 1972–73, Kevin Arnold's second-to-last year of high school and into the start of the summer.

== Episodes ==
- Fred Savage was present for all episodes
- Danica McKellar was present for 19 episodes
- Dan Lauria was present for 17 episodes
- Jason Hervey was present for 15 episodes
- Alley Mills was present for 14 episodes
- Josh Saviano was present for 10 episodes
- Olivia d'Abo guest stars in the final episode
- Recurring guests include Paula Marshall as Bonnie Douglas, Giovanni Ribisi as Jeff Billings, Scott Menville as David "Wart" Wirtshafter, Michael Paul Chan as Mr. Chong, and Lindsay Sloane as Alice Piedermier.

No. overall	No. in season	Title	Directed by	Written by	Original release date	Prod. code	Viewers (millions)
94	1	"Homecoming"	Michael Dinner	Bob Brush	September 23, 1992	02S0059202	15.9
Kevin is now in the eleventh grade, alongside girlfriend Winnie; and Paul, who is now class president. Becoming bored with his routine school life, Kevin becomes a wise guy in school like his new friend, Jeff Billings (Giovanni Ribisi). After McKinley's rival school steals McKinley's knight mascot, Kevin tries to make a name for himself when he steals—and eventually frees—the rival's owl mascot. Kevin is also now the delivery guy at Mr. Chong's, having to advertise the business on his car, making Winnie embarrassed to ride with him. Wayne now works in the mailroom at NORCOM, and has moved from sharing Kevin's room to living in the family basement. Meanwhile; Wayne's old buddy, David "Wart" Wirtshafter, returns home from a tour in Vietnam a changed man. But he doesn't feel welcome at the big high school football game when an anonymous shout of "murderer" is directed at him, apparently from a war protester. Kevin and Wayne later find Wart sitting alone in the stadium's parking lot in his underwear, with his clothes folded neatly on the ground. When Wayne goes to see what is wrong, a tearful Wart tells him nothing seems to fit any more; however, he wasn't referring to the size of his clothes. Even so, Wayne offers Wart the shirt off his own back. Guest starring: Giovanni Ribisi as Jeff Billings; Don Perry as Kevin's history teacher Mr. Deeks. Recurring guests: Scott Menville as David "Wart" Wirtshafter; Michael Paul Chan as Mr. Chong.
95	2	"Fishing"	Greg Beeman	Phil Doran	September 30, 1992	02S0059203	16.3
Kevin and Wayne reluctantly join Jack for their final tri-annual weekend fishing trip and some male bonding at Berlinger Falls, Jack's beloved secluded fishing hole. However, during a stop at the bait shop for fishing supplies, the woman at the counter tells the guys the road leading there is now closed and no longer accessible, and Jack's once-beloved secret spot is now isolated and overgrown. However, that doesn't stop Jack from risking damage to his car and driving there. Meanwhile, Kevin becomes annoyed at Jack and Wayne still treating him like a child, joking at his expense and rebuffing his attempts at having a beer. Irked, Kevin tells his father that his lifelong dream of building a retirement cabin in the area would never happen. Kevin tries to prank Wayne for teasing him, but Jack takes the bait, and becomes miffed. Things then go from bad to worse when Wayne and Kevin start fighting, causing their tent to go up in flames. But by the next morning they figure out why they went there in the first place: to say goodbye to a time and place full of shared and sentimental memories. Absent: Alley Mills as Norma Arnold; Danica McKellar as Winnie Cooper; Josh Saviano as Paul Pfeiffer.
96	3	"Scenes from a Wedding"	Michael Dinner	Story by : Michael Curtis & Greg Malins; Teleplay by : Jon Harmon Feldman	October 7, 1992	02S0059204	15.7
The Arnolds are invited to the wedding of Candy Jensen, the daughter of Jack's boss Arthur. Later, at the reception, Wayne tries to make small talk with Candy, whom Wayne dated before she met her new husband; however, for some reason, Candy haughtily ignores Wayne. Jack becomes frustrated with Arthur, who had been flirting with Norma the whole night; but Jack finally lays down the law ("If you don't get your arm off my wife, I'm gonna break it off!"). Meanwhile, Kevin tries to impress Linda Carr, a girl he met at the reception, by telling her he can get champagne, even though he's too young to be served—but somehow still manages to obtain a full bottle of champagne. Linda then tells Kevin to meet her at the gazebo. However, Linda stands up Kevin, who helps himself to the bubbly and ultimately gets drunk; and when Linda finally shows up, Kevin throws up on her. After the groom's final speech, Wayne tells Kevin that even though the groom had "waited" until he got married, the bride certainly didn't (indicating that she had sex with Wayne—hence her cold-shoulder treatment of him). Absent: Josh Saviano as Paul Pfeiffer. Guest starring: Tom Wood as Peter Rotelli (the groom); Aimee Graham as Candy Jensen (the bride); Paul Gleason as Arthur Jensen; Sara Melson as Linda Carr.
97	4	"Sex and Economics"	Ken Topolsky	Story by : John Bunzel; Teleplay by : Jon Harmon Feldman	October 14, 1992	02S0059201	17.5
Despite having an after-school job, Kevin's financial hardship is taking a toll on his life. When his young and beautiful history teacher Miss Farmer (Rebecca Staab) posts an ad on the school bulletin for a painting job, Kevin quickly accepts. Miss Farmer informs Kevin that she will pay him $500, but Kevin will have to furnish the paint and supplies. Thinking the job will be easy, Kevin is surprised when he is told he needs to paint the whole exterior of the house. This makes Kevin realize he needs to hire a crew to help him tackle this time-consuming job. He lowballs his closest friends, who in turn rebuff him. So he desperately recruits Jimmy Donnelly, Joey Spinoza, and Eddie Horvath (Jeremy Davies), three unmotivated slackers who do minimal work. Between their salary and the cost of paint and supplies, Kevin's cash soon disappears. Kevin is further frustrated when the prepaid hired help suddenly quits, leaving him to finish the job alone. Kevin then learns that Miss Farmer sold the house to Mr. Kaplan (Jack McGee). Miss Farmer laments on wanting to move because so many locals in the neighborhood wanted to take advantage of a young, single woman. Kevin tries to get out of finishing the house, but Miss Farmer stated that they had a deal. Mr. Kaplan is unwilling to front Kevin any money for the deal he made with Miss Farmer, given that he just paid $15,000 over the appraisal value for the house, anyway. Kevin learns his lesson—namely of being taken advantage of by a beautiful woman, who in turn took advantage of Mr. Kaplan, just as Kevin had attempted to take advantage of his own friends. And that perhaps, everyone was taking advantage of everyone else. He finished the job six weeks later, with $214 of his own money spent. Absent: Josh Saviano as Paul Pfeiffer. Guest starring: Rebecca Staab as Miss Farmer; William Bronder as Mr. Glidden (paint store clerk); Jeremy Davies as Eddie Horvath; Michael Weiner as Dominick; Jack McGee as Mr. Kaplan.
98	5	"Politics as Usual"	Bryan Gordon	Craig Hoffman	October 21, 1992	02S0059205	16.0
When Kevin's high school holds a debate for the McGovern/Nixon presidential race, the students don't seem to be interested until Mike Detweiller (Lance Guest), a charismatic speaker heading Senator George McGovern's local campaign, gets everyone's attention with his anti-establishment views. Winnie enthusiastically joins the McGovern campaign committee; but Kevin is unconvinced, believing that Mike has a romantic interest in Winnie. Suspicious, Kevin breaks into campaign headquarters late at night and catches Mike and Winnie together; but it only turns out to be a meeting with McGovern himself. The next day, seeing the early promising returns, Kevin celebrates with the team; but it was premature as Nixon soon wins convincingly. Kevin arrives to find Winnie upset, as Mike leaves with his assistant Peggy. It seems Mike wasn't interested in Winnie after all; he only wanted to harness her enthusiasm to encourage young people to become more politically motivated. The present-day Kevin narrated that from that point on, Winnie would remain a liberal. Guest starring: Lance Guest as Mike Detweiller; Renee Faia as Peggy Kimball.
99	6	"White Lies"	Peter Baldwin	Jon Harmon Feldman & Robin Riordan	October 28, 1992	02S0059206	18.5
Kevin is feeling pressure from the guys in the locker room to reveal intimate details of his and Winnie's relationship, since they have been together for six years now. Kevin then sees an opportunity to be alone with Winnie at his house when his parents take a trip out of town for a night, so he asks her over to study for the SATs. Surprisingly, Winnie agrees; and even though Kevin creates a darkened romantic atmosphere, Winnie still wants to study, but finally figures out Kevin's intentions. Despite Kevin's attempts at intimacy, he and Winnie end up doing what they always do—reminiscing about their past. They end up falling asleep together on the couch while watching a Humphrey Bogart movie and Kevin panics the next morning after he fully wakes up and discovers Winnie on the couch, still asleep. After Winnie tells her parents where she was all night, and how much they trust him, Kevin feels frustrated. The guys catch wind of Kevin's mood in gym class; and when the guys pressure Kevin to share with them the details of his night with Winnie, he tells them to "use their imagination." By lunchtime, the cafeteria is ablaze with gossip, publicly shaming Winnie. That night, at Jack's command, Kevin goes to Winnie's to apologize, but Winnie cannot see how to fix the unfixable. Kevin is left alone to ponder how readily he hurt the person most important to him in trying to impress those who weren't. Absent: Jason Hervey as Wayne Arnold; Josh Saviano as Paul Pfeiffer. Guest starring: Chance Quinn as Kenny Steuben; Jason Horst as Jay.
100	7	"Wayne and Bonnie"	Greg Beeman	Sy Rosen	November 4, 1992	02S0059207	16.9
Wayne begins dating Bonnie Douglas (Paula Marshall), an older co-worker whom he met on the job. Over dinner, the family finds out Bonnie is 23 years old and divorced with a six-month old son named David. Norma then invites them to the NORCOM family picnic and learns that Wayne is serious about their relationship—so much so that he decides to move in with Bonnie and help her take care of David. Meanwhile, still upset over Winnie apparently holding a grudge and not being in his life for the past few weeks, Kevin tries to make up with Winnie by buying a gift. But when he goes to her house with a huge teddy bear, Kevin was stunned when he discovered that Winnie had over a classmate for a study date. Later, seeing Winnie and her study date at a diner together, Kevin feels lonely but meets a girl at an adjacent booth named Cindy, who just moved into town. Kevin then invites Cindy to the picnic—but is later shocked to discover that her immature behavior is due to the fact she's only in the seventh grade and still in junior high. As the day winds down and the Arnolds are about to leave the picnic, Kevin notices Wayne arguing with Norma over his wishes to move in with Bonnie. During this, Cindy notices the big bear in the open trunk of Jack's car intended for Winnie and Kevin gives it to Cindy instead. With all this happening to his family, Kevin needs someone to talk to; so again he turns to Winnie, who in return now seems willing to give their relationship another chance. Absent: Josh Saviano as Paul Pfeiffer. Guest starring: Paula Marshall in her first appearance as Bonnie Douglas; Bret Anthony as Phil; Heather Allen as Cindy Fleming.
101	8	"Kevin Delivers"	Arthur Albert	Frank Renzulli	November 18, 1992	02S0059208	14.6
With his two-night-a-week Chinese food delivery job at Chong's Restaurant, Kevin has difficulty making time to be with Winnie; particularly as his high-handed boss, Mr. Chong (Michael Paul Chan), is always ordering him around. Every night had its pitfalls and perils, from scary houses and scary customers and yapping dogs, to practical jokes with competitor Fioni's Pizza's deliveryman (delivering to a dead person at a funeral home), and having his car impounded. Kevin also has regular customers, including Mrs. Tambora, a lonely old lady who always wants Kevin to stay and visit. But it's not all bad, particularly when a hippie stoner gives him a twenty-dollar tip, or when Kevin decides to retaliate on the pizza guy by pranking him into delivering to Mrs. Tambora. Throughout the night, Kevin often contacts Winnie by phone; but one night she breaks their date. Then Mr. Chong informs Kevin of one last delivery to 216 Maple, which turns out to be a local park; but to Kevin's surprise the food was ordered by Winnie, who shows up for a late dinner date in the park. Winnie figured it was the only way she could be with Kevin with his demanding job. Absent: Dan Lauria as Jack Arnold; Alley Mills as Norma Arnold; Jason Hervey as Wayne Arnold; Josh Saviano as Paul Pfeiffer. Guest starring: Ellen Albertini Dow as Fanny Tambora; Adam Stradlin as the unnamed pizza delivery guy; Zachary Mott as the unnamed stoned hippie. Recurring guest: Michael Paul Chan as Mr. Chong.
102	9	"The Test"	Ken Topolsky	Robin Riordan	November 25, 1992	02S0059209	14.1
Kevin and his friends deal with the stress of preparing for the SATs, and contemplating their futures. Unfortunately, Paul is not helpful, particularly when he starts to panic and begins to focus on how the test will predetermine the rest of his life, and Kevin's procrastination while watching Let's Make a Deal does not help either. In the episode's subplot, after Jack receives a performance evaluation at NORCOM he feels was mediocre, he contemplates resigning his position with the company. Jack mentions how Charlie, a former co-worker, is planning to buy a furniture company; but fails to keep Norma in the loop about wanting to join Charlie in the venture and forming a partnership. After running into Charlie at an ice cream parlor, Norma finds out Jack's intentions; and with her support, Jack meets with the owners of the factory and finally seals the deal. Empowered by Jack's example of taking a risk, Kevin takes his SATs, knowing that he won't let his life be dictated only by the results. Absent: Jason Hervey as Wayne Arnold. Guest Starring: Monty Hall as Mr. Glavin, Kevin's English comprehension teacher; John Pleshette as Charlie Barrett.
103	10	"Let Nothing You Dismay"	Ken Topolsky	Craig Hoffman	December 16, 1992	02S0059210	13.0
December 1972 marks a time of transitions in the Arnold household. Norma graduates from Fremont Community College and Kevin has his own problems trying to get a raise from his boss Mr. Chong so he can buy Winnie a $100 cashmere sweater for Christmas. Meanwhile, the newly-unemployed Jack focuses on a new future when he and his old NORCOM buddy Charlie try to secure a bank loan to finance their furniture factory business. However, despite being the holiday season, Charlie gets cold feet and backs out of the deal at the last minute, deciding to return to the safety of steady employment at NORCOM. This prompts Jack to give up on the quest as well; but with Norma's encouragement and help, Jack manages to secure the loan and enjoy the festive season after all. In the end, Kevin buys Winnie her sweater, but all he receives in return is the new Bread album, Baby I'm-a Want You, despite telling his friends earlier in the episode that he didn't like the band. Recurring guests: Paula Marshall as Bonnie Douglas; John Pleshette as Charlie Barrett.
104	11	"New Years"	Tom Moore	Jon Harmon Feldman	January 6, 1993	02S0059211	16.2
Kevin's notices Wayne evolving from the simple self-centered older brother he grew up with into a diligent and focused family man. Wayne and his single-mother divorced girlfriend Bonnie are now becoming serious about their relationship, and Jack and Norma slowly warm to the idea. Wayne plans a family get-together at a supper club on New Year's Eve and invites the rest of the family, along with Winnie, at his expense. Kevin balks at this invitation, as it would conflict with his plans to go to a New Year's party at a ski condo in the mountains; but at the command of his parents, he reluctantly accepts Wayne's invitation. On the big night, the Arnolds and Winnie are there, but Wayne never shows up. Kevin then learns from Bonnie that she and Wayne broke up since she still has feelings for her ex-husband James, the father of her son, David. Kevin and Winnie set out searching for Wayne and eventually find him drinking beer at the laundromat. But at midnight; Kevin, Winnie, and Wayne watch the ball drop on TV in Times Square, marking a new beginning for everyone. Wayne and Bonnie broke up and Wayne moved back home. Guest Starring: Lou Cutell as the unnamed stand-up comedian; Richard Diamond as magician Zanic the Magnificent. Recurring guest: Paula Marshall in her final appearance as Bonnie Douglas.
105	12	"Alice in Autoland"	Arthur Albert	Robin Riordan	January 13, 1993	02S0059212	17.8
When Kevin starts having car trouble, he learns that Chuck's on-again-off-again girlfriend Alice is the daughter of "Pistol Pete" Pedermier, a used car salesman known as the "Used Car Cowboy," and she asks her dad to try to give Kevin a good deal on a trade. However, when Alice dumps Chuck (for the 29th time), Kevin has second thoughts about accepting her offer. But when this irritates Alice, Kevin reconsiders and accompanies her to Pedermier's Autoland to test drive a flashy red 1960 Austin Healey Sprite. Alice joins Kevin on the test drive and reveals to Kevin that she had a crush on him since they first met and hugs him at a traffic light just as Chuck pulls up alongside and notices them in the middle of their embrace. Kevin shouts out to Chuck that it wasn't what it seemed and that Alice didn't mean anything to him; however, Chuck drives off in a state of shock. The next day at school, Kevin tries to explain what really happened; but after Alice feeds Chuck a reversed story of what happened (that Kevin forced himself on her instead of Alice throwing herself at him), Chuck punches Kevin in the face, leveling him to the floor. The school's worst couple is back together again; and to add insult to injury, Kevin never did get that convertible. Kevin learned another life lesson about couples is stay out of it. Luckily he got his old car back and about broken down cars always bring a wrench. Guest-starring: Victor Raider-Wexler as "Pistol" Pete Pedermier, Alice's father. Recurring guest: Lindsay Sloane as Alice Pedermier. Absent: Dan Lauria as Jack Arnold; Alley Mills as Norma Arnold; Jason Hervey as Wayne Arnold.
106	13	"Ladies and Gentlemen...The Rolling Stones"	Peter Baldwin	Kim Friese	February 3, 1993	02S0059213	N/A
In the winter of 1973, a rumor spreads through McKinley High that The Rolling Stones will be appearing at Joe's Place, a dive bar about an hour away out on Highway 9. Even though Kevin doesn't believe the rumor; Winnie, Paul, Jeff, and Chuck talk him into venturing out there to see for themselves. After getting a speeding ticket on Vine Street, Kevin tried to conceal it from his parents, but Norma finds the ticket in his laundry. Since Jack and Norma made plans to go square dancing with their friends on the same night; Jack punishes Kevin to go, when he found out how he fast he was speeding when he got the ticket and gesturing to him not move his car "one inch off its oil spot." So Kevin, using impeccable teenage logic, takes Jack's car instead, with the intention of "buying some milk." Since he said not to move his car, but he didn't say not his. When they finally get to Joe's, the parking lot is empty. After being pulled over by police again, Winnie saves the day by making up an excuse, and they follow the trail to Wally's Inn, where they find a large crowd gathered outside; but the crowd is shooed away by Wally the owner. Then in frustration, Kevin inadvertently backs into a parked car, and the night ends in despair. He makes it back home before his parents arrive, and is saved again when Zeke accidentally hits the car. Kevin is relieved and surprised when Norma confesses she dented the car as well. It turns out to be a great evening, despite the fact that the Stones did indeed appear at Joe's after all (as indicated by their tour bus parked in front of Joe's and British-accent voices conducting a sound check in the final scene). Guest Starring: O'Neal Compton as Zeke; Tom McCleister as Wally.
107	14	"Unpacking"	Greg Beeman	Sy Rosen & Bob Brush	February 10, 1993	02S0059214	14.3
After chemistry class; Kevin, Winnie, and Winnie's new friend Ann Sheer, a new student, meet for lunch in the cafeteria; and knowing Jeff is lonely, Kevin and Winnie fix him up with Ann. However, Jeff, whose parents have just divorced, is skeptical about committing to a potential relationship with Ann because of his attachment to Julie, the long-time girlfriend he left behind—although Jeff and Ann begin to have feelings for each other. The four of them then go out for a friendly evening of miniature golf; but Jeff leaves early when Winnie suggests they all go to "the Point," the local romantic hangout for teens. Attempting to discuss the matter, Kevin is initially annoyed by Jeff's sarcasm and joking; but soon realizes the situation when Jeff sternly tells him the truth. On the following Saturday, when Jack has Kevin go to the hardware store to pick up brackets for a gutter that fell off the house, he encounters Jeff in the driveway, who asks Kevin for a ride back to his former home, 110 miles away. While driving around Jeff's old hometown; Jeff didn't really want to go back home, but was frustrated about having to leave his life behind. While there, Jeff meets Julie at the local diner and says goodbye to her one last time. Kevin, returning six hours late, didn't pick up the gutter brackets, infuriating Jack. But more importantly than that; Jeff decides to unpack his room, reconsiders a potential relationship with Ann, and starts his life anew. Guest Starring: Alisa Scheindlin as Ann Sheer; Bruce Ed Morrow as the unnamed chemistry teacher; Marine Andrews as Mrs. Billings, Jeff's mother.
108	15	"Hulk Arnold"	Ken Topolsky	Kim Friese	February 17, 1993	02S0059215	20.8
After pinning all his classmates in gym class, Kevin is invited to try out for the wrestling team by Coach Silva, the team's tough, no-nonsense coach. Even though Wayne and Jack think he's not committed enough to be on the team, Kevin persists when Chuck, Jeff, and Winnie pressure him into competing. At his first practice, Coach Silva tests Kevin against Spider, the smallest and lightest teammate; and Kevin soon realizes his gym class performance is relatively weak. After Kevin constantly complains and makes excuses, Coach Silva himself challenges Kevin; but when he doesn't surrender easily, he actually makes the team. Thinking Kevin will only sit on the bench, Coach Silva makes a change; and Kevin is matched in the 140 pound weight class against the Spartans' Doug Gurney, whose wrestling prowess is well-known. During the match, Kevin surprisingly scores two points; and when Doug whispers in his ear, "Give up, and make it easy on yourself," Kevin doesn't do so and his shoulder never touches the mat once, getting by on his natural ability from gym class. Even though he loses 15–2 in front of his friends and father, Kevin quips to Coach Silva, "Told you I was good," thereby earning Coach Silva's respect. Guest Starring: James Tolkan as Coach Silva; Matt Blansett as Doug Gurney. Absent: Alley Mills as Norma Arnold; Josh Saviano as Paul Pfeiffer.
109	16	"Nose"	David Greenwalt	Sy Rosen	February 24, 1993	02S0059216	14.2
Frustrated with his lack of social skills with girls; Ricky confides in the guys, wondering what's wrong with him and why he can't get dates. Enter Hayley Green, a new student whom Ricky is instantly smitten with. After some encouragement from Kevin and the guys, Ricky finally asks Hayley to the spring dance. However, Hayley has an oversized nose; and Kevin, Jeff, and Chuck can't help but make fun of it. In English class, teacher Mr. Arkinson asks Hayley to read her paper about something that really bothers her about herself. Thinking to face her problem head-on, she jokes how her weakness is shopping because no matter how hard she tries, nothing really matches her nose but she accepted it because that's who she is. Her presentation backfires when the class laughs at her instead, leaving Ricky embarrassed. So Ricky backs out by lying about having to take his cousin to the hospital for an operation on her webbed feet. At the dance, Hayley still shows up, and Kevin encourages Ricky to tell her the truth. Ricky then asks Hayley to dance, but she came with a date—class president and captain of the football team Brett Davis, who was moved by her speech in class. Apparently, Hayley simply knew herself and accepted who she was, unlike everyone else in school. Guest Starring: Renee Humphrey as Hayley Green; David Brisbin as English teacher Mr. Arkinson; Eric Dane as Brett. Absent: Dan Lauria as Jack Arnold; Alley Mills as Norma Arnold; Jason Hervey as Wayne Arnold; Josh Saviano as Paul Pfeiffer. Note: The scene where Ricky lies about his cousin's webbed feet to break his dance date with Hayley was undoubtedly a reworking of the scene in "Full Moon Rising" from Season 5 where Kevin lies to Cindy about his grandmother's liver to break their date so he can go cruising with the guys.
110	17	"Eclipse"	Stephen Cragg	Craig Hoffman	March 3, 1993	02S0059217	16.9
Kevin and his classmates take a field trip to the Nierman Planetarium to witness the total solar eclipse of March 21, 1973. On the way, Kevin and Winnie bicker during a Truth or Dare game when he calls her "too perfect." Chuck's results aren't so great with Alice either; and during a pit stop, Chuck accidentally gets locked in a rest area bathroom, and is left behind. Because of the Truth or Dare farce, Winnie is so frustrated over being a "nice girl" that she throws a spitball at science teacher Mr. Plenitzer, who doesn't believe she did it when she openly confesses; so she resorts to (supposedly) taking a hat from the gift shop. Meanwhile, at the planetarium, Kevin reluctantly agrees to help Louis Lanahan flush a cherry bomb down the toilet of the men's room during the eclipse viewing. Also, Mary Jo Genaro, the class "bad girl," bets her friends Sheila and Cindy twenty-five dollars that she can give class nerd Harlan Abramson a hickey; and they wind up having feelings for each other as a result. On the way back from the field trip, Winnie confesses to Kevin that she actually paid for the souvenir hat, proving that she's still Kevin's perfect girl after all. Guest Starring: A. J. Langer as Mary Jo; Devon Odessa as Sheila; Timothy Stack as the science teacher. Recurring guest: Lindsay Sloane in her final appearance as Alice Pedermier. Absent Dan Lauria as Jack Arnold; Alley Mills as Norma Arnold; Jason Hervey as Wayne Arnold; Josh Saviano as Paul Pfeiffer.
111	18	"Poker"	David Greenwalt	Story by : Max Mutchnick & David Kohan; Teleplay by : Jon Harmon Feldman	March 31, 1993	02S0059218	13.6
When Kevin and the guys get together for a Friday night of poker, each of them discuss their current problems: Chuck is worried that Alice may be pregnant, Randy is concerned that he will not pass eleventh grade, and Jeff is accused of cheating at cards while annoying a health-conscious Paul with his cigar smoke. However, the real problem is Paul's strait-laced behavior, and the guys claim they have no room for Paul in the car or cabin for their spring break ski trip. While out on a store run, Kevin and Paul argue and Paul actually says to Kevin what Kevin wanted to say to him—that he has "changed." But just when tensions reach a peak, the guys' problems vanish when Randy—always a loser—finally wins a hand. Then Alice calls to inform Chuck she's not pregnant; and Kevin and Paul understand, after 17 years of friendship, that they are growing apart. While cleaning up, Kevin discovers Jeff's winning streak was still intact after all—though he questions himself how he had five kings. Guest starring: Barney Martin as the elderly Kevin; Billy Beck as the elderly Paul; Walt Beaver as the elderly Jeff; Bob Larkin as the elderly Chuck; Burt Saunders as the elderly Randy. Absent Dan Lauria as Jack Arnold; Alley Mills as Norma Arnold; Jason Hervey as Wayne Arnold; Danica McKellar as Winnie Cooper.
112	19	"The Little Women"	Ken Topolsky	David M. Wolf	April 21, 1993	02S0059219	14.9
As the Women's Liberation Movement grows across the country in the spring of 1973, Norma doesn't want her college degree to go to waste. So she takes a full-time job as a comptroller at Micro Electronics, a new computer software company, earning $225 per week, much to the surprise of Jack and the boys. Meanwhile, Kevin is proud of his SAT's, scoring a 1240 (650 verbal and 590 math). However, he becomes increasingly insecure when he learns that Winnie scored a 1482 (725 verbal and 757 math). She can now consider going to any of the top Ivy League universities while Kevin's friends have to settle for Ed's Junior College. Their male egos wounded, Jack and Kevin both decide to take their respective women to King Pin Lanes for a friendly battle-of-the-sexes game of bowling. Even though the Jack and Kevin win, Norma and Winnie are good sports about it, helping Kevin realize that a more liberated world may not be so bad after all. Absent: Josh Saviano as Paul Pfeiffer.
113	20	"Reunion"	Arthur Albert	Story by : Mark B. Perry; Teleplay by : Robin Riordan	April 28, 1993	02S0059220	12.2
The Arnolds fly to Norma's hometown for her 25th high school class reunion. Norma's parents, Karl and Jane Gustavson (making their first and only appearance in the series) express their continued disapproval of Jack. They attempt to set Norma up with her old high school sweetheart, Roger, a medical doctor she almost married. While staying at the Gustavsons', Norma is wooed by Roger; Jack is hurt in the sack race at the reunion picnic; Kevin is menaced by their Rottweiler; and Wayne—anticipating a huge inheritance of his grandparents seemingly valuable antique possessions—takes inventory of the house, after Mr. Gustavson informs the boys they will get everything their grandparents own upon their deaths. Meanwhile, Kevin wonders why his father doesn't seem to mind that Norma puts up with her parents' meddling. Jack tells Kevin that his mother wanted more out of life than the small town she grew up in had to offer, so she quickly left everyone behind. This makes Kevin finally understand his mother's desire to break old routines. Guest starring: Edward Edwards as Dr. Roger Baldwin; Macon McCalman as Karl Gustavson; Jean Speegle Howard as Jane Gustavson. Absent: Danica McKellar as Winnie Cooper; Josh Saviano as Paul Pfeiffer.
114	21	"Summer"	Michael Dinner	Sy Rosen	May 5, 1993	02S0059221	21.0
Winnie takes a summer job as a lifeguard at a hotel resort, while Kevin considers a cross-country trip with his friends, an idea that Jack soon quashes knowing that Chuck and Jeff is cross-country without Chuck's own parents and Jeff's mother's permission. Frustrated, Kevin then quits his job at Jack's factory and drives to the resort to see Winnie. Kevin then takes a job as a waiter to be near Winnie, but is then disappointed when he and Winnie are so busy they have no time for each other. Kevin gambles his gas money playing poker with the resort's house band and manages to win big; but later, when he finds Winnie to tell her of his good fortune, he becomes shocked to see Winnie kissing a co-worker. Part one of the two-part series finale.
115	22	"Independence Day"	Michael Dinner	Bob Brush	May 12, 1993	02S0059222	21.0
Kevin, furious with Winnie over her infidelity, plays another poker game, this time losing all his money and his car. He then punches the guy Winnie kissed, quits his job and hitchhikes home because he is now without a car. Winnie is fired from her job because of Kevin's tirade; and she, too, hitches a ride back home, and Kevin happens to be picked up by the same couple. Winnie tells Kevin her side of what happened; but their argument becomes so heated that they are both dropped off at the side of the road. Soon after a thunderstorm occurs and they find refuge in an old barn where they decide they do not want to lose their childhood relationship. The next day they make it back home just in time for the Independence Day parade, and the present-day adult Kevin reveals the fates of himself, his family, and his friends from that day onward. Part two (conclusion) of the two-part series finale.
