= Yemi Osunkoya =

Nigerian fashion designer

- Born: 1966 (age 59–60); Ibadan
- Education: Paris Academy School of Fashion; Obafemi Awolowo University
- Occupation: fashion designer
- Known for: Kosibah brand label designing haute couture bridal gowns and elegant eveningwears
- Website: www.kosibah.com

Yemi Osunkoya (born 1966) is a New York-based Nigerian fashion designer and the founder and creative director of Kosibah Creations, a couture bridal and eveningwear brand. The company was named after his mother, Cosiba, which, in the Republic of Benin, represents the "day name" of a female child born on a Sunday.

== Biography ==
=== Early life and education ===
Osunkoya was born in Ibadan, Oyo State of Nigeria and attended International School Ibadan from 1977 to 1982 before studying at the Obafemi Awolowo University where he graduated with BA in Fine Arts and Textile Design in 1987. He then migrated to the United Kingdom and completed a fashion diploma at the Paris Academy School of Fashion, London.

=== Career ===
Osunkoya launched his fashion brand Kosibah Creations in London in 1991. His bridal brand features in bridal salons and fashion shows across the globe and has many celebrated clients such as politician Diane Abbott, singer and TV personality Alesha Dixon, Janet Boateng the wife of politician Paul Boateng, actress Louise Rose, singer Stephanie Benson, Miss World Agbani Darego, Hollywood actress Indra Ove, singer and actress Kelly Rowland, Sheila Ferguson of The Three Degrees, actress Helen Fraser of ITV's Bad Girls and Angela Griffin of BBC's Babyfather. In 2016, Osunkoya relocated to New York City where he now runs his US based Kosibah bridal salon. He recently signed a partnership deal with Mark Ingram Atelier of the Manhattan-based bridal salon known for upscale and sophisticated bridal designs where he also revealed his 2020 Kosibah bridal collections during the Wedding Weekend at Madison Avenue, New York.

== Philanthropy ==
At the start of the COVID-19 pandemic, Osunkoya partnered with Kelly Hall-Tompkins, founder of Music Kichen (a charity organisation that offers classical music to homeless shelters), to sew face-masks and donate them to homeless shelters. He is a member of the Bridal Council and the first person of colour to join this New York-based non-profit organisation that supports bridal-focused designers, retailers and media.

== Awards and recognition ==
In 2017, Osunkoya was listed among the Top 10 Bridal Designers in Nigeria by the City People Magazine. He also received the "Pride of Africa" Award in 2014 at Africa Fashion Week Barcelona. He received the 2012 International Designer of the Year by the City People Magazine; the Excellence Award at the Gathering of Africa's Best in 2006; the Diamond recognition in the 2005 National Weddings show; the Bridal Designer of the Year at the Mahogany Bridal Awards in 2002 and 2004; and also received the Highly Commended designation from the National Weddings show in 2002.
