= Allison Charney =

American soprano and producer (born 1967)

Allison Charney Epstein
- Born: Allison Charney; 1967 (age 58–59); New York, New York
- Occupations: Grammy-nominated opera singer and classical music producer
- Years active: 1994–present
- Spouse: Adam Epstein (m. 2004)
- Website: preformances.org

Allison Charney Epstein (born November 14, 1967) is a Grammy-nominated American soprano and producer known for her opera performances and recording career. Charney has been described as having "a notably beautiful voice. Expressive, lush and clear." She has performed dozens of leading roles with opera companies across the United States, been a soloist with major orchestras, and has recorded worldwide. In 2025, she was nominated for a Grammy Award for ALIKE: My Mother's Dream, and was a Choral Producer on Kitt Wakeley's Grammy-nominated album "Seven Seasons." From 2009-2021, she was also Artistic and Executive Director of the classical music series PREformances with Allison Charney in New York City.

== Early life and education ==
Charney was born in 1967 in New York City, the daughter of the actor Jordan Charney and the producer/director Nancy Cooperstein Charney. She has one younger brother, Daniel Charney. The family moved to the Los Angeles area, where Charney first began receiving acclaim for her singing in high school at the Westlake School for Girls (now Harvard-Westlake School).

She graduated magna cum laude with highest honors from Harvard College (Harvard University) in 1989. While there she studied under—and developed a lifelong friendship with—renowned Professor Luise Vosgerchian. For her senior honors thesis, she directed Harvard's annual Lowell House Opera.

Later, she earned two graduate degrees from the Peabody Institute of the Johns Hopkins University.

== Career ==
New York Newsday reports that "it took only a single phrase...to realize that Charney possesses a warm, crystalline...and agile soprano voice" who "captivated listeners with her sensuous, dramatic style." America Oggi notes she "knows how to fully read the book of the female heart...underlining with the incredible lyricism of her voice every change in emotion, every new feeling...and vocal beauty." And the San Jose Mercury News adds that she "possesses a richly satisfying soprano; her register is brilliant but not piercing at the top, resonant at the bottom, warmly secure through the midpoint."

Peter Randsman of Randsman Artists Management represents her.

=== 1990s and 2000s ===
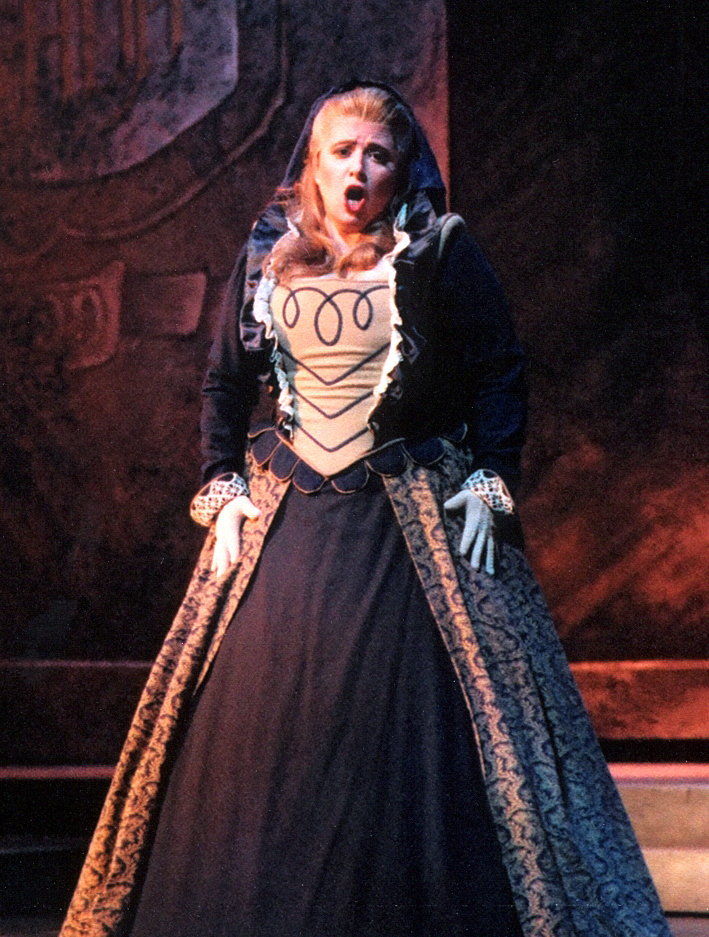
Charney as Donna Elvira

While earning her degrees at Peabody, she began her professional career, appearing in two musicals at Baltimore's Center Stage. She then was an apprentice artist with Central City Opera and spent two years in the Young Artist program at the Florida Grand Opera. In 1993, she was a national finalist in the Metropolitan Opera National Council Auditions competition. That launched her debut season with the New York City Opera, where she sang leading roles in La Boheme, Carmen, and Magic Flute.

At opera companies throughout the United States, she sang Puccini heroines, most notably the title roles in Madama Butterfly, Tosca, and Suor Angelica, both Mimi and Musetta in La Boheme, and Liù in Turandot. Her Mozart interpretations included both Donna Anna and Donna Elvira in Don Giovanni, both Susanna and the Countess in Le Nozze di Figaro, and Pamina in Die Zauberflöte. Her versatility led her to sing all four heroines in Les Contes d'Hoffman as well as Rosalinde in Die Fledermaus, Micaëla in Carmen, Nedda in Pagliacci, Santuzza in Cavalleria Rusticana, and the title roles in Martha, La Traviata, Jenufa, and The Merry Widow.

She has performed with, among others, New York City Opera, the Atlanta Opera, Florida Grand Opera, Utah Opera, Nashville Opera, and Opera Memphis.

Concert highlights during this period included performances at Alice Tully Hall and Avery Fisher Hall, and with the Philadelphia Orchestra at the Kimmel Center for Performing Arts.

=== 2010s ===
In 2009, Charney developed and inaugurated the series PREformances with Allison Charney. PREformances was incubated at the JCC in Manhattan, and after eight seasons the series moved to its permanent home at Merkin Concert Hall at Kaufman Music Center. Notable guest artists included New York Philharmonic Music Director Alan Gilbert, Metropolitan Opera stars William Burden and Maria Zifchak, "Queen of the Flute," Carol Wincenc, violinist Kelly Hall-Tompkins of Broadway's "Fiddler on the Roof" fame, NY Philharmonic principal cellist Carter Brey, and concert pianists Joel Fan, Navah Perlman, and Blair McMillen, among 100+ others. The series also featured new classical works by composers such as Michael Ching, Moshe Knoll, Mary Ellen Childs, Russell Platt, and Kim D. Sherman.

Charney co-created and co-hosted with pianist Donna Weng Friedman the WQXR mini-series HER/MUSIC;HER/STORY. The program shines a light on women composers, past and present.

She founded the ARK Trio along with cellist Kajsa William-Olsson and pianist Reiko Uchida.

Concert highlights during this period included performances at NJPAC, with the ARK Trio at NY's Symphony Space, and as a soloist under the baton of Maestro Alan Gilbert with the Boston Pops at Symphony Hall.

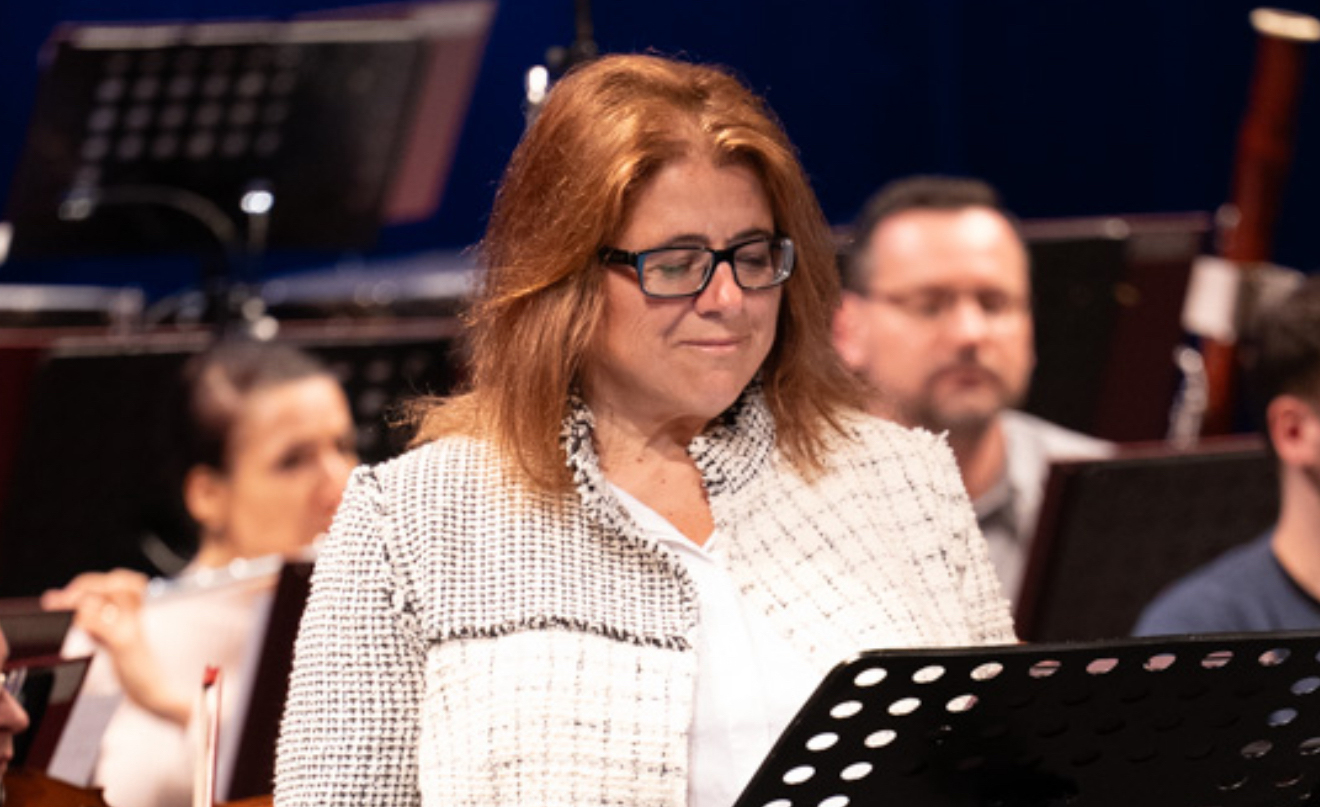
Charney in rehearsal; Ústí nad Labem, Czech Republic, 2025

=== 2020s ===
With the advent of the COVID-19 pandemic, Charney pivoted to the virtual stage with her 7-part concert and conversation series PREformances: Season of Hope, presented by New York City's historic Town Hall.

She made her Carnegie Hall debut in 2022 as a soloist in Kelly Hall-Tompkins' Forgotten Voices, a composite song cycle written by top emerging and established composers with text created by homeless-shelter participants set to music. She made two international appearances in 2024 and 2025 with the Lviv National Philharmonic and North Bohemian Opera Orchestra respectively. And in 2025, she made her debut with the Dallas Symphony Orchestra.

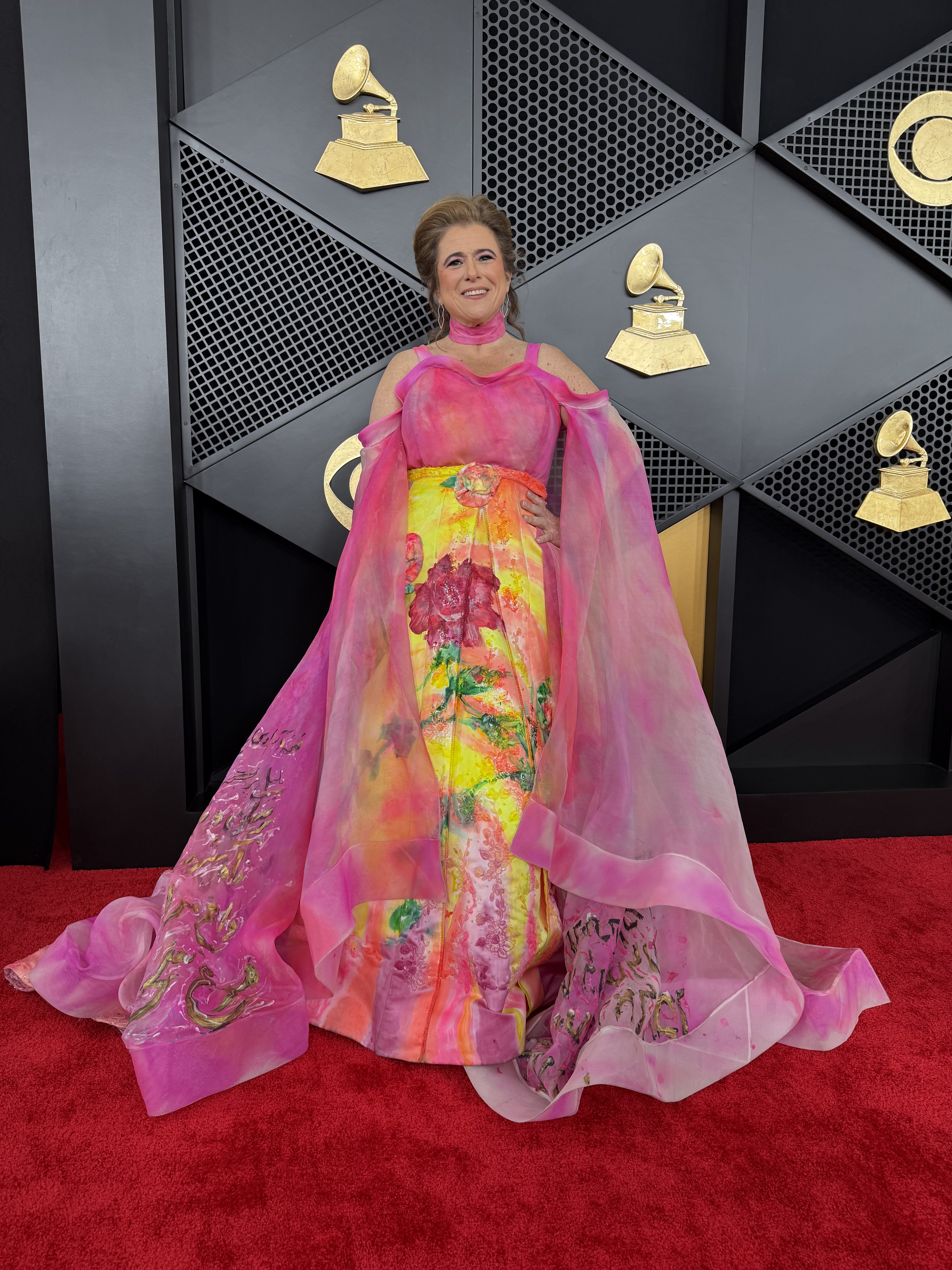
Charney at the 2026 GRAMMY Awards red carpet. Photo by Rick Krusky.

At the 2026 Grammy Awards, she was lauded by USA Today as one of the artists who "stun on Grammys red carpet."

== Recordings ==
Charney's most recent album is ALIKE: My Mother's Dream. It was released on August 8, 2025; Spotify then named it one of the "Best New Classical Music Releases." The album debuted at #2 on the iTunes Classical Charts (both in the US and Globally) and at #11 on Billboard. In November of 2025, the album was nominated for a Grammy Award for Best Classical Solo Vocal Album.

Featuring the National Symphonia Orchestra under the direction of Grammy-nominated conductor Benjamin Loeb, ALIKE: My Mother's Dream is Charney's tribute to her mother's lifelong mission to focus on what makes us alike as human beings rather than focusing on what separates us.

She is a Choral Producer on Kitt Wakeley's 2025 Grammy-nominated album "Seven Seasons," and was an Associate Producer on Aaron Lazar's 2024 Grammy-nominated "Impossible Dream" album.

In 2024, Charney released the single "Bridge to Peace: Invocation" with baritone Will Liverman, violinist Kelly Hall-Tompkins, cellist Peter Seidenberg, and the PREformances-Lviv Chamber Ensemble. Charney and her team traveled to Lviv during the Ukraine-Russia war to record and perform it. The song was written by American composer Kim D. Sherman, and features the line "Make peace on all your lands" sung in 15 world languages. Due to a wartime bombing, power was cut to the city just before the curtain rose. So the show went on using limited lighting from backup generators.

In 2023, Charney and the ARK Trio released ARK RESOUNDING on the Parma Records label. The album reached #1 on Amazon's list of Hot New Releases in Classical.

Also in 2023, Charney was a featured soloist on the AVIE Records recording of Hall-Tompkins' Forgotten Voices.

Charney performed on Choose Life, Uvacharta Bachayim, the dramatic oratorio commemorating the Holocaust. The piece was nominated for a Pulitzer Prize, and was released in 2011, with a re-release on Navona Records in 2025.

== Personal life ==
She is married to Adam Epstein; they have two sons and live in New York City. A brief discussion of their first lunch together was featured in Daniel Goleman's book Social Intelligence: The New Science of Human Relationships. She retains Allison Charney as her performing name and Allison Epstein as her personal/married name.

== Selected operatic repertoire ==
Year	Role	Composer	Opera	Company
1994	Musetta	Puccini	La Boheme	New York City Opera
1994	Mimi	Puccini	La Boheme	New Rochelle Opera
1995	Alice Ford	Verdi	Falstaff	Washington Summer Opera
1995	Musetta	Puccini	La Boheme	New York City Opera
1996	Susanna	Mozart	Le Nozze Di Figaro	Opera Memphis
1996	Soprano Soloist	Hindemith	Mörder, Hoffnung der Frauen	American Symphony Orchestra at Avery Fisher Hall
1996	Norina	Donizetti	Don Pasquale	Washington Summer Opera
1996	Nedda	Leoncavallo	Pagliacci	Metro Lyric Opera
1996	Musetta	Puccini	La Boheme	Nashville Opera
1997	Cio-Cio San	Puccini	Madama Butterfly	Annapolis Opera
1997	Micaëla	Bizet	Carmen	Opera Tampa
1997	Martha	Flotow	Martha	Syracuse Opera
1997	Nedda	Leoncavallo	Pagliacci	Chorus pro Musica
1997	Musetta	Puccini	La Boheme	St. Bart's Music Festival
1997	Cio-Cio San	Puccini	Madama Butterfly	Missouri Opera
1997	Cio-Cio San	Puccini	Madama Butterfly	Opera Northeast
1997	Donna Elvira	Mozart	Don Giovanni	Opera Memphis
1997	Susanna	Mozart	Le Nozze Di Figaro	Bohème Opera
1998	Liu	Puccini	Turandot	Florida Grand Opera
1998	Hanna	Lehar	The Merry Widow	Opera Illinois
1998	Tosca	Puccini	Tosca	New West Symphony
1999	Gilda	Verdi	Rigoletto	Bohème Opera
1999	The four heroines	Offenbach	The Tales of Hoffmann	Utah Festival Opera
1999	Musetta	Puccini	La Boheme	Atlanta Opera
1999	Micaëla	Bizet	Carmen	Florida Grand Opera
1999	Suor Angelica	Puccini	Suor Angelica	Dicapo Opera
2000	Tosca	Puccini	Tosca	Opera Memphis
2000	Rosalind	Strauss	Die Fledermaus	Syracuse Opera: (Artist of the Year)
2000	Pamina	Mozart	Die Zauberflöte	Colorado Opera Festival
2000	Tosca	Puccini	Tosca	Dicapo Opera
2000	Sandrina	Mozart	La Finta Giardiniera	Wildwood Festival
2000	Susanna	Mozart	Le Nozze di Figaro	Opera Tampa
2001	Violetta	Verdi	La Traviata	Mississippi Opera
2001	Jenufa	Janáček	Jenufa	Washington Summer Opera
2002	Susanna	Mozart	Le Nozze di Figaro	Atlanta Opera
2002	Nedda	Leoncavallo	Pagliacci	Opera Tampa
2002	Santuzza	Leoncavallo	Cavalleria Rusticana	Opera Tampa
2003	Donna Elvira	Mozart	Don Giovanni	Opera Illinois
2003	Cio-Cio San	Puccini	Madama Butterfly	Utah Festival Opera
2004	Cio-Cio San	Puccini	Madama Butterfly	Atlanta Opera
