= Luise Vosgerchian =

American pianist

- Born: November 9, 1922; Watertown, Massachusetts, U.S.
- Died: March 13, 2000 (aged 77)
- Spouse: Kamil Pagacik
- Children: 2

Academic background
- Education: New England Conservatory of Music

Academic work
- Discipline: Music
- Sub-discipline: Concert piano
- Institutions: Brandeis University; Harvard University

Luise Vosgerchian (November 9, 1922 – March 13, 2000) was an American concert pianist and music professor at Harvard University.

== Biography ==
Vosgerchian was born in Watertown, Massachusetts in 1922, the daughter of Armenian immigrants. Her mother, Araxy Kurkjian, had immediate family who perished in the Armenian genocide. Her mother died in 1998 at the age of 102, though there is little known on how close they remained. Vosgerchian signed up for piano lessons almost immediately after hearing her first piano recital. Several years later, when she prepared to play her debut recital, she noticed a misprint in the program about her name. She didn’t seem to mind, so from then on, the spelling of her first name changed from “Louise” to “Luise”.

She met Kamil Pagacik in Paris in 1949 and later married him. She returned to Boston in 1956. After Vosgerchian's death in 2000, a memorial service was held for her at Sanders Theatre.

== Education and Career ==
Luise Vosgerchian studied at the New England Conservatory of Music until 1945. Vosgerchian began her career as a music instructor at Brandeis University. She began teaching at Harvard University in 1959 and was a mentor of many prominent musicians. Among her most notable students were Allison Charney, John Adams, Yo-Yo Ma, Bobby McFerrin, Bob Telson, Stephen Pruslin and Richard St. Clair. She was made a full professor in 1971, and was named department chairman in 1974. She later retired in 1990, and her students organized a tribute concert at Sanders Theater.

Physicist Brian Greene described Vosgerchian in Until the End of Time as one of his most influential teachers, noting she "had a deep interest in how scientific discoveries relate to aesthetic sensibilities".

In 1948, The New York Times wrote about one of her recitals. Harvard awards Luise Vosgerchian Teaching Award to students who are dedicated to music and arts education.

Vosgerchian can be seen and heard playing in a performance of Webern's Quartet for Violin, Clarinet, Saxophone and Piano on Episode 5 of Aaron Copland's WNET series Music in the Twenties.
