= Sunset Limousine =

- Sunset Limousine VHS cover
- Genre: Comedy
- Written by: Dick Clement; Ian La Frenais; Wayne Kline
- Directed by: Terry Hughes
- Starring: John Ritter; Susan Dey; Paul Reiser; Audrie Neenan; Martin Short; George Kirby; James Luisi; Louise Sorel; Lainie Kazan; Michael Ensign
- Music by: Mike Post; Frank Denson
- Country of origin: United States
- Original language: English

Production
- Executive producer: Dennis E. Doty
- Producers: Allan McKeown; Robert Vehon
- Production location: San Diego
- Cinematography: Dennis Dalzell
- Editor: Michael J. Lynch
- Running time: 92 minutes
- Production companies: ITC Entertainment; WitzEnd Productions

Original release
- Network: CBS
- Release: October 12, 1983

Sunset Limousine is a 1983 American made-for-television comedy film written by Dick Clement and Ian La Frenais. Directed by Terry Hughes and shot on locations in San Diego and Los Angeles, the film stars John Ritter, Susan Dey, Paul Reiser, Audrie Neenan, Martin Short, and George Kirby in a story about a limo driver who aspires to be a stand-up comic.

Pre-production began in 1979 after British company WitzEnd Productions signed to produce the project for CBS. Filming took place during May 1983 with Lainie Kazan, Martin Short, and Audie Neenan joining the cast that month. The film debuted October 12, 1983 on CBS.

== Plot ==
Alan O'Black is an aspiring stand-up comic who takes on a job as limousine driver in order to prove to his girlfriend Julie after she has kicked him out of their shared home, that he can be a responsible adult. Her standing complaint about Alan as a boyfriend has been that he sees life as one long rehearsal. This is exacerbated by the fact that, even with a now-steady job and dealing with strange passenger/clients, Alan rehearses his comedy at every opportunity and deals with bizarre situations with good-natured aplomb. He and his buddy Jay become involved the shady dealings of businessman Bradley Coleman, which results in a chase through Los Angeles with both sides of the law in pursuit.

Eventually, things come to a head when he loses Bradley at a galleria, forcing him to go back and look for him just as he's about to perform a stand-up routine at the Laff Track. Unfortunately, he and Julie, who had followed him, end up being pursued by the mobsters. Looking for an opportunity to lose them, they try to blend in at a funeral at Inglewood Park Cemetery, only to find themselves among the mourners for real following an accident which ends up costing Alan both his limo and his job. They return to the Laff Track just in time for him to perform his routine, and Bradley reveals that he had gotten his goods legitimately through an inheritance and wanted to donate them before the IRS caught wind. During the routine, Alan stumbles when he sees the mobsters who had been pursuing him and stolen his limo at the cemetery have followed him to the Laff Track, triggering a brawl that he, Julie, Jay, and Bradley barely escape with their lives, but not before Alan schedules an appointment with network executives who had seen his act. When the police arrive, Alan indicates the men they came for, one of whom pathetically tries to pin it all on his partner. Later, Alan reveals to Julie everything involving Bradley's dealings, including his dropping the goods off at the post office between the funeral and his stand-up routine for safekeeping until he could get them back to Bradley. The film ends as Alan and Julie kiss.

== Principal cast ==
- John Ritter as Alan O'Black
- Susan Dey as Julie Preston
- Paul Reiser as Jay Neilson
- Audrie Neenan as Karen
- Martin Short as Bradley Z. Coleman
- George Kirby as Elmer
- James Luisi as Angel
- Louise Sorel as Dolores Chase
- Lainie Kazan as Jessie Durning
- Michael Ensign as Gavrik
- Charles Lane as Reinhammer
- Stacey Nelkin as Stacey
- John Snee as Steven
- Darrell Zwerling as Janczyn
- Tom Dreesen as Comic 'Himself'
- Eleanor Mondale as Secretary
- Martin Mull as Mel Shaver
- Joyce Little as Lauren
- Dick Patterson as Howard Chase
- Hal Landon Jr. as Gardener

== Reception ==
People magazine bemoaned John Ritter's comedy ability being "drowned out" within the "cruder context of Three's Company", and wrote that his ability "shines in this fanciful TV-movie." It was expanded that the film's story line is silly, but as Ritter's character "gamely rehearses his [comedy] act through it all", he shows himself as "delightful."

The Age wrote that Sunset Limousine stood out from most American television comedies because it actually was funny. In praising star John Ritter, it was offered that his timing and charm made a story that was otherwise rubbish into something entertaining. As the story progresses Ritter's character "handles the most impossible situations with politeness and good humor," becoming "increasingly endearing."

Ocala Star-Banner praised the film, writing the film's "magic ingredient is John Ritter," and that "Ritter's style is what makes Sunset Limousine a welcome bit of light entertainment."

Pittsburgh Post-Gazette panned the film, offering that CBS' reliance on names over substance could not keep the film from being silly, and that even appearances by Lannie Kazan and George Kirby could not save the film from being mindless.
