= Darrell Zwerling =

American actor

- Born: September 9, 1928; Pittsburgh, Pennsylvania, U.S.
- Died: April 11, 2014 (aged 85); Hollywood, California, U.S.
- Occupation: Actor
- Years active: 1968–1991

Darrell Zwerling (September 9, 1928 – April 11, 2014) was an American character actor in film and television. His most famous role was Hollis Mulwray, the unfortunate Water Authority Commissioner (the husband of Faye Dunaway's character) in Roman Polanski's Chinatown. In 1973, he portrayed Mr. Charney, a voice-over applicant with laryngitis at WJM-TV, in the season four episode, "The Lou and Edie Story" on The Mary Tyler Moore Show.

He was born in Pittsburgh, Pennsylvania to Irwin and Esther Zwerling, Jewish emigrants from Austria and Romania, respectively, and had one elder sibling, a sister, Bernice.

== Death ==
Zwerling died in Hollywood, California on April 11, 2014, aged 85, from undisclosed causes. His death was not disclosed until September 16, 2014, by The Juilliard School in New York.

== Filmography ==
Darrell appeared in many movies and on television.

Film
Year	Title	Role	Notes
1968	The Secret Life of an American Wife	Fan	Uncredited
1972	Lady Liberty	Stan	Uncredited
1974	Our Time	Dr. Madden	
1974	Chinatown	Hollis Mulwray	
1975	Doc Savage: The Man of Bronze	Brigadier General Theodore Marley "Ham" Brooks	
1975	The Ultimate Warrior	Silas	
1976	Family Plot	Priest	Uncredited
1977	Capricorn One	Dr. Bergen	
1977	High Anxiety	Dr. Eckhardt	
1978	Grease	Mr. Lynch	
1979	The Main Event	Sheldon	
1979	…And Justice for All	William Zinoff	
1986	Texas Godfather	Professor	
1990	Rush Week	Professor Caldwell	
1990	Joe Versus the Volcano	Underwear Salesman	
1990	Wild at Heart	Singer's Manager	
Television
Year	Title	Role	Notes
1973	Miracle on 34th Street	Floorwalker	Uncredited
1973	Mary Tyler Moore	Mr. Charney	1 episode
1973–1975	Kojak	Dr. Agajanian / Medical Examiner	5 episodes
1974	Mannix	Richard	1 episode
1974	Columbo	Lewis Lacey / Motel Manager	2 episodes
1974–1977	Police Woman	Harry Kubelski / Wilkes	2 episodes
1975	Sanford and Son	Pediatrician	1 episode
1975	Karen	Brian	1 episode
1975	Judgement: The Court Martial of Lieutenant William Calley	Maj. David	TV movie
1975	Joe and Sons	Doctor	1 episode
1976	Alice	Calvin	1 episode
1976	The Boy in the Plastic Bubble	Mr. Brister	TV movie
1976	The Blue Knight	Eddie Harris	1 episode
1976	McCoy	Phelps	1 episode
1977	Quincy M.E.	Frazier	1 episode
1977	The Red Hand Gang	Jaworski	2 episodes
1977	The Greatest Thing That Almost Happened	Dr. Brimson	TV movie
1977	Little House on the Prairie	Horace Benson	2 episodes
1977–1979	Starsky and Hutch	several roles	5 episodes
1978	With This Ring	Mr. Pheeb	TV movie
1979	Blind Ambition	Frederick LaRue	TV mini-series
1979	Buck Rogers in the 25th Century	Macon	1 episode
1979	A Man Called Sloane	Dr. Eckhart	1 episode
1980	Barney Miller	Dorsey	1 episode
1980	Tenspeed and Brown Shoe	Lovell	1 episode
1982	Father Murphy	Prosecuting Attorney	1 episode
1982	Best of the West	Fredericks	1 episode
1982	Trapper John, M.D.	Rozar	1 episode
1983	Sunset Limousine	Janczyn	TV movie
1984	Simon & Simon	Akins / H.M. Hadley	2 episodes
1985	Cagney & Lacey	Manager	1 episode
1986	Matlock	Dr. Farnsworth - Weatherman	1 episode
1986	Hill Street Blues	Teasdale	1 episode
1986	The Young and the Restless	Judge Patrick Sullivan	1 episode
1987	L.A. Law	Jury Foreman	1 episode
1987	Dynasty	Minister	1 episode
1988	Glitz	Bertoia	1 episode
1991	Murder, She Wrote	Doctor	1 episode, (final appearance)
