= Camp Cucamonga =

1990 television film

- VHS cover. (Clockwise from left) Josh Saviano, Chad Allen, Danica McKellar, Candace Cameron
- Genre: Action; Adventure; Comedy
- Teleplay by: Bennett Tramer
- Story by: Bennett Tramer; Rich Melcombe
- Directed by: Roger Duchowny
- Starring: John Ratzenberger; Brian Robbins; Jennifer Aniston; Chad Allen; Candace Cameron; Danica McKellar; Josh Saviano; Tasha Scott; Jaleel White; Breckin Meyer; Dorothy Lyman; Richard Herd; Sherman Hemsley; G. Gordon Liddy
- Theme music composer: Michael Cruz
- Country of origin: United States
- Original language: English

Production
- Executive producer: Rich Melcombe
- Production locations: Paramount Ranch - 2813 Cornell Road, Agoura, California
- Cinematography: Peter Smokler
- Editor: Larry Harris
- Running time: 93 min
- Production companies: NBC Productions; Richmel Productions

Original release
- Network: NBC
- Release: September 23, 1990

Camp Cucamonga (also titled: How I Spent My Summer and Lights Out) is a made-for-television movie that first aired on NBC on September 23, 1990.

The family film served primarily as a vehicle to cast a variety of stars from popular TV series of the era, including John Ratzenberger (Cheers), Brian Robbins (Head of the Class), Chad Allen (My Two Dads), Candace Cameron (Full House), Josh Saviano and Danica McKellar (both of The Wonder Years), Jaleel White (Family Matters), Dorothy Lyman (Mama's Family) and Sherman Hemsley (Amen). The film is also notable for including an early starring role for Jennifer Aniston before she became well known, as well as a supporting role for Breckin Meyer and the comedy acting debut of G. Gordon Liddy (Miami Vice).

== Plot ==
Several teens meet on a bus. Jennifer is seeing what is happening in her life when she meets Dennis, and the two fall head over heels in love. Meanwhile, Frankie and Amber talk about how they are older as boyfriend and girlfriend and now can hang out more often. Lindsey interrupts the couple, telling them to be quiet since the whole bus is not interested. Amber ultimately fires back, telling Lindsey to mind her own business. Cody spills soda on nerdy Max Plotkin, but Lindsey sticks up for Max by tripping Cody on his skateboard. Because of this, Max falls head over heels in love with her. Then a biker, Roger flirts with fellow counselor Ava. The two end up having an "apples and oranges" relationship.

The kids arrive at Camp Cucamonga and meet head counselor Marvin. He announces that they are going to have a "Battle of the Bunks". When the girls are going to take showers, Amber makes fun of Lindsey by telling if she takes a shower, it will spoil her image. Because of this, Lindsey leaves and goes to her bunk. Then all the kids get ready for the cookout and are suddenly missing and are found by the camp crew. The camp starts to get bad critics. The gang decides to make a rap video to promote the camp, which becomes a hit, and the camp is visited by a special guest. When the Battle of the Bunks begins, Lindsey manages to win all the female activities, while Frankie is overwhelmed and begins to hang out with Lindsey more often, causing Amber to grow jealous as a result.

The girls then get letters from their parents. Amber takes away Lindsey's letters and reveals that they are fake. Amber reads the letter and reveals that Lindsey's parents are filing for divorce; sad and ashamed, she then runs away, but the rest of the gang finds her. Now the time comes for the baseball tournament, where Lindsey hopes Max will hit a home run. Frankie sees her shaking and holds her hand, causing Amber to get even more jealous. Max ends up hitting a home run and wins.

At the subsequent Victory Dance, Amber sees Frankie and Lindsey together and pulls Frankie aside. Max tells Lindsey that they should see other people and can go steady when they are ready. Amber and Frankie then break up because Frankie cares more about Lindsey than he cares about her. Frankie asks Lindsey to dance with him, and the two are officially a couple. Amber offers Max fruit punch, and they also become a couple. Max ends up winning the scholar-athlete award, while Roger and Ava are now official.

== Cast ==
- John Ratzenberger as Marvin Schector
- Brian Robbins as Roger Burke
- Jennifer Aniston as Ava Schector
- Chad Allen as Frankie Calloway
- Candace Cameron as Amber Lewis
- Danica McKellar as Lindsey Scott
- Josh Saviano as Max Plotkin
- Tasha Scott as Jennifer
- Jaleel White as Dennis Brooks
- Dorothy Lyman as Millie Schector
- Richard Herd as Thornton Bradley
- G. Gordon Liddy as Howard Sloan
- Sherman Hemsley as Herbert Himmel
- Lauren Tewes as Mrs Scott
- Breckin Meyer as Cody
- John Snee as Troy
- Patrick Thomas O'Brien as Virgil
- Kari Whitman as Patty
- Melanie Shatner as Wendy
- Johnny Galecki as Tony Johnson
- Dion Zamora as Chuck
- Rachel Verduzco as Tita
- Kate Finlayson as Wrangler
- Misty McCoy as Courtney Parker
- Risa Schiffman as Louise Bradley

== Home media ==
Camp Cucamonga was released on VHS in 1992 and on DVD in 2004.
