= Nancy Cooperstein =

Nancy Cooperstein Charney is an American theatrical producer and television director.

== Directing and producing ==
She produced the original Broadway production of Lanford Wilson's Pulitzer-prize winning play - Talley's Folly - and the Emmy-nominated and Wilbur Award-winner - Snow in August - based on the book by Pete Hamil. She produced Viet Rock, written by Megan Terry in 1966, which was the first of the anti-Viet Nam plays produced in New York City. As a director of television, Cooperstein's work includes the LA Emmy award-winning film, Pioneer Women and the ABC Afternoon Special - UNDER THE LIMIT.

In 1992 she directed an episode of The Wonder Years titled "Carnal Knowledge". It was the 19th episode of the fifth series. Cooperstein Charney's film work includes the short film – Private Debts - that was featured at Sundance, London, Deauville and Toronto Film Festivals. It won the Chicago Film Festival's Golden Hugo Award, and was shown on SHOWTIME.

Cooperstein Charney is the producer and director of the feature-length documentary film WHO’S NEXT?

== Life ==
Cooperstein Charney was born on July 8, 1939, to Grace and Harry Cooperstein. She was born and raised in Fall River, Massachusetts, where she began her professional acting career at age 11, appearing opposite Edward Arnold in The Apple of His Eye. She then went on to produce, direct and narrate the weekly radio program, Juniors Speak. Later in New York City, she continued her radio career on WEVD, where she wrote, directed and produced a weekly program called Women in the News.

Her acting credits include Elaine May's Name of a Soup and A New Leaf, Jean Claude Van Itallie's King of the United States and Mystery Play and Connie Kaiserman's My Little Girl. She was an acting member of Andre Gregory's Manhattan Project, and an acting/teaching member of The Working Theatre, a project of Joe Chaiken and Kristin Linklater. As such she was awarded the title of “Master Teacher” from the Rockefeller Foundation. Cooperstein Charney has taught acting to prisoners on Riker's Island and taught teachers how to use acting as an instructional tool through the Teachers and Writers Collaborative. A graduate of Bennington College, Cooperstein Charney continued her studies at The Neighborhood Playhouse, The Berghoff School and Columbia University.

== Private life ==
Cooperstein Charney is married to actor Jordan Charney. They have two children, including opera singer Allison Charney, and five grandchildren.
