= John Snee =

American actor

John Snee (born August 25, 1974) is an American former film and television actor.

== Career ==
Snee appeared in the role of Oliver "Ollie" Cleaver in the television show The New Leave It to Beaver from 1983 to 1989. He also acted in a number of films including Forever and Beyond (1981), Sunset Limousine (1983), Camp Cucamonga (1990), and Captain Nuke and the Bomber Boys (1995).

== Filmography ==
=== Film ===
Year	Title	Role	Notes
1983	Forever and Beyond	Julian	
1996	Captain Nuke and the Bomber Boys	Benny	

=== Television ===
Year	Title	Role	Notes
1982	I Was a Mail Order Bride	Boy	Television film
1983	Still the Beaver	Oliver Cleaver	Television film
1983	Sunset Limousine	Steven	Television film
1983–1989	The New Leave It to Beaver	Oliver 'Ollie' Cleaver	101 episodes
1990	Camp Cucamonga	Troy	Television film
1992	The Wonder Years	Kid	Episode: "Homecoming"
1996	Champs	Y	Episode: "Two of a Kind"
