= Kelly Hall-Tompkins =

American violinist

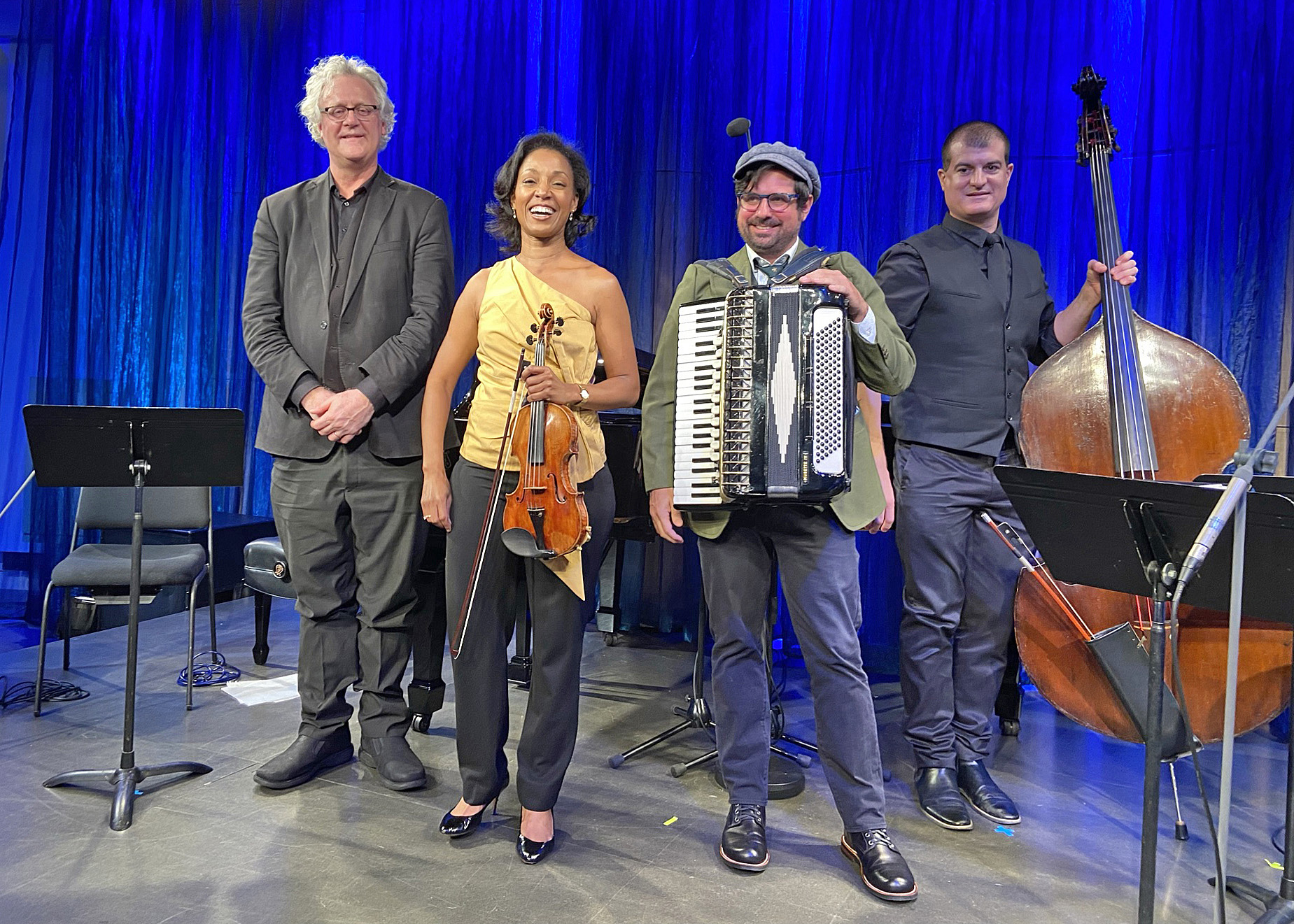
- Hall-Tompkins, Stephen Benson, Joshua Camp, and Michael Blanco on stage together
- Born: Greenville, South Carolina
- Education: Eastman School of Music Manhattan School of Music
- Occupation: Professional violinist
- Years active: 2008-present
- Organization: Music Kitchen - Food for the Soul
- Notable work: Played role of The Fiddler in the revival production of Fiddler on the Roof
- Awards: Naumburg International Violin Competition Honorarium Prize; Concert Artists Guild Career Grant
- Website: www.kellyhall-tompkins.com

Kelly Hall-Tompkins is a professional violinist and the founder of Music Kitchen-Food for the Soul, a program that lifts the spirits of homeless New Yorkers through live classical music recitals. She has performed as "The Fiddler", as a violin soloist, in the Grammy and Tony-nominated Broadway revival production of Fiddler on the Roof. Hall-Tompkins has appeared as a soloist with orchestras including the Dallas Symphony, Oakland Symphony, Jacksonville Symphony, Tulsa Philharmonic, Chamber Orchestra of New York, and a Brevard Festival Orchestra under the baton of Keith Lockhart, in addition to numerous concerts and recitals in cities around the world." In late 2020, Tompkins was featured in the PBS Great Performances Documentary on Fiddler: A Miracle of Miracles.

== Education ==
Hall-Tompkins attended Wade Hampton High School (Greenville, South Carolina) and the Fine Arts Center of Greenville, South Carolina, where she studied under the instruction of Lenny Schranze and Jon Grier. She continued her studies at the Eastman School of Music in Rochester, New York. She later completed her graduate degree at the Manhattan School of Music in New York, New York. In May 2016, Tompkins received her Honorary Doctorate of Musical Arts from the Manhattan School of Music.

== Career ==
=== Performances and music career ===
Hall-Tompkins has performed at many venues with many different symphonies in her career as a violinist. She has appeared as a co-soloist in Carnegie Hall with Glenn Dicterow and conductor Leonard Slatkin, and in London at Queen Elizabeth Hall, at Lincoln Center. She has performed with Dallas, Jacksonville, and Oakland Symphonies. She has given recitals in Paris, New York, Toronto, Washington, Chicago, and Santa Fe as well as the Tanglewood Festival and the Ravinia festival. Outside the United States, she has also performed in France, Germany, and Italy." In 2015 and 2016, she performed as The Fiddler in the 50th anniversary Broadway revival of Fiddler on the Roof. This led to the release of her CD "The Fiddler Expanding Tradition" in 2018, her second CD. The first, titled "In My Own Voice - Music for Violin and Piano with Harp" was released in 2008. After playing the role of "the fiddler" in the revival of Fiddler on the Roof, Tompkins was inspired to write and release the first ever Fiddler solo album, which would be titled The Fiddler: Expanding Tradition. In 2020, Tompkins was selected for the first cohort of WQXR's Artist propulsion lab, a grant program that supports early and mid-career musicians in New York City. Kelly-Hall is currently a member of the Gateways Music Festival. She currently serves as concertmaster in this organization and takes part in the Artistic Programs Committee.

=== Projects ===
==== Music Kitchen-Food for the Soul ====
Hall-Tompkins founded Music Kitchen — Food for the Soul in 2005. The program began in the basement of the men's shelter program located at Holy Trinity Lutheran Church, where Kelly-Hall was a member. During her time attending the church she decided one night, rather than practicing with collogues, to play for the shelter members and was then asked to return again. Music Kitchen is a program that lifts the spirits of homeless New Yorkers through live classical music recitals." By 2020, Music Kitchen has performed in over 30,000 shelter clients and had brought top artists to perform in over 100 concerts in various homeless shelters throughout the United States and Paris, France.

==== Forgotten voices ====
Forgotten Voices is a collection of sixteen songs that explores the human experience. This project was initiated in 2019 in celebration of the fifteen years of success of Music Kitchen – Food for the Soul. The song cycle premiered on March 31, 2022, in Zankel Hall, located at Carnegie Hall, with text collected from the general feedback of guest of the Music Kitchen performances. The collected feedback was made into music by commissioned accomplished composers Courtney Bryan, Jon Jeffrey Grier, Kelly Hall-Tompkins, Beata Moon, James Lee III, Paul Moravec, Kevin Puts, Jeff Scott, Steve Sandberg, Kamala Sankaram, Carlos Simon, Angélica Negrón, Errollyn Wallen, Ellen Taaffee Zwilich, and Gabriel Kahane. Other collaborators include vocal artists Allison Charney, Adrienne Danrich, Jesse Blumberg, and Mark Risinger in addition to instrumentalists Andrew Gonzalez, Alexis Pia Gerlach, Peter Seidenberg, and John-Paul Norpoth.

== Awards and features ==
Hall-Tompkins has won a Naumburg International Violin Competition Honorarium Prize as well as a Concert Artists Guild Career Grant. She has also been featured in the Smithsonian Museum for African-American History. The 50th anniversary Broadway Revival of Fiddler on the Roof, of which Hall-Tompkins was an integral part, received both Grammy and Tony nominations in 2016. Music Kitchen’s short film “Face to Face: Forgotten Voices Heard” has been awarded at festivals such as Berlin Short Film, Berlin Indie, Cannes World, La Documentary, Stockholm Short, and Red Movie Awards.
