= Alley Mills =

American actress

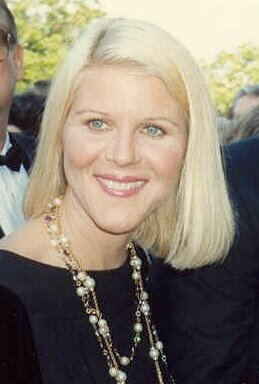
- Mills at the 1989 Emmy Awards
- Born: May 9, 1951 (age 75); Chicago, Illinois, U.S.
- Other name: Alley Bean
- Education: Yale University (BA); London Academy of Music and Dramatic Art (MA)
- Occupation: Actress
- Years active: 1965–present
- Spouse: Orson Bean (m. 1993; died 2020)

Allison Mills (born May 9, 1951), also known as Alley Bean, is an American actress known for her roles on television. She starred as Norma Arnold in the coming-of-age ABC comedy series The Wonder Years (1988–1993). In 2006, she began playing the role of Pamela Douglas, the sister of the late Forrester matriarch Stephanie Forrester (Susan Flannery), on the CBS soap opera The Bold and the Beautiful. From 2022 to 2024, Mills also portrayed the antagonistic Heather Webber on the ABC soap opera General Hospital, for which she won the Daytime Emmy Award for Outstanding Guest Performer in a Drama Series twice.

== Early life and education ==
Mills was born in Chicago, Illinois. Her father was television executive Ted Mills, and her mother, Joan (née Paterson) Mills Kerr, was an author and editor for American Heritage magazine. Her stepmother was actress Genevieve (Ginette Marguerite Auger), and her stepfather was Chester B. Kerr, a director of Yale University Press. She has one sister, Hilary Mills Loomis, and one brother, Tony Mills. Mills made her television debut as a child performer appearing in The Patti Page Show and later performed in Williamstown Theatre Festival.

Mills received a B.A. magna cum laude in drama and art history from Yale University in 1973 (becoming one of the first female undergraduates) and an M.A. from London Academy of Music and Dramatic Art.

== Career ==
Mills began her career appearing in episodes of television series Mr. Novak and The Leslie Uggams Show, before making her big screen debut playing minor role in the 1970 comedy-drama film, Diary of a Mad Housewife. During the 1970s, Mills performed in a number of stage productions, such as Off-Broadway's A Colliers Friday Night, The Little Foxes, Voices, The Idol Makers and Says I, Says He. In 1979 she was cast opposite Martin Short in the short-lived sitcom The Associates, where she played an attorney. In 1983 she starred opposite John Candy in the comedy film Going Berserk and the following year appeared in the comedy film Young Lust. During the 1980s also made guest appearances in television series Lou Grant, Newhart, Moonlighting and Punky Brewster. In 1982 she had four-episode arc in the NBC police drama, Hill Street Blues as Tracy Renko.

In 1988, Mills was cast as Norma Arnold, the mother of Fred Savage's character in the ABC comedy series, The Wonder Years, from 1988 to 1993. The show received positive reviews and won a Primetime Emmy Award for Outstanding Comedy Series. In 1989, Mills also began co-hosting the ABC daytime talk-show, Home. The Wonder Years ended in 1993 after six seasons and 114 episodes. During the 1990s, Mills acted in a number of made-for-television movies, such as Jonathan: The Boy Nobody Wanted (1992), Tainted Blood (1993) opposite Raquel Welch, Moment of Truth: Caught in the Crossfire (1994), Family Reunion: A Relative Nightmare (1995), and Deadline for Murder: From the Files of Edna Buchanan (1995) starring Elizabeth Montgomery in her last screen appearance. From 1993 to 1997, Mills had a recurring role in the CBS Western series, Dr. Quinn, Medicine Woman as Marjorie Quinn, Dr. Michaela Quinn's sister. She had previously appeared in the series as a saloon girl. In 2000, Mills co-starred in the ABC miniseries, The Beach Boys: An American Family. She also appeared in Roseanne, Touched by an Angel, NYPD Blue, Popular, Girlfriends, Sabrina the Teenage Witch, Strong Medicine and Yes, Dear.

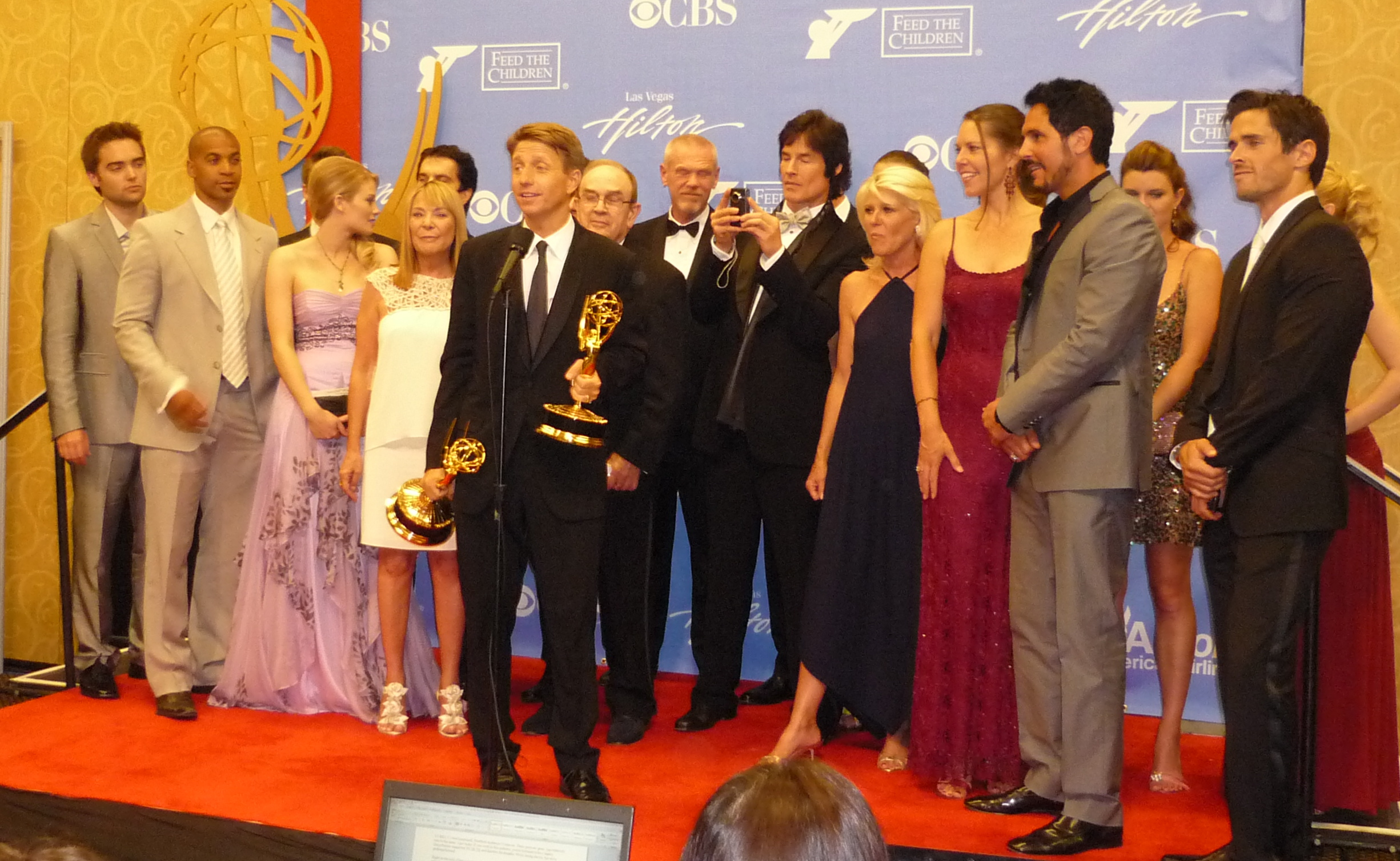
Mills with the cast and crew of The Bold and the Beautiful at 2010 Daytime Emmy Awards

In December 2006, Mills joined the cast of CBS daytime soap opera, The Bold and the Beautiful under contract as Pamela Douglas, the estranged sister of Stephanie Douglas Forrester. But in March 2007, after making only a handful of appearances, her character went insane, was confined to a mental hospital, and then disappeared from the show. Mills reprised the role on recurring status in 2007 and 2008, and by December 2008, was added to the opening credits as a contract player. In November 2019, it was reported that Mills was off contract with the show. Mills made a return appearance to The Bold and the Beautiful in August 2021. During her time on soap, Mills also acted in a number of Hallmark Channel movies, such as Reluctant Nanny and Appetite for Love.

In October, 2022, Mills replaced Robin Mattson as legacy character Heather Webber on the ABC soap opera, General Hospital. She later made recurring returns to soap. In 2023, Mills received a Daytime Emmy Award for Outstanding Guest Performer in a Drama Series for General Hospital. Also in 2023, Mills guest-starred alongside her The Wonder Years co-star, Dan Lauria, in an episode of Fox series Fantasy Island.

== Personal life ==
Mills was married to author, film, television and stage actor Orson Bean from 1993 until his death in 2020.

== Filmography ==
=== Film ===
Year	Title	Role	Notes
1970	Diary of a Mad Housewife	Women's lib girl	
1983	Going Berserk	Nancy Reese	
1984	Young Lust	Sheila Danner	
2002	Jane White Is Sick & Twisted	Mom	
2002	Never Get Outta the Boat	Jean	
2004	Tricks	Ruth	
2009	A Golden Christmas	Katherine Wright	
2011	Satin	Rose Wells	
2012	Hating Breitbart	Herself	
2014	Maybe Someday	Martha Donnelly	
2014	Dr. Quinn, Morphine Woman with Jane Seymour	Marjorie Quinn	Short film
2016	Wake Up America!	Senior	Short film
2019	The Fiddling Horse	Ethel Truman	
2022	Last Chance Charlene	Lorenna	
2026	33 Days	Elizabeth	

=== Television ===
Year	Title	Role	Notes
1978	The Waltons	Nancy	Episode: "The Obsession"
1979	Kaz	Gail	Episode: "They've Taken Our Daughter"
1979–1980	The Associates	Leslie Dunn	Main role
1980	Rape and Marriage: The Rideout Case	Wanda	TV movie
1981	A Matter of Life and Death	Allison Cross	TV movie
1981	Lou Grant	Lisa	Episode: "Search"
1982	Making the Grade	Sara Conover	Main role
1982	Hill Street Blues	Tracy Renko	4 episodes
1983	Newhart	Professor	Episode: "Sprained Dreams"
1983	The Other Woman	Amy Vitelli	TV movie
1983	Prototype	Dr. Rebecca Bishop	TV movie
1985	The Atlanta Child Murders	Amy Kennear	Miniseries
1986	Maggie	Charlotte Farnsworth	TV movie
1986	Moonlighting	Claire	Episode: "The Man Who Cried Wife"
1987	Mr. President	Pat	Episode: "Pilot"
1987	I Married Dora	Janine Desmond	Episodes: "Where There's a Will, There's No Way", "West Coast Story"
1987	Punky Brewster	Donna Deaton	Episodes: "Open Door, Broken Heart: Parts 1 & 2"
1988	To Heal a Nation	Sue, Stone Worker	TV movie
1988–1993	The Wonder Years	Norma Arnold	Main role
1989	I Love You Perfect	Gloria	TV movie
1990	ABC Afterschool Special	Linda	Episode: "Testing Dirty"
1992	Jonathan: The Boy Nobody Wanted	Carol Willis	TV movie
1992–1994	Vicki!	Herself	Guest host
1993	Tainted Blood	Mrs. Patterson	TV movie
1993–1997	Dr. Quinn, Medicine Woman	Saloon Woman, Marjorie Quinn	1 episode (season 1, uncredited), 11 episodes (seasons 2–6)
1994	CBS Schoolbreak Special	Carol Oliver	Episode: "Love in the Dark Ages"
1994	Moment of Truth: Caught in the Crossfire	Royce Payne	TV movie
1995	Family Reunion: A Relative Nightmare	Portia	TV movie
1995	Deadline for Murder: From the Files of Edna Buchanan	Julie Cresta	TV movie
1998	Touched by an Angel	Liz	Episode: "Last Dance"
1999	Profiler	Amber Wiley	Episode: "Inheritance"
1999–2000	Popular	Robin John	Episodes: "Wild, Wild Mess", "Ch-Ch-Changes", "The Consequences of Falling"
2000	The Beach Boys: An American Family	Audree Wilson	TV movie
2000	NYPD Blue	Sonya Morrow	Episode: "This Old Spouse"
2001–2005	Yes, Dear	Jenny Ludke	Recurring role
2002	Girlfriends	Lynn's Mother	Episode: "Don't Leave Me a Loan"
2002–2003	Sabrina the Teenage Witch	Diana Spellman	Episodes: "The Whole Ball of Wax", "Soul Mates"
2003	Strong Medicine	Rhonda LaCouer	Episode: "Prescriptions"
2006–2019, 2021–2022, 2024	The Bold and the Beautiful	Pamela "Pam" Douglas	Regular/Recurring/Guest: 694 Episodes
2011	3 Holiday Tails	Katherine Wright	
2015	Appetite for Love	Tallulah Jones	TV movie
2015	Reluctant Nanny	Irene	
2019	Teachers	Joanna Bennigan	2 episodes
2022–2024; 2026–present	General Hospital	Heather Webber	Recurring: 54 Episodes
2023	Fantasy Island	Vivian Hutchinson	Episode: "War of the Roses (And the Hutchinsons)"
