= Josh Saviano =

American actor and lawyer (born 1976)

- Born: March 31, 1976 (age 50); White Plains, New York, U.S.
- Education: Yale University (BA); Yeshiva University (JD)
- Occupations: Lawyer, former child actor
- Years active: 1987–1993, 2014–2016
- Children: 1

Josh Saviano (born March 31, 1976) is an American lawyer and former child actor who played Kevin Arnold's best friend, Paul Pfeiffer, in the ABC television show The Wonder Years.

== Early life ==
Saviano was born in White Plains, New York and raised in North Caldwell, New Jersey. He is Jewish. As a child, he played soccer.

== Acting ==
His role in The Wonder Years was one of his few television or movie roles. When he was not filming for The Wonder Years, he attended school in New Jersey. His first television appearance was a one-line role in a commercial for Aim toothpaste. Saviano's other roles were as Kid Belz in the movie The Wrong Guys in 1988 and Max Plotkin in the made-for-TV movie Camp Cucamonga in 1990. He appeared in an uncredited cameo in the 1989 movie The Wizard starring Fred Savage. He guest starred on the show The Ray Bradbury Theater in 1989 as Willie and on Reading Rainbow and Fun House as himself. Saviano once starred in a television commercial for the Oldsmobile Silhouette.

After The Wonder Years ended in 1993, Saviano stopped acting, went to college and became a lawyer, but from 2014 to 2015, Saviano returned to television in three episodes of Law & Order: Special Victims Unit, where his character mimicked him in real life, as an attorney.

== Law career ==
Saviano majored in political science at Yale University, where he became president of Sigma Nu fraternity. Upon graduation in 1998, he worked for a while as a paralegal for a New York City law firm. In 2000, he worked for an Internet firm before earning a J.D. degree from the Benjamin N. Cardozo School of Law at Yeshiva University. He was admitted to the bar in New York. He joined the law firm Morrison Cohen LLP becoming a senior counsel in 2011 and partner in 2013. He left Morrison Cohen in 2015 to found two start-up endeavors: law firm JDS Legal and celebrity brand consultancy Act 3 Advisors.

== Filmography ==
=== Films ===
Year	Title	Role	Notes
1988	The Wrong Guys	Kid Belz	

=== Television ===
Year	Title	Role	Notes
1989	The Ray Bradbury Theater	Willie	1 episode
1989	The All-New Mickey Mouse Club	Himself	1 episode
1989	Reading Rainbow	Himself	1 episode
1990	Camp Cucamonga	Max Plotkin	TV movie
1988–1993	The Wonder Years	Paul Pfeiffer	Main role; 115 episodes
2005	Biography	Himself	Documentary series
2014–2016	Law & Order: Special Victims Unit	Don Taft	3 episodes
