= The Wonder Years season 2 =

The Wonder Years
- Season 2
- DVD cover
- No. of episodes: 17

Release
- Original network: ABC
- Original release: November 30, 1988 – May 16, 1989

Season chronology
- ← Previous; Season 1 Next → Season 3

The second season of The Wonder Years aired on ABC from November 30, 1988, to May 16, 1989. It took place during Kevin Arnold's 1968–69 school year.

== Episodes ==
- Fred Savage, Alley Mills and Josh Saviano were present for all episodes.
- Danica McKellar was absent for 9 episodes.
- Jason Hervey was absent for 4 episodes.
- Olivia d'Abo was absent for 3 episodes.
- Dan Lauria was absent for 1 episode.

| No. overall | No. in season | Title | Directed by | Written by | Original release date | Prod. code | Viewers (millions) |
|---|---|---|---|---|---|---|---|
| 7 | 1 | "The Heart of Darkness" | Steve Miner | Neal Marlens & Carol Black | November 30, 1988 | B88501 | 24.5 |
Kevin had been having recurring nightmares about finding himself in a cave and ending up in front of his class dressed in some ridiculous way. Meanwhile, he attempts to act cool since Winnie is now involved with Kirk and hanging out with all the cool kids. Kevin and Paul fall in with an outcast named Gary (Breckin Meyer), eventually going camping where they drink beer and smoke cigarettes. When Gary invites Kevin and Paul to explore a "cave" (which is actually a long huge storm drain), Kevin must confront his fears about his nightmares. In the end, Paul and Kevin return to Kevin's house, with Kevin remarking that even a "rebel" like Gary needed friends. The next day they see Winnie and they have a few laughs together. Guest-starring: Breckin Meyer as Gary. Recurring guest: Michael Landes as Kirk McCray. Absent: Olivia d'Abo as Karen Arnold; Jason Hervey as Wayne Arnold.
| 8 | 2 | "Our Miss White" | Peter Baldwin | Michael J. Weithorn | December 7, 1988 | B88502 | 22.7 |
Kevin develops a student-teacher crush on his nice English teacher, Miss White (Wendel Meldrum), who persuades Kevin to play the lead role of Robert F. Kennedy in a school play she wrote. Recurring guest: Wendel Meldrum as Miss White. Absent: Danica McKellar as Winnie Cooper.
| 9 | 3 | "Christmas" | Steve Miner | Bob Brush | December 14, 1988 | B88503 | 19.0 |
Kevin and Wayne try to talk their father into buying a color television for Christmas; but it's not easy, as the TV costs $470. Meanwhile, Kevin tries to find a present for Winnie after he unexpectedly receives one from her. After debating on which perfume to buy her, Kevin settles for a small water globe containing a miniature figure skater. But when Kevin takes it over to Winnie, he is surprised to find that Winnie is not there to receive the present (turns out that the Coopers unexpectedly left town for Christmas because they could not bear spending their first Christmas home without Brian). Kevin leaves the present with their housesitter and then joins his family for a night of caroling--although they get rained on by an out-of-season thunderstorm. By the episode's end, it is revealed that Jack did buy the color TV--two years later.
| 10 | 4 | "Steady as She Goes" | Steve Miner | David M. Stern | January 11, 1989 | B88504 | 26.2 |
Rumors spread that Winnie and Kirk are about to break up. When Kevin finds out, he sees the situation as an opportunity that he and Winnie can perhaps get back together. Later, during choir practice, Kevin notices Winnie smiling in his direction while singing; but is disappointed when he turns around to see Kirk holding up a sign saying "I'm sorry, Winnie" through the classroom door. Kevin then gets frustrated with being alone, and asks Becky Slater (Danica McKellar's real-life sister Crystal) to go steady, primarily to try to make Winnie jealous. Meanwhile, Paul and Carla begin to have a serious relationship. Guest-starring: Crystal McKellar (Danica's sister) in her first appearance as Becky Slater. Recurring guests: Michael Landes as Kirk McCray; Krista Murphy as Carla Healey.
| 11 | 5 | "Just Between Me and You and Kirk and Paul and Carla and Becky" | Peter Baldwin | Matthew Carlson | January 18, 1989 | B88505 | 22.6 |
Kirk asks Kevin to find out whether or not Winnie still likes him. While speaking to her, Winnie tells Kevin that she will break up with Kirk soon. However, Kevin sees Kirk and Winnie kissing in the hall. Meanwhile, Becky Slater becomes furious and punches Kevin when he tells her that he just wants to be friends instead of going steady. Kevin still wants to find out if Winnie likes him, but she is confused and not sure. Recurring guests: Crystal McKellar as Becky Slater; Michael Landes as Kirk McCray; Krista Murphy as Carla Healey. Absent: Olivia d'Abo as Karen Arnold.
| 12 | 6 | "Pottery Will Get You Nowhere" | Daniel Stern | Matthew Carlson | February 1, 1989 | B88506 | 24.0 |
When Norma decides to take a pottery class, Jack is less than happy for his wife, which deeply disappoints her. Her disappointment, along with Jack's built-up anger, leads to the couple's first big fight in front of the kids. Guest-starring: Ben Stein in his first appearance as Kevin's science teacher Mr. Cantwell. Absent: Danica McKellar as Winnie Cooper. Note: This episode marks the debut of Ben Stein's recurring role as Mr. Cantwell, Kevin's mono-toned science teacher, who is teaching about natural disasters which worries Kevin and Paul.
| 13 | 7 | "Coda" | Beth Hillshafer | Todd W. Langen | February 8, 1989 | B88507 | 20.5 |
Kevin dislikes his piano lessons, until his chain-smoking instructor Mrs. Carples (Maxine Stuart) tells Norma that Kevin has talent. He continues taking lessons, and improves his playing. That is, until Ronald Hirschmuller (Joseph Dammann) decides to play the same piece as him for the recital. After he messes up at the rehearsal, Kevin decides to quit and not go to the recital, a decision he seems to regret later in life. Guest-starring: Maxine Stuart as Kevin's piano instructor Mrs. Carples; Joseph Dammann as Ronald Hirschmuller. Absent: Danica McKellar as Winnie Cooper.
| 14 | 8 | "Hiroshima, Mon Frere" | Steve Miner | Matthew Carlson | February 15, 1989 | B88508 | 22.3 |
Wayne's bullying goes too far when he tortures and inadvertently kills Kevin and Paul's hamster test subject of an experiment for their science class. The incident led to an outburst from Kevin which, although it did emotionally hurt Wayne, it finally led to a change in Wayne's attitude towards bullying Kevin--or did it? Absent: Danica McKellar as Winnie Cooper.
| 15 | 9 | "Loosiers" | Steve Miner | David M. Stern | February 22, 1989 | B88509 | 33.4 |
Paul likes to play basketball, but unfortunately he's not very good at it; therefore, during team-organizing, Paul is always picked last, which bothers Kevin. So Kevin complains to Coach Cutlip (Robert Picardo) about the unfairness of team-organizing; but to no avail, as Cutlip informs Kevin that "life is not fair." However, Cutlip picks Kevin as a captain; and in fairness Kevin attempts to pick his team members so that Paul and the other bad players are not always picked last, thereby ending up with all the bad players for his team as a result. Kevin's team ends up causing a comedic incident, which Kevin is glad "he made basketball fun again". Guest-starring: Dustin Diamond as Joey Harris. Recurring guest: Robert Picardo as Coach Cutlip. Absent: Danica McKellar as Winnie Cooper; Jason Hervey as Wayne Arnold.
| 16 | 10 | "Walkout" | Steve Miner | Matthew Carlson | March 15, 1989 | B88510 | 35.2 |
Kevin and other students on the student council try to organize a peace walkout to protest America's involvement in the Vietnam War with the "blessing" of the "coolest" teacher in the school. However, Mr. Diperna threatens to suspend students if they take part in it and "mark it down on their permanent records". This causes Kevin to debate with himself about his own career future versus the future of the country, which reaches critical mass when their supportive teacher is a no-show the day of the walkout. Kevin, in a trip to the bathroom, unintentionally initiates the walkout, which Kevin later remarks, didn't actually do anything to stop the war, but the memory of everyone singing about peace, and the marks on their permanent records, lived on. Guest-starring: Lindsay Price as Lori. Recurring guest: Raye Birk as Mr. Diperna. Absent: Danica McKellar as Winnie Cooper.
| 17 | 11 | "Nemesis" | Daniel Stern | Matthew Carlson | March 22, 1989 | B88511 | 32.1 |
Kevin learns a lesson about talking behind someone's back and making jokes about his friends. He realizes that "hell hath no fury like a woman scorned" when Becky Slater--obviously in retaliation for Kevin breaking up with her, for which she still holds a grudge against Kevin--tells everyone what Kevin said about them. Worried that Becky also told Winnie what Kevin said about her as well, Kevin hurries to Winnie's on the way home from school to try to straighten it all out. Upon learning that Winnie became ill with a stomach virus, Kevin visits her every afternoon until she gets better. However, Kevin also becomes stricken with the virus. Winnie returns the favor and visits Kevin at his house, but when Norma leaves them alone in Kevin's room, Winnie furiously turns to Kevin and scolds him severely for making jokes about her, indicating that what Kevin said about her did find its way to her. Recurring guests: Crystal McKellar as Becky Slater; Michael Landes as Kirk McCray; Krista Murphy as Carla Healey; Wendel Meldrum as Miss White. Absent: Dan Lauria as Jack Arnold; Olivia d'Abo as Karen Arnold: Jason Hervey as Wayne Arnold.
| 18 | 12 | "Fate" | Steve Miner | Bob Brush | March 29, 1989 | B88512 | 32.0 |
Winnie is still angry with Kevin for talking about her behind her back; but even so, Kevin defends her honor against school bully Eddie Pinetti (Robert Jayne). Kevin is then shocked to find out that Winnie and Eddie are dating; but in the end, Kevin's loyalty wins back Winnie's friendship when he stands up to Eddie and fights him for teasing Winnie--even though Kevin loses the fight itself. Guest-starring: Robert Jayne as school bully Eddie Pinetti. Recurring guest: Raye Birk as Mr. Diperna.
| 19 | 13 | "Birthday Boy" | Steve Miner | David M. Stern | April 12, 1989 | B88513 | 31.0 |
When Kevin's thirteenth birthday falls on the same day as Paul's Bar Mitzvah; he feels left out, especially since his family isn't really planning anything. But Kevin also becomes interested in family traditions and questions where his ancestors came from. Kevin says he cannot accept Paul's invitation due to it being on the same day as his birthday, but ultimately attends. Absent: Danica McKellar as Winnie Cooper.
| 20 | 14 | "Brightwing" | Daniel Stern | Matthew Carlson | April 26, 1989 | B88514 | 30.3 |
Karen recruits Kevin as her confidant and accomplice when he discovers she is skipping school with her friends Julie (Devon Pierce) and Sandy (Kyra Stempel) to spend time at their hippie hangout, known simply as "the hill." Kevin becomes concerned about covering for Karen after repeated encounters in the hallway of Karen's school with George Finch, a long-haired man in trendy clothes who looks young enough to be a student, but who is actually a guidance counselor investigating Karen's truancy. Kevin tries to get Karen to go back to school and quit hanging out at the hill, and she promises to do so. After bedtime, Kevin is awoken by noise of his parents frantically dialing the phone looking for Karen, whom they fear has run away. Kevin tells them to go to the hill. It was discovered that Karen was indeed trying to run away to go off with Sandy and Julie to San Francisco, but was thwarted by Norma and Jack, who bring her back home in tears. Guest-starring: Devon Pierce and Kyra Stempel as Karen's hippie friends Julie and Sandy, respectively. Absent: Danica McKellar as Winnie Cooper.
| 21 | 15 | "Square Dance" | Tom Moore | Todd W. Langen | May 3, 1989 | B88515 | 28.1 |
When Kevin is partnered for square dancing with weird girl Margaret Farquar (Lindsay Fisher), he tries to avoid her--especially when she tries to become his friend, and also when Kevin's friends--and Wayne--tease him about her. Later, Kevin panics when Margaret unexpectedly shows up at his house, but after a while of visiting, Kevin finds out that Margaret is interesting to talk to. But deep down, Kevin still wants to be friends with her and came up with a solution when he sees her at school. They could be secret friends, but Margaret doesn't buy it, and is angry that Kevin was too weak to resist teasing and peer pressure. Their brief friendship comes to an end, and Kevin later reflects that while he struggles to remember the kids he wanted to impress he never forgot Margaret. Guest-starring: Lindsay Fisher as Margaret Farquar. Recurring guest: Robert Picardo as Coach Cutlip. Absent: Danica McKellar as Winnie Cooper.
| 22 | 16 | "Whose Woods Are These?" | Peter Horton | Bob Brush | May 10, 1989 | B88516 | 25.8 |
Kevin, Winnie, and Paul try to stop the destruction of Harper's Woods, their childhood hangout, which is on a site that the city is developing for a new shopping center. They don't want it destroyed because it was the place that Winnie and Kevin hold sentimental after sharing their first kiss and also a place they all played together when they were younger. At Karen's suggestion; Kevin, Winnie, and Paul attempt to voice their concerns at a town hall meeting but fell asleep until after the meeting was adjourned. At school the next day, Kevin was caught by Mr. Diperna for not looking where he was going in the halls and was forced to "think about what he had done" in Mr. Diperna's office, where he gets into further trouble for unconsciously carving his initials on Diperna's desk. His father punished him for it after he got a call from Diperna, and Wayne bullyingly tells him to "grow up". After all of this; Kevin, Winnie, and Paul sneak outside to visit Harper's Woods one last time before it's overtaken by construction crews. They play hide and seek one more time, before they said good-bye. The final scene in the episode shows the present-day shopping center on the site, with the kids' initials carved in a sidewalk, as they once had been on a tree in Harper's Woods. Recurring guest: Raye Birk as Mr. Diperna.
| 23 | 17 | "How I'm Spending My Summer Vacation" | Michael Dinner | Jane Anderson | May 17, 1989 | B88517 | 27.4 |
It's the end of seventh grade for Kevin and a summer full of changes in his life. Winnie's parents, (H. Richard Greene and Lynn Milgrim), are separating and Kevin's favorite teacher Miss White announces she will be getting married over the summer and her new name will be Mrs. Heimer (spelled a few different ways). Paul and his family leave for an extra-long vacation for supposedly the entire summer, and Winnie and her mother will be spending the summer at her Aunt's in Maine. So this leaves Kevin sulking about having nothing to do and no one to spend his summer with. After getting an unexpected kiss from Winnie after he spills his heart about her in her yearbook, he spends the last day with Winnie at the Cooper's barbeque and thinks about Winnie's brother Brian. Kevin no longer feels angry, having gained a new perspective seeing Winnie's family tearing themselves apart in their grief. Kevin spends the rest of the summer mowing the neighbor's lawn, fishing with his dad, watching Neil Armstrong walk on the Moon and considering himself lucky to not be going through what Winnie is. Guest-starring: H. Richard Greene as Winnie's father; Lynn Milgrim as Winnie's mother. Recurring guests: Robert Picardo as Coach Cutlip; Wendel Meldrum as Miss White; Ben Stein as Mr. Cantwell.
