= List of The Wonder Years episodes =

The episode list for the ABC comedy-drama series The Wonder Years. The series premiered on January 31, 1988 and ran for a total of 115 episodes spanning 6 seasons ending on May 12, 1993.

Originally, none of the seasons were available on DVD as official season box sets due to the cost of securing the music rights. (See The Wonder Years article for more detailed information.) Time Life released the complete series on DVD October 10, 2014.

== Series overview ==
Season	Episodes	Originally released		Rank	Rating
Season	Episodes	First released	Last released	Rank	Rating
1	6	January 31, 1988	April 19, 1988	10	18.8 (Note: Tied with ALF)
2	17	November 30, 1988	May 16, 1989	22	16.3 (Note: Tied with The Hogan Family and The NBC Sunday Night Movie)
3	23	October 3, 1989	May 16, 1990	8	19.2
4	23	September 19, 1990	May 15, 1991	30	14.2
5	24	October 2, 1991	May 13, 1992	32	12.9
6	22	September 23, 1992	May 12, 1993	54	10.3

== Episodes ==
=== Season 1 (1988) ===
No. overall	No. in season	Title	Directed by	Written by	Original release date	Prod. code	Rating/share (households)
1	1	"Pilot"	Steve Miner	Neal Marlens & Carol Black	January 31, 1988	B88003	17.9/31
2	2	"Swingers"	Neal Marlens & Carol Black	Neal Marlens & Carol Black	March 22, 1988	B88101	19.5/30
3	3	"My Father's Office"	Jeffrey Brown	Neal Marlens & Carol Black	March 29, 1988	B88102	19.2/30
4	4	"Angel"	Art Wolff	Neal Marlens & Carol Black	April 5, 1988	B88103	17.1/28
5	5	"The Phone Call"	Jeffrey Brown	A. Scott Frank	April 12, 1988	B88104	17.7/28
6	6	"Dance with Me"	Arlene Sanford	David M. Stern	April 19, 1988	B88105	17.6/27

=== Season 2 (1988–89) ===
No. overall	No. in season	Title	Directed by	Written by	Original release date	Prod. code	Viewers (millions)
7	1	"The Heart of Darkness"	Steve Miner	Neal Marlens & Carol Black	November 30, 1988	B88501	24.5
8	2	"Our Miss White"	Peter Baldwin	Michael J. Weithorn	December 7, 1988	B88502	22.7
9	3	"Christmas"	Steve Miner	Bob Brush	December 14, 1988	B88503	19.0
10	4	"Steady as She Goes"	Steve Miner	David M. Stern	January 11, 1989	B88504	26.2
11	5	"Just Between Me and You and Kirk and Paul and Carla and Becky"	Peter Baldwin	Matthew Carlson	January 18, 1989	B88505	22.6
12	6	"Pottery Will Get You Nowhere"	Daniel Stern	Matthew Carlson	February 1, 1989	B88506	24.0
13	7	"Coda"	Beth Hillshafer	Todd W. Langen	February 8, 1989	B88507	20.5
14	8	"Hiroshima, Mon Frere"	Steve Miner	Matthew Carlson	February 15, 1989	B88508	22.3
15	9	"Loosiers"	Steve Miner	David M. Stern	February 28, 1989	B88509	33.4
16	10	"Walkout"	Steve Miner	Matthew Carlson	March 7, 1989	B88510	35.2
17	11	"Nemesis"	Daniel Stern	Matthew Carlson	March 14, 1989	B88511	32.1
18	12	"Fate"	Steve Miner	Bob Brush	March 28, 1989	B88512	32.0
19	13	"Birthday Boy"	Steve Miner	David M. Stern	April 11, 1989	B88513	31.0
20	14	"Brightwing"	Daniel Stern	Matthew Carlson	April 18, 1989	B88514	30.3
21	15	"Square Dance"	Tom Moore	Todd W. Langen	May 2, 1989	B88515	28.1
22	16	"Whose Woods Are These?"	Peter Horton	Bob Brush	May 9, 1989	B88516	25.8
23	17	"How I'm Spending My Summer Vacation"	Michael Dinner	Jane Anderson	May 16, 1989	B88517	27.4

=== Season 3 (1989–90) ===
No. overall	No. in season	Title	Directed by	Written by	Original release date	Prod. code	Viewers (millions)
24	1	"Summer Song"	Michael Dinner	Mark B. Perry	October 3, 1989	B89501	34.5
25	2	"Math Class"	Andy Tennant	Tom Gammill & Max Pross	October 10, 1989	B89502	33.0
26	3	"Wayne on Wheels"	Beth Hillshafer	Mark B. Perry	October 24, 1989	B89504	32.2
27	4	"Mom Wars"	Daniel Stern	Todd W. Langen	October 31, 1989	B89503	25.9
28	5	"On the Spot" "Our Town"	Matia Karrell	Matthew Carlson	November 7, 1989	B89505	29.0
29	6	"Odd Man Out"	Peter Baldwin	David M. Stern	November 14, 1989	B89506	29.7
30	7	"The Family Car"	Michael Dinner	Debra Frank & Jack Weinstein	November 21, 1989	B89507	35.9
31	8	"The Pimple"	Matia Karrell	David M. Stern & Todd W. Langen	November 28, 1989	B89509	30.2
32	9	"Math Class Squared"	Daniel Stern	Matthew Carlson	December 12, 1989	B89510	30.2
33	10	"Rock 'n' Roll"	Michael Dinner	Bob Stevens	January 2, 1990	B89508	34.3
34	11	"Don't You Know Anything About Women?"	Jeff Brown	Tammy Ader	January 16, 1990	B89511	30.1
35	12	"The Powers That Be"	Daniel Stern	David M. Stern	January 23, 1990	B89512	33.3
36	13	"She, My Friend and I"	Peter Baldwin	Kerry Ehrin	February 6, 1990	B89513	32.5
37	14	"St. Valentine's Day Massacre"	Matia Karrell	Mark B. Perry	February 13, 1990	B89514	29.7
38	15	"The Tree House"	Michael Dinner	Story by : David M. Stern; Teleplay by : Matthew Carlson	February 20, 1990	B89515	30.5
39	16	"Glee Club"	Jim McBride	Story by : Bob Brush & Todd W. Langen; Teleplay by : Todd W. Langen	February 27, 1990	B89516	30.3
40	17	"Night Out"	Dan Lauria	Story by : Tammy Ader; Teleplay by : Todd W. Langen & Mark B. Perry	March 13, 1990	B89517	30.7
41	18	"Faith" "Death & Taxes"	Michael Dinner	Story by : Bob Brush & Matthew Carlson; Teleplay by : Matthew Carlson	March 27, 1990	B89518	27.4
42	19	"The Unnatural"	Nick Marck	Ian Gurvitz	April 17, 1990	B89519	27.9
43	20	"Good-bye"	Michael Dinner	Bob Brush	April 24, 1990	B89520	24.4
44	21	"Cocoa and Sympathy"	Peter Baldwin	Winnie Holzman	May 1, 1990	B89521	25.7
45	22	"Daddy's Little Girl"	Jim McBride	Todd W. Langen & Mark B. Perry	May 8, 1990	B89522	24.1
46	23	"Moving"	Michael Dinner	Jill Gordon & Bob Brush	May 16, 1990	B89523	20.4

=== Season 4 (1990–91) ===
No. overall	No. in season	Title	Directed by	Written by	Original release date	Prod. code	Viewers (millions)
47	1	"Growing Up"	Michael Dinner	Bob Brush	September 19, 1990	B90501	24.0
48	2	"Ninth Grade Man"	Daniel Stern	Jill Gordon	September 26, 1990	B90502	22.4
49	3	"The Journey"	Peter Werner	Jeffrey Stepakoff	October 3, 1990	B90503	23.1
50	4	"The Cost of Living"	Nick Marck	Mark Levin	October 10, 1990	B90504	24.2
51	5	"It's a Mad, Mad, Madeline World"	Rob Thompson	Eric Gilliland & Jeffrey Stepakoff	October 24, 1990	B90506	25.2
52	6	"Little Debbie"	Michael Dinner	Mark B. Perry	November 7, 1990	B90505	23.4
53	7	"The Ties that Bind"	Peter Baldwin	Mark B. Perry	November 14, 1990	B90508	24.6
54	8	"The Sixth Man"	Nick Marck	David Chambers	November 28, 1990	B90507	24.1
55	9	"A Very Cutlip Christmas"	Michael Dinner	Suggested by Material by : Gene Wolande; Teleplay by : Mark Levin	December 12, 1990	B90509	20.5
56	10	"The Candidate"	Neal Israel	Story by : David Chambers & Eric Gilliland; Teleplay by : Eric Gilliland	January 9, 1991	B90510	22.6
57	11	"Heartbreak"	Andy Tennant	David Chambers	January 23, 1991	B90511	23.2
58	12	"Denial"	Richard Masur	Story by : Mark Levin & David Chambers; Teleplay by : Mark Levin	January 30, 1991	B90513	22.6
59	13	"Who's Aunt Rose?"	Rob Thompson	Story by : Jill Gordon; Teleplay by : Mark B. Perry	February 6, 1991	B90512	22.1
60	14	"Courage"	Daniel Stern	Mark B. Perry	February 13, 1991	B90515	22.3
61	15	"Buster"	Nick Marck	Story by : Jeffrey Stepakoff; Teleplay by : Jill Gordon & Mark B. Perry	February 27, 1991	B90514	21.2
62	16	"Road Trip"	Ken Topolsky	David Chambers	March 6, 1991	B90516	20.6
63	17	"When Worlds Collide"	Lyndall Hobbs	Eric Gilliland	March 20, 1991	B90517	23.2
64	18	"Separate Rooms"	Michael Dinner	Story by : Jill Gordon & Bob Brush; Teleplay by : Bob Brush	April 3, 1991	B90518	21.4
65	19	"The Yearbook"	Neal Israel	David Chambers	April 10, 1991	B90519	17.4
66	20	"The Accident"	Richard Masur	Story by : Jill Gordon & Bob Brush; Teleplay by : Jill Gordon	April 24, 1991	B90520	18.3
67	21	"The House that Jack Built"	Ken Topolsky	Mark B. Perry & Mark Levin	May 1, 1991	B90521	15.5
68	22	"Graduation"	Michael Dinner	Bob Brush	May 8, 1991	B90522	15.6
69	23	"The Wonder Years: Looking Back..."	Nick Marck	Mark B. Perry & Mark Levin	May 15, 1991	B90523	14.3

=== Season 5 (1991–92) ===
No. overall	No. in season	Title	Directed by	Written by	Original release date	Prod. code	Viewers (millions)
70	1	"The Lake"	Michael Dinner	Mark Levin	October 2, 1991	02S0059101	23.5
71	2	"Day One"	Daniel Stern	Denise Moss & Sy Dukane	October 9, 1991	02S0059102	23.4
72	3	"The Hardware Store"	Ken Topolsky	Craig Hoffman	October 16, 1991	02S0059103	21.7
73	4	"Frank and Denise"	David Greenwalt	David Greenwalt	October 23, 1991	02S0059104	20.5
74	5	"Full Moon Rising"	Ken Topolsky	Mark B. Perry	October 30, 1991	02S0059105	20.5
75	6	"Triangle"	Daniel Stern	Sy Rosen	November 6, 1991	02S0059106	22.8
76	7	"Soccer"	Thomas Schlamme	Mark Levin	November 20, 1991	02S0059107	22.5
77	8	"Dinner Out"	Bryan Gordon	Gina Goldman	December 4, 1991	02S0059108	19.8
78	9	"Christmas Party"	Jim McBride	Sy Dukane & Denise Moss	December 11, 1991	02S0059110	20.2
79	10	"Pfeiffers' Pfortune"	Ken Topolsky	Mark B. Perry	December 18, 1991	02S0059109	18.7
80	11	"Road Test"	Thomas Schlamme	Craig Hoffman	January 8, 1992	02S0059111	21.2
81	12	"Grandpa's Car"	Michael Dinner	Mark Levin	January 15, 1992	02S0059112	21.7
82	13	"Kodachrome"	David Greenwalt	Gina Goldman	January 29, 1992	02S0059113	20.2
83	14	"Private Butthead"	Nick Marck	Sy Rosen	February 5, 1992	02S0059114	21.8
84	15	"Of Mastodons and Men"	Thomas Schlamme	Mark Levin	February 12, 1992	02S0059116	17.9
85	16	"Double Double Date"	Peter Baldwin	Sy Rosen & Mark B. Perry	February 26, 1992	02S0059115	22.9
86	17	"Hero"	Stephen Cragg	David Greenwalt	March 11, 1992	02S0059117	18.8
87	18	"Lunch Stories"	Ken Topolsky	Sy Dukane & Denise Moss	March 18, 1992	02S0059118	19.2
88	19	"Carnal Knowledge"	Nancy Cooperstein	David Greenwalt	March 25, 1992	02S0059119	19.3
89	20	"The Lost Weekend"	Arthur Albert	Story by : Rob Cohen; Teleplay by : Sivert Glarum & Stephen Jenkins	April 8, 1992	02S0059120	16.3
90	21	"Stormy Weather"	Ken Topolsky	Denise Moss & Sy Dukane	April 22, 1992	02S0059121	17.2
91	22	"The Wedding"	Peter Baldwin	Mark B. Perry	April 29, 1992	02S0059122	15.3
92	23	"Back to the Lake"	Michael Dinner	Mark Levin	May 6, 1992	02S0059123	17.1
93	24	"Broken Hearts and Burgers"	Ken Topolsky	Craig Hoffman	May 13, 1992	02S0059124	15.8

=== Season 6 (1992–93) ===
No. overall	No. in season	Title	Directed by	Written by	Original release date	Prod. code	Viewers (millions)
94	1	"Homecoming"	Michael Dinner	Bob Brush	September 23, 1992	02S0059202	15.9
95	2	"Fishing"	Greg Beeman	Phil Doran	September 30, 1992	02S0059203	16.3
96	3	"Scenes from a Wedding"	Michael Dinner	Story by : Michael Curtis & Greg Malins; Teleplay by : Jon Harmon Feldman	October 7, 1992	02S0059204	15.7
97	4	"Sex and Economics"	Ken Topolsky	Story by : John Bunzel; Teleplay by : Jon Harmon Feldman	October 14, 1992	02S0059201	17.5
98	5	"Politics as Usual"	Bryan Gordon	Craig Hoffman	October 21, 1992	02S0059205	16.0
99	6	"White Lies"	Peter Baldwin	Jon Harmon Feldman & Robin Riordan	October 28, 1992	02S0059206	18.5
100	7	"Wayne and Bonnie"	Greg Beeman	Sy Rosen	November 11, 1992	02S0059207	16.9
101	8	"Kevin Delivers"	Arthur Albert	Frank Renzulli	November 25, 1992	02S0059208	14.6
102	9	"The Test"	Ken Topolsky	Robin Riordan	December 2, 1992	02S0059209	14.1
103	10	"Let Nothing You Dismay"	Ken Topolsky	Craig Hoffman	December 16, 1992	02S0059210	13.0
104	11	"New Years"	Tom Moore	Jon Harmon Feldman	January 6, 1993	02S0059211	16.2
105	12	"Alice in Autoland"	Arthur Albert	Robin Riordan	January 13, 1993	02S0059212	17.8
106	13	"Ladies and Gentlemen...The Rolling Stones"	Peter Baldwin	Kim Friese	January 27, 1993	02S0059213	N/A
107	14	"Unpacking"	Greg Beeman	Sy Rosen & Bob Brush	February 3, 1993	02S0059214	14.3
108	15	"Hulk Arnold"	Ken Topolsky	Kim Friese	February 10, 1993	02S0059215	20.8
109	16	"Nose"	David Greenwalt	Sy Rosen	February 24, 1993	02S0059216	14.2
110	17	"Eclipse"	Stephen Cragg	Craig Hoffman	March 3, 1993	02S0059217	16.9
111	18	"Poker"	David Greenwalt	Story by : Max Mutchnick & David Kohan; Teleplay by : Jon Harmon Feldman	March 24, 1993	02S0059218	13.6
112	19	"The Little Women"	Ken Topolsky	David M. Wolf	March 31, 1993	02S0059219	14.9
113	20	"Reunion"	Arthur Albert	Story by : Mark B. Perry; Teleplay by : Robin Riordan	April 28, 1993	02S0059220	12.2
114	21	"Summer"	Michael Dinner	Sy Rosen	May 12, 1993	02S0059221	21.0
115	22	"Independence Day"	Michael Dinner	Bob Brush	May 12, 1993	02S0059222	21.0
