= The Wonder Years season 3 =

The Wonder Years
- Season 3
- DVD cover
- No. of episodes: 23

Release
- Original network: ABC
- Original release: October 3, 1989 – May 16, 1990

Season chronology
- ← Previous; Season 2 Next → Season 4

The third season of The Wonder Years aired on ABC from October 3, 1989, to May 16, 1990.

== Episodes ==
- Fred Savage was present for all episodes.
- Olivia d'Abo was absent for 11 episodes.
- Danica McKellar was absent for 7 episodes.
- Dan Lauria and Alley Mills were both absent for 6 episodes each.
- Jason Hervey was absent for 3 episodes.
- Josh Saviano was absent for 1 episode.
- Daniel Stern was present for all episodes.

No. overall	No. in season	Title	Directed by	Written by	Original release date	Prod. code	Viewers (millions)
24	1	"Summer Song"	Michael Dinner	Mark B. Perry	October 10, 1989	B89501	34.5
In the remaining days of summer, the Arnolds decide to take a vacation trip to Ocean City, in part for old times' sake, since it was Jack and Norma's honeymoon destination. Paul comes along, but the vacation turns out to be a disaster, as Paul gets car-sick and throws up a couple of times and later appears to get sunburned but actually develops an allergic reaction to fish he ate, which forces him to stay inside for the remainder of the week-long vacation; add to that Wayne's constant bullying, Karen's belly-aching and complaining, and Jack's constant complaining about the high prices. So Kevin, now feeling more alone than ever, decides to take a stroll along the beach in search of a little solace, where he encounters Teri (Holly Sampson), a beautiful (although older) girl who also seems alone, but more upbeat and optimistic. Kevin and Teri plan a date to the boardwalk arcade the next day. Their date ends with a kiss under a pier, but the moment is ruined when Teri turns down a second date for the next day, because she and her family got called back home to Albuquerque due to her father's job. Teri promised to write to Kevin every so often until they met again; but after only one letter, Kevin never heard from her again. Guest-starring: Holly Sampson as Teri; Juliette Lewis as Wayne's girlfriend Delores.
25	2	"Math Class"	Andy Tennant	Tom Gammill & Max Pross	October 17, 1989	B89502	33.0
As Kevin begins eighth grade, he finds himself struggling in math and quickly has trouble understanding it. But when his very strict math teacher Mr. Collins (Steven Gilborn) offers him a study group after class, Kevin refuses when he sees the group is composed of the dumbest kids in school. Kevin then receives bad grades on pop quizzes and fails a test. Eventually, he must tell his dad about the situation and he starts to turn things around. Guest-starring: Steven Gilborn in his first appearance as Kevin's math teacher Mr. Collins. Absent: Danica McKellar as Winnie Cooper.
26	3	"Wayne on Wheels"	Beth Hillshafer	Mark B. Perry	October 24, 1989	B89504	32.2
Wayne gets his driver's license but reluctantly has to chauffeur Kevin and Paul to the mall. While there, Kevin meets his "dream girl" (Jennifer Barron) whom he follows to the movie theater where Romeo and Juliet is playing. When Kevin finally gets his chance to introduce himself and talk to her, Wayne shows up and embarrasses him by driving away every time he reaches for the door handle. This stunt causes Jack and Norma to suspend Wayne's driving privileges. The night that he gets the keys back, he has to drive Kevin to the mall to meet up with his crush, at the same time he plans to use the car for a date with Dolores. When Kevin refuses to exit the car far short of his destination, Wayne deliberately recklessly joyrides in order to scare him. They crash in to a cornfield causing tire blowouts and minor damage to the car, but Wayne shows remorse and asks if Kevin is okay. They drive home quietly, and both lie to Jack that the accident wasn't Wayne's fault. Guest-starring: Jennifer Barron as Kevin's unnamed "dream girl" (his mall crush). Recurring guest: Juliette Lewis as Delores. Absent: Olivia d'Abo as Karen Arnold; Danica McKellar as Winnie Cooper.
27	4	"Mom Wars"	Daniel Stern	Todd W. Langen	October 31, 1989	B89503	25.9
Against his mother's wishes, Kevin decides to play "no-equipment" football in Shepherd's Park with his friends after school. After finding blood on his shirt, Norma (Alley Mills) tries taking Kevin clothes shopping to distract him from playing, but it backfires. Kevin soon realizes that this game is dangerous when he gets hurt while being gang tackled. Kevin finally gets what he wished for when Norma stops babying him and tells him to bandage the wound himself. Guest-starring: Sean Baca in his first appearance as Craig Hobson; Brandon Crane in his first appearance as Doug Porter; Michael Tricario in his first appearance as Randy Mitchell. Absent: Danica McKellar as Winnie Cooper.
28	5	"On the Spot" "Our Town"	Matia Karrell	Matthew Carlson	November 7, 1989	B89505	29.0
The new dramatic arts teacher Mr. Weber (Nicholas Hormann) is holding auditions for the school play Our Town, where Winnie and Paul audition. Paul is rejected while Winnie gets the leading role of Emily Webb, whereas Paul becomes heartened when he works on the crew alongside Kevin, who sees it as a chance to get out of gym class. When Paul falls ill, it's up to Kevin to run the spotlight, which he awkwardly does until Winnie's moving performance inspires him to realize the importance of being on a play's crew, and leads her father to move back in with her and her mother. Guest-starring: Nicholas Hormann as Winnie's dramatic arts teacher Mr. Weber.
29	6	"Odd Man Out"	Peter Baldwin	David M. Stern	November 14, 1989	B89506	29.7
After a heated argument over their elusive Willie McCovey baseball card trade, Kevin and Paul choose new best friends. Kevin hangs out with Doug Porter, and initially it goes great, but eventually he finds Doug too passive, and Doug eventually prefers to hang out with Paul's new best friend Brady Ryland. Kevin and Paul realize they missed each other's companionship. Guest-starring: Marty Belafsky as Brady Ryland. Recurring guest: Brandon Crane as Doug Porter, who was originally intended as a one-shot character, but impressed the producers that they gave him a recurring role where he is shown as a friend of both Kevin and Paul. Absent: Dan Lauria as Jack Arnold; Alley Mills as Norma Arnold; Olivia d'Abo as Karen Arnold; Jason Hervey as Wayne Arnold.
30	7	"The Family Car"	Michael Dinner	Debra Frank & Jack Weinstein	November 21, 1989	B89507	35.9
The Arnolds notice one of their neighbors driving home a new car, while the Arnolds' family station wagon just isn't roadworthy anymore; so in "keeping up with the Joneses," they decide to buy a new car, too (after Norma pressures Jack into doing so). The Arnolds then visit a car dealership and, at the persuading of salesman Marvin Lutz (Patrick Cronin)--and the kids--Jack selects a new cherry-red '69 Ford Mustang convertible and is ready to seal the deal. However, Jack blows up and backs out of the deal when he thinks Lutz didn't offer him a fair trade-in value for their old car. Meanwhile, Jack decides to fix up and wash the station wagon and put it up for sale. But when Jack informs prospective buyers of his price, they walk away laughing, thinking the price is outrageously high--which leads to Karen offending her father by calling him "cheap." However, in the end, the Arnolds do end up buying a new car, but it's not the Mustang. It turns out to be a 1969 Galaxie 500. As the station wagon ends up being towed away to the junkyard, Kevin has memories of road trips and realizes why it was so hard for his father to dispose of the car. With the neighbors admiring the Arnold's new Ford, Kevin said it was the Arnolds' turn to be "king for a day". Guest-starring: Patrick Cronin as car salesman Marvin Lutz. Recurring guest: Sean Baca as Craig Hobson.
31	8	"The Pimple"	Matia Karrell	David M. Stern & Todd W. Langen	November 28, 1989	B89509	30.2
Kevin gets his first pimple a few days before family friends, the Pruitts and their beautiful daughter Gina (Heather Green), come for a visit. As he desperately tries to get rid of his pimple, Kevin goes as far as paying Wayne for his zit cream to covering it with a band-aid and telling Winnie he got into a fight with school bully Tony Barbella (Tony Nittoli). Unfortunately for Kevin, none of these tactics work, and Kevin must face the music—and the Pruetts—with his pimple, only to discover that coincidentally Gina had developed her first pimple, too. Guest-starring: Tony Nittoli as school bully Tony Barbella; Heather Green as Gina Pruitt.
32	9	"Math Class Squared"	Daniel Stern	Matthew Carlson	December 12, 1989	B89510	30.2
Kevin overhears classmate Eddie McCormick (Chris Demetral) having a conversation with two others about cheating in his math class. After being graded on a curve because of the cheaters, Kevin decides he wants in and asks Eddie "How 'bout those Mets," the secret code that he's on board. As a result, his grades rise to near perfect and he is put in the honor math class. While McCormick and his cohorts flunk an exam, Kevin feels he is punished with this new class. Mr. Collins (Steven Gilborn) offers Kevin to revert to his old math class and keep his grades up. Guest-starring: Chris Demetral as Eddie McCormick. Recurring guest: Steven Gilborn as Mr. Collins. Absent: Dan Lauria as Jack Arnold; Olivia d'Abo as Karen Arnold; Jason Hervey as Wayne Arnold.
33	10	"Rock 'n' Roll"	Michael Dinner	Bob Stevens	January 2, 1990	B89508	34.3
After helping the new student from San Francisco, Larry Beaman (Joshua John Miller), get out of trouble with vice-principal Diperna (Raye Birk) when he's not allowed to play his guitar on school property, Larry teaches Kevin how to play guitar. Inspired by The Beatles, they form a rock 'n' roll band called the "Electric Shoes" and land a gig at an 8th-grade birthday party for Amy Ermin (Stefanie Scott), but are forced to stop playing by her father (Ben Slack) and the police because they're too loud. Guest-starring: Joshua John Miller as lead guitarist Larry Beaman; Casey Ellison as drummer Mark Bernstein; Dana Young as bassist Neal Rhodes; Stefanie Scott as Amy Ermin; Ben Slack as Amy Ermin's father. Recurring guest: Raye Birk as Mr. Diperna.
34	11	"Don't You Know Anything About Women?"	Jeff Brown	Tammy Ader	January 16, 1990	B89511	30.1
Both being dateless for the upcoming school dance, Kevin and lab partner Linda Sloan (Maia Brewton) agree to go to the dance "as friends." But soon after, Kevin's latest crush, a girl with a Southern accent named Susan Fisher (Kelly Packard), asks him to save a dance for her. This now puts Kevin in a predicament as he is now torn between Susan and Linda as to whom to spend more time with at the dance. Kevin lets Linda dance with Steve Padway (Andy Howard), a boy who has a crush on Linda, while Kevin dances with Susan; but Kevin unfortunately has nothing to have a conversation with Susan about afterwards and she therefore finds her ex-boyfriend Donald Wallach (Sean Wohland) and they get back together. Kevin inadvertently hurts Linda's feelings by still pining for Susan. He apologizes, but their mutual feelings of embarrassment had changed their friendship. She chooses to go off and dance with Steve again. Meanwhile, after a short break-up, Paul and Carla get back together, now making Kevin feel totally left out. Now alone, Kevin searches for another free girl to dance with. Coincidentally, it just so happens that Winnie shows up at the dance, also dateless. But unfortunately, while searching for dance partners, both Kevin and Winnie miss seeing each other and Kevin finally leaves the dance. Guest-starring: Maia Brewton as Linda Sloan; Kelly Packard as Susan Fisher; Andy Howard as Steve Padway; Sean Wohland as Donald Wallach. Recurring guests: Krista Murphy as Carla Healey; Ben Stein as Mr. Cantwell. Absent: Dan Lauria as Jack Arnold; Alley Mills as Norma Arnold; Olivia d'Abo as Karen Arnold.
35	12	"The Powers That Be"	Daniel Stern	David M. Stern	January 23, 1990	B89512	33.3
Grandpa Arnold (David Huddleston) visits the Arnolds, and Jack is clearly on edge. Among the gifts he brings for the Arnold kids, one is a surprise for Kevin—a puppy. But Jack forbids it, thinking that Kevin can't handle the responsibility of taking care of a pet. He reluctantly agrees to let Kevin keep it, so long as he is stringent with taking care of it. Jack and Grandpa Arnold clash throughout the episode, culminating in a fight at the dinner table about (among other things) bringing a pet in to the home without consulting anyone first. Kevin is tired of the fighting, doesn't want to keep the puppy if it brings so much grief, and just hates seeing two men that he loves and admires acting this way. Grandpa leaves the next morning, and Jack is waiting outside with the puppy. He reasons with Kevin that the family needs a dog, and that it would be good for him and Kevin as well. They then walk the dog together. Guest-starring: David Huddleston in his first appearance as Grandpa Arnold Absent: Danica McKellar as Winnie Cooper.
36	13	"She, My Friend and I"	Peter Baldwin	Kerry Ehrin	February 6, 1990	B89513	32.5
When Paul gets dumped by Carla, Kevin wants to help his brokenhearted friend get his self-confidence back. While he helps Paul think of other available girls to date, Kevin is stunned to discover that Paul is interested in dating Winnie, but Paul is shy about asking her out because he feels awkward about dating his best friend's ex. So to ease the pressure for Paul, Kevin coaxes Winnie into asking Paul out on a date; but after going out three times, things take an unexpected turn when Paul actually starts falling for Winnie, making Kevin jealous. Winnie doesn't feel the same way about Paul and tells him she still likes Kevin, but wants to keep it a secret. However, Kevin finds out and goes to Winnie's to tell her that "he knows she's crazy about him," only to get the door slammed in his face. Part one of two. Recurring guests: Krista Murphy as Carla Healey; Robert Picardo as Coach Cutlip. Absent: Alley Mills as Norma Arnold; Olivia d'Abo as Karen Arnold. Note: While this episode was not necessarily the first two-part episode, it was the first one to show the caption, "To be continued..." at the end of the first part.
37	14	"St. Valentine's Day Massacre"	Matia Karrell	Mark B. Perry	February 13, 1990	B89514	29.7
Things get complicated for Kevin when his please-forgive-me valentine meant for Winnie ends up by mistake in the locker of Becky Slater who, because of it, wants to rekindle their short-lived romance. But Kevin informs Becky that the valentine was not meant for her, making her mad at Kevin once again. Therefore, Becky seeks revenge by trying to run Kevin off the sidewalk with her bike; but Curtis Hartsell (Fred Savage's younger brother Ben, playing the role of Cupid) winds up in Becky's path, causing her to crash into Craig Hobson, making a love connection. Kevin seeks advice on love from Mrs. Heimer (the former Miss White) and she tells him to speak from the heart which he does to Winnie, finally confessing that he likes her. Part two of two. Guest-starring: Ben Savage as Curtis Hartsell; Elyse Eberstein as Winnie's friend Melissa Bemil; Jean Palmerton as Kevin's art teacher Mr. Dougherty. Recurring guests: Crystal McKellar as Becky Slater; Wendel Meldrum as Mrs. Heimer (nee White); Sean Baca as Craig Hobson. Absent: Dan Lauria as Jack Arnold; Alley Mills as Norma Arnold; Olivia d'Abo as Karen Arnold; Jason Hervey as Wayne Arnold.
38	15	"The Tree House"	Michael Dinner	Story by : David M. Stern; Teleplay by : Matthew Carlson	February 20, 1990	B89515	30.5
After seeing a shocked look on his friend Doug Porter's face after he receives "the talk" from his father, Kevin wonders when his time will come. Meanwhile, Jack has a week off from work, and he has nothing to do around the house but repairs, which upsets the balance of Norma's household. So Norma suggests that he and Kevin build a tree house together. Jack lets Kevin help by allowing him to use his power tools and things run smoothly until they go up on the platform to look at the view of the neighborhood. The elevated platform also allows them to catch a glimpse of their voluptuous neighbor Donna (Janet Wood) singing while working her tomato garden. This causes Jack and Kevin to share an awkward moment, especially when Norma invites Donna over for a visit. Norma eventually decides to check on their progress and sees the same view of her neighbor, which makes Norma a little uncomfortable. Channeling Norma's response, Jack then has a different talk with Kevin and admits that he's too old for a tree house after all, which stops the construction altogether. In the final scene of the episode, the platform of the incomplete tree house starts to collapse. Guest-starring: Janet Wood as the Arnolds' neighbor Donna. Recurring guest: Brandon Crane as Doug Porter.'Sean Baca as Craig Hobson. Absent: Olivia d'Abo as Karen Arnold; Danica McKellar as Winnie Cooper.
39	16	"Glee Club"	Jim McBride	Story by : Bob Brush & Todd W. Langen; Teleplay by : Todd W. Langen	February 27, 1990	B89516	30.3
When Kevin's music teacher Mr. Frace (William Lanteau) turns his class over to perky and optimistic student teacher Miss Haycock (Andrea Walters), the untalented, terrible-voiced eighth grade glee club rehearses "Stout-hearted Men" for the Spring Sing concert. But after Kevin and the rest of the class tells Miss Haycock they don't want to sing in the concert, she breaks down in tears; but classmate Warren Butcher (Jeffrey Baum), who up until that point never even talked, begins holding a note in perfect pitch, and sings with perfect vibrato when they rehearse the song again, with the rest of the boys singing better. Now the glee club has a secret weapon for the concert--until the night of the concert when Warren's 13-year-old voice starts to change shortly after the beginning of the song, causing a disaster including Paul sneezing out of control and Doug falling off the stage. The glee club then limps through the rest of the song; and when the song is over, a dejected Miss Haycock wanders offstage, never to be heard from again. Guest-starring: William Lanteau as Kevin's original music teacher Mr. Frace; Andrea Walters as student music teacher Miss Haycock; Dustin Diamond as Joey Lapman; Troy Slaten as Eric; Jeffrey Baum as Warren Butcher. Recurring guests: Brandon Crane as Doug Porter; Michael Tricario as Randy Mitchell. Absent: Dan Lauria as Jack Arnold; Alley Mills as Norma Arnold; Olivia d'Abo as Karen Arnold.
40	17	"Night Out"	Dan Lauria	Story by : Tammy Ader; Teleplay by : Todd W. Langen & Mark B. Perry	March 13, 1990	B89517	30.7
Since Kevin and Winnie are a couple once again, they get invited to a make-out party hosted by infamous ninth grader Robbie Hudson (Greg Davis). When Kevin goes to the Cooper house, he thinks he will be attacked, only for Mr. Cooper to receive Kevin warmly (under the impression Kevin and Winnie are going to a friendly social). When they get chosen to go into the make-out room, things get awkward for the young couple, especially when Winnie doesn't want to kiss Kevin, leaving him confused. Later that night, Winnie comes to Kevin's bedroom window while he's sleeping and asks him to go for a walk so she can explain herself. But Kevin thinks Winnie wants to be just friends again--until she calls him her boyfriend and kisses him on a bridge. Turns out that Winnie was only waiting for the perfect moment! Guest-starring: Greg Davis as Robbie Hudson. Recurring guests: Crystal McKellar as Becky Slater; Krista Murphy as Carla Healey; Sean Baca as Craig Hobson; H. Richard Greene as Mr. Cooper; Ben Stein as Mr. Cantwell. Absent: Dan Lauria as Jack Arnold; Olivia d'Abo as Karen Arnold.
41	18	"Faith" "Death & Taxes"	Michael Dinner	Story by : Bob Brush & Matthew Carlson; Teleplay by : Matthew Carlson	March 27, 1990	B89518	27.4
It's tax time, but Norma loses the tax receipts needed for filing, and the family awaits their impending doom when Jack finds out. But they learn that there are more tragic things happening in the world. The news broadcasts of the failed Apollo 13 space mission has everyone on edge. Norma leaves the house to run errands when Jack confronts her about filing taxes, and Kevin runs in to her at church praying. In a subplot, Mrs. Stebbins (Salmone Jens), Kevin's English teacher, gives his class an assignment to write an obituary of their lives for creative writing, but Kevin can't decide how his life will turn out in the future in order to write an acceptable obituary. The Arnold parents don't fight after all, Kevin briefly eavesdrops on them joking and reminiscing together. They recreate the receipts from Jack's memory of the family's finances over the year. It's revealed that Norma had actually gone to church to pray for the missing astronauts. Guest-starring: Emily Schulman as Susan Kelly; Josh Berman as Harold; Billie Joe Wright as Larry; Michael Bower as Joe; Salmone Jens as Kevin's English teacher Mrs. Stebbins. Absent: Danica McKellar as Winnie Cooper.
42	19	"The Unnatural"	Nick Marck	Ian Gurvitz	April 17, 1990	B89519	27.9
When Paul tries out for the Kennedy junior high Wildcats baseball team, Kevin gets the coach's attention when he instructs him at bat. Coach Ted Baker (Harrison Page) asks Kevin to come up to bat and he smashes a line drive to right field, impressing him so much he asks him to try out for the team. But Kevin wonders why he keeps making the cut even though his performance is bad and wants to know why. He finds out that Coach Baker is his father's old Marine Corps buddy in the Korean War, and Jack had in fact saved his life in battle. Jack starts going to Kevin's tryouts and talks with the coach, but when Kevin sees his name crossed off the cut list, he's relieved that he wasn't receiving favoritism after all. He hits one out of the park, pretending like he's Bobby Thomson of the New York Giants baseball team in the National League pennant game of 1951. Or as Kevin says: "Maybe that's not exactly how it happened, but that's how it should have happened. And that's how I like to remember it." Guest-starring: Harrison Page as Coach Ted Baker. Absent: Olivia d'Abo as Karen Arnold.
43	20	"Good-bye"	Michael Dinner	Bob Brush	April 24, 1990	B89520	24.4
When Kevin asks his beloved algebra teacher Mr. Collins how he is doing overall in math, he doesn't get the response he needed to hear back. Instead, Mr. Collins gives Kevin private tutoring to raise his grades of C's on quizzes into A's on tests. Mr. Collins then suddenly canceled a scheduled session several days before the mid-term exam. He also announced he'd be off the next few days off but would be back to give the exam or leave it at the end of the week, leaving Kevin to fend for himself. Kevin thought Mr. Collins was helping him because he believed in him, and feels betrayed. On the day of the exam, Collins does show up with the exam that Friday, so Kevin decides to get a "respectable F" and botch the answers on purpose, much to Mr. Collins' dismay. The following Monday, Kevin regrets what he's done, and goes to Mr. Collins to apologize, only for Mr. Diperna (Raye Birk) to inform Kevin that Mr. Collins died over the weekend from heart failure. It seemed the teacher knew his end was very near (he likely knew this for some time) and at home that weekend he "misplaced" his test before passing away. Mr. Diperna asks Kevin to stay after school, but only to do a fresh test, which Kevin applies himself to. It seems that Arthur Collins believed in Kevin Arnold after all, and Kevin hands it into Mr. Diperna confident that he scored an A. Recurring guests: Raye Birk as Mr. Diperna; Steven Gilborn in his final appearance as Mr. Collins. Absent: Alley Mills as Norma Arnold; Olivia d'Abo as Karen Arnold.
44	21	"Cocoa and Sympathy"	Peter Baldwin	Winnie Holzman	May 1, 1990	B89521	25.7
Lisa Berlini has made up a list of categories she thinks is the definitive rating of eighth grade boys--called the "Lisa Berlini Poll." Kevin is chosen for "best eyes," while Paul's self-esteem falls when he is named the "brainiest." The boys then decide to retaliate by making their own poll about the eighth grade girls; but when Paul makes the unlikely choice of Kevin's mom for "best smile," Kevin is embarrassed, especially when his friends all agree. Paul then develops a crush on Norma when she says he looks "manly" with glasses, but she handles it well. Paul and Norma then go to a chamber music concert together and when he gives her a rose, she lets him down easy saying he needs to find girls his age, but it should be easy considering how gentlemanly he was to her. Recurring guest: Sean Baca as Craig Hobson. Absent: Danica McKellar as Winnie Cooper. Note: Lisa Berlini (played by Kathy Wagner in Season 1) was only referred to in this episode but was never seen.
45	22	"Daddy's Little Girl"	Jim McBride	Todd W. Langen & Mark B. Perry	May 8, 1990	B89522	24.1
In another "Jack vs. Karen" episode, Karen's eighteenth birthday is approaching, and tension arises with Jack when she tells him that she wants to enroll in a liberal college. When he declines her decision about her future, she suggests taking a year off to go backpacking in Europe. In the end, Jack realizes that his little girl isn't so little anymore. Karen's leaving and won't be back next year, but Jack sends her off with one last gift--his military "kit bag" from the Marines, so she can use it for college or if she goes some place. Karen then blows out her birthday cake candles, makes a wish, and goes out for the night, with her father leaving the porch light on when she returns. Absent: Josh Saviano as Paul Pfeiffer.
46	23	"Moving"	Michael Dinner	Jill Gordon & Bob Brush	May 15, 1990	B89523	20.4
When Jack finds dry rot in the basement, he considers selling the house, sending Kevin in a panic. He tells Winnie and Paul that he's moving, but is surprised they take it well and are ready to have a long distance relationship. In the end, Jack realizes that he'll just settle for getting the basement fixed, but accidentally slips and tells Kevin that the Coopers are moving four miles across town. Kevin is now in shock and despair over this and confronts Winnie as to why she didn't tell him, especially that she's going to a different school next year. Thinking she'll stay if he buys Winnie a ring, Kevin gives it to her but she can't accept it and breaks up with him instead, making Kevin throw it in the trash. On moving day, Kevin decides to say goodbye to Winnie and finds her alone in the moving van with his ring in her hand and they have a long hug. Kevin then joins the family for Karen's high school graduation and the family celebrates at a local restaurant where Wayne is working as a waiter. Now Kevin has to travel far beyond his front door and out of his neighborhood to see Winnie; as the present-day Kevin says in voice-over, his world just got a little bigger.
