= The Wonder Years season 1 =

The Wonder Years
- Season 1
- DVD cover
- No. of episodes: 6

Release
- Original network: ABC
- Original release: January 31 – April 19, 1988

Season chronology
- Next → Season 2

The first season of The Wonder Years aired on ABC from January 31, 1988 to April 19, 1988.

== Episodes ==
No. overall	No. in season	Title	Directed by	Written by	Original release date	Prod. code	Rating/share (households)
1	1	"Pilot"	Steve Miner	Neal Marlens & Carol Black	January 31, 1988	B88003	17.9/31
Kevin Arnold (Fred Savage) and his friends Paul Pfeiffer (Josh Saviano) and Winnie Cooper (Danica McKellar) are enjoying the summer of 1968, before heading to the newly renamed Robert F. Kennedy Junior High School. The first day for Kevin is tough. One teacher remarks about his experience with Kevin's older brother Wayne (Jason Hervey) and assumes Kevin will be as much of a problem. Later at lunch, after being teased by Wayne and his friends over his anticipated relationship with Winnie, Kevin gets into trouble with Principal Diperna, who catches him leaving the cafeteria with an apple, against a school rule which states food must remain in the cafeteria. In defiance, Kevin subsequently hurls the apple back into the cafeteria. Norma (Alley Mills) and Jack (Dan Lauria) are called in for Diperna's disciplinary session with their son. Just as Kevin is about to face punishment from his parents, they hear tragic news upon returning home – Winnie's brother Brian was killed in action in the Vietnam War. Guest-starring: Bentley Mitchum as Winnie's older brother Brian Cooper, who scolds Wayne for bullying Kevin; Raye Birk in his first appearance as principal Mr. Diperna. Robert Picardo in his first appearance as Kevin's physical education teacher Coach Cutlip. Arye Gross provided the voice of adult Kevin Arnold during this episode's original post-Super Bowl XXII broadcast. The voiceover was re-recorded by Daniel Stern when he assumed the role for the remainder of the series. In 2009, TV Guide ranked this episode #39 on its list of the 100 Greatest Episodes.
2	2	"Swingers"	Neal Marlens & Carol Black	Neal Marlens & Carol Black	March 22, 1988	B88101	19.5/30
Brian Cooper's funeral is being held, and Kevin has two things on his mind; how this is the first funeral that he attended "that was not for an old person", and Winnie. Meanwhile, in the boys' physical education class at school, Coach Cutlip (Robert Picardo) begins the much-anticipated sex education. Becoming quickly bored over Cutlip's presentation, Kevin and Paul decide to learn about sex beyond the classroom, so at Wayne's suggestion, Kevin and Paul go to the local bookstore to purchase a copy of Everything You Always Wanted to Know About Sex (But Were Afraid to Ask). Later, when Wayne mocks Paul and Kevin about the book, it turns into a rumble. Norma breaks up the fight, telling the boys she does not mind the book, but wondering why they were snooping in her dresser drawers. When they are innocent of that accusation, Kevin realizes it is possible even his mother owns a copy as well. Guest-starring: Robert Picardo in his second appearance as Kevin's physical education teacher Coach Cutlip. Recurring guest: Bentley Mitchum in his final appearance as Brian Cooper's ghost in Kevin's imagination, giving Kevin friendly advice on being involved with Winnie.
3	3	"My Father's Office"	Jeffrey Brown	Neal Marlens & Carol Black	March 29, 1988	B88102	19.2/30
Kevin's father comes home from work, in a foul mood, most of the time. However, on the really bad days, Jack will seclude himself in the backyard, and look through his telescope. Kevin decides he wants to know what his father actually does at work, so Jack brings Kevin with him to NORCOM (Jack's employer), and Kevin learns more by spending the day in his father's office. While in the break room, Jack describes his original dreams of being captain of a ship, using the stars to navigate, but reality, and marriage set in, and Jack eventually ended up in the employment he currently has. After witnessing severe disciplinary action from Jack's boss over the incompetence of Jack's subordinates, Kevin realizes why his father returns home from work in a nasty mood most of the time, and why his father finds solace in looking through his telescope at night. Absent: Danica McKellar as Winnie Cooper. Note: In 1997 TV Guide ranked this episode number 29 on its "100 Greatest Episodes of All Time" list.
4	4	"Angel"	Art Wolff	Neal Marlens & Carol Black	April 5, 1988	B88103	17.1/28
Kevin's older sister Karen (Olivia d'Abo) has become a hippie who does not communicate with her parents anymore. The tension is worsened when she brings home her new boyfriend Louis (John Corbett), also a hippie who angers Jack with his anti-war sentiments. Kevin also takes an immediate dislike to Louis; in the end, Kevin's inclinations about Louis turn out to be true, as it is revealed that Louis has been cheating on Karen. Guest-starring: Wendel Meldrum in her first appearance as Kevin's English teacher Miss White (although uncredited).
5	5	"The Phone Call"	Jeffrey Brown	A. Scott Frank	April 12, 1988	B88104	17.7/28
Kevin is smitten with Lisa Berlini (Kathy Wagner), an attractive girl in his class. He decides he will call her at home, but he is nervous to do so. Meanwhile, Paul tries to find out if Lisa likes Kevin by consulting the junior high grapevine. After a day of cowering—he fakes an illness to cut school—Kevin tries again to call Lisa but waits until after dinner. To help give himself additional courage, Kevin asks Norma during dinner about the time Jack first called her. Later, after Jack scolds Wayne for teasing Kevin about wanting to call Lisa, Kevin finally works up the courage to break the ice. Lisa answers, and she and Kevin have a friendly chat as the episode fades out. In a subplot, the Arnolds gather around the TV to watch the crew of Apollo 8 transmit live pictures of the Earth from the Moon. Guest-starring: Kathy Wagner as Lisa Berlini.
6	6	"Dance with Me"	Arlene Sanford	David M. Stern	April 19, 1988	B88105	17.6/27
Kevin, by way of in-class note-passing, asks Lisa Berlini to the Fall Dance and she accepts. Soon after, when Brad Gaines (Mark-Paul Gosselaar) asks her, she decides to go with him instead. Kevin confronts her about this, and a guilt-stricken Lisa explains to him that she just wants to be friends. Dejected by Lisa's rejection, Kevin finds himself asking Winnie to the dance, but he finds out she is going with her new boyfriend Kirk McCray (Michael Landes). In retaliation, Kevin tries to make Winnie jealous at the dance by dancing with another girl, but Winnie does not seem fazed by it. Winnie finally feels sorry for Kevin and ends up dancing with him. Guest-starring: Michael Landes in his first appearance as Winnie's new boyfriend Kirk McCray; Krista Murphy in her first appearance as Paul's new girlfriend Carla Healey Recurring guest: Kathy Wagner in her final appearance as Lisa Berlini. She would only be referenced to in Episode 44, "Cocoa and Sympathy" ("The Lisa Berlini Poll").
