= 42nd Primetime Emmy Awards =

1990 American television programming awards

- Date: September 16, 1990 (Ceremony); September 15, 1990 (Creative Arts Awards)
- Location: Pasadena Civic Auditorium, Pasadena, California
- Presented by: Academy of Television Arts and Sciences
- Hosted by: Candice Bergen; Jay Leno; Jane Pauley

Highlights
- Most awards: L.A. Law (3)
- Most nominations: L.A. Law (11)
- Outstanding Comedy Series: Murphy Brown
- Outstanding Drama Series: L.A. Law
- Outstanding Miniseries: Drug Wars: The Camarena Story
- Outstanding Variety, Music or Comedy Series: In Living Color

Television/radio coverage
- Network: Fox

The 42nd Primetime Emmy Awards were held on Sunday, September 16, 1990. The ceremony was broadcast on Fox from the Pasadena Civic Auditorium in Pasadena, California, where 27 awards were presented. Two networks, The Family Channel and The Disney Channel, received their first major nominations.

For its second season, Murphy Brown won Outstanding Comedy Series and one other major award. Defending champion Cheers received the most major nominations for a comedy series with 9 and Newhart finished its series run with 21 major nominations, but not a single win. On the drama side, L.A. Law won Outstanding Drama Series for the third time in four years and also won three major awards, receiving the most major nominations for a drama series with 11. This became the first year that every cast member of The Golden Girls wasn't nominated for a Primetime Emmy Award.

This ceremony was remembered for the circumstance that three major categories resulted in ties, the most ever for one ceremony.

A clip of The Simpsons presenting the award for Outstanding Lead Actor in a Comedy Series can be seen on the DVD boxset of the second season as a special feature.

== Winners and nominees ==
=== Programs ===
Programs
Outstanding Comedy Series: Murphy Brown (CBS); Cheers (NBC); Designing Women (CBS); The Golden Girls (NBC); The Wonder Years (ABC)	Outstanding Drama Series: L.A. Law (NBC); China Beach (ABC); Quantum Leap (NBC); Thirtysomething (ABC); Twin Peaks (ABC)
Outstanding Variety, Music or Comedy Series: In Living Color (Fox); The Arsenio Hall Show (Syndicated); Late Night with David Letterman (NBC); Saturday Night Live (NBC); The Tracey Ullman Show (Fox)	Outstanding Variety, Music or Comedy Special: Sammy Davis Jr. 60th Anniversary Celebration (ABC); The 43rd Annual Tony Awards (CBS); The 62nd Annual Academy Awards (ABC); The Best of "The Tracey Ullman Show" (Fox); Billy Crystal: Midnight Train to Moscow (HBO)
Outstanding Drama/Comedy Special: Caroline? (CBS); The Incident (CBS); The Final Days (ABC); A Killing in a Small Town (CBS); Murder in Mississippi (NBC)	Outstanding Miniseries: Drug Wars: The Camarena Story (NBC); Blind Faith (NBC); Family of Spies (CBS); The Kennedys of Massachusetts (ABC); Small Sacrifices (ABC)

=== Acting ===
==== Lead performances ====
Acting
Outstanding Lead Actor in a Comedy Series: Ted Danson as Sam Malone in Cheers (NBC) (Episode: "Cry Harder"); John Goodman as Dan Conner in Roseanne (ABC) (Episode: "Born to Be Wild"); Richard Mulligan as Dr. Harry Weston in Empty Nest (NBC) (Episode: "Still Growing After All These Years"); Craig T. Nelson as Coach Hayden Fox in Coach (ABC) (Episode: "If Keith Jackson Calls, I'll Be At My Therapist's"); Fred Savage as Kevin Arnold in The Wonder Years (ABC) (Episode: "Good-bye")	Outstanding Lead Actress in a Comedy Series: Candice Bergen as Murphy Brown in Murphy Brown (CBS) (Episode: "Brown Like Me"); Kirstie Alley as Rebecca Howe in Cheers (NBC) (Episode: "The Improbable Dream, Part I"); Blair Brown as Molly Dodd in The Days and Nights of Molly Dodd (Lifetime); Delta Burke as Suzanne Sugarbaker in Designing Women (CBS) (Episode: "They Shoot Fat Women, Don't They?"); Betty White as Rose Nylund in The Golden Girls (NBC) (Episode: "Rose Fights Back")
Outstanding Lead Actor in a Drama Series: Peter Falk as Columbo in Columbo (ABC) (Episode: "Agenda for Murder"); Scott Bakula as Sam Beckett in Quantum Leap (NBC); Robert Loggia as Nick Mancuso in Mancuso, FBI (NBC); Kyle MacLachlan as Special Agent Dale Cooper in Twin Peaks (ABC); Edward Woodward as Robert McCall in The Equalizer (CBS)	Outstanding Lead Actress in a Drama Series: Patricia Wettig as Nancy Krieger Weston in Thirtysomething (ABC) (Episode: "The Other Shoe"); Dana Delany as Nurse Colleen McMurphy in China Beach (ABC); Jill Eikenberry as Ann Kelsey in L.A. Law (NBC); Angela Lansbury as Jessica Fletcher in Murder, She Wrote (CBS); Piper Laurie as Catherine Martell in Twin Peaks (ABC)
Outstanding Lead Actor in a Miniseries or a Special: Hume Cronyn as John Cooper in Age-Old Friends (HBO); Michael Caine as Dr. Henry Jekyll & Mr. Edward Hyde in Jekyll & Hyde (ABC); Art Carney as The Father in Where Pigeons Go to Die (NBC); Albert Finney as Jason Cromwell in The Image (HBO); Tom Hulce as Mickey Schwerner in Murder in Mississippi (NBC)	Outstanding Lead Actress in a Miniseries or a Special: Barbara Hershey as Candy Morrison in A Killing in a Small Town (CBS); Farrah Fawcett as Diane Downs in Small Sacrifices (ABC); Christine Lahti as Zan Cooper in No Place Like Home (CBS); Annette O'Toole as Rose Fitzgerald Kennedy in The Kennedys of Massachusetts (ABC); Lesley Ann Warren as Barbara Walker in Family of Spies (CBS); Alfre Woodard as Mary Thomas in A Mother's Courage: The Mary Thomas Story (NBC)

==== Supporting performances ====
Outstanding Supporting Actor in a Comedy Series: Alex Rocco as Al Floss in The Famous Teddy Z (CBS) (Episodes: "Pilot" + "Teddy Sells His House" + "Agent of the Year"); Kelsey Grammer as Dr. Frasier Crane in Cheers (NBC) (Episodes: "The Stork Brings a Crane" + "Severe Crane Damage" + "The Ghost and Mrs. Lebec"); Woody Harrelson as Woody Boyd in Cheers (NBC) (Episodes: "Woody or Won't He" + "50–50 Carla" + "Loverboyd"); Charles Kimbrough as Jim Dial in Murphy Brown (CBS) (Episodes: "Anchors Away" + "Roasted" + "On the Road Again"); Jerry Van Dyke as Luther Van Dam in Coach (ABC) (Episodes: "If a Coach Falls in the Woods" + "Coaches Conference" + "Homewreckers")	Outstanding Supporting Actress in a Comedy Series: Bebe Neuwirth as Lilith Crane in Cheers (NBC) (Episodes: "The Stork Brings a Crane" + "Severe Crane Damage" + "The Ghost and Mrs. Lebec"); Julia Duffy as Stephanie Vanderkellen in Newhart (CBS) (Episodes: "Cupcake in a Cage" + "Lights, Camera, Contractions!" + "Seein' Double"); Faith Ford as Corky Sherwood in Murphy Brown (CBS) (Episodes: "And the Whiner Is..." + "Bad Girls" + "Going to the Chapel"); Estelle Getty as Sophia Petrillo in The Golden Girls (NBC) (Episodes: "Sick and Tired" + "Not Another Monday" + "Clinton Avenue Memoirs"); Rhea Perlman as Carla Tortelli in Cheers (NBC) (Episodes: "Death Takes a Holiday on Ice" + "50–50 Carla" + "The Ghost and Mrs. Lebec")
Outstanding Supporting Actor in a Drama Series: Jimmy Smits as Victor Sifuentes in L.A. Law (NBC) (Episodes: "The Unsterile Cuckoo" + "Blood, Sweat and Fears"); Timothy Busfield as Elliot Weston in Thirtysomething (ABC); Larry Drake as Benny Stulwicz in L.A. Law (NBC); Richard Dysart as Leland McKenzie Jr. in L.A. Law (NBC); Dean Stockwell as Al Calavicci in Quantum Leap (NBC)	Outstanding Supporting Actress in a Drama Series: Marg Helgenberger as KC Kolowski in China Beach (ABC) (Episodes: "The Unquiet Earth" + "Skin Deep" + "Nightfall"); Sherilyn Fenn as Audrey Horne in Twin Peaks (ABC) (Episodes: "Pilot" + "Episode 2" + "Episode 6"); Melanie Mayron as Melissa Steadman in Thirtysomething (ABC) (Episodes: "Mr. Right" + "Strangers" + "Good Sex, Bad Sex, What Sex, No Sex"); Diana Muldaur as Rosalind Shays in L.A. Law (NBC) (Episodes: "The Pay's Lousy, But the Tips Are Great" + "Whatever Happened to Hannah?" + "Watts a Matter?"); Susan Ruttan as Roxanne Melman in L.A. Law (NBC) (Episodes: "The Good Human Bar" + "Bang... Zoom... Zap" + "Forgive Me Father, For I Have Sued")
Outstanding Supporting Actor in a Miniseries or a Special: Vincent Gardenia as Michael Aylott in Age-Old Friends (HBO); Ned Beatty as Cornelius van Horne in Last Train Home (Family Channel); Brian Dennehy as Ed Reivers in A Killing in a Small Town (CBS); Anthony Hopkins as Abel Magwitch in Great Expectations (Disney); James Earl Jones as Alice in By Dawn's Early Light (HBO); Max von Sydow as Szaz in Red King, White Knight (HBO)	Outstanding Supporting Actress in a Miniseries or a Special: Eva Marie Saint as Lil Van Degan Altemus in People Like Us (NBC); Stockard Channing as Liz Sapperstein in Perfect Witness (HBO); Colleen Dewhurst as Hepzibah in Lantern Hill (Disney); Swoosie Kurtz as Joanne Winstow-Darvish in The Image (HBO); Irene Worth as Dolly Keeling in The Shell Seekers (ABC)

==== Individual performances ====
Outstanding Individual Performance in a Variety or Music Program
- Tracey Ullman — The Best of "The Tracey Ullman Show" (Fox)
  - Dana Carvey — Saturday Night Live (NBC)
  - Billy Crystal — Billy Crystal: Midnight Train to Moscow (HBO)
  - Julie Kavner — The Tracey Ullman Show (Fox)
  - Angela Lansbury — The 43rd Annual Tony Awards (CBS)

=== Directing ===
Directing
Outstanding Directing in a Comedy Series: The Wonder Years (ABC): "Good-bye" — Michael Dinner; Cheers (NBC): "The Improbable Dream, Part I" — James Burrows; Designing Women (CBS): "They Shoot Fat Women, Don't They?" — Harry Thomason; The Famous Teddy Z (CBS): "Pilot" — Hugh Wilson; The Golden Girls (NBC): "Triple Play" — Terry Hughes; Murphy Brown (CBS): "Brown Like Me" — Barnet Kellman	Outstanding Directing in a Drama Series: Equal Justice (ABC): "Promises to Keep" — Thomas Carter; Thirtysomething (ABC): "The Go-Between" — Scott Winant; L.A. Law (NBC): "The Last Gasp" — Rick Wallace; L.A. Law (NBC): "Noah's Bark" — Win Phelps; Twin Peaks (ABC): "Pilot" — David Lynch
Outstanding Directing in a Variety or Music Program: The Kennedy Center Honors: A Celebration of the Performing Arts (CBS) — Dwight Hemion; The 62nd Annual Academy Awards (ABC) — Chuck Workman; Billy Crystal: Midnight Train to Moscow (HBO) — Paul Flaherty; The Jim Henson Hour (NBC): "The Song of the Cloud Forest" — Jim Henson; Sammy Davis Jr. 60th Anniversary Celebration (ABC) — Jeff Margolis	Outstanding Directing in a Miniseries or a Special: Caroline? (CBS) — Joseph Sargent; Do You Know the Muffin Man? (CBS) — Gilbert Cates; The Final Days (ABC) — Richard Pearce; The Kennedys of Massachusetts (ABC) — Lamont Johnson; A Killing in a Small Town (CBS) — Stephen Gyllenhaal

=== Writing ===
Writing
Outstanding Writing in a Comedy Series: The Wonder Years (ABC): "Good-bye" — Bob Brush; Cheers (NBC): "Death Takes a Holiday on Ice" — Ken Levine and David Isaacs; The Famous Teddy Z (CBS): "Pilot" — Hugh Wilson; Murphy Brown (CBS): "Brown Like Me" — Diane English; Newhart (CBS): "The Last Newhart" — Mark Egan, Mark Solomon and Bob Bendetson	Outstanding Writing in a Drama Series: L.A. Law (NBC): "Blood, Sweat and Fears" — David E. Kelley; L.A. Law (NBC): "Bang... Zoom... Zap" — David E. Kelley and William M. Finkelstein; Thirtysomething (ABC): "The Go-Between" — Joseph Dougherty; Twin Peaks (ABC): "Pilot" — Mark Frost and David Lynch; Twin Peaks (ABC): "Episode 3" — Harley Peyton
Outstanding Writing in a Variety or Music Program: Billy Crystal: Midnight Train to Moscow (HBO); The Tracey Ullman Show (Fox); In Living Color (Fox): "Pilot"; Late Night with David Letterman: "8th Anniversary Special" (NBC); Saturday Night Live (NBC)	Outstanding Writing in a Miniseries or a Special: Andre's Mother (PBS) — Terrence McNally; Caroline? (CBS) — Michael De Guzman; The Final Days (ABC) — Hugh Whitemore; The Incident (CBS) — Michael Norell and James Norell; The Kennedys of Massachusetts (ABC) — William Hanley

== Most major nominations ==
Networks with multiple major nominations (Note: "Major" constitutes the categories listed above: Program, Acting, Directing, and Writing. Does not include the technical categories.)
Network	Number of Nominations
NBC	47
ABC	47
CBS	35
HBO	11

Programs with multiple major nominations
Program	Category	Network	Number of Nominations
L.A. Law	Drama	NBC	11
Cheers	Comedy	NBC	9
Twin Peaks	Drama	ABC	7
Murphy Brown	Comedy	CBS	6
Thirtysomething	Drama	ABC	6
Billy Crystal: Midnight Train to Moscow	Variety	HBO	4
The Golden Girls	Comedy	NBC	4
The Kennedys of Massachusetts	Miniseries	ABC	4
A Killing in a Small Town	Special	CBS	4
The Wonder Years	Comedy	ABC	4
Caroline?	Special	CBS	3
China Beach	Drama	ABC	3
Designing Women	Comedy	CBS	3
The Famous Teddy Z	Comedy	CBS	3
The Final Days	Special	ABC	3
Quantum Leap	Drama	NBC	3
Saturday Night Live	Variety	NBC	3
The Tracey Ullman Show	Variety	Fox	3
The 43rd Annual Tony Awards	Variety	CBS	2
The 62nd Academy Awards	Variety	ABC	2
Age-Old Friends	Special	HBO	2
The Best of 'The Tracey Ullman Show'	Variety	Fox	2
Coach	Comedy	ABC	2
Family of Spies	Miniseries	CBS	2
The Image	Special	HBO	2
In Living Color	Variety	Fox	2
The Incident	Special	CBS	2
Murder in Mississippi	Special	NBC	2
Newhart	Comedy	CBS	2
Sammy Davis Jr. 60th Anniversary Celebration	Variety	ABC	2
Small Sacrifices	Miniseries	ABC	2

== Most major awards ==
Networks with multiple major awards
Network	Number of Awards
ABC	8
CBS	8
NBC	7
Fox	3
HBO	3

Programs with multiple major awards
Program	Category	Network	Number of Awards
L.A. Law	Drama	NBC	3
Age-Old Friends	Special	HBO	2
Caroline?	Special	CBS	2
Cheers	Comedy	NBC	2
Murphy Brown	Comedy	CBS	2
Thirtysomething	Drama	ABC	2
The Wonder Years	Comedy	ABC	2
