= Good-bye (The Wonder Years) =

- The Wonder Years episode
- Episode no.: Season 3 Episode 20
- Directed by: Michael Dinner
- Written by: Bob Brush
- Original air date: April 24, 1990

Guest appearances
- Steven Gilborn as Mr. Collins; Sean Baca as Craig Hobson; Raye Birk as Mr. Diperna

Episode chronology
← Previous "The Unnatural"	Next → "Cocoa and Sympathy"

"Good-bye" is the twentieth episode of the third season of The Wonder Years and the forty-third episode overall. Directed by Michael Dinner and written by Bob Brush, the episode aired on April 24, 1990 on the ABC network. The episode revolves around the relationship between Kevin Arnold and his math teacher, Mr. Collins, who pushes him to succeed in math. Kevin becomes antagonistic towards Mr. Collins, only to become regretful when tragedy befalls the teacher.

The episode was well received by the critical community at the time. It has been retrospectively considered a classic episode of the series. Brush won the Primetime Emmy Award for Outstanding Writing for a Comedy Series for his work on scripting this episode. Dinner won the Primetime Emmy Award for Outstanding Directing for a Comedy Series, becoming one of the few episodes to accomplish the directing/writing double.

== Plot ==
Kevin Arnold (Fred Savage) is averaging a "respectable" C in Mr. Collins' math class. Despite his best efforts, Kevin can only muster average 'C' grades. Kevin is mostly content with this, particularly after he does pull off a 'B' on a recent test, reasoning to himself that he is trying his best. However, Kevin becomes curious when he sees that Paul received a note from Mr. Collins on his math paper which read, "Good job, Paul." Kevin stops to talk with Mr. Collins regarding his progress in the class, expecting Collins to be impressed with his grades. When Mr. Collins doesn't reciprocate Kevin's enthusiasm for his grades, Kevin begins to wonder why. Kevin stops Mr. Collins in the courtyard and the teacher explains that he does not believe Kevin is achieving his potential in the class, and could achieve an 'A' on his upcoming midterm, if he really tried. Mr. Collins begins to personally tutor Kevin, and the two develop a unique bond in the class.

After many tutoring sessions in preparation for the midterm, one afternoon, Mr. Collins suddenly tells Kevin that he would not be able to help Kevin with his math for the rest of the week because he would be away, but would be back for the midterm at the end of the week. Kevin does not take this well, saying, "I thought you were my friend," to which Collins replies "Not your friend Mr. Arnold - your teacher". Mr. Collins, after being away a few days does show up for the midterm and Kevin, feeling betrayed, purposefully flunks the midterm examination, writing "who cares" and "???" in response to the questions, which disturbed Mr. Collins greatly. Kevin drops his test off and rushes out of the class, while Mr. Collins, looking over the paper with a clearly stricken expression on his face, calls out "Kevin!", (a notable deviation from his usual practice of addressing Kevin as "Mr. Arnold,") which Kevin ignores and continues walking. Although Kevin is proud of himself that evening, as the weekend progresses, Kevin regrets his decision to flunk the test.

On Monday, Kevin asks to see Mr. Collins in the teachers' lounge to apologize for his behavior. Mr. DiPerna surprises Kevin at the door and pulls him aside, explaining that Mr. Collins had died over the weekend from a heart condition, something he was suffering from for a long time. Mr. DiPerna apologizes for telling Kevin this news prior to a school-wide announcement, and informs Kevin that he will be taking over the class for now until a permanent replacement teacher could be found.

Kevin is distraught at this news, and sincerely regrets his decision to scorn Mr. Collins in such a way. Later, Kevin and Paul are eating lunch in the cafeteria when one of Kevin's friends pokes fun at Kevin and Paul over a score that Paul received on a math quiz in an advanced math class, which was taught by a female teacher. Kevin flicks Jell-O on the friend but is caught by Mr. DiPerna, who asks to see Kevin after school.

After school, Mr. DiPerna shows Kevin an envelope that contains all the midterm math exams. Mr. Collins had graded them all before he passed, but Mr. DiPerna informs Kevin that Mr. Collins had "lost" Kevin's exam. and asks if Kevin has any ideas what to do about it. Kevin says he doesn't have any ideas, to which Mr. DiPerna responds, "Well, Collins did," and reveals a blank test paper that Collins wrote 'Kevin Arnold' at the top of it, and gives him 55 minutes to complete. Kevin realizes that Mr. Collins had intended to give him a second chance to prove himself, and sees this as his opportunity to make amends with him. Kevin proceeds to thoroughly apply himself on the exam, and when he hands it in, he confidently tells Mr. DiPerna, "You don't have to grade it, it's an A." As Kevin leaves the classroom, he looks back at Mr. Collins' old desk, and sees a vision of his late former teacher in the chair with a look of approval on his face, and says out loud, "Good job, Mr. Collins." The camera dims as Kevin walks out of the building and a black and white photo of Mr. Collins in the yearbook with the words 'IN MEMORIAM Arthur A. Collins 1919-1970' are shown as the closing music plays.

== Production ==
Showrunner and writer Bob Brush said, "When we first came up with the idea of doing the math teacher, there was the premise of a three part arc from the beginning that I wanted to do. I loved the episode, because I thought the whole arc was very poignantly about becoming a man and accepting the keys and responsibility to manhood from the teacher and the master. It was really a rite of manhood, so it was a personal story."

Brush also praised the performances of Fred Savage and Steven Gilborn, saying, "I was as pleased as I'll ever get with that episode. It certainly meant a lot for me. It had to do with a lot of parts of my own life. The thing that I was probably proudest of about the episode was that in the long run, it was not specifically a weeper, which I never wanted it to be. I thought there was a strength in it. I thought at the end of the episode, where Kevin Arnold walks down the hallway, there was a manliness to him, which I had wanted to accomplish. I wanted an episode where he accepted being a man." Director Michael Dinner said the episode dealt with death, but was about "growing up and realizing his own failings."

== Reception ==
=== Critical reception ===
The Los Angeles Times named it the fifth greatest comedy episode about death.

=== Accolades ===
Michael Dinner won the Primetime Emmy Award for Outstanding Directing for a Comedy Series and Bob Brush won the Primetime Emmy Award for Outstanding Writing for a Comedy Series at the 42nd Primetime Emmy Awards. The episode also earned Brush a Humanitas Prize at the 17th annual awards in the category of 30 Minute Network or Syndicated Television and a nomination for the Writers Guild of America Award for Best Screenplay - Episodic Comedy at the 1990 Writers Guild of America Awards. The episode also earned an Emmy nomination in the category of Outstanding Editing for a Series - Single Camera Production for Michael Vejar and an American Cinema Editors Eddie Award nomination in the category of Best Edited Episode from a Television Series for Dennis C. Vejar. Fred Savage was nominated for his second consecutive Primetime Emmy Award for Outstanding Lead Actor in a Comedy Series for this episode.
