= Neal Marlens =

American television producer and writer

- Born: November 8, 1956 (age 69); Long Island City, New York City, New York
- Occupations: Television producer and writer
- Years active: 1983–2006
- Spouse: Carol Black

Neal Marlens (born November 8, 1956) is an American television producer and writer. He is known for work on the television series Growing Pains, The Wonder Years and Ellen, all with his wife, fellow television producer/writer Carol Black.

== Early life ==
Neal Marlens is one of two sons, with brother Steve, of Al and Hanna Marlens, respectively a Newsday managing editor and later an editor at The New York Times, and a Long Island school psychologist born in Vienna, Austria, in 1928 and who escaped The Holocaust by moving first to Cuba and then New York City, and who died in 2008. Neal Marlens was raised in the Audubon Woods section of West Hills, New York, and graduated from Stimson Junior High and Walt Whitman High School, both in nearby Huntington Station, New York. Neal attended Swarthmore College in the late 1970s, where he competed successfully on the men's tennis team. He added good humor and a friendly personality to a campus that sometimes lacked both.

== Awards ==
Marlens won a 1988 Primetime Emmy Award for Outstanding Comedy Series for The Wonder Years, as well as an additional nomination in that category for 1989, and for comedy-series writing in 1988.
