= Carol Black (writer) =

American writer and filmmaker

- Born: c. 1957 or 1958 (age 67–68)
- Education: Swarthmore College
- Occupations: Writer and filmmaker
- Years active: 1983–present
- Spouse: Neal Marlens
- Children: 2
- Website: carolblack.org

Carol Black (born c. 1957/1958) is an American writer and filmmaker. She is known as the creator and writer-producer of the television series The Wonder Years and Ellen, both with her husband and writing partner Neal Marlens. Black and Marlens received the 1988 Emmy Award for Outstanding Comedy Series for The Wonder Years and the 1989 Writers Guild of America award after the first six-episode season had aired.

Outside of her television career, Black is known for writing the screenplay for the controversial comedy film Soul Man, which depicts a white student donning blackface in order to attend Harvard on an affirmative action scholarship.

Black studied education and literature at Swarthmore College and UCLA, and after the birth of her children, left her career in the entertainment industry to become involved in the unschooling and alternative education movement and later to make independent nonprofit films.

In 2010, she directed the documentary film Schooling the World: The fellow White Man’s Last Burden about the impacts of institutional schooling on small-scale land-based societies. Schooling the World premiered at the Vancouver International Film Festival, and features Wade Davis, Helena Norberg-Hodge, Vandana Shiva, Manish Jain, and Dolma Tsering. She also co-directed with Marlens the 2005 mockumentary The Lost People of Mountain Village, about excessive real estate development in the Rocky Mountains, which premiered at Mountainfilm in Telluride.
