= Raye Birk =

American film and television actor

- Born: May 27, 1943 (age 83); Flint, Michigan, U.S.
- Occupation: Actor
- Years active: 1970–present
- Known for: Pahpshmir the Naked Gun film series

Raye Birk (born May 27, 1943) is an American film and television actor. He appeared as Pahpshmir in the first and third installments of the Naked Gun films, and his television appearances include The Wonder Years, The Golden Girls, Wings, and Cheers, where he portrayed the mailman Walt Twitchell.

== Career ==
Birk appeared as a villain in The Naked Gun: From the Files of Police Squad! (1988) and Naked Gun 33 1/3: The Final Insult (1994). His other film credits include roles in Best Defense (1984), Amazon Women on the Moon (1987), Throw Momma from the Train (1987), Doc Hollywood (1991) and Star Trek: Insurrection (1998).

In addition to these roles, he had a frequently occurring role as the assistant principal Mr. Diperna on The Wonder Years; starting with the pilot episode, when he had a conference with Kevin Arnold's parents for throwing food in the cafeteria. (He originally read for the role of Coach Ed Cutlip).

Furthermore, in 1985, 1986 and 1992, he appeared in three episodes of Cheers as Walt Twitchell, a mailman who got into minor altercations with Cliff Clavin. Birk reprised the role of Twitchell in a 2002 episode of the Cheers spinoff series, Frasier, in which the title character (played by Kelsey Grammer) returned to Boston and re-acquainted himself with old friends from the bar. He also appeared three times on ALF, once as Lenny Scott and twice as Officer Griswald. Raye appeared in several episodes on the TV series Night Court. He was also on a pair of The Golden Girls episodes, both times playing a wedding caterer. He played a recurring role on Coach as university band director Riley Pringle from 1989 to 1993. He also appeared in an episode of Mr. Belvedere as an accordion player.

Birk has also guest starred in Due South as the terrorist Francis Bolt in the Episodes "All the Queens Horses", "Red, White and Blue", "Call of the Wild Part One" and "Call of the Wild Part Two". He also had roles in Wings, The X-Files and Babylon 5. He was also on an episode of Home Improvement as one of Tim's poker buddies. His other appearances include Seinfeld, Touched by an Angel, ER, and the soap opera Days of Our Lives.

From 2004 to 2008, he played Ebenezer Scrooge in A Christmas Carol at the Guthrie Theater in Minneapolis.

== Filmography ==
=== Film ===
Year	Title	Role	Notes
1970	Gas-s-s-s	Mort Catafalque	
1984	Best Defense	Sonny, Dynatechnics	
1984	The Adventures of Buckaroo Banzai Across the 8th Dimension	Reporter	
1987	Burglar	The Jogger	
1987	Amazon Women on the Moon	Vanya	
1987	Throw Momma from the Train	Pinsky	
1987	Jake's M.O.	Det. Bushkin	
1988	The Naked Gun: From the Files of Police Squad!	Pahpshmir	
1989	Martians Go Home	Speaker on TV	
1991	Doc Hollywood	Simon Tidwell	
1992	Class Act	Principal Kratz	
1993	Josh and S.A.M.	Hotel Manager	
1994	Naked Gun 33 1/3: The Final Insult	Pahpshmir	
1995	Illegal in Blue	Gary Dedmarch	
1996	The Big Squeeze	Contractor	
1998	Star Trek: Insurrection	Son'a Doctor	
2005	Factotum	Heathercliff	
2005	North Country	Tom Motel Clerk	
2005	Sweet Land	Postal Clerk	
2009	A Serious Man	Dr. Shapiro	

=== Television ===
Year	Title	Role	Notes
1976	The Taming of the Shrew	Gremio	Television film
1976	Hawaii Five-O	Parole Officer	Episode: "Target - A Cop"
1981	A Christmas Carol	Marley's Ghost	Television film
1983, 1984	Remington Steele	Cecil Cosgrove / Maitre d'	2 episodes
1984	Hill Street Blues	Singer	Episode: "The End of Logan's Run"
1984	Blue Thunder	Martin C. Sharp	Episode: "Clipped Wings"
1984	Mister Roberts	Dowdy	Television film
1984	Earthlings	Vince Martoni	Television film
1984	Mickey Spillane's Mike Hammer	Harry Stark	Episode: "Torch Song"
1984, 1989	Newhart	Dean Dackman / Whitley McVeigh	2 episodes
1985	Deadly Messages	Harding	Television film
1985	Off the Rack	Crimmins	Episode: "Here Comes the Bribe"
1985	Stir Crazy	Caterer Herbert	Episode: "Where's Mary"
1985, 1986	The Twilight Zone	Bearded Man / Time-Traveller	2 episodes
1985, 1988	Mr. Belvedere	Mr. Grant / Earl	2 episodes
1985–1991	Night Court	Frank Pepitone / Ward / God No. 1	5 episodes
1985–1992	Cheers	Walt Twitchell	3 episodes
1986	Mary	Waiter	Episode: "Table for Two"
1986	Fresno	Mr. Loats	4 episodes
1987	The Stepford Children	George Larson	Television film
1987	The Popcorn Kid	Leonard Brown	6 episodes
1987	Throb	John	Episode: "Moving In"
1987	Hunter	Lt. Fifer	Episode: "City of Passion: Part 1"
1987	Amen	Mr. Evans	Episode: "Thelma's Reunion"
1987	Star Trek: The Next Generation	Wrenn	Episode: "Haven"
1987–1988	ALF	Officer Griswald / Lenny Scott	3 episodes
1987, 1989	Duet	Dr. Dellerton / Vladimir Horowitz	2 episodes
1988	Marblehead Manor	Hansel	Episode: "Tea for Tuba"
1988	Beauty and the Beast	Edmonton	Episode: "Fever"
1988	Eisenhower and Lutz	Bjorn	Episode: "Blast from the Past"
1988	My Sister Sam	Dave Carmichael	Episode: "Good Neighbor Sam"
1988, 1989	The Golden Girls	Caterer	2 episodes
1988–1991	The Wonder Years	Mr. Diperna	10 episodes
1988, 1993	Empty Nest	Judge Talmadge / Albert	2 episodes
1988–1993	L.A. Law	Judge Steven Lang	7 episodes
1989	Perry Mason: The Case of the Lethal Lesson	Sam Morgan	Television film
1989	Matlock	Simon Le Simple	Episode: "The Clown"
1989	Snoops	Mr. Nelson	Episode: "A Pretty Girl Is Like a Malady"
1989–1993	Coach	Riley Pringle	5 episodes
1990	Challenger	Joseph Kilminster	Television film
1990	Archie: To Riverdale and Back Again	Judge Brown	Television film
1990	Perfect Strangers	McNulty	Episode: "Safe at Home"
1990–1992	Dear John	Dr. Hendricks	4 episodes
1990, 1995	Murphy Brown	Judge Quinn / Barney	2 episodes
1991	Aftermath: A Test of Love	Dr. Frenzel	Television film
1991	True Colors	Mr. Warner	Episode: "A Matter of Principal"
1991	Morton & Hayes	Butler / Reginald	2 episodes
1991	Under Cover	Grimbach	13 episodes
1992	Home Improvement	Fred	Episode: "Luck Be a Taylor Tonight"
1992	Sisters	Carlton Brunell	Episode: "Empty Rooms"
1992	Picket Fences	Mike Caton	Episode: "Pilot"
1992, 1993	Nurses	Chaplain / Mr. Eckworth	2 episodes
1993	Life Goes On	Dr. Bryant	Episode: "Bedfellows"
1993	Barbarians at the Gate	Travis Gaines	Television film
1993	Shaky Ground	Derek	Episode: "Toupee or Not Toupee"
1993	Caught in the Act	Sterling	Television film
1993–1995	Silk Stalkings	Atticus Dunn / Earl Elliott	7 episodes
1994	The George Carlin Show	Inspector Driscoll	Episode: "George Speaks His Mind"
1994	The Adventures of Brisco County, Jr.	Prosecuting Attorney	Episode: "High Treason: Part 1"
1994	Saved by the Bell: The New Class	Superintendent Stoneman	Episode: "Belding's Prank"
1995	M.A.N.T.I.S.	Mayor	Episode: "Fast Forward"
1995	My Brother's Keeper	Dr. Roth	Television film
1995	Seinfeld	Mr. Pless	Episode: "The Face Painter"
1995	Nowhere Man	Tobe Adler	Episode: "The Enemy Within"
1996	The X-Files	Dr. Jeff Eckerle	Episode: "War of the Coprophages"
1996	Wings	Prince Restivon	Episode: "A Tale of Two Sister Cities"
1996	Due South	Francis Bolt	Episode: "Red, White or Blue"
1996	After Jimmy	John Davies	Television film
1996	ER	Mr. Hartley	Episode: "Let the Games Begin"
1997	3rd Rock from the Sun	Jeweler	Episode: "A Dick on One Knee"
1997	Caroline in the City	Danny	Episode: "Caroline and the Critics"
1997	Baywatch	William Lanning	Episode: "Trial By Fire"
1997	Columbo	Howard Seltzer	Episode: "A Trace of Murder"
1997	Babylon 5	William	Episode: "Intersections in Real Time"
1997	Ned and Stacey	Earl	Episode: "I Like Your Moxie"
1998	Mike Hammer, Private Eye	Gustav Granville-Dawes	Episode: "The Art of Murder"
1999–2003	Days of Our Lives	Various roles	6 episodes
2000	Touched by an Angel	Mr. McFarlane	Episode: "Monica's Bad Day"
2001	Black Scorpion	Dr. Phineas Phoenix	6 episodes
2002	My Sister's Keeper	Justice of the Peace	Television film
2002	Frasier	Walt Twitchell	Episode: "Cheerful Goodbyes"
