= Bob Brush =

American television producer and writer

Robert Brush is an American writer-producer and composer, best known for his work as executive producer, writer and show runner of ABC's The Wonder Years. For The Wonder Years he received an Emmy for individual writing, the Peabody Award, and multiple Humanitas Awards. He was an executive producer and regular writer of the CBS series Early Edition (1996–2000).

== Career ==
Brush began his career as a musical composer following his graduation from Yale, where he was Pitchpipe of the Yale Whiffenpoofs. In the 1970s he worked at Sesame Street and Captain Kangaroo, writing scripts and composing songs, among them the Good Morning Captain theme song. In 1981 he composed the score for the Broadway musical The First, about baseball immortal Jackie Robinson, which ran for 70 performances at the Martin Beck Theatre. In 1986 he teamed with writer/producer Jay Tarses on The Days and Nights of Molly Dodd, starring Blair Brown, and The Slap Maxwell Story with Dabney Coleman. Beginning in 1988 he executive-produced and wrote The Wonder Years for its run of over 100 episodes, and followed with Early Edition, starring Kyle Chandler. His final work in Los Angeles was a 2012 television film, Scruples.

In 2022, Brush published a novel, The Piazza: Stories from Piazza Santa Caterina Piccola.

== Personal life ==
As of 2017, Brush lives in Manhattan and Hudson, New York with his wife, actress and writer Mel Harris. Brush has four children, two with Harris.

== Writer ==
- The Facts of Life (1985)
- Growing Pains (1986)
- Duet (1987)
- The Slap Maxwell Story (1987)
- The Days and Nights of Molly Dodd (10 episodes, 1987–1989)
- The Wonder Years (1988–1993)
- Square One Television (1992)
- Raising Caines (1995)
- Early Edition (1996–1998)
- Ed (1 episode, 2000)
- Karen Sisco (2 episodes, 2003)
- 111 Gramercy Park (2003)

== Producer ==
- The Days and Nights of Molly Dodd (1987–1989) (supervising producer)
- The Wonder Years (seasons 2–6, 1989–1993) (executive producer)
- Raising Caines (1995) (executive producer)
- Early Edition (1996–2000) (executive producer, developer, executive consultant)
- Ed (1 episode, 2000) (consulting producer)
- 111 Gramercy Park (2003) (executive producer)
- Karen Sisco (1 episode, 2004) (executive producer)
