= The Wonder Years =

American comedy-drama television series (1988–1993)

- Genre: Comedy; Slice of life; Coming of age; Comedy-drama
- Created by: Neal Marlens; Carol Black
- Starring: Fred Savage; Dan Lauria; Alley Mills; Olivia d'Abo; Jason Hervey; Danica McKellar; Josh Saviano
- Narrated by: Daniel Stern
- Theme music composer: Lennon–McCartney
- Opening theme: "With a Little Help from My Friends" by Joe Cocker
- Country of origin: United States
- Original language: English
- No. of seasons: 6
- No. of episodes: 115 (list of episodes)

Production
- Executive producers: Bob Brush; Michael Dinner; Carol Black; Neal Marlens
- Producers: Joey Calderon; Ken Topolsky; Michael Dinner; Bruce J. Nachbar; David Chambers
- Camera setup: Single-camera
- Running time: 22–24 minutes
- Production companies: The Black/Marlens Company; New World Television

Original release
- Network: ABC
- Release: January 31, 1988 – May 12, 1993

Related
- The Wonder Years (2021–2023)

The Wonder Years is an American coming-of-age comedy-drama television series created by Neal Marlens and Carol Black. The series premiered on ABC on January 31, 1988, immediately after the network's broadcast of Super Bowl XXII, and ended on May 12, 1993. The series stars Fred Savage as Kevin Arnold, a teenager growing up in a suburban middle-class family in the late 1960s and early 1970s. It co-stars Dan Lauria as his father Jack, Alley Mills as his mother Norma, Jason Hervey as his brother Wayne, Olivia d'Abo as his sister Karen, Josh Saviano as his best friend Paul Pfeiffer, and Danica McKellar as his girlfriend Winnie Cooper, with narration by Daniel Stern as an adult version of Kevin.

The show earned a spot in the Nielsen Top 30 during its first four seasons. TV Guide named it one of the 20 best shows of the 1980s. After six episodes, The Wonder Years won a Primetime Emmy Award for Outstanding Comedy Series at the 40th Primetime Emmy Awards in 1988. In addition, at age 13, Fred Savage became the youngest actor ever nominated as Outstanding Lead Actor for a Comedy Series at the 41st Primetime Emmy Awards. The show was also awarded a Peabody Award in 1989 for "pushing the boundaries of the sitcom format and using new modes of storytelling". In total, the series won 22 awards and was nominated for 54 more. In 1997, "My Father's Office" was ranked number 29 on TV Guide's 100 Greatest Episodes of All Time, and in the 2009 revised list, the pilot episode was ranked number 43. In 2016, Rolling Stone ranked The Wonder Years number 63 on its list of 100 Greatest TV Shows of All Time. In 2017, James Charisma of Paste ranked the show's opening sequence number 14 on a list of the 75 Best TV Title Sequences of All Time. As of recent years, many critics and fans consider The Wonder Years to be a classic with tremendous impact on the industry over the years, inspiring many other shows and how they are structured.

== Plot ==
The series depicts the social and family life of a boy in a typical American suburban middle-class family from 1968 to 1973, covering the ages of 12 through 17. Where the Arnold family lives is never specified other than being a suburb, but some episodes have license plates showing California and New York. Each year in the series takes place exactly 20 years before airing (1988 to 1993).

The show's plot centers on Kevin Arnold, the son of Jack and Norma Arnold. Kevin's father Jack holds a management job at NORCOM, a defense contractor, while his mother Norma is a housewife. Kevin also has an older brother, Wayne, and an older sister, Karen. Two of Kevin's friends and neighbors are prominently featured throughout the series: his best friend, Paul Pfeiffer, and his crush-turned-girlfriend Gwendolyn "Winnie" Cooper. Storylines are told through Kevin's reflections as an adult in his mid-30s, voiced by Daniel Stern.

In the pilot episode, Winnie's older brother Brian, whom Kevin admires, is killed in action in Vietnam in 1968. Kevin meets Winnie in a nearby wooded area called Harpers Woods, and they share what is implied to be each other's first kiss. This unsaid relationship between Winnie and Kevin remains dormant for a long while, with Winnie starting to date a popular eighth-grader named Kirk McCray and Kevin briefly going steady with Becky Slater. After Kevin breaks up with Becky due to his feelings for Winnie, Becky becomes a recurring nuisance for Kevin. Winnie eventually dumps Kirk as well and Kevin and Winnie share a second kiss at the start of the 1969 summer vacation. Around Valentine's Day 1970, Winnie temporarily dates Paul, who has broken up with his girlfriend Carla. Winnie and Kevin start dating each other soon after.

Just before the summer break, Winnie and her family move to a house four miles away. Although Winnie attends a new school, Lincoln Junior High, she and Kevin decide to remain together and maintain a successful long-distance relationship. A beautiful new student named Madeline Adams joins Kevin's school and quickly catches Kevin's eye, but it is Winnie who breaks up with Kevin after meeting Roger, a jock at her new school. Neither relationship lasts long, but Winnie and Kevin don't reunite until she is injured in a car crash. After graduating from junior high, Kevin and Winnie both go to McKinley High and Paul attends a prep school. Paul would later transfer to McKinley High and join Kevin and Winnie.

Earlier seasons of the show tended to focus on plots involving events within the Arnold household and Kevin's academic struggles, whereas later seasons focused much more on plots involving dating and Kevin's friends.

Kevin has several brief flings during the summer of 1971 and the 1971–1972 academic year. After Kevin's grandfather Albert gets his driver's license revoked, he sells his car to Kevin for a dollar. Paul transfers to McKinley High after his first semester at preparatory school when his father Alvin runs into financial troubles. Wayne decides to join the army as a result of his inability to do well in school. This gets turned around when Wayne is not able to pass his physical. Winnie and Kevin are reunited when they go on a double date to a school dance, and find themselves more attracted to each other than their respective partners. In late 1972, Wayne starts working at NORCOM, and dates his co-worker Bonnie Douglas, a divorcée with a son named David, but the relationship does not last. Jack quits NORCOM, and buys a furniture-manufacturing business.

=== Final episode and epilogue ===
Shortly before the finale, mirroring the women's liberation movement of the 1970s, in 1973, Norma, not wanting to let her college degree go to waste, gets a job as a comptroller at Micro Electronics, making $225/week. Meanwhile, Kevin and his friends get their SAT scores, with Kevin scoring a respectable 650 verbal/590 math, while Winnie scores a near-perfect 725 verbal/757 math. As a result, Kevin and Jack start feeling inadequate, but then beat Winnie and Norma in a game of bowling and reconcile.

In the series finale, Winnie decides to take a job for the summer of 1973 as a lifeguard at a resort. Kevin, meanwhile, is at his job at Jack's furniture factory and calls Winnie, who is distant and seems to be enjoying her time away from Kevin. Eventually, Kevin and Jack fight and Kevin announces that he is leaving, reasoning that he needs to "find himself". Kevin drives to the resort where Winnie is working, hopeful that she can secure him a job and they can spend the rest of the summer together.

Kevin eventually secures a job at the resort and plays a round of poker with the house band. He wins big and goes out to search for Winnie to tell her of his good fortune. To his surprise, he sees Winnie engaged in a passionate kiss with Eric, another lifeguard.

The next day, Kevin confronts her and they fight. Kevin then plays another round of poker, losing his car in a bet. Desperate, Kevin confronts Winnie and her new boyfriend Eric at the restaurant and ends up punching Eric in the face. Kevin then leaves the resort on foot.

On a desolate stretch of highway, Kevin decides to begin hitchhiking. He finally gets picked up by an elderly couple and much to his surprise finds Winnie in the backseat. Winnie was fired over the fight Kevin instigated at the resort. Kevin and Winnie begin to argue and the elderly couple lose patience and kick them out of the car. A rainstorm begins and Kevin and Winnie search for shelter. They find a barn and discuss how much things are changing and the future. They make up and kiss passionately; it is strongly implied that they have sex, which would be the first time for both.

The narrator's monologue states:

Once upon a time, there was a girl I knew who lived across the street. Brown hair. Brown eyes. When she smiled, I smiled. When she cried, I cried. Every single thing that ever happened to me that mattered, in some way, had to do with her. That day, Winnie and I promised each other that, no matter what, we would always be together. It was a promise full of passion, truth, and wisdom. It was the kind of promise that can only come from the hearts of the very young.

They soon find their way back to their hometown and arrive hand-in-hand to a Fourth of July parade. During this parade, the adult Kevin (Daniel Stern) describes the fate of the show's main characters. Kevin makes up with Jack, graduates from high school in 1974, and leaves for college, later becoming a writer. Paul studies law at Harvard. Karen, Kevin's sister, has a baby in September 1973. Norma becomes a businesswoman and corporate board chairwoman. Jack dies in 1975 and Wayne takes over Jack's furniture business. Winnie studies art history in Paris while Kevin stays in the United States. Winnie and Kevin end up writing to each other once a week for the next eight years. When Winnie returns to the United States in 1982, Kevin meets her at the airport, with his wife and eight-month-old son.

The final sounds, voice-over narration, and dialogue of the episode and series is that of Kevin as an adult, with children heard in the background:

Growing up happens in a heartbeat. One day you're in diapers, the next day you're gone. But the memories of childhood stay with you for the long haul. I remember a place, a town, a house like a lot of houses. A yard like a lot of other yards. On a street like a lot of other streets. And the thing is, after all these years, I still look back ... with wonder.

A little boy—Stern's real life son, Henry—can be heard asking "Hey, Dad, want to play catch?" during a break in the final narration. Kevin responds, "I'll be right there."

In 2011, the finale was ranked number 11 on the TV Guide Network special, TV's Most Unforgettable Finales.

== Episodes ==
| Season | Episodes | Originally released | | Rank | Rating |
| Season | Episodes | First released | Last released | Rank | Rating |
|---|---|---|---|---|---|
| 1 | 6 | January 31, 1988 | April 19, 1988 | 10 | 18.8 (Note: Tied with ALF) |
| 2 | 17 | November 30, 1988 | May 16, 1989 | 22 | 16.3 (Note: Tied with The Hogan Family and The NBC Sunday Night Movie) |
| 3 | 23 | October 3, 1989 | May 16, 1990 | 8 | 19.2 |
| 4 | 23 | September 19, 1990 | May 15, 1991 | 30 | 14.2 |
| 5 | 24 | October 2, 1991 | May 13, 1992 | 32 | 12.9 |
| 6 | 22 | September 23, 1992 | May 12, 1993 | 54 | 10.3 |

== Cast ==
Paul, Kevin, and Winnie

- Kevin Arnold (Fred Savage): Character born March 18, 1956, Kevin grew up in the turbulent late 1960s and early 1970s. The voice of Kevin as an adult (and the show's narrator) is supplied by Daniel Stern (Arye Gross in the original broadcast of the pilot).
- John "Jack" Arnold (Dan Lauria): Character born on November 6, 1927, died in 1975. Jack was a gruff, laconic man and a Korean War veteran; he grew up during the Great Depression, served in the US Marine Corps, and is seen in photographs wearing the uniform of a First Lieutenant. He works at NORCOM, a large military defense corporation, in a middle management position he loathes. Later, he starts his own business, building and selling handcrafted furniture. The series' last episode reveals that he dies in 1975 near the end of Kevin's freshman year of college – that is, two years after the time of the show's finale – although in a previous episode, an adult Kevin says Jack would later be the grandfather of Kevin's sons. Jack represents the viewpoint of the "Silent Generation" that grew up during the Depression and came of age during the Second World War; it was confused and angered by the rapid changes taking place in the 1960s. He is described as a Republican who voted for Richard Nixon twice in the presidential elections of 1968 and 1972.
- Norma Arnold (née Gustavson) (Alley Mills): Character born March 22, 1930, Kevin's housewife mother. Unlike her husband, Norma is friendly and upbeat. She also tries to be a peacekeeper in family clashes (mostly between Jack and Karen). She met Jack as a college freshman. When he graduated, she moved across the country with him and did not finish college. She eventually gets her degree late in the series and begins work at a software startup called Micro Electronics. Although she came of age at the same time as her husband Jack, she is less conservative than her husband and increasingly yearns to break out of her homemaker role, reflecting the rise of feminism in the 1960s.
- Karen Arnold (Olivia d'Abo): Character born circa 1952, Kevin's hippie, but mature older sister. Her free-spirited ways clash with her overbearing father Jack's conservatism, and she depends upon her mother Norma as a mediator. When Karen moves in with her boyfriend Michael (David Schwimmer) during her freshman year of college, she has a falling out with her father. The pair marry one year later and move to Alaska, where Michael has secured a good job. Karen ultimately accepts some of her parents' viewpoints and has a baby, while Michael learns to support Karen and their son.
- Wayne Arnold (Jason Hervey): Character born April 6, 1954, Kevin's annoying older brother. Wayne enjoys physically tormenting Kevin and Paul, calling Kevin "butthead" or "scrote". He ultimately takes over the family furniture business, after his father Jack dies. (Wayne attempted to follow in Jack's footsteps by joining the military, but psoriasis kept him out.) Wayne is usually portrayed as a loser in romantic relationships. For a time, he dated a girl named Dolores (Juliette Lewis), but that was more casual than serious. In later seasons, Wayne matures. In the final season, he begins a serious relationship with a divorcée named Bonnie Douglas (Paula Marshall), but is left heartbroken when she reconciles with her ex-husband James.
- Paul Joshua Pfeiffer (Josh Saviano): Character born March 14, 1956, Paul is Kevin's long time best friend, a bright and excellent student, and an allergy sufferer. He is also Jewish and in one episode celebrates his Bar Mitzvah. Although Kevin and Paul are best friends in the series' early seasons, their relationship becomes somewhat strained later. Kevin begins to spend more time with Chuck Coleman (Andy Berman) and Jeff Billings (Giovanni Ribisi), causing tension with Paul. Paul also attends a private prep school for one season, leaving Kevin alone to start public high school. In another episode, Kevin is frustrated and conflicted with Paul after the latter loses his virginity before him. In the final episode, it is revealed that Paul eventually attends Harvard and becomes a lawyer (in real life, Saviano quit acting, went to Yale, and became a lawyer).
- Gwendolyn "Winnie" Cooper (Danica McKellar): Winnie is Kevin's main love interest and neighbor. Her older brother Brian (Bentley Mitchum)'s death in the Vietnam War plays a big part in the pilot. In another episode, Winnie's parents Jim (H. Richard Greene) and Evelyn (first played by Lynn Milgrim and then Anne Cooper) separate in grief over Brian's death. In the epilogue of the final episode, Winnie travels overseas to study art history in Paris. Kevin and Winnie write to each other every week for eight years until she returns; in the concluding moments of the finale, Kevin says that when Winnie returned to the States, Kevin met her accompanied by his wife and first child, despite the hope among Wonder Years fans that Kevin and Winnie would themselves marry. Kevin says at the end, "things never turn out exactly the way you plan them." As suggested in an episode entitled "The Accident" and in the final episode of the series, every important event in Kevin's life has somehow involved Winnie.

== Production ==
=== Conception ===
The series was conceived by writers Neal Marlens and Carol Black, both of Growing Pains fame. They set out to create a family show that would appeal to the baby-boomer generation by setting the series in the late '60s, a time of radical change in America's history. They also wanted the series to tie this setting in to the life of a normal boy growing up during the period. After writing the script for the pilot episode, Marlens and Black began pitching the series to television networks. None of them were interested, except for ABC, with whom Marlens and Black reached an agreement.

Marlens had originally wanted the setting to be Huntington, Long Island, where he grew up. Elements were also taken from Black's childhood from the White Oak section of Silver Spring, Maryland. ABC, however, insisted that the location remain nonspecific (the colloquial "Anytown, USA"), but several items refer to the setting as Southern California, from car license plates, to the lack of snow and winter weather, to Jack working for a major defense contractor (many located in Southern California at the time), to Wayne's driver's license listing Culver City, California.

=== Writing ===
When they started writing the series, Marlens and Black took a script for a future film with which they had been toying, which featured an off-screen narrator. Black explained, "We liked the concept that you could play with what people think and what they're saying, or how they would like to see themselves as opposed to how the audience is seeing them." They based the show, in part, on their own childhood growing up in the suburbs. Black recalled that "we naturally [took] elements of our experience and [threw] them into the pot. The basic setup, the neighborhood, the era – that's the time and place where we grew up." The show's title was a satirical nod to a famous 1970s Wonder Bread ad campaign promoting white bread as perfect for "The Wonder Years", ages 1 through 12.

=== Casting ===
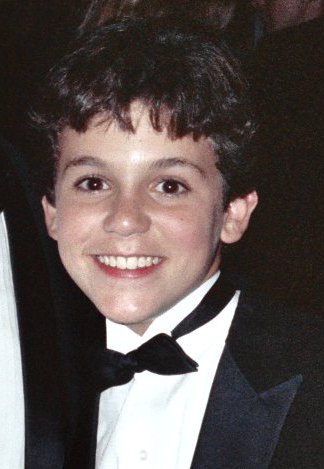
Fred Savage in 1990

The search for the main lead of the show did not take long. Marlens and Black went to five casting directors and interviewed them for recommendations. All five of them recommended Fred Savage, who at the time was famous for his roles as the grandson in The Princess Bride and as Charlie Seymour/Marshall Seymour in Vice Versa. Marlens and Black, having never heard of Savage, decided to see the rough cut of Vice Versa. Said Marlens, "[We saw] a marvelous actor with a natural quality – which essentially means he has no quality at all except being a kid. It sounds funny, but it's a rare thing to find in a child actor." Marlens and Black took this approach when casting the other kids for the show, looking for natural ability rather than professionalism. According to Marlens, they saw 300 to 400 kids before narrowing it down to 70. "My wife and I made the final choice ... each of whom had to be approved by the network."

For the choice of Savage's character's main love interest, the choice came down to actress Danica McKellar and her sister, Crystal McKellar. With just days to go before shooting, the producers eventually selected Danica to play Winnie Cooper. However, Mary Buck, the head of casting, noted, "it was practically a tossup". Crystal McKellar was liked so much by the producers that they eventually created the character of Becky Slater so that they could have her on the show. Danica later reflected on the experience, "I auditioned, like everyone else. They had read lots of girls but hadn't found their 'Winnie' yet, and I was thrilled to be chosen."

=== Filming ===
At the end of the first season, Marlens and Black departed from the show. Although they never gave a reason for their sudden departure, it may have been due to Black's pregnancy. She hinted at it in an interview in April 1988, saying "We have secret plans to leave Los Angeles before our kids reach the age of cognizance." One challenge for the cast and crew was filming around a child actor, meaning that the show had to obey child labor laws. Savage at the time explained, "You have to get at least three hours of school in every day. So whenever I'm on a break, I go to school. It's really intense because I have to get a lot done in short periods. And it's hard because if they need you back on the set, they pull you away every 20 minutes. If you're writing an essay and suddenly get inspired, you've got to stop and go back to work." Many exterior shots were filmed in Burbank, California.

=== Title sequence ===
Three different versions of the opening were made, each set to the Joe Cocker rendition of "With a Little Help from My Friends".

==== First version (pilot) ====
This first version of the opening was very basic: Nothing but a black screen was shown, after the title logo, with each cast member's name appearing in the center one by one. Much like the Arye Gross narration, this version of the opening was only used once when the pilot first aired after Super Bowl XXII.

==== Second version (seasons one through five) ====
This opening consists of home-movie footage from the pilot, after the title logo is shown, ending with the "created by" credit. In season five, more footage is added to show how much the cast has aged.

==== Third version (season six) ====
The opening was overhauled completely in this version. It consisted of stock footage and images of various moments throughout 1960s and early 1970s culture (i.e. John Lennon and Yoko Ono's Bed-in, the Kent State shootings, the Moon Landing, and an antiwar protest), and was set to a new edit of Cocker's rendition of the song (starting with the chorus, versus the opening of the song, as was the case in seasons one through five). The final image in this version is of Kevin, Paul, Winnie, and presumably some of their classmates in a group photograph edited to look like it belonged in the time period.

=== Music ===
The official soundtrack released in 1988 by Atlantic/WEA contains a total of 13 tracks, featuring Joe Cocker's cover of The Beatles' "With a Little Help from My Friends", which is the show's theme song.

After the series' original run was over, Laserlight Digital released a five-disc compilation box set under the title Music from The Wonder Years in 1994. This same company later released the first two DVDs for the series, The Best of The Wonder Years and The Christmas Wonder Years. The disc included 40 oldies favorites and five original songs (each is repeated twice in the set) written exclusively for the series by W. G. Snuffy Walden.

In 2014, Time Life released a new soundtrack for the show that accompanies deluxe versions of its complete series DVD set. The CD is not available for purchase separately from the DVD box set, however.

==== DVD music replacements ====
The Time Life DVD releases feature around 96% of the original music soundtrack, including Joe Cocker's cover of "With a Little Help From My Friends" at the opening. Fourteen songs were replaced, in most instances featuring generic studio replacement music in place of the original song, while on a few occasions, the original soundtrack song was replaced with another version of the same song. None of the necessary music replacements resulted in footage from the episodes being removed.

- In the episode "The Phone Call", the "Love Theme from Romeo and Juliet" was replaced with a song called "Star Crossed Lovers", which has been used in many other TV shows and movies, including The Brady Bunch.
- In "Dance With Me", Joe Cocker's cover of "The Letter" was replaced with the original version by The Box Tops, while the Herman's Hermits version of "There's a Kind of Hush" was replaced with a rerecording by the Craggy Blue Project.
- The episode "Heart of Darkness" had two replacements: "Riders on the Storm" by The Doors was replaced with "Children of the Night", while Richie Havens' cover of The Beatles' "Here Comes the Sun" was replaced by "Train to Nowhere".
- In the episode "Whose Woods Are These?", the Blood, Sweat & Tears recording entitled "Variations on a Theme" by Erik Satie (1st and 2nd Movements, adapted from Satie's "Three Gymnopédies") was replaced with "Le Suenne Fite".
- The episode "How I Am Spending My Summer Vacation" replaced the Doors' "Light My Fire" with "Love's on Fire", while the episode "Summer Song" replaced Blood, Sweat and Tears' "Spinning Wheel" with a rerecording by former BS&T frontman David Clayton Thomas.
- In "Family Car", The Stills-Young Band's "Long May You Run" was replaced with "Keep Your Motor Running".
- In "Wayne on Wheels", "Love Theme from Romeo and Juliet" was again replaced by "Star Crossed Lovers".
- In the episode "The Treehouse", Doris Day's "Que Sera, Sera (Whatever Will Be, Will Be)" was replaced with "Call the Whole Thing Off".
- In the episode "Little Debbie", "Tammy" by Liberace was replaced with a song called "Sammy".
- "Clip Show" contains the scene from "Heart of Darkness" in which "Here Comes the Sun" is replaced with "Train to Nowhere".
- The episode "Kevin Delivers" dropped Blood, Sweat and Tears' "You've Made Me So Very Happy" with a re-recording by David Clayton Thomas.
- In the episode "Alice in Autoland", Al Green's "Let's Stay Together" was replaced with a re-recording by him.
- In the final episode "Independence Day", the Ennio Morricone song "Brothers" from the 1986 motion picture The Mission, which was played over the pivotal barn scene featuring Kevin and Winnie's last kiss, was replaced with the generic tune "Pastorale" (for this instance alone, the same replacement was used in the 1998 The Best of The Wonder Years DVD release).

Also, not a music change per se, but the Daniel Stern redub of the pilot is used, with the standard opening sequence.

Other than the above music changes, all other music is intact.

The UK DVD release from Fabulous Films was intended to have no replaced music, but reviews on online retailers and fan websites show that this is not the case.

=== Cancellation ===
The Wonder Years wrapped its sixth and final season in May 1993. Its cancellation was partially blamed on conflict between producers and executives at ABC. As Kevin matured, the producers wanted the storylines to mature, as well. The executives at ABC, though, felt uncomfortable with more explicit content given the time slot, saying, "We felt it was inappropriate to present Kevin's awakening because of the setting in the 1970s, the gentle tone of the series, and most importantly, the 8 pm time period." Bob Brush noted, "When Kevin became 16 and 17, there were really things he needed to get to that we couldn't do at 8 pm, especially with the kind of venerable cachet that the show had obtained with its audience. We would get notes from the network saying, "You could do this on any show besides The Wonder Years." Other reasons for the show's cancellation were escalating costs and declining ratings. The cast's salary increases, coupled with location shooting (which was due to the producers wanting to reflect Kevin obtaining his driver's license), led to Brush claiming that they were spending $1.2 million an episode. The final episode aired on May 12, 1993. Bob Brush noted that the finale was not what he would have wanted it to be, but because the cast and crew were unsure at the time of filming if the sixth season would be the last, he was forced to have the ending be open-ended until the recording of Daniel Stern's narration. Fans were somewhat disappointed with the ending, in particular the revelation that Kevin and Winnie do not end up as a couple. Brush acknowledged this disappointment, saying, "Some viewers [were] surprised that nothing works out the way your fondest wish would be," and explained, "The message I wanted in there is that that's part of the beauty of life. It's fine to say, 'I'd like everything to be just the way it was when I was 15 and I was happy,' but it seemed more nurturing to me to say that we leave these things behind and we go on to forge new lives for ourselves."

==== Lawsuit ====
As the show was in the process of wrapping its final season, a costume designer on the show named Monique Long filed a sexual harassment charge against stars Fred Savage and Jason Hervey. The suit brought forward unwanted publicity to the show. In the end, the case was settled out of court with Savage stating that he was "completely exonerated" and adding that it was a "terrible experience".

In January 2018, Alley Mills said that a sexual harassment lawsuit against Savage and Hervey was a significant factor in the show's cancellation.

== Release ==
=== Syndication and streaming ===
Reruns of the show aired in syndication between September 1992 and September 1997. Nick at Nite then reran the show from October 13, 1997 to January 21, 2001. It also reran on The New TNN (January 22, 2001 to September 28, 2001), ABC Family (November 12, 2001 to October 2, 2004), Ion Television (April 2, 2007 to October 4, 2007), and The Hub (October 11, 2010 to August 31, 2012).

In the UK, the show began airing on Channel 4 on August 20, 1989.

In (West) Germany, the show began airing on RTL plus on February 28, 1990 as Wunderbare Jahre. Seasons 1-4 were shown on RTL plus until February 1, 1992 on Saturdays at 6:00 pm. Reruns were shown on RTL 2 between September 6 and October 25, 1993 and December 17–31, 1994. On July 17, 1995, the show began airing again on RTL 2 on weekdays until the end of the year; this time, between October 20 and December 29, 1995, previously unaired Seasons 5 and 6 were shown.

In Canada, the show aired on CTS Ontario from September 2010 until September 2, 2011. In Australia, the show aired on Network Ten between 1989 and 1995, then from March 31, 2012, on ABC1. In the Philippines, the show aired on GMA Network.

In Spain, the series initially aired Mondays 9:30 pm on TVE2 (now La2) as part of the Monday-night comedy block, which also featured Murphy Brown. The series was later promoted to main channel TVE1, where it aired Fridays 9:00 pm. Years later, in the late '90s, commercial station Antena 3TV recovered the series and aired it first in its 2:00 pm comedy hour, later relocating it to a 5:30 pm slot as part of the youth macroshow La Merienda.

=== Home media ===
Initially, the first four episodes were released on two VHS cassettes by Anchor Bay in 1997, with most of the music intact (a select few songs, however, were re-recordings). In the coming years, fees for licensing music prevented further episodes from being released on VHS. The two volumes that were released on VHS were later released on DVD in 2000. Four episodes of the series were also included in two official "best-of" DVD sets (The Best of The Wonder Years and The Christmas Wonder Years), without much of the original music.

For many years, full seasons of The Wonder Years remained unreleased on DVD due to music licensing issues. Because of this issue, The Wonder Years routinely appeared on the list of TV shows in high demand for a DVD release.

In a blog update on the Netflix website on March 30, 2011, and a press release issued the next day, Netflix stated that they would be adding The Wonder Years to their instant streaming service. The other three 20th Century Fox series noted as part of the deal were added to the Watch Instantly service by April 2, 2011 while The Wonder Years remained unavailable. On October 1, 2011, 114 full-length episodes of the series were added to Netflix. The clip show from the end of Season 4, which was released on DVD, was not included.

On September 26, 2011, Amazon Prime's streaming video service announced it would be adding The Wonder Years, describing the series as "available on digital video for the first time", although Netflix added the series ahead of Amazon's release. All 115 episodes (including the clip show) became available to Prime members starting October 6, 2011.

On both digital streaming services, portions of the soundtrack have been replaced. The show's opening theme has been replaced on Netflix and Amazon with the version of the song that played in the UK and other overseas airings. The majority of the show's soundtrack remains unchanged. Songs such as "Light My Fire" by The Doors and "Foxy Lady" by Jimi Hendrix have been replaced by generic sound-alikes with different lyrics.

On February 11, 2014, StarVista/Time Life announced the upcoming DVD release of the complete series in the second half of the year, noting that it was "painstakingly securing the rights for virtually every song." On June 11, packaging details for complete set were revealed. The packaging consists of a miniature school locker featuring a replica yearbook with signatures from cast members, behind-the-scenes photos, and classic show memorabilia. Also included are two notebooks similar to those carried by the two lead characters, each featuring detailed episode information, production photos, all 115 episodes, and over 15 hours of bonus features on 26 DVDs. Customized Wonder Years magnets are also included. On September 30, 2014, the complete series was released to those who ordered the set through mail order from Time Life/Star Vista. A box set for the first four seasons was also released. October 10, 2014, though, was considered the official release date.

On October 7, 2014, Star Vista released season one on DVD in Region 1 for the first time. Season two was released on February 3, 2015. Season three was released on May 26, 2015. Season four was released on January 12, 2016. Season five was released on May 24, 2016. Season six was released on September 27, 2016.

On October 6, 2015, Star Vista released The Wonder Years- The Complete Series: Collectors Box Set and The Wonder Years- The Complete Series DVD collections in a wide general retail release.

On May 9, 2016, Fabulous Films released The Wonder Years - The Deluxe Edition on 26 DVDs in the UK. It was intended to be the first release to contain every episode in its original transmission presentation, although in the end this did not happen. The set includes over 23 hours of bonus material.

| DVD Name | Ep # | Release dates | | | DVD Special Features |
| DVD Name | Ep # | Region 1 | Region 2 | Region 4 | DVD Special Features |
|---|---|---|---|---|---|
| Season one | 6 | October 7, 2014 | N/A | June 8, 2016 | Highlights from The Wonder Years cast reunion, May 28, 2014; Featurette: With a Little Help from My Friends: The Early Days of The Wonder Years; Interviews with: Creators Neal Marlens and Carol Black; Fred Savage; Danica McKellar; Josh Saviano |
| Season two | 17 | February 3, 2015 | N/A | June 8, 2016 | Interview with Fred Savage (Part 1); Interview with Danica McKellar (Part 1); Highlights from The Wonder Years cast reunion; Interview with The Wonder Years creators Neal Marlins and Carol Black |
| Season three | 23 | May 26, 2015 | N/A | June 8, 2016 | Cast interviews; Hall Pass: Roundtable with Danica McKellar, Fred Savage, and Josh Saviano; A Family Affair: At Home with the Arnolds |
| Season four | 23 | January 12, 2016 | N/A | June 8, 2016 | Teachers That [sic] Made a Difference; Cast interviews |
| Season five | 24 | May 24, 2016 | N/A | June 8, 2016 | That's a Wrap!: Mark B. Perry's Farewell Set Tour Season 5; Will You Love Me Tomorrow: The Wonder Years Love Stories; Cast interviews |
| Season six | 22 | September 27, 2016 | N/A | June 8, 2016 | One-hour ABC broadcast of the series finale; At Last: The Final Episode; Interview with Bob Brush, executive producer; From the Vault: Alley Mills and Bob Brush Letters |
| The Complete Series | 115 | September 30, 2014 | N/A | April 20, 2016 | Two notebooks, each featuring detailed episode information and production photos. Replica yearbook embellished with signatures from cast members, behind-the-scenes photos, classic show memorabilia, and liner notes penned by Fred Savage, series creators Neal Marlens and Carol Black, and executive producer Bob Brush A 2014 Los Angeles cast reunion, featuring all key cast together for the first time in 16 years Extensive individual interviews with all seven key cast members (Fred Savage, Danica McKellar, Josh Saviano, Dan Lauria, Alley Mills, Olivia d'Abo, and Jason Hervey), as well as with notable actors featured as guest stars or in recurring roles, such as David Schwimmer, Ben Stein, Bob Picardo and Seth Green In-depth interviews with narrator Daniel Stern, Neal Marlens, Carol Black, Bob Brush, and other production personnel Ten new featurettes: "With a Little Help From My Friends": The Early Days of The Wonder Years, "The Times They Are A-Changin'": The Era, "My Generation": The Kids Grow Up, "When a Man Loves a Woman": Kevin & Winnie Forever, "Bookends": Kevin & Paul, "A Family Affair": At Home with the Arnolds, "I Love You for Sentimental Reasons": Fan-Favorite Episodes, "Will You Love Me Tomorrow": The Wonder Years Love Stories, "ABC": Teachers That Made a Difference, "Both Sides Now": The Music That Made the Moments. "That's a Wrap! Mark B. Perry's Farewell Set Tour Season 5" - Writer/Producer Mark B. Perry's home video set tour from the end of his final season on the show, which includes new commentary from him. "From the Vault: Alley Mills and Bob Brush Letters" - Alley Mills reads her emotional, written conversation with executive producer Bob Brush about the show's finale. The one-hour finale as it was originally aired on ABC on May 12, 1993, including a deleted scene not included in the half-hour broadcasts of the final two episodes (both the one-hour finale and half-hour versions of the final two episodes will be included in the extras). |

== Critical reception ==
On Rotten Tomatoes, the series has an approval rating of 100% with an average rating of 10.00/10 based on 9 reviews. On Metacritic, the series has a score of 82 out of 100, based on 9 reviews, indicating "universal acclaim".

In 1997, "My Father's Office" was ranked number 29 on TV Guide's 100 Greatest Episodes of All Time, and in the 2009 revised list, the pilot episode was ranked number 43. In 2016, Rolling Stone ranked The Wonder Years number 63 on its list of 100 Greatest TV Shows of All Time. In 2017, James Charisma of Paste ranked the show's opening sequence number 14 on a list of the 75 Best TV Title Sequences of All Time. As of recent years, many critics and fans consider The Wonder Years to be a classic with tremendous impact on the industry over the years, inspiring many other shows and how they are structured.

== Book ==
In 1990, the book The Wonder Years - Growing Up in the Sixties by Edward Gross was published by Pioneer Books (ISBN 1-55698-258-5). It contains information about the creation and production of the show, interviews with cast and crew, and an extensive episode guide (up to the middle of the 4th season when the book was published). While long out of print and hard to find, the author gave permission to a fan website to publish the book online for free in its entirety.

== Remake ==
In Colombia, the production company BE-TV made a version for Caracol Televisión also titled Los años maravillosos (The Wonder Years), set in the 1980s and with a Colombian cast. The series was a critical failure.

== Reboot ==
On July 8, 2020, ABC announced that they were rebooting the series with film director, producer, and screenwriter Lee Daniels, longtime television writer and producer Saladin Patterson, and original series star Fred Savage as executive producers. Savage would also direct the pilot episode, and original series co-creator Neal Marlens will be a consultant on the project. The new series would once again take place in the late 1960s—but this time, it would focus on the life of a black middle-class family living in Montgomery, Alabama. In March 2021, it was announced that Don Cheadle would serve as the series narrator. In May 2021, ABC officially picked up the series. The series premiered on September 22, 2021.

A connection between the two series was established when in the Season 1 episode "Love & War" aired April 13, 2022, Bruce Williams (Spence Moore II) reveals that while he was serving in the Vietnam War, his life was saved by Brian Cooper, Winnie's brother, who died trying to save others.
