= Moment of Truth: Cradle of Conspiracy =

- Promotional advertisement
- Written by: Jayne Martin
- Directed by: Gabrielle Beaumont
- Starring: Dee Wallace; Danica McKellar; Jamie Luner
- Music by: Mark Snow
- Country of origin: United States
- Original language: English

Production
- Executive producers: Lawrence Horowitz; Michael O'Hara
- Producer: Ooty Moorehead
- Cinematography: Brian West
- Editor: Mervin B. Dayan
- Running time: 96 minutes
- Production company: O'Hara-Horowitz Productions

Original release
- Network: NBC
- Release: May 2, 1994

Moment of Truth: Cradle of Conspiracy is a 1994 American made-for-television drama film directed by Gabrielle Beaumont. The film is a part of the Moment of Truth franchise and premiered on NBC on May 2, 1994. Filming took place in Los Angeles.

== Plot ==
Kristin Guthrie is a teenager growing up in an upper-class environment. She has trouble living up to her mother Suzanne's ideals and she starts to rebel by dating Kenny, a young man of whom her parents become immediately suspicious. Fearful of losing their daughter, they allow her to see him, until their nightmare comes true: Kristin runs away with Kenny. It soon turns out that Kenny is working in the black market, illegally selling babies he fathers with other girls. He also impregnates Kristin, planning to sell their baby after its birth as well. Meanwhile, her parents are desperately searching for their daughter.

== Cast ==
- Dee Wallace as Suzanne Guthrie
- Danica McKellar as Kristin Guthrie
- Kurt Deutsch as Kenny Trask
- Carmen Argenziano as Jack Guthrie
- Geoffrey Thorne as Gary Pritchard
- Merle Kennedy as Janine
- Ellen Crawford as Lorna Gill
- Shannon Fill as Pami
- Jamie Luner as Donna
- Burke Byrnes as Detective Otis
