= Justice for Annie: A Moment of Truth Movie =

- Genre: Drama; Thriller
- Written by: Joyce Heft Brotman
- Directed by: Noel Nosseck
- Starring: Peggy Lipton; Danica McKellar
- Music by: Stacy Widelitz
- Countries of origin: United States; Canada
- Original language: English

Production
- Executive producers: Lawrence Horowitz; Michael O'Hara
- Producer: Tracey Jeffrey
- Production location: British Columbia
- Cinematography: Richard Leiterman
- Editor: Ron Spang
- Running time: 90 minutes
- Production companies: Libra Pictures; O'Hara-Horowitz Productions

Original release
- Network: NBC
- Release: January 15, 1996

Justice for Annie: A Moment of Truth Movie is a 1996 American-Canadian made-for-television drama film directed by Noel Nosseck. The film, based on actual events, is a part of the Moment of Truth franchise and was also made as Death Benefit (1996). Filming took place in Toronto.

== Plot ==
Carol Mills (Peggy Lipton) is a mother who has a troubled relationship with her 19-year-old daughter Annie (Danica McKellar). Unable to live with her any longer, Annie moves out and marries her boyfriend Ken Carman (Martin Cummins). It soon turns out their marriage is a failure, and she decides to move in with another family, George and Helen Preston (Terry David Mulligan, Susan Ruttan). Not much later, Carol receives a message, informing her that her daughter accidentally died. Crushed, she learns at the funeral that Annie had a life insurance policy worth $100,000, with Helen as beneficiary. She suspects that Annie was murdered for the money and attempts to collect evidence to prove it, with the help of a detective (Bruce Weitz).

The film was based on the case of Deana Hubbard Wild, who was pushed to her death from a cliff near Monterey, California. Wild's boyfriend's mother was convicted of her murder in 1992. His father was also charged, but died before the case was brought to trial.

== Cast ==
- Peggy Lipton as Carol Mills
- Danica McKellar as Annie Mills Carman
- Terry David Mulligan as George Preston
- Gwynyth Walsh as Lydia Sawyer
- Teryl Rothery as Laura Kane
- Lochlyn Munro as Mickey Holloway
- Martin Cummins as Ken Carman
- Bruce Weitz as Detective McAdams
- Susan Ruttan as Helen Preston
