= Danica McKellar =

American actress, mathematics writer, and education advocate (born 1975)

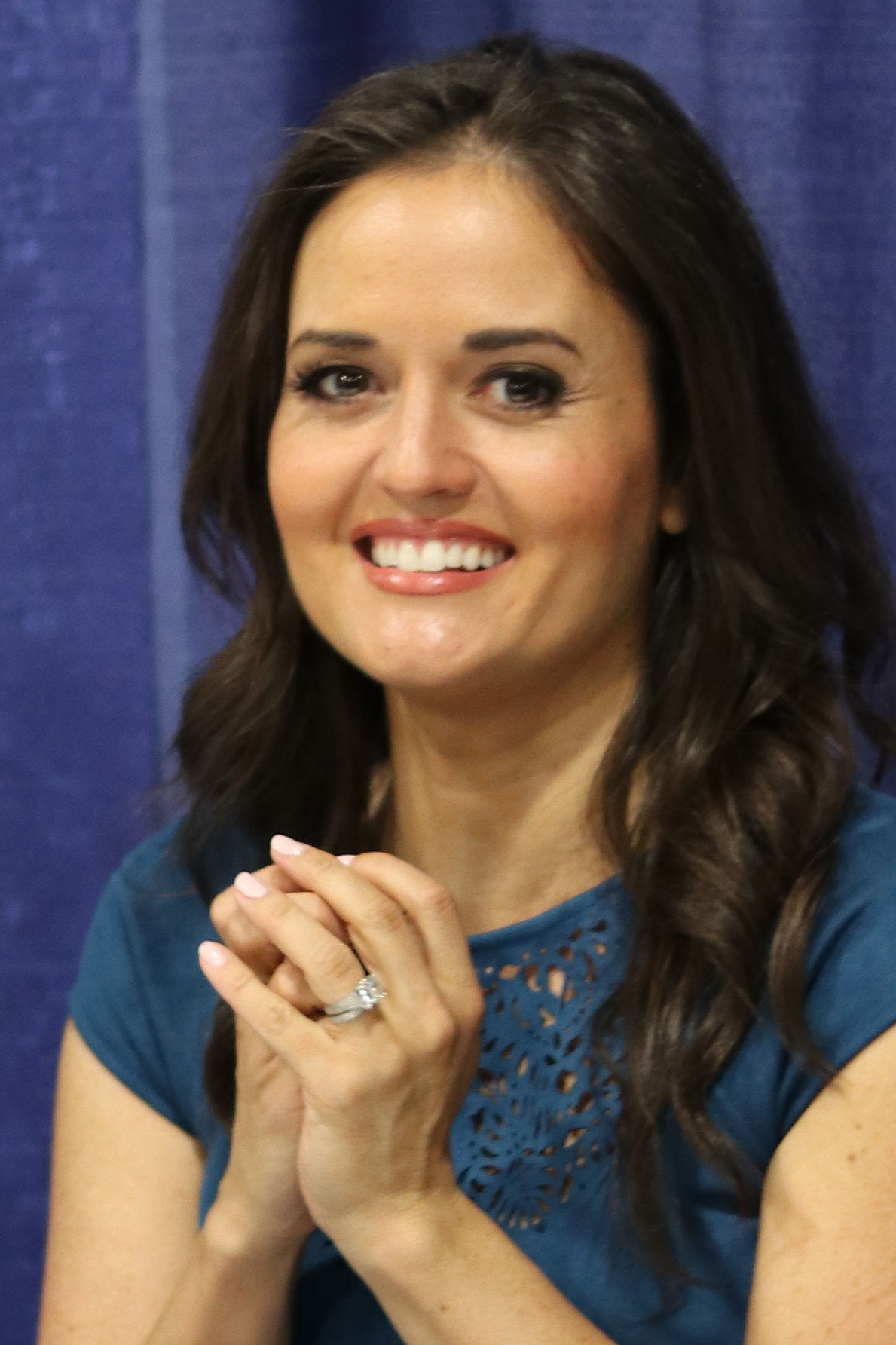
- McKellar at the 2018 National Book Festival
- Born: January 3, 1975 (age 51); La Jolla, California, U.S.
- Education: University of California, Los Angeles (BS)
- Occupations: Actress; mathematics writer; education advocate
- Years active: 1985–present
- Spouses: Michael "Mike" Verta (m. 2009; div. 2012) Scott Sveslosky (m. 2014)
- Children: 1

Danica McKellar (born January 3, 1975) is an American actress, mathematics writer, and education advocate. She is best known for playing Winnie Cooper in the television series The Wonder Years. She has appeared in various television films for the Hallmark Channel. She has also done voice acting including Frieda Goren in Static Shock, Miss Martian in Young Justice, and Killer Frost in DC Super Hero Girls. In 2015, McKellar became part of the main cast in the Netflix original series Project Mc^{2}.

McKellar has written seven non-fiction books about mathematics: Math Doesn't Suck, Kiss My Math, Hot X: Algebra Exposed, Girls Get Curves: Geometry Takes Shape, Goodnight, Numbers, and Do Not Open This Math Book, which encourage middle-school and high-school girls to have confidence and succeed in mathematics.

== Early life and education ==
Danica McKellar was born on January 3, 1975 in La Jolla, California. She moved with her family to Los Angeles when she was eight. Her mother, Mahaila McKellar (née Tello), was a homemaker; her father, Christopher McKellar, is a real estate developer; her younger sister, Crystal, is a lawyer and former child actor. She is of Scottish, French, German, Spanish, and Dutch descent on her father's side. On her mother's side, she is of Portuguese descent, by way of the Azores and the Madeira islands.

In 1998, McKellar earned a Bachelor of Science degree in mathematics (summa cum laude) from University of California, Los Angeles , where she was a member of the Alpha Delta Pi sorority. As an undergraduate, she coauthored a scientific paper with Professor Lincoln Chayes and fellow student Brandy Winn titled "Percolation and Gibbs states multiplicity for ferromagnetic Ashkin–Teller models on $\mathbb{Z}^2$." Their results are termed the "Chayes–McKellar–Winn theorem". Later, when Chayes was asked to comment about the mathematical abilities of his student coauthors, he told The New York Times, "I thought that the two were really, really first-rate." As a result of her past collaborative work on research papers, McKellar is assigned the Erdős number four, and the Erdős–Bacon number six.

== Acting career ==
=== The Wonder Years and early acting career ===
At age seven, McKellar enrolled in weekend acting classes for children at the Lee Strasberg Institute in Los Angeles. In her teens, she landed a prominent role on The Wonder Years, an American television comedy-drama which ran for six seasons on ABC, from 1988 to 1993. She portrayed Gwendolyn "Winnie" Cooper, the main love interest of Kevin Arnold (played by Fred Savage) on the show. Her first kiss was with Savage in an episode of The Wonder Years. She later said, "My first kiss was a pretty nerve-wracking experience! But we never kissed off screen, and pretty quickly our feelings turned into brother/sister, and stayed that way."

=== Later acting career ===
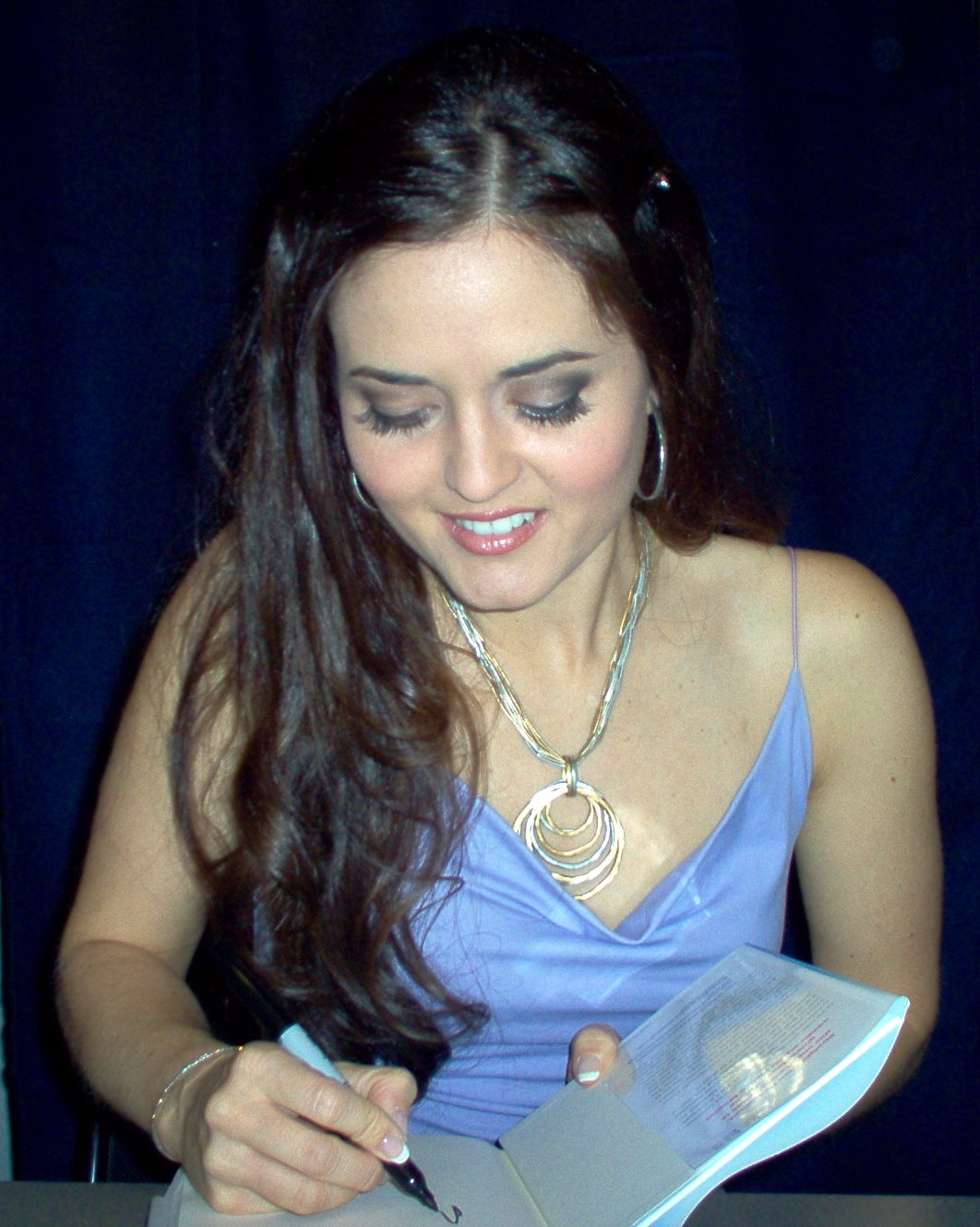
McKellar at a book signing, October 2007

McKellar said that she found it "difficult" to move from being a child actress to an adult actress. Since leaving The Wonder Years, McKellar has had several guest roles in television series (including one with former co-star Fred Savage on Working), and has written and directed two short films. She appeared in two Lifetime films in the Moment of Truth series, playing Kristin Guthrie in 1994's Cradle of Conspiracy and Annie Mills Carman in 1996's Justice for Annie. She briefly returned to regular television with a recurring role in the 2002–03 season of The West Wing, portraying Elsie Snuffin, the half-sister and assistant of Deputy White House Communications Director Will Bailey.

McKellar was featured in the video for Debbie Gibson's eighth single from the Electric Youth album, "No More Rhyme", which was released in 1989. She plays the cello in the beginning of the video. McKellar appeared in lingerie in the July 2005 edition of Stuff magazine after readers voted her the 1990s star they would most like to see in lingerie. She explained that she agreed to the shoot in part to obtain "grittier roles". In 2006, McKellar starred in a Lifetime film and web-based series titled Inspector Mom about a mother who solves mysteries.

On the August 1, 2007, edition of the Don and Mike Show, a WJFK-FM radio program in Washington D.C., McKellar announced that the producers of How I Met Your Mother were planning to bring her back for a recurring role (she guest-starred on the show in late 2005 in "The Pineapple Incident" and again in early 2007 in "Third Wheel"). She made an appearance on the show The Big Bang Theory, in the episode "The Psychic Vortex". In 2008, she starred in Heatstroke, a Sci-Fi Channel film about searching for alien life on Earth, and in 2009 she was one of the stars commenting on the occurrences of the new millennium in VH1's I Love the New Millennium and was the math correspondent for Brink, a program by the Science Channel about technology. In 2013, she played Ellen Plainview in Lifetime's reimagining of the 1956 Alfred Hitchcock film The Wrong Man.

McKellar has also worked as a voice actress, having provided the voice of Jubilee in the video game X-Men Legends (2004), and Invisible Woman in Marvel: Ultimate Alliance (2006) and Marvel: Ultimate Alliance 2 (2009). She provided the voice of Miss Martian in the TV series Young Justice. In 2012, she starred in the Lifetime film Love at the Christmas Table with Dustin Milligan. In January 2013, she starred in the Syfy film Tasmanian Devils with Apolo Ohno.

On August 20, 2013, Canadian singer Avril Lavigne released the music video for her single "Rock N Roll" from her self-titled fifth album, which features McKellar as "Winnie Cooper". On March 4, 2014, it was announced that McKellar would be competing on season 18 of Dancing with the Stars. She paired with Valentin Chmerkovskiy. McKellar and Chmerkovskiy were eliminated on Week 8, finishing in 6th place. She had a guest appearance in the sixth episode of Impractical Jokers season four, which was titled "The Blunder Years". She made another guest appearance in season seven, episode ten, "Speech Impediment". In 2015, she starred in the Netflix original series Project Mc^{2} as The Quail.

She has starred in several Hallmark Channel films, including Crown for Christmas, My Christmas Dream, Campfire Kiss, Love and Sunshine, Christmas at Dollywood, and You, Me & the Christmas Trees, as well as the Hallmark Movies & Mysteries series The Matchmaker Mysteries. McKellar was a judge on the single season of Fox's Domino Masters which premiered on March 9, 2022.

== Writing ==
McKellar has authored several mathematics-related books, primarily targeting adolescent readers interested in succeeding at the study of mathematics. Her first book, Math Doesn't Suck: How to Survive Middle School Math without Losing Your Mind or Breaking a Nail, was a New York Times bestseller, and was favorably reviewed by Tara C. Smith, the founder of Iowa Citizens for Science and a professor of epidemiology at the University of Iowa in Iowa City. The book also received a review from Anthony Jones, writing for the School Librarian journal, who described the book as "a trouble-shooting guide to help girls overcome their biggest maths challenges," noting what he described as "real-world examples of great mathematics in action." In an interview with Smith, McKellar said that she wrote the book "to show girls that math is accessible and relevant, and even a little glamorous" and to counteract "damaging social messages telling young girls that math and science aren't for them".

McKellar's second book, Kiss My Math: Showing Pre-Algebra Who's Boss, was released on August 5, 2008. The book's target audience is girls in the 7th through 9th grades. Her third book, Hot X: Algebra Exposed! covers algebra topics, while the previous two titles were intended as "algebra-readiness books." Hot X was published on August 3, 2010. Her fourth book, Girls Get Curves – Geometry Takes Shape, focuses on the subject of geometry, and attempts to make the subject more accessible.

Three of McKellar's books were listed in The New York Times children's bestseller list. She received Mathical Honors for Goodnight, Numbers.

== Published papers ==
Chayes, L; McKellar, D; Winn, B (1998). "Percolation and Gibbs states multiplicity for ferromagnetic Ashkin–Teller models on $\mathbb{Z}^2$" (PDF). Journal of Physics A: Mathematical and General. 31 (45): 9055–9063. Bibcode:1998JPhA...31.9055C. doi:10.1088/0305-4470/31/45/005.

== Awards and honors ==
McKellar was named Person of the Week on World News with Charles Gibson for the week ending August 10, 2007. The news segment highlighted her book Math Doesn't Suck and her efforts to help girls develop an interest in mathematics, especially during the middle school years. In January 2014, she received the Joint Policy Board for Mathematics (JPBM) Communications Award. The citation credited her books, blog, and public appearances for encouraging "countless middle and high school students, especially girls, to be more interested in mathematics."

== Personal life ==
McKellar married composer Mike Verta on March 22, 2009, in La Jolla, California; the couple had dated since 2001. They had their only child, a son, in 2010. McKellar filed for divorce from Verta in June 2012.

She and her boyfriend Scott Sveslosky got engaged on July 16, 2014. Sveslosky is an attorney and a partner at the law firm Sheppard, Mullin, Richter & Hampton in downtown Los Angeles. On November 15, 2014, they married in Kauaʻi, Hawaii.

In 2022, she became an evangelical Christian and is a member of Shepherd Church in Los Angeles. She cites Candace Cameron Bure as having been a major influence in her life after Bure gave her a copy of the Bible.

== Cultural references ==
McKellar's career in Hallmark mystery films was spoofed in the 2019 film Knives Out, complete with the parody title Deadly By Surprise.

== Filmography ==
=== Film ===
Year	Title	Role	Notes
1992	Sidekicks	Lauren	
2001	Good Neighbor	Molly Wright	
2001	XCU: Extreme Close Up	Sarah	
2001	Speechless...	Dana Woodman	Short film
2002	Sex and the Teenage Mind	Debbie	
2002	Black Hole	Rachael	
2002	Reality School	Sexy Sally	Short film
2002	Jane White Is Sick & Twisted	Tiffany	
2002	The Year That Trembled	Pam Hatch	
2002	Hip, Edgy, Sexy, Cool	Sissie	
2004	Raising Genius	Lacy Baldwin	
2004	Intermission	Sleepwalker	Short film
2004	Quiet Kill	Pet Shop Girl	
2007	Hack!	Emily	
2008	Heatstroke	Caroline	
2009	21 and a Wake-Up	Jenny Valentine	
2010	Scooby-Doo! Abracadabra-Doo	Madelyn Dinkley	Voice, direct-to-video
2010	Superman/Shazam!: The Return of Black Adam	Sally	Voice, direct-to-video
2012	Flatland 2: Sphereland	Aero	Direct-to-video
2012	Mancation	Rebecca	
2014	Where Hope Grows	Susan Malcolm	
2017	The Jetsons & WWE: Robo-WrestleMania!	Judy Jetson	Voice, direct-to-video
2018	The Fiddling Horse	Leslie Heart	
2018	Lego DC Super Hero Girls: Super-Villain High	Frost	Voice, direct-to-video
2018	DC Super Hero Girls: Legends of Atlantis	Frost	Voice, direct-to-video

=== Television ===
Year	Title	Role	Notes
1985–1987	The Twilight Zone	Nola (age 10), Deidre Dobbs	2 episodes
1988–1993	The Wonder Years	Winnie Cooper	Main role (ABC)
1989	The Super Mario Bros. Super Show!	Patty	Voice, 2 episodes
1990	Camp Cucamonga	Lindsey Scott	Television film (NBC)
1992	Captain Planet and the Planeteers	Lisa	Voice, episode: "A Formula for Hate"
1994	Babylon 5	Aria Tensus	Episode: "The War Prayer"
1994	Moment of Truth: Cradle of Conspiracy	Kristin Guthrie	Television film (NBC)
1994	Walker, Texas Ranger	Laurie Maston	Episode: "Stolen Lullaby"
1994	Sirens	Alison Trent	Episode: "Victims"
1996	Justice for Annie: A Moment of Truth Movie	Annie Mills Carman	Television film (NBC)
1998	Love Boat: The Next Wave	Mary Dutton	Episode: "How Long Has This Been Going On?"
1998	Working	Jolie	2 episodes
1999	Random Play	Daughter	Episode: "1.4"
2000–2004	Static Shock	Frieda Goren	Voice, recurring role (15 episodes)
2001	The Division	Wendy	Episode: "Don't Ask"
2001	Even Stevens	Sandrine	Episode: "Sibling Rivalry"
2001	The Weakest Link	Herself	TV Child Stars Special Edition
2002	Justice League	Sapphire Stagg	Voice, episode: "Metamorphosis"
2002–2003	The West Wing	Elsie Snuffin	Recurring role (season 4)
2004	King of the Hill	Misty	Voice, 1 episode
2004	Game Over	Elsa, Renee	Voice, recurring role (season 1)
2004	Century City	Sally	Episode: "Without a Tracer"
2004	Eve	Claudia	Episode: "Friend or Foe?"
2005	NCIS	Erin Kendall	Episode: "Witness"
2005	Jack & Bobby	Keirsten	Episode: "And Justice for All"
2005	NYPD Blue	Rosemary	Episode: "Moving Day"
2005	Strong Medicine	Natalie Pascal	Episode: "Feeling No Pain"
2005	Path of Destruction	Katherine Stern	Television film (Sci-Fi Channel)
2005–2007	How I Met Your Mother	Trudy	Episodes: "The Pineapple Incident" and "Third Wheel"
2006	Inspector Mom	Maddie Monroe	Television film (Lifetime)
2006	Cyberchase	Wanda	Voice, episode: "Designing Mr. Perfect" (PBS Kids Go!)
2006–2007	Inspector Mom	Maddie Monroe	Recurring role (Season 1)
2007	Random! Cartoons	Katerina "Kat" Metropoulos	Voice, episode: "Girls on the Go: The First Date"
2010	The Big Bang Theory	Abby	Episode: "The Psychic Vortex"
2010–2013, 2019–2022	Young Justice	Miss Martian, Marie Logan, Tuppence Terror, Angel O'Day, Reach Commercial Singer	Voice, main role
2010–2013	Generator Rex	Claire	Voice, 3 episodes
2010	G.I. Joe: Renegades	Sister Leia	Voice, episode: "Brothers of Light"
2012	The Nerdist: Tribute to Science	Herself	Talk show
2012	Love at the Christmas Table	Katherine "Kat" Patton	Television film (Lifetime)
2013	Tasmanian Devils	Alex	Television film (Syfy)
2013	The Secret Life of the American Teenager	Herself	Episode: "Interference"
2013	Nerdist: Course of the Force	Bounty Hunter	Episode: "Michael Rooker & CM Punk: Lighstaber Hunt"
2013	The Wrong Woman	Ellen Plainview	Television film (Lifetime)
2014	Transformers: Rescue Bots	Hayley	Voice, 2 episodes
2014	Dancing with the Stars	Herself	Contestant on season 18; finished in sixth place
2014	Phineas and Ferb	Becky	Voice, episode: "Doof 101"
2015	King of the Nerds	Herself	Judge
2015, 2017–2018	Impractical Jokers	Herself	3 episodes
2015	Perfect Match (aka A Perfect Wedding)	Jessica Summers	Television film (Hallmark Channel)
2015	Miss America 2016	Herself	Judge
2015	Crown for Christmas	Allie Evans	Television film (Hallmark Channel)
2015–2017	Project Mc^{2}	The Quail	Main role (Seasons 1–2,4–5); Netflix original series
2015–2018	DC Super Hero Girls	Frost	Voice, recurring role (Seasons 1–5)
2016	My Christmas Dream	Christina	Television film (Hallmark Channel)
2016	Wedding Bells	Molly	Television film (Hallmark Channel)
2016–2018	Shimmer and Shine	Layla, Generic Female Genie	Voice, 3 episodes
2017	Mommy, I Didn't Do It	Ellen Plainview	Television film (Lifetime)
2017	Campfire Kiss	Dana	Television film (Hallmark Channel)
2017	Coming Home for Christmas	Lizzie	Television film (Hallmark Channel)
2018	Rise of the Teenage Mutant Ninja Turtles	Taylor Martin	Voice, episode: "Hypno! Part Deux!"
2018	Very, Very, Valentine	Helen	Television film (Hallmark Channel)
2018	Love in Design	Hannah	Television film (Hallmark Channel)
2018	Christmas at Grand Valley	Kelly	Television film (Hallmark Movies & Mysteries)
2019	Love and Sunshine	Ally Craig	Television film (Hallmark Channel)
2019	The Matchmaker Mysteries: A Killer Engagement	Angie Dove	Television film (Hallmark Movies & Mysteries)
2019	Christmas at Dollywood	Rachel	Television film (Hallmark Channel)
2020	Matchmaker Mysteries: A Fatal Romance	Angie Dove	Television film (Hallmark Movies & Mysteries)
2020	Christmas She Wrote	Kayleigh King	Television film (Hallmark Channel)
2021	Matchmaker Mysteries: The Art of the Kill	Angie Dove	Television film (Hallmark Movies & Mysteries)
2021–2022	Home Economics	Allison	2 episodes
2021	You, Me & the Christmas Trees	Olivia Arden	Television film (Hallmark Channel)
2022	The Winter Palace	Emily Miller	Television film (Great American Family)
2022	Domino Masters	Herself	Judge
2022	Christmas at the Drive-In	Sadie Walker	Television film (Great American Family)
2023	Swing into Romance	Christine Sims	Television film (Great American Family)
2023	A Royal Date for Christmas	Bella Sparks	Television film (Great American Family)
2024	A Cinderella Christmas Ball	Chelsea Jones	Television film (Great American Family)
2025	Futurama	Herself	Episode: "The Numberland Gap"
2025	Grounded in Love	Annie	Television film (Great American Family)
2025	Have We Met This Christmas?	Katie Sloan	Television film (Great American Family)
2026	The Christmas Yes List	Chloe	Television film (Great American Family)
2026	The Greatest Christmas Gift	Emma	Television film (Great American Family)

=== Music videos ===
Year	Title	Role	Artist
1989	"No More Rhyme"	Girl Playing Cello	Debbie Gibson
2013	"Rock n Roll"	Winnie Cooper	Avril Lavigne

=== Video games ===
Year	Title	Role
2004	X-Men Legends	Jubilee
2004	EverQuest II	Lolla Cotgrove / Pona
2006	Marvel: Ultimate Alliance	Invisible Woman
2009	Marvel: Ultimate Alliance 2	Invisible Woman
2013	Young Justice: Legacy	Miss Martian, Batgirl

== Books ==
- McKellar, Danica; Mary Lynn Blasutta (2008). Math Doesn't Suck: How to Survive Middle School Math without Losing Your Mind or Breaking a Nail. New York: Plume. ISBN 9780452289499.
- McKellar, Danica (2009). Kiss My Math: Showing Pre-Algebra Who's Boss. New York: Plume. ISBN 9780452295407.
- McKellar, Danica (2010). Hot X: Algebra Exposed. New York: Plume. ISBN 9780452297197.
- McKellar, Danica (2012). Girls Get Curves: Geometry Takes Shape. New York: Hudson Street Press. ISBN 9781594630941.
- McKellar, Danica (2017). Goodnight, Numbers. New York: Random House Children's Books. ISBN 9780593643556.
- McKellar, Danica (2018). Ten Magic Butterflies. New York: Random House Children's Books. ISBN 9781101933824.
- McKellar, Danica (2018). Do Not Open This Math Book. New York: Random House Children's Books. ISBN 9781101933985.
- McKellar, Danica (2019). Bathtime Mathtime. New York: Random House Children's Books. ISBN 9781101933961.
- McKellar, Danica (2020). The Times Machine. New York: Random House Children's Books. ISBN 9781101934029.
- McKellar, Danica (2022). Double Puppy Trouble. New York: Random House Children's Books. ISBN 9781101933862.
