= Hairshirt (disambiguation) =

A hairshirt is a cilice, an uncomfortable shirt worn by some Catholics and, earlier, by Jews as a sign of penance.

Hairshirt may also refer to:

- "Hairshirt", a song by R.E.M. from their 1988 album Green
- Hairshirt (film), a 1998 motion picture starring Dean Paras, Chris Hogan, Evan Glenn and Neve Campbell
