= When Friendship Kills =

1996 television film by James A. Contner

- Also known as: A Secret Between Friends: A Moment of Truth Movie
- Genre: Drama
- Written by: Elizabeth Gill
- Directed by: James A. Contner
- Starring: Lynda Carter; Katie Wright; Marley Shelton
- Theme music composer: Stacy Widelitz; John G. Lenic (assistant producer)
- Country of origin: United States
- Original language: English

Production
- Executive producers: Lawrence Horowitz; Michael O'Hara
- Producer: Tracey Jeffrey
- Production locations: Vancouver; Los Angeles
- Cinematography: Richard Leiterman
- Editor: Thomas Fries
- Running time: 96 minutes
- Production companies: Libra Pictures; O'Hara-Horowitz Productions

Original release
- Network: NBC
- Release: February 19, 1996

When Friendship Kills (also released as A Secret Between Friends: A Moment of Truth Movie) is a 1996 American made-for-television drama film directed by James A. Contner. The movie is a part of the Moment of Truth franchise and deals with the danger of anorexia nervosa among teens.

== Plot ==
Lexi Archer is a teenager who, after the divorce of her parents, moves with her mother Kathryn and younger sister Jill from Chicago to Seattle. At her new school, she befriends Jennifer Harnsberger, a popular straight-A student whom she meets during volleyball tryouts. After her volleyball coach suggests that Lexi should lose a few pounds in order to enhance her athletic performance, she starts to look for ways to diet. When Jennifer admits to being bulimic, they decide to diet and work out together.

Kathryn notices that her daughter is eating less and becoming thinner, but she is too preoccupied with her divorce to realize there is a problem. Lexi becomes adept at hiding the true nature of her eating habits. Meanwhile, Lexi and Jill visit their father in Chicago and try to convince him to reunite with Kathryn, but they soon discover that he is dating a new woman, Jolene.

Kathryn begins to suspect an eating disorder when she finds out that Lexi has not had her period in over three months. She consults a gynaecologist, but she tells her that Lexi is at a normal weight. She attributes Lexi's weight loss to the trauma of the divorce. Lexi appeared to weigh more at the doctor's because she clandestinely placed eight bundles of coins on her body to make her appear to be heavier.

Meanwhile, she and Jennifer consider being models. They are excited to be contacted by Nick McKay, a photographer, but he is interested only in Jennifer and explains that Lexi is not fit to be a model. Upset, she starts to diet even more and she eventually collapses during a volleyball match. She is hospitalized, diagnosed with anorexia nervosa and is forced to enter a recovery program.

Her parents have different opinions about her treatment and start to argue. Nevertheless, she eventually recovers and is released. She admits to her mother that Jennifer has an eating disorder as well, and a worried Kathryn immediately informs Jennifer's mother. Although Pamela dismisses the possibility of her daughter having such a condition, Jennifer feels betrayed when she hears about it and refuses to speak to Lexi, for which she blames her mother. Lexi tries to confront her at a party, but a drunken Jennifer angrily leaves, only to be hit by a car. She is taken to a hospital and dies of a cardiac arrest.

Lexi has trouble dealing with her friend's death and relapses with her eating disorder. Devastated, her mother tries to help her, assuring her that Jennifer's death can't be blamed on her. Her father wants her to be hospitalized again, but Kathryn insists she can help Lexi herself. He is successful in getting a court order to hospitalize her, but Lexi is in the end able to recover on her own, encouraged by her mother.

The film ends as Lexi participates in a volleyball match, where she sees Jen's spirit who smiles at her, her mother, sister, even her father (who probably reconciled with his estranged wife onscreen) and doctor cheer her on and she wins the match.

== Cast ==
- Lynda Carter as Kathryn Archer
- Katie Wright as Alexis 'Lexi' Archer
- Marley Shelton as Jennifer 'Jen' Harnsberger
- Josh Taylor as Peter Archer
- Colleen Winton as Pamela Harnsberger
- Kimberley Warnat as Jill Archer
- Malcolm Stewart as Mr. Harnsberger
- Kevin McNulty as Ted
- Ryan Reynolds as Ben Colson
- Tobias Mehler as Justin Phelps
- Lochlyn Munro as Nick McKay
