= Murder in the Heartland =

- Genre: Drama; Thriller
- Written by: Michael O'Hara
- Directed by: Robert Markowitz
- Starring: Tim Roth; Fairuza Balk; Brian Dennehy; Randy Quaid; Renée Zellweger; Kate Reid; Milo O'Shea; Rondi Reed
- Theme music composer: Patrick Williams
- Country of origin: United States
- Original language: English

Production
- Executive producers: Lawrence Horowitz; Michael O'Hara
- Producer: S. Bryan Hickox
- Production locations: McKinney, Texas; Van Alstyne, Texas
- Cinematography: Ronald Victor Garcia
- Editors: David Beatty; Scott Vickrey
- Running time: 157 minutes
- Production company: O'Hara-Horowitz Productions

Original release
- Network: ABC
- Release: May 3, 1993

Murder in the Heartland is a television miniseries that aired on ABC in 1993. It was based on the 1957–58 murder spree carried out by 19-year-old Charles Starkweather throughout Nebraska and Wyoming. Starkweather is played by Tim Roth. The first half of the miniseries covers the murders. The second half covers the trials of Starkweather and Caril Ann Fugate, his 14-year-old girlfriend accomplice. Their increasingly disparate versions of events are contrasted as the trials unfold.

The film received strong praise from critics and Emmy nominations.

== Cast ==
- Tim Roth as Charles Starkweather
- Fairuza Balk as Caril Ann Fugate
- Randy Quaid as Elmer Scheele
- Brian Dennehy as John McArthur
- Roberts Blossom as August "Gus" Meyer
- Tom Bower as Marion Bartlett
- Jennifer Griffin as Velda Bartlett
- Rondi Reed as Jonette Fox
- Bob Gunton as Governor Anderson
- Ryan Cutrona as C. Lauer Ward
- Angie Bolling as Clara Ward
- Jake Carpenter as Robert Jensen
- Heather Kafka as Carol King
- Don Bloomfield as Bobby Colvert
- John Hussey as Mr. Jensen
- James Hansen Prince as Deputy Sheriff Bill Romer
- John S. Davies as Merle Karnopp
- Mark Walters as Chief Robert Ainslie
- Milo O'Shea as Clem Gaughan
- Gerry Bamman as Judge Brooks
- Jeff Perry as Earl Heflin
- Connie Cooper as Hazel Heflin
- Kate Reid as Pansy Street
- Marco Perella as Bob Von Busch (uncredited)
- Renée Zellweger as Barbara Von Busch (uncredited)
- Gary Mitchell Carter as Rodney Starkweather (uncredited)

== Production ==
The entire film was shot on location in and around McKinney and Dallas, Texas.

An edited version of the production saw a limited release on VHS.

== Awards and nominations ==
Year	Award	Category	Nominee(s)	Result	Ref.
1993	Artios Awards	Best Casting for TV Mini-Series	Molly Lopata	Won	
1993	Primetime Emmy Awards	Outstanding Supporting Actor in a Miniseries or a Special	Brian Dennehy	Nominated	
1993	Primetime Emmy Awards	Outstanding Individual Achievement in Cinematography for a Miniseries or a Special	Ronald Victor Garcia	Nominated	
1994	American Society of Cinematographers Awards	Outstanding Achievement in Cinematography in a Miniseries	Ronald Victor Garcia	Nominated	

== See also ==
- The Sadist, a 1963 film by James Landis.
- Terrence Malick's 1973 movie Badlands, and the title song from Bruce Springsteen's 1982 album Nebraska.
- The 1994 film Natural Born Killers was also partly inspired by these events.
- The 2004 film Starkweather directed by Bryon Werner.
