= Eye of the Stalker =

1995 television film directed by Reza Badiyi

- Genre: Drama; Thriller
- Written by: Priscilla English
- Directed by: Reza Badiyi
- Starring: Brooke Langton; Joanna Cassidy; Jere Burns
- Music by: Stacy Widelitz
- Country of origin: United States
- Original language: English

Production
- Executive producers: Lawrence Horowitz; Michael O'Hara
- Producer: Rick Blumenthal
- Production locations: Los Angeles; Phoenix, Arizona
- Cinematography: Charles Mills
- Editor: Ron Spang
- Running time: 95 minutes
- Production company: O'Hara-Horowitz Productions

Original release
- Network: NBC
- Release: December 18, 1995

Eye of the Stalker (a.k.a. Moment of Truth: Eye of the Stalker and Eye of the Stalker: A Moment of Truth Story) is a 1995 American made-for-television thriller film directed by Reza Badiyi. Based on a true story, the film is an original Moment of Truth movie that stars Brooke Langton, Joanna Cassidy and Jere Burns.

== Plot ==
Beth Knowlton (Brooke Langton) is a young art student who is majoring in photography at a college in Phoenix, Arizona. Stephen Primes (Jere Burns) teaches law at the same university and becomes infatuated with Beth at first sight. To get close to her, he hires her to take some photos of him. After the shoot, he sends a stuffed bear to her home as a gift. Beth is not impressed with Stephen's unwanted actions and firmly tries to be clear that she is not interested since she is already dating Kyle Kennedy (Woolson). Despite her refusals, Stephen persists, breaking up her relationship and begins telling people that he and Beth have become engaged. This gains the attention of Beth's mother Martha (Cassidy), who tries (but fails) to find a legal manner for Stephen to leave Beth alone. Beth leaves her job at the camera shop to avoid Stephen's attention.

After a while, Stephen's stalking actions escalate, becoming increasingly awkward and obsessive. He leaves Beth cut-out notes, breaks into her apartment and one day attempts to strangle her in a darkroom. Martha encourages Beth to move in with her and they both press charges, but the police are unable to arrest Stephen without a sign of evidence. Immediately after moving in, Martha and Beth find their home burglarized and a message "Obey or die" written on a bathroom mirror. Knowing how far Stephen will go, Martha sends Beth off to live with her brother Duncan in Denver, Colorado under a fake name.

Stephen becomes enraged when he loses sight of Beth and mistakenly becomes preoccupied with another Elizabeth Knowlton (known as Liz). Thinking he has tracked Beth down, Liz receives phone calls and packages in her mail from Stephen containing threats as well as a video of him and Beth. When Stephen attempts to break into her home one night, Liz manages to track Beth down after recognizing him from the video. They both join forces to catch Stephen in the act, using Beth as bait. Liz gives Beth a loaded gun as an extra precaution, which Beth eventually uses upon seeing Stephen holding and threatening Martha with a knife. After tricking Stephen into thinking she will leave with him, Beth grabs the gun and holds him at gunpoint. Stephen drops the knife and releases Martha but raves that Beth will not hurt him and she loves him. In angry tears, Beth expresses her hatred towards Stephen, denounces him and declares he will not control her anymore. Stephen persists in his delusion until Beth fires two warning shots, causing a shocked Stephen to back down and surrender. Stephen then remarks in a resigned, stunned tone that Beth is "just like all the rest", hinting that he had obsessed over and stalked other girls in the past.

The film ends as Stephen is finally arrested, and Martha and Beth, relieved that he will be out of their lives forever, embrace each other as a caption says, "According to recent Congressional testimony, an estimated 5% of the U.S. female population will be victimized by a stalker. In response, all 50 states and the District of Columbia have passed anti-stalking legislation."

== Cast ==
- Brooke Langton as Elizabeth 'Beth' Knowlton
- Joanna Cassidy as Judge Martha Knowlton
- Jere Burns as Stephen Primes
- Dennis Burkley as Danny Zerbo
- Lucinda Jenney as Elizabeth 'Liz' Knowlton
- Michael Woolson as Kyle Kennedy
- Conor O'Farrell as Officer Lane
- Barbara Tarbuck as Judge Paula Castanon
- John Bennett Perry as Duncan Emerson
- Lindsey Ginter as Officer Weldon
- Jonathan Ward as Neil
- Rick Worthy as Eric
- Michael Cavanaugh as Judge Warren Curtis
- James MacDonald as Gerry
- Matthew Faison as College Dean
