= Detention: The Siege at Johnson High =

1997 American television film

- Genre: Crime; Drama; Thriller
- Written by: Larry Golin
- Directed by: Michael Watkins
- Starring: Rick Schroder; Freddie Prinze Jr. Katie Wright; Alexis Cruz
- Music by: Brian Adler
- Country of origin: United States
- Original language: English

Production
- Executive producers: Joel Fields; Leonard Hill
- Producers: Matthew Loze; Steve Natt
- Production locations: Jordan High School - 95 Beetdigger Blvd., Sandy, Utah
- Cinematography: Bill Roe
- Editor: Peter B. Ellis
- Running time: 93 minutes
- Production companies: Hill/Fields Entertainment; Natt Loze Films

Original release
- Network: ABC
- Release: May 19, 1997

Detention: The Siege at Johnson High (also known as Hostage High and Target for Rage) is a 1997 American made-for-television thriller drama film based on the 1992 Lindhurst High School shooting and siege that resulted in the death of four people. The film, written by Larry Golin and directed by Michael W. Watkins, stars Rick Schroder, Freddie Prinze Jr., Katie Wright, Alexis Cruz and Henry Winkler. It was originally broadcast on ABC on May 19, 1997.

== Plot ==
Years ago, Jason Copeland, now 24, failed his final exams and did not graduate Johnson High School, for which he still holds his former History teacher, Mr. Kroft, responsible. He decides to take revenge and enters the school with a 12-gauge shotgun, a revolver, and a massive supply of ammunition. He first starts shooting around, hitting several students. After shooting Mr. Kroft, he decides to take as many hostages as possible in one room. Among them is Aaron Sullivan, a gifted but lazy student who is assigned to answer the phone. Meanwhile, Frankie Rodriguez, the class clown, is ordered to be the message boy, picking up and delivering information and other things from the FBI to Jason.

Skip Fine is the only hostage negotiator in town, despite being generally regarded as less than the brightest penny on the local police force. Over the telephone he attempts to convince Jason to release his hostages and is almost successful, until Jason suddenly hears a noise from the halls. Frankie is set out to locate the remaining persons in the building and although he finds a filled classroom, he returns with only one pupil. Jason soon realizes there are others still in the building when he hears an FBI agent trying to break into that room. He ends up shooting him and taking the remaining students hostage.

Meanwhile, Skip decides to quit, feeling he is not prepared enough to be involved with such a responsible job. Jason, however, refuses to talk to the FBI and insists on speaking to Skip only. From this point, Jason softens up, allowing the hostages to order food. Not realizing the seriousness of the situation, most hostages still think Jason is only using the weapons as a threat, and most of them do not realize he has already fatally shot people, including Mr. Kroft. Meanwhile, Aaron wins Jason's trust and is able to deliver local cop Matt Eckert a list with the names of all 62 hostages. Matt is shocked to find out that among them is his daughter Samantha. On their way back, Aaron and Frankie find the body of Travis McGill, one of the few students killed, and they finally realize how dangerous Jason really is.

After being back in the room where the people are taken hostage, Aaron is allowed to let 15 people go. He offers Samantha to be one of them, but she insists on staying. When Jason finds out six students have already been rumored to be killed, he loses his temper and puts a gun to Samantha's head. Skip, however, is able to talk him out of shooting her. Afterwards, he loses his attention for a moment, during which Aaron and Samantha help several people escape. A sniper is ready to shoot Jason, but Skip insists on convincing Jason to give himself up instead. Soon, another 20 students are released and Jason signs a contract in which he agrees to let go the remaining hostages if he is sent to jail for under five years.

Despite an attempted attack on Jason by Frankie, for killing Travis, every student is eventually released. Jason thanks Aaron for his help and gives himself over to the police afterwards. Aaron and Samantha are embraced as the heroes of the tragedy and Jason is sent to death row for killing four people.

== Characters ==
- Freddie Prinze Jr. as Aaron Sullivan
- Rick Schroder as Jason Copeland
- Katie Wright as Samantha Eckert
- Alexis Cruz as Frankie Rodriguez
- Henry Winkler as Skip Fine
- Patrick Malone as Travis McGill
- Pat Finn as Mr. Kroft
- Troy Bryant as Matt Eckert
- Ren Woods as Mrs. McGill
- Michael Flynn as Sheriff Randall
