= Renn Woods =

American actress

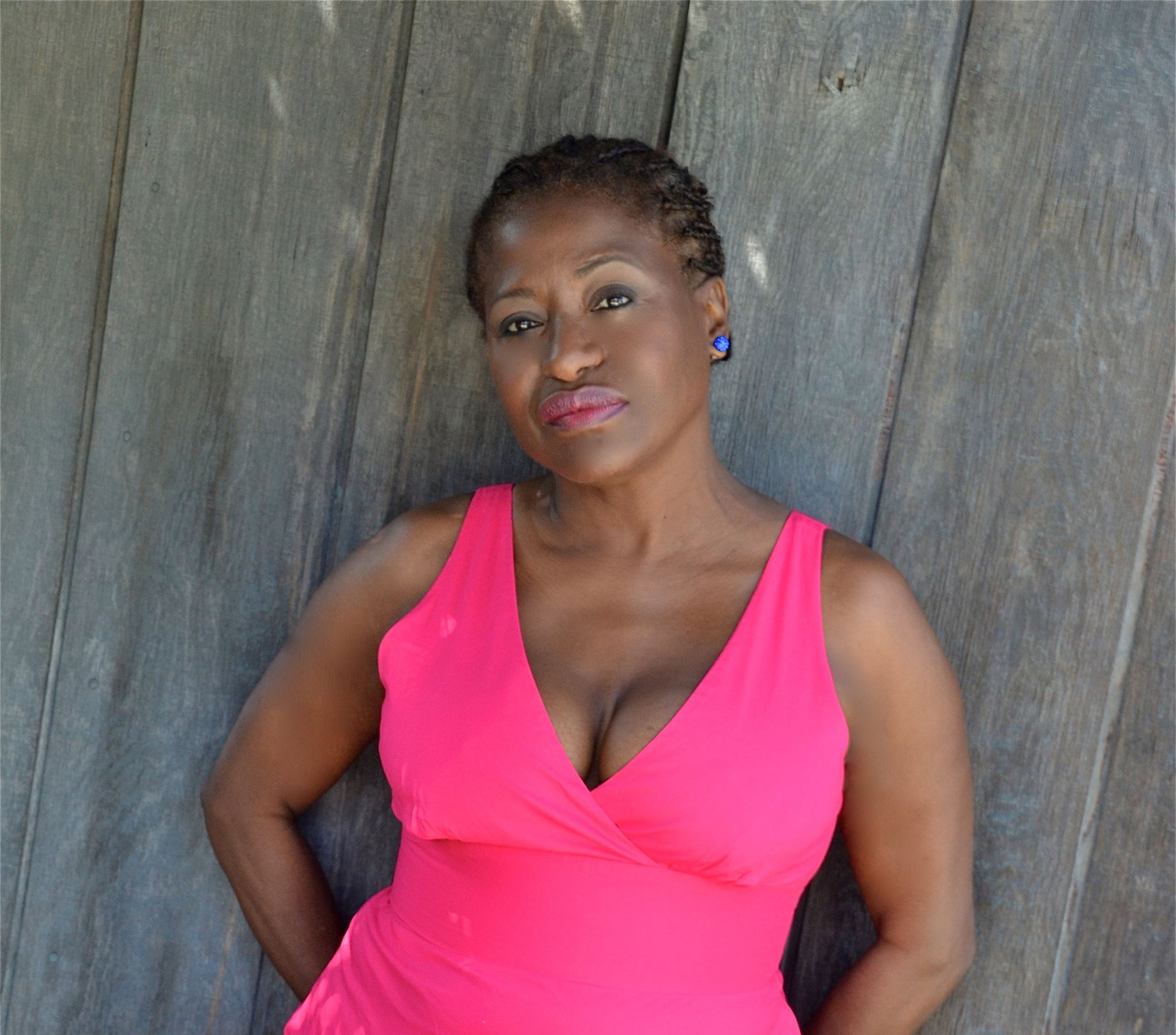
- Woods in Los Angeles, 2014
- Born: January 1, 1958 (age 68); Chicago, Illinois, U.S.
- Occupations: Actress, vocalist, songwriter
- Years active: 1976–present
- Website: therealrennwoods.com

Renn Woods (born Ren Woods; January 1, 1958) is an American film, television and stage actress, vocalist and songwriter. She is best known for her role as Fanta in Roots, for her performance of "Aquarius" in the film version of Hair (1979) and as Edie in the TV series Beauty and the Beast (1987–1989).

Woods was born in Chicago and raised in Portland, Oregon, where she attracted attention as part of Three Little Souls, a local musical trio she formed at age ten. The group subsequently became known as Sunday's Child, and toured internationally through Wood's adolescent years, appearing on television with such acts as Bob Hope. In adulthood, Woods transitioned into acting, starring as Fanta in Roots (1977), and the "Aquarius" soloist in Hair (1979). She also had a supporting role in the comedy The Jerk (1979).

She also appeared onstage as Dorothy in the first national touring production of The Wiz, and as The Moon in a Los Angeles production of Caroline, or Change.

== Early life ==
Woods was born in Chicago, Illinois, one of six children, and was raised in Portland, Oregon by her divorced mother, who was a nurse. Woods described her mother as a "politically conscious and very unusual woman." Woods and her siblings attended private Catholic schools in Portland. At age eight, Woods began singing in a trio with two friends in her neighborhood, performing as the Three Little Souls.

She added an extra "n" to her first name to lessen confusion with a company that used the domain name Renwoods.

== Career beginnings ==
Renn began singing at the age of six. By age 10, she and two girlfriends began performing under the group name Sunday's Child, and performed on television programs with Jack Benny, Bob Hope, and Bing Crosby. The trio toured the world, performing the very last tour of duty with Bob Hope in Vietnam.

In 1979, she released a solo album, Out of the Woods, which was produced by Earth, Wind & Fire member Al McKay. A second album, Azz Izz, was released in 1982. Azz Izz was well received. The second album featured a new composition by Prince titled "I Don't Wanna Stop." Woods released a third album featuring jazz standards, Crazy, in 2015.

Renn is currently recording her first American Songbook CD.

== Acting career ==
Woods first came to national attention in the role of Dorothy in the first national Broadway tour of "The Wiz" in 1976. She subsequently appeared as Fanta in Roots in 1977, a role for which she won a People's Choice Award. She also sang the opening song, "Aquarius", in Miloš Forman’s movie musical version of Hair (1979).

In 1984, Woods acted in John Sayles's science-fiction comedy film The Brother from Another Planet. She, Darryl Edwards, Steve James, and Bill Cobbs play barflies. Reviewer Deborah Jerome of The Record said that they brought good performances to the film.

She appeared in other American television series, including What's Happening!!, Lou Grant, Hill Street Blues, The White Shadow, The Jeffersons, Roc, Sabrina, the Teenage Witch, Beauty and the Beast and NYPD Blue. She starred as Edie in the TV series Beauty and the Beast. She starred as Mrs. McGill in the TV movie Detention: The Siege at Johnson High.

In 2015, she appeared in the TVOne documentary series Unsung. In 2016, she appeared in the TruInside tv documentary The Jerk, about the film she had co-starred in with Steve Martin, exploring what makes the comedy a classic.

Woods created a one-woman autobiographical musical, A Diva Like Me, in the 1990s, which she expanded into an ensemble version, Sold: Renn Woods in Concert (A Play in Rhythm and Blues).

She also appeared in the musical Caroline, or Change as The Moon at the Ahmanson Theatre in Los Angeles.

== Filmography ==
=== Film ===
Year	Title	Role	Notes
1976	Sparkle	Jim Dandy Singer	Uncredited
1976	Car Wash	Loretta	
1978	Youngblood	Sybil	
1979	Hair	'Aquarius' soloist	
1979	The Jerk	Elvira	
1980	Xanadu	Jo	
1980	9 to 5	Barbara	
1982	Penitentiary II	Nikki	
1984	The Brother from Another Planet	Bernice	
1985	Beer	Mary Morrison	
1986	Jumpin' Jack Flash	Jackie	
1987	Walker	Alta Kewen	
1988	From Hollywood to Deadwood	Christine	
1992	Judgement	Hollie Glass	
1996	Crazy World	Wilma	
1997	Detention: The Siege at Johnson High	Mrs. McGill	
2007	The Blue Hour	Aria	
2010	Church	Sister Dee	
2015	Unsung Hollywood	Herself	Documentary
2016	TruInside "The Jerk"	Herself	Documentary

=== Television ===
Year	Title	Role	Notes
1977	Roots	Fanta	Miniseries
1977	What's Happening!!	Brenda	Episode: "Dwayne's Dilemma"
1977	We've Got Each Other	Donna	9 episodes
1978	Insight	Angie	Episode: "It Can't Happen to Me"
1979	The White Shadow	Darlene Robinson	Episode: "Pregnant Pause"
1982	Lou Grant	Karly	Episode: "Suspect"
1984	The Jeffersons	Rhonda	Episode: "A New Girl in Town"
1986–1987	Hill Street Blues	Hooker / Jackie Lowrie	2 episodes
1989	TV 101	Teenage Pregnancy Counselor	Episode: "First Love: Part 2"
1987–1989	Beauty and the Beast	Edie	44 episodes
1989	Monsters	Cora	Episode: "Love Hurts"
1993	Roc	Pam	Episode: "Shove It Up Your Aspirin"
1995	The Client	Doctor	Episode: "The Prodigal Father"
1995	NYPD Blue	Lisa	Episode: "These Old Bones"
1996	Sabrina, the Teenage Witch	Mrs. Hecht	Episode: "Pilot"
1996	Relativity	Receptionist	Episode: "Jake Gets a Job"
2001	That's Life	Clerk	Episode: "Larva"
