= Moment of Truth (film series) =

1990s television film series

Moment of Truth is an anthology series of made-for-television films produced for and aired by NBC from 1993 until 1998. As with most films of the time, the series specifically targeted women and mainly featured everyday women, including their daughters, in some kind of peril, danger or other situation, which were often adapted from real-life events, promoted as "ripped from the headlines". The films also had a second life, airing often on Lifetime and its sister made-for-TV movie channel.

The TV movies produced in the series are as follows:

No.	Title	Directed by	Written by	Original release date
1	"Why My Daughter?"	Chuck Bowman	Liz Coe	April 28, 1993
After a young prostitute (Jamie Luner) is murdered and left in a rubbish heap, her mother (Linda Gray) does everything to track down the killer.
2	"A Child Too Many"	Jorge Montesi	Jayne Martin	October 11, 1993
The true story of a surrogate mother who discovers that she is due to have twins, but the couple she is bearing the children for only want one of them.
3	"Stalking Back"	Corey Allen	Priscilla English	October 18, 1993
14 year old Laurisa Anello (LuAnne Ponce) is an honor student, a talented athlete, and prominent flute player in her high school's marching band in St. Petersburg, Florida. While playing softball the teenage girl attracts the unwelcome attention of one of her softball umpires, Curt Harper. He sends unwelcome flowers and gifts to Laurisa's home and both her mother, Linda (Shanna Reed) and father, Nelson (John Martin) confront him in the hopes of getting him to stop. However, his conduct only escalates. Curt (Tom Kurlander) follows Laurisa not only to her school, to marching band practice, to being out with friends - there is nothing he won't do to harass her. The Anellos report his actions to police but are told nothing can be done as Florida state laws protect him. When he continues to show up at her school, they take him to court. Curt ignores the court order to stay away from Laurisa and carries on. Again, Curt goes to court where two judges order him to stay away or risk jail time. Laurisa becomes a prisoner in her home, loses friends, and can't drive anywhere at night because of Curt. Linda finally has enough of law enforcement's inability to act and with the help of a state representative goes to Tallahassee to lobby for a state stalking law. While she is in Tallahassee, Curt strikes again - this time by trapping Laurisa in her own garage. Fortunately, a police officer and Mr. Anello catch Curt red handed and he was arrested. This story is one of the cases that led to the implementation of Florida’s anti-stalking statute in 1992.
4	"To Walk Again"	Randall Zisk	George Eckstein	February 16, 1994
A marine is paralyzed after being shot during a training exercise, leaving his parents to fight to get him proper medical care.
5	"Broken Pledges"	Gabrielle Beaumont	Jayne Martin	April 11, 1994
A woman fights for a law to be passed to stop fraternity hazing which resulted in her son's death.
6	"Cradle of Conspiracy"	Gabrielle Beaumont	Jayne Martin	May 2, 1994
Parents fight to save their pregnant teenage daughter (Danica McKellar) from an underworld of baby brokers.
7	"Caught in the Crossfire"	Chuck Bowman	Dan Levine	September 14, 1994
An undercover reporter named Gus finds work with the FBI, but soon he gets into a difficult situation and the FBI ignores it.
8	"A Mother’s Deception"	Chuck Bowman	Dan Levine	October 17, 1994
A depressed woman seeks help from a therapist, but the doctor's eccentric therapy gives Nora's family cause for concern.
9	"Murder or Memory?"	Christopher Leitch	Dan Levine	December 12, 1994
A mother fights to prove her 14-year-old son is innocent of a murder he confessed to under hypnosis.
10	"The Other Mother"	Bethany Rooney	Steven Loring	April 17, 1995
A woman embarks on an emotional search for the son she was forced to give up for adoption twenty years earlier.
11	"Deceived by Trust"	Chuck Bowman	Jayne Martin	October 23, 1995
A high school social worker (Stepfanie Kramer) begins to suspect that a powerful principal (Michael Gross) is sexually harassing his students, but no one will testify.
12	"Eye of the Stalker"	Reza Badiyi	Priscilla English	December 18, 1995
A college student (Brooke Langton) is stalked by a disturbed older man (Jere Burns).
13	"Justice For Annie"	Noel Nosseck	Joyce Brotman	January 15, 1996
A woman discovers that the accidental death of her daughter was tied to an insurance scam.
14	"When Friendship Kills"	James A. Contner	Elizabeth Gill	February 19, 1996
Two friends keep their vomiting a secret until one of them nearly dies.
15	"Abduction of Innocence"	James A. Contner	Derek Marlowe	October 7, 1996
A rebellious teenager (Katie Wright) falls in with the wrong crowd, and is accused of staging her own abduction in a ploy to get back at her strict father (Dirk Benedict).
16	"Stand Against Fear"	Joseph L. Scanlan	Natalie Chaidez	December 16, 1996
A cheerleader takes action when she faces sexual intimidation from football players at her high school.
17	"Into the Arms of Danger"	Chuck Bowman	John Bensink	February 3, 1997
A Utah teen fends off her mom's lecherous boyfriend and flees to Los Angeles.
18	"The Accident"	Chuck Bowman	Susan Baskin	September 15, 1997
A teen charged with manslaughter in a drunken driving crash that killed her best friend uses alcohol to cope.
19	"Playing to Win"	James A. Contner	Susan Baskin	February 11, 1998
A young girl is taken with a boy that she meets, but he leads her into gambling where she begins losing money, becomes desperate, and starts to steal.
20	"Race Against Fear" "Broken Silence"	Joseph L. Scanlan	Jean Gennis	September 7, 1998
After a young track star (Ariana Richards) is raped by her coach, no one but her mother (Susan Blakely) believes her story.
21	"Someone to Love Me"	Chuck Bowman	Elizabeth Gill	September 14, 1998
A promiscuous girl is raped by a fellow student.
22	"Shattered Hearts"	James A. Contner	Kathryn Pratt	December 7, 1998
A high school student supports her boyfriend when he is diagnosed with leukemia.
