= 1992 Lindhurst High School shooting =

1992 mass shooting in Olivehurst, California, US

Coordinates: 39°05′04″N 121°32′09″W

- Location: Olivehurst, California, United States
- Date: May 1, 1992; 2:40 – c. 11:30 p.m. (PST)
- Target: Students and staff of Lindhurst High School
- Attack type: School shooting; mass murder; mass shooting; child murder; hostage taking; siege
- Weapons: 6-shot 12-gauge Mossberg Maverick 88 pump-action shotgun; Sawed-off .22-caliber semi-automatic rifle
- Deaths: 4
- Injuries: 10
- Perpetrator: Eric Houston

The Lindhurst High School shooting was a school shooting and subsequent hostage that occurred on May 1, 1992, at Lindhurst High School in Olivehurst, California, United States. The gunman, 20-year-old Eric Houston (born June 8, 1971), was a former student at Lindhurst High School. Houston killed three students and one teacher and wounded nine students and a teacher before surrendering to police. Houston was sentenced to death for the murders, and he is currently on California's death row in San Quentin State Prison.

It, along with the 1998 Thurston High School shooting, used to be the deadliest high school shootings in modern U.S. history until they were both surpassed by the April 1999 Columbine High School massacre.

== Background ==
Lindhurst High School, where the shooting occurred, has a multiethnic student body, mostly from poor and working-class backgrounds.

== Shooting and hostage ==
Houston arrived on campus armed with a 12-gauge pump-action shotgun and a sawed-off .22 caliber rifle around 2:40 p.m. on May 1. As he entered the school, he fatally shot teacher Robert Brens, his civics teacher during his senior year. He shot and killed Judy Davis, a 17-year-old student in Brens' classroom. Houston then walked through the hallway outside the classroom and fatally shot student Jason Edward White in the chest. Further on, Houston pointed his shotgun at another student, Angela Welch. Still, before he could fire his weapon, another student, 16-year-old Beamon Aton Hill, pushed her to safety, taking a single fatal bullet to the side of his head. The gunfire injured 10 others.

Houston then entered a classroom with about 25 to 30 students inside. According to reports, Houston would send student Andrew Parks to retrieve more hostages, threatening that if he did not come back, he would kill another student and eventually held over 80 students hostage. He engaged in an eight-hour standoff with police before surrendering to authorities.

== Aftermath ==
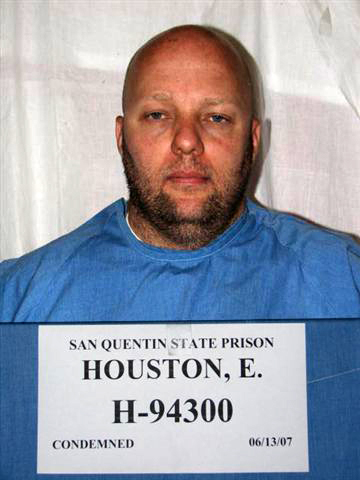
Houston in 2007.

While in police custody, Houston stated that he was despondent over losing his job and was angered that he failed to graduate from high school or obtain a GED. He claimed to be "out of touch with reality" when he committed the murders. He also confessed to holding a grudge against his former Civics teacher Robert Brens, who failed Houston in his class. On September 21, 1993, Houston was found guilty of all charges against him and was sentenced to death. In 2012, the California Supreme Court upheld his death sentence. He was awaiting execution at San Quentin State Prison but was moved to Pelican Bay State Prison in March 2024. Houston also denied allegations that he had warned the school about coming on campus. His statements were introduced as evidence in both the civil and criminal trials.

A memorial park was erected on McGowan Parkway in Olivehurst, California, in remembrance of the four people who died that day.

== Film ==
Detention: The Siege at Johnson High (a.k.a. Hostage High and Target for Rage) is a 1997 film based on the Lindhurst High School shooting. The television series Hostage Do or Die also produced an episode recreating the events of the shooting and standoff. The episode aired on December 29, 2011.

== See also ==
- List of homicides in California
- List of school shootings in the United States by death toll
- List of school shootings in the United States (before 2000)
