= One Hot Summer Night =

- Written by: Michael O'Hara
- Directed by: James A. Contner
- Starring: Erika Eleniak; Brian Wimmer; Tobin Bell; Barry Bostwick
- Music by: Stacy Widelitz
- Country of origin: United States
- Original language: English

Production
- Producer: Tracey Jeffrey
- Cinematography: Peter Benison
- Editor: Thomas Fries
- Running time: 100 minutes
- Production company: O'Hara-Horowitz Productions

Original release
- Network: ABC
- Release: March 12, 1998

One Hot Summer Night (AKA "The Trophy Wife's Secret") is a 1998 television movie with Erika Eleniak, Brian Wimmer, Tobin Bell, and Barry Bostwick. The film was directed by James A. Contner.

== Plot ==
Art Brooks and Kelly Moore are a couple who get married. But Kelly realizes that Art is an alcoholic, and he beats her. She starts a relationship with the lawyer Richard Linsky. Art is then found dead, with Richard being convicted and imprisoned.

== Cast ==
- Barry Bostwick as Art Brooks
- Erika Eleniak as Kelly Moore Brooks
- Brian Wimmer as Richard Linsky
- Tobin Bell as Vincent "Coupe" De Ville
- Stephen Macht as Abel Ganz
- Anne De Salvo as District Attorney Pina
- Lochlyn Munro as Detective Eddie Beltran
- Christopher Darden as Detective Mingus
- Alannah Ong as Lisa
- Corrie Clark as Jenna Brooks
- Ken Roberts as Gene Walsh
- Jerry Wasserman as Judge Block
- John Taylor as Minister
- Maria Herrera as Clerk
