= Twilight Zone: Rod Serling's Lost Classics =

- Film poster
- Genre: Horror; Fantasy; Supernatural
- Written by: Rod Serling; Richard Matheson
- Directed by: Robert Markowitz
- Starring: Amy Irving; Gary Cole; Jack Palance; Patrick Bergin
- Narrated by: James Earl Jones
- Music by: Patrick Williams
- Country of origin: United States
- Original language: English

Production
- Executive producers: Michael O'Hara; Lawrence Horowitz
- Producer: S. Bryan Hickox
- Cinematography: Jacek Laskus
- Editor: David Beatty
- Running time: 89 minutes
- Production company: O'Hara-Horowitz Productions

Original release
- Network: CBS
- Release: May 19, 1994

Twilight Zone: Rod Serling's Lost Classics is a 1994 American made-for-television fantasy supernatural horror film consisting of two stories by Rod Serling. The film premiered on CBS on May 19, 1994. The film was co-produced by Serling's widow Carol Serling. Reportedly, she found the two pieces in a trunk in the family's garage.

The first and shorter segment, entitled The Theatre, was expanded and scripted by Richard Matheson from a Serling outline. It starred Gary Cole and Amy Irving.

The longer segment, Where the Dead Are, was a complete script Serling penned in 1968. Patrick Bergin and Jack Palance starred. Because it was written four years after the end of the original series, this was not originally a Twilight Zone story. The tales have thematic echoes of stories about unnaturally prolonged longevity, such as Oscar Wilde's The Picture of Dorian Gray, Edgar Allan Poe's "The Facts in the Case of M. Valdemar" and H. P. Lovecraft's "Cool Air".

James Earl Jones hosted and narrated the special. He previously worked with Serling on the 1972 film The Man.

== Plot ==
=== Introduction ===
Good evening, and welcome to a very special two hours of television. Tonight we will see, for the first time, two original dramas, created by, perhaps, television's greatest storyteller, six-time Emmy Award-winner Rod Serling, beginning with a short film about a contemporary young woman, whose life unfolds in a most unusual way. We then travel to post-Civil War Massachusetts, where Rod Serling's last unproduced screenplay comes to life. So, please sit back and join me as we journey into a wonderous land whose boundaries are that of imagination. Your next stop...The Twilight Zone!

=== The Theatre ===
==== Opening narration ====
Melissa Sanders is having difficulty completing her City Hall-commissioned sculpture. Her behavior is characteristic. She delays. She defers. She refuses to commit to decisions in both her personal and professional life. She thinks she has all the time in the world, but she does not, because that world will change forever when Melissa Sanders walks through the door of a certain movie theatre into the Twilight Zone.

==== Synopsis ====
A young woman, Melissa Sanders, goes to the theatre to see the classic film His Girl Friday. She sees scenes from her own past involving her fiancé, James. No one else can see these scenes. At first Melissa thinks it's a practical joke plotted by James, but when she returns to the theatre, she sees scenes of her future, in which she is killed by a bus on March 20. When she tells James about it, he assures her it will never happen. After it does happen, James visits the theatre and sees scenes from his own life.

==== Closing narration ====
There are films in the mind of every human being: films that replay the past and, on rare occasions, films that reveal the future, warning us in no uncertain terms that every minute is precious and we must always live our lives to the fullest. Of course, these films would only be seen if they are developed and projected from the Twilight Zone.

=== Where the Dead Are ===
==== Opening narration ====
Dr. Benjamin Ramsey is a man on a mission, said mission involving a declaration of war on an enemy that has never been defeated. The enemy is death and Dr. Ramsey will soon discover that trying to overcome it may not be the most prudent of causes, especially when the battle is waged in the Twilight Zone.

==== Synopsis ====
Three years after the American Civil War, a university professor and former Union Army surgeon, Dr. Benjamin Ramsey, performs an appendectomy on a patient named O'Neill, who dies seconds later. Ramsey notices a severe skull fracture O'Neill had endured twelve years earlier, one that no one could have survived. Ramsey travels to a mysterious island to seek answers from Dr. Jeremy Wheaton, who used to experiment with tissue regeneration. They discuss O'Neill, and Wheaton reveals that he has found a method to revive the dead; he explains that all of the apparently living people on the island were once dead. Later that night, Wheaton dies himself. The island's inhabitants, who have become accustomed to the impermanence of death, attack Ramsey, blaming him for Wheaton's inability to overcome his own death. Ramsey fends off the onslaught until morning, just as the ferry to the mainland arrives. Before leaving, he finds a note from Wheaton's niece in which she claims she also died and was revived by her uncle. Ramsey decides not to tell his university colleagues about Wheaton's discovery, because the natural order requires that all living things must die.

=== Closing narration ===
Quotation from the Bible, the Book of Ecclesiastes: "To everything, there is a season and a time for every purpose under Heaven. A time to be born, and a time to die." (Ecclesiastes, 3:1-2) To which Dr. Ramsey might add, "And death will come, despite the misguided efforts of man to delay or prevent it, even in the Twilight Zone."
