= Katie Wright =

American former actress (born 1971)

- Wright in 2026
- Born: December 25, 1971 (age 54); Kansas City, Missouri, U.S.
- Occupations: Actress, therapist
- Years active: 1993–2001
- Spouse: Hank Azaria (m. 2007)
- Children: 1

Kathryn Wright Azaria (born December 25, 1971) is an American therapist and retired actress.

== Early life ==
Kathryn Wright was born in Kansas City, Missouri on December 25, 1971.

== Career ==
Wright began her acting career in two episodes of The Wonder Years and later had leading roles in several network television films, in addition to appearing as a regular on two prime time soap operas, the short-lived Malibu Shores and the megahit Melrose Place. She has also received some film writer and director training. Wright received the Best Actress Award at the 2000 Slamdunk Film Festival for her role in Hairshirt, which she also co-produced.

Wright retired from acting in 2001 and studied to be a family therapist.

== Personal life ==
The daughter of Scott (a physician) and Mary Wright, she was born in Kansas City, Missouri, and grew up in Villanova, Pennsylvania, graduating in 1990 from Harriton High School. Wright has been married to actor/director Hank Azaria since 2007 and gave birth to a son in 2009.

== Filmography ==
=== Film ===
| Year | Film | Role | Notes |
|---|---|---|---|
| 1994 | It's Pat | Groupie | |
| 1996 | God's Lonely Man | Danielle | |
| 1996 | When Friendship Kills | Alexis 'Lexi' Archer | TV movie |
| 1996 | A Friend's Betrayal | Cindy | TV movie |
| 1996 | Abduction of Innocence | Clare Steves | TV movie |
| 1997 | Detention: The Siege at Johnson High | Samantha Eckert | TV movie |
| 1998 | Hairshirt | Corinne 'Corey' Wells | |
| 1999 | Idle Hands | Tanya | |
| 1999 | Late Last Night | Mia | TV movie |
| 2000 | The David Cassidy Story | Susan Dey | TV movie |
| 2000 | The Sculptress | Sarah | |
| 2001 | The Good Things | Christina | Short film (filmed in 1999) |

=== Television ===
| Year | Title | Role | Notes |
|---|---|---|---|
| 1993 | The Wonder Years | Jane | Episodes: "Summer", "Independence Day" |
| 1994 | Harts of the West | Lingerie Model | Episode: "Back in the Panties Again" |
| 1996 | Malibu Shores | Nina Gerard | 10 episodes |
| 1997 | Melrose Place | Chelsea Fielding | 12 episodes |
| 1997 | Boy Meets World | Debbie | Episode: "Chick Like Me" |
| 1997 | Players | Sarah Dalton | Episode: "In Concert" |
| 1999 | Cracker | Jennifer Sieger | Episode: "The Club" |
| 2000 | Walker, Texas Ranger | Cara Parkins | Episode: "Child of Hope" |
