= James A. Contner =

American film director

- Born: James Atwater Contner; June 12, 1947 (age 79)
- Other names: Jim Contner; J.A. Contner
- Occupations: Film cinematographer, television cinematographer, director and producer
- Years active: 1972–2015

James Atwater Contner (born June 12, 1947) is an American film, television director and cinematographer. His work includes episodes of such television series as Miami Vice, Angel, Buffy the Vampire Slayer, Firefly, The X-Files and Star Trek: Enterprise. He has also directed several films, including One Hot Summer Night (1998), and Shark Swarm (2008).

== Filmography ==
Director of photography

=== Film ===
Year	Film	Director	Notes
1980	Cruising	William Friedkin	Second collaboration with William Friedkin
1980	Gilda Live	Mike Nichols	
1980	Times Square	Allan Moyle	
1981	Nighthawks	Bruce Malmuth	
1981	So Fine	Andrew Bergman	
1983	Tough Enough	Richard Fleischer	
1983	Eddie Macon's Run	Jeff Kanew	
1983	Jaws 3-D	Joe Alves	
1984	Where the Boys Are '84	Hy Averback	
1984	The Flamingo Kid	Garry Marshall	
1985	The Last Dragon	Michael Schultz	
1986	Let's Get Harry	Stuart Rosenberg	
1986	Heat	Dick Richards	
1988	Monkey Shines	George A. Romero	

Camera and electrical department

Year	Film	Director	Role	Notes	Other notes
1972	A Place Called Today	Don Schain	First assistant camera	First collaboration with Don Schain	
1972	Across 110th Street	Barry Shear	Assistant camera		Uncredited
1973	Girls Are for Loving	Don Schain	First camera assistant	Second collaboration with Don Schain	
1973	Cops and Robbers	Aram Avakian	Assistant camera		
1974	Crazy Joe	Carlo Lizzani	Camera assistant		
1974	Claudine	John Berry	Assistant camera		
1975	Jaws	Steven Spielberg	Assistant camera		Uncredited
1976	The Next Man	Richard C. Sarafian	Camera operator		
1978	The Wiz	Sidney Lumet	Camera operator	First collaboration with Sidney Lumet	
1978	The Brink's Job	William Friedkin	Additional photography	First collaboration with William Friedkin	
1978	Superman	Richard Donner	Camera operator: USA		
1979	All That Jazz	Bob Fosse	Camera operator		
1980	Just Tell Me What You Want	Sidney Lumet	Camera operator	Second collaboration with Sidney Lumet	
1980	It's My Turn	Claudia Weill	Camera operator: New York		
1981	On Golden Pond	Mark Rydell	Camera operator		
1985	Remo Williams: The Adventure Begins	Guy Hamilton	Director of photography: Second unit, New York		
2015	Ithaca	Meg Ryan	Camera operator: Second unit		

=== Documentaries ===
Camera and electrical department

Year	Film	Director	Role	Notes
1980	Rockshow	Jack Priestley	Cameraman	Concert film

=== Shorts ===
Director of photography

=== Film ===
Year	Film	Director
2014	The City	Laura Ruschak
2015	Bank Robbers & Robbers	Greg Golter

=== TV documentaries ===
Camera and electrical department

Year	Film	Director	Role
1979	Wings Over the World	Jack Priestley	Cameraman: Concert performance

=== TV movies ===
Camera and electrical department

Year	Film	Director	Role
2013	Killing Lincoln	Adrian Moat	"B" camera operator
2013	Killing Kennedy	Nelson McCormick	Camera operator: "C" camera

Director

Year	Film
1990	Hitler's Daughter
1991	The Ten Million Dollar Getaway
1991	The Return of Eliot Ness
1993	The Cover Girl Murders
1996	When Friendship Kills
1996	She Woke Up Pregnant
1996	Abduction of Innocence
1997	Touched by Evil
1998	Playing to Win: A Moment of Truth Movie
1998	One Hot Summer Night
1998	Shattered Hearts: A Moment of Truth Movie
2005	Jane Doe: Vanishing Act
2005	McBride: Anybody Here Murder Marty?
2007	Jane Doe: Ties That Bind
2007	Jane Doe: How to Fire Your Boss
2007	You've Got a Friend
2008	Shark Swarm
2008	Ladies of the House

Producer

Year	Film	Director	Role
1996	Abduction of Innocence	Himself	Supervising producer
1998	Playing to Win: A Moment of Truth Movie	Himself	Co-executive producer
1998	One Hot Summer Night	Himself	Co-executive producer
1998	Shattered Hearts: A Moment of Truth Movie	Himself	Co-executive producer

=== TV series ===
Year	Title	Notes
1985	Miami Vice	11 episodes
1986−87	Crime Story	10 episodes

Camera and electrical department

Year	Title	Role	Notes
1975−76	Movin' On	Camera operator	10 episodes
1984	Paper Dolls	Cinematographer: New York shoot	6 episodes
2014	Turn: Washington's Spies	Camera operator: "B" camera	6 episodes
2016	Mercy Street	Camera operator: "B" camera	6 episodes

Director

Year	Title	Notes
1987	Crime Story	1 episode
1988	The Equalizer	3 episodes
1989	Miami Vice	1 episode
1989	Unsub	1 episode
1989	Hard Time on Planet Earth	1 episode
1989	The Young Riders	1 episode
1989	Island Son	1 episode
1988−89	21 Jump Street	4 episodes
1990	Tour of Duty	1 episode
1990	Max Monroe: Loose Cannon	1 episode
1989−90	Wiseguy	4 episodes
1990−91	Midnight Caller	3 episodes
1991	Gabriel's Fire	1 episode
1991	The Flash	1 episode
1991	Palace Guard	1 episode
1992	Mann & Machine	1 episode
1992	Raven	1 episode
1993	I'll Fly Away	1 episode
1993	Key West	1 episode
1993	The Adventures of Brisco County, Jr.	1 episode
1993	Lois & Clark: The New Adventures of Superman	1 episode
1991−93	Reasonable Doubts	2 episodes
1994	seaQuest 2032	1 episode
1994	Hawkeye	1 episode
1995	New York Undercover	1 episode
1995	The Commish	2 episodes
1995	The Wright Verdicts	1 episode
1995	The X-Files	1 episode
1995	Hercules: The Legendary Journeys	1 episode
1995	American Gothic	1 episode
1996	Fortune Hunter	1 episode
1991−96	Sisters	15 episodes
1997	Dark Skies	2 episodes
1997	Pensacola: Wings of Gold	1 episode
1998	Prey	1 episode
1998	Push	1 episode
1998	V.I.P.	1 episode
2000	Roswell	2 episodes
2000−01	The Invisible Man	2 episodes
2001	Dark Angel	1 episode
2001	Smallville	1 episode
2002	The Dead Zone	1 episode
2002	Firefly	1 episode
1998−2003	Buffy the Vampire Slayer	20 episodes
2002−03	Star Trek: Enterprise	5 episodes
1998−2004	Charmed	4 episodes
1999−2004	Angel	13 episodes
2004	The Division	1 episode
2005	Las Vegas	1 episode
2005	Point Pleasant	1 episode
2005	The Inside	1 episode
2005	Killer Instinct	2 episodes
2006	In Justice	1 episode
2007	The Dresden Files	1 episode
2009	Dollhouse	1 episode

Producer

Year	Title	Role	Notes
1999−2003	Buffy the Vampire Slayer	Co-producer	16 episodes
1999−2004	Angel	Co-producer	13 episodes
