= Hairshirt (film) =

Hairshirt (aka Too Smooth)
- film poster
- Directed by: Dean Paras
- Written by: Dean Paras
- Story by: Dean Paras; Nate Tuck; Katie Wright
- Produced by: Dean Paras; Neve Campbell; Christian Campbell
- Starring: Dean Paras; Neve Campbell; Katie Wright; Rebecca Gayheart; Stefan Brogren
- Cinematography: Igor Jadue-Lillo
- Edited by: John Axelrad; Samuel Craven; Dean Paras
- Music by: Nathan Barr
- Production company: Lunatic Productions
- Distributed by: TriStar Pictures
- Release date: September 13, 1998 (TIFF)
- Running time: 89 minutes
- Country: United States
- Language: English

Hairshirt (released to home video as Too Smooth) is a 1998 romantic comedy film starring Dean Paras, Neve Campbell, Katie Wright, Rebecca Gayheart and Stefan Brogren.

== Plot ==
Danny Reilly (Dean Paras) is a self-obsessed man who, after dumping Renee Weber (Neve Campbell), falls in love again with Corey Wells (Katie Wright). But Renee makes it her mission to see that Danny never falls in love again and sets out for attack when he falls for Corey.

== Cast ==
- Dean Paras as Danny Reilly
- Neve Campbell as Renee Weber
- Katie Wright as Corrinne "Corey" Wells
- Rebecca Gayheart as Jennifer Scott
- Stefan Brogren as Timothy "Tim" Wright
- David DeLuise as Peter Angelo
- Adam Carolla as Bruce Greenberg
- Christian Campbell as Adam Lipton
- Adam Scott as Bar Fan
- Marley Shelton as Hot Blonde
- Dax Sheppard as Party Vomiter
- Ele Keats as Slapping Girl
- Alfonso Cuaron as Director
- Pablo Cruz Guerrero as Check-out Guy in Market
