= Michael O'Hara (writer) =

American screenwriter

Michael J. O’Hara is an American author, screenwriter and producer.

== Early life ==
O’Hara was born in New York City and raised in the Inwood section of Northern Manhattan. He graduated with a B.A. in English and Government from Manhattan College.

== Career ==
After college, O’Hara worked as a political reporter for two Gannett newspapers (The Titusville Star Advocate and Cocoa Today).

He moved to Hollywood in the late 1970s and ended up working in the press department at NBC, becoming NBC's V.P. of West Coast Publicity and, later, an executive producer and screenwriter.

His first novel, Dos Angeles, was published in the fall of 2015.

== Filmography ==
=== Writer ===
==== Television series ====
1. Chicago Story: Not Quite Paradise: Part 1 - 1982
2. Chicago Story: Not Quite Paradise: Part 2 - 1982
3. Murder in the Heartland (Mini-Series) - 1993

==== Television Movies ====
1. Those She Left Behind - 1989
2. She Said No - 1990
3. Switched at Birth - 1991
4. She Woke Up Pregnant - 1996
5. One Hot Summer Night - 1998
6. In His Life: The John Lennon Story - 2000
7. 1st to Die - 2003

=== Executive producer ===
==== Television series ====
1. Murder in the Heartland - 1993

==== Television Movies ====
1. She Said No - 1990
2. Switched at Birth - 1991
3. Bloodlines: Murder in the Family - 1993
4. Moment of Truth: Stalking Back - 1993
5. Moment of Truth: To Walk Again - 1994
6. Moment of Truth: Broken Pledges - 1994
7. Moment of Truth: Cradle of Conspiracy - 1994
8. Heart of a Child - 1994
9. Twilight Zone: Rod Serling's Lost Classics - 1994
10. Moment of Truth: Caught in the Crossfire - 1994
11. Moment of Truth: Cult Rescue - 1994
12. The Other Mother: A Moment of Truth Movie - 1995
13. Deceived by Trust: A Moment of Truth Movie - 1995
14. Eye of the Stalker - 1995
15. Justice for Annie: A Moment of Truth Movie - 1996
16. A Secret Between Friends: A Moment of Truth Movie - 1996
17. She Woke Up Pregnant - 1996
18. Abduction of Innocence - 1996
19. Badge of Betrayal - 1997
20. A Child's Wish - 1997
21. Moment of Truth: Into the Arms of Danger - 1997
22. The Accident: A Moment of Truth Movie - 1997
23. Shattered Hearts: A Moment of Truth Movie - 1998
24. I Know What You Did - 1998
25. Playing to Win: A Moment of Truth Movie - 1998
26. One Hot Summer Night - 1998
27. Nobody Lives Forever - 1998
28. Broken Silence: A Moment of Truth Movie - 1998
29. Someone to Love Me - 1998
30. In His Life: The John Lennon Story - 2000
31. 1st to Die - 2003

== Awards ==
Besides an Emmy nomination ("Switched at Birth"), other honors include: a Christopher Award (“A Child’s Wish”); a Prism Award (“The Accident”); and the Media Award from The National Council on Problem Gambling (“Playing to Win.”)

== Personal life ==
O’Hara and his wife Doris live in Malibu, California. They have two children, Mariah and John.
