= Jomo Fray =

American cinematographer

- Education: Brown University; New York University Tisch School of the Arts (MFA)
- Occupation: Cinematographer
- Years active: 2013-present

Jomo Fray is an American cinematographer. He is best known for his work on Nickel Boys (2024), for which he won an Independent Spirit Award for Best Cinematography. He is also known for his work on Port Authority (2019), Selah and the Spades (2020) and All Dirt Roads Taste of Salt (2023).

He was featured as one of the 2018 "25 New Faces of Independent Film" by Filmmaker and as one of the 2022 "Rising Stars of Cinematography" by American Cinematographer.

== Early life and education ==
Fray attended Brown University, majoring in political theory and Africana studies, and received a Master of Fine Arts from New York University Tisch School of the Arts.

== Career ==
Fray has served as cinematographer on Port Authority directed by Danielle Lessovitz, Selah and the Spades and The Young Wife by Tayarisha Poe.

In 2023, Fray served as cinematographer on All Dirt Roads Taste of Salt directed by Raven Jackson, for which he received nominations for Independent Spirit Award for Best Cinematography and won the Black Reel Award for Outstanding Cinematography.

In 2024, Fray served as cinematographer on Nickel Boys directed by RaMell Ross, where he won the Independent Spirit Award for Best Cinematography, and the New York Film Critics Circle Award for Best Cinematographer.
