= Hearts Beat Loud =

- Theatrical release poster
- Directed by: Brett Haley
- Written by: Brett Haley; Marc Basch
- Produced by: Sam Bisbee; Houston King; Sam Slater
- Starring: Nick Offerman; Kiersey Clemons; Ted Danson; Sasha Lane; Blythe Danner; Toni Collette
- Cinematography: Eric Lin
- Edited by: Patrick Colman
- Music by: Keegan DeWitt
- Production companies: Burn Later Productions; Houston King Productions; Park Pictures
- Distributed by: Gunpowder & Sky (United States and Canada); Stage 6 Films (International; through Park Circus)
- Release dates: January 26, 2018 (Sundance); June 8, 2018 (United States)
- Running time: 97 minutes
- Country: United States
- Language: English
- Budget: $1.8 million
- Box office: $2.4 million

Hearts Beat Loud is a 2018 American musical comedy-drama film directed by Brett Haley, from a screenplay by Haley and Marc Basch. It stars Nick Offerman, Kiersey Clemons, Ted Danson, Sasha Lane, Blythe Danner and Toni Collette, and follows a Brooklyn record store owner who tries to convince his daughter to start a band with him after a song they recorded goes viral.

It had its world premiere at the 2018 Sundance Film Festival on January 26, 2018, and was released in the United States on June 8, 2018, by Gunpowder & Sky.

== Plot ==
Frank Fisher, a former musician who lost his wife in a biking accident, owns a failing vinyl shop called Red Hook Records in Brooklyn, New York. His daughter Sam is slated to leave for the West Coast to study pre-med at the end of the summer. Despite Sam's desire to study and spend time with her girlfriend Rose, Frank incessantly urges her to play music with him. Sam reveals she wrote a song titled "Hearts Beat Loud" during a jam session. They spend the night recording and mixing the entire song. Frank uploads the song to Spotify without Sam's permission and it becomes a viral success.

Frank tries to convince Sam to start a music duo, but the latter is reluctant, still determined to become a doctor. Regardless, Frank adopts an off-beat band name "We're Not a Band" from Sam's refusals. Sam secretly writes another song about her relationship with Rose called "Blink (One Million Miles)," while Frank writes "Everything Must Go" about h/is closing business. In the meantime, Frank's landlady and loyal customer, Leslie, offers a proposition to save Red Hook by remodeling it with a café to potentially lure more customers, to which Frank is stubbornly hesitant.

A talent agent approaches Frank and offers We're Not a Band a record deal. Frank is ecstatic at the opportunity, but Sam turns it down. When Frank brings up her deceased mother's possible approving view of the opportunity, Sam angrily storms out. Despondent, Frank bitterly rejects Leslie's offer to save Red Hook. Frank initiates a massive sale on the shop's final day of business and apologizes to Leslie through a voicemail. He is visited by Sam, who with a change of heart convinces Frank to play live music with her as the customers browse the shop. The duo plays "Hearts Beat Loud," "Blink (One Million Miles)", and "Everything Must Go," pleasing the onlooking, ever-growing customers, including Leslie and Rose. At summer's end, Red Hook closes and Frank accepts a job at a bar owned by his best friend, Dave. In Frank's final scene, Leslie comes into the bar, and she and Frank talk animatedly over drinks as the camera fades out of the scene. Sam moves to the West Coast to begin her studies and sings "Hearts Beat Loud" solo during an open mic event.

== Cast ==
- Nick Offerman as Francis James "Frank" Fisher, Sam's father, Marianne's son, and Dave's best friend
- Kiersey Clemons as Samantha Lee "Sam" Fisher, Frank's daughter, Marianne's granddaughter, and Rose's girlfriend
- Toni Collette as Leslie, Frank's landlady
- Sasha Lane as Rose, Sam's girlfriend
- Ted Danson as Dave, Frank's best friend
- Blythe Danner as Marianne Fisher, Frank's mother and Sam's grandmother

== Production ==
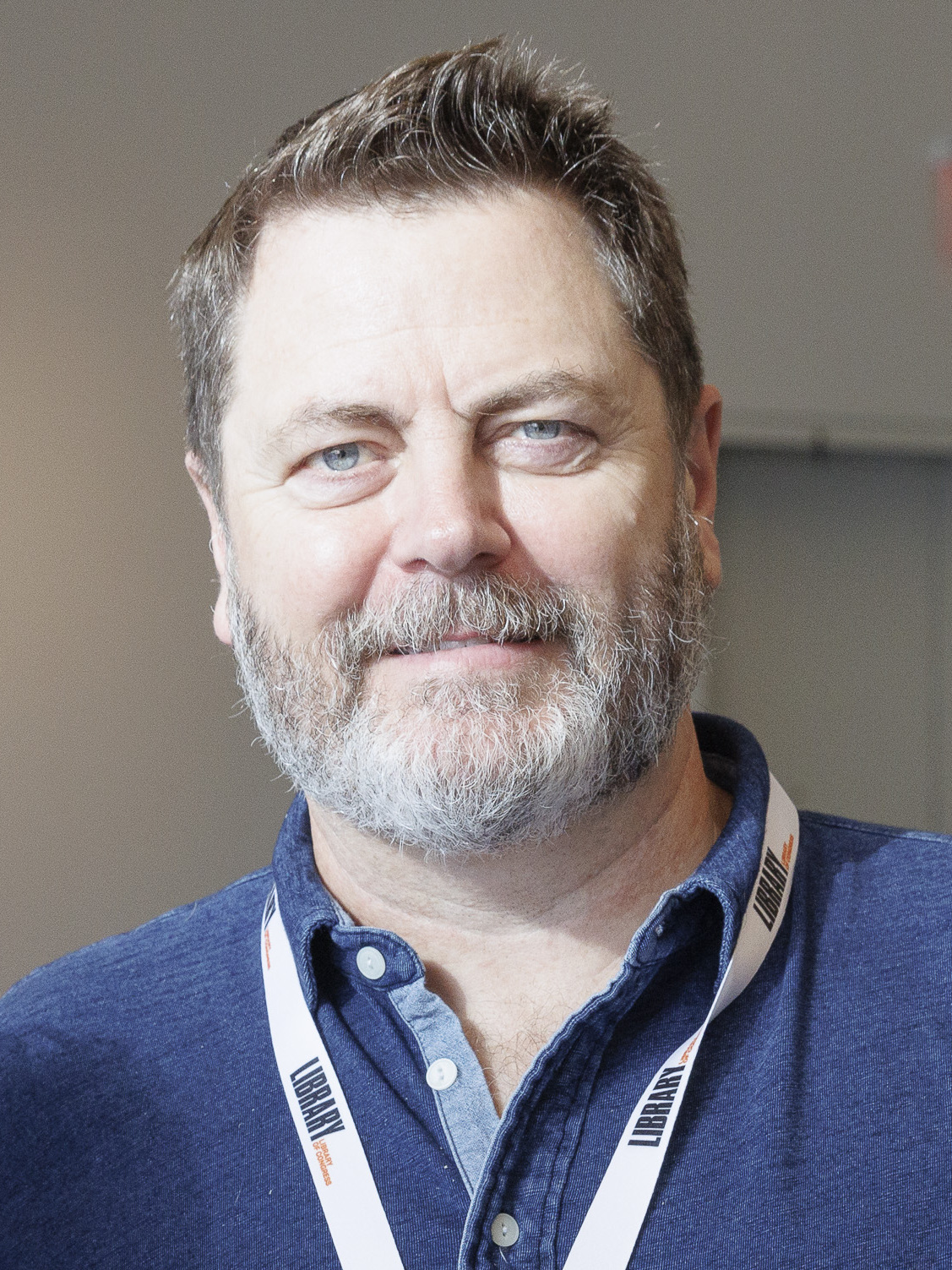
Nick Offerman
(Francis James "Frank" Fisher)

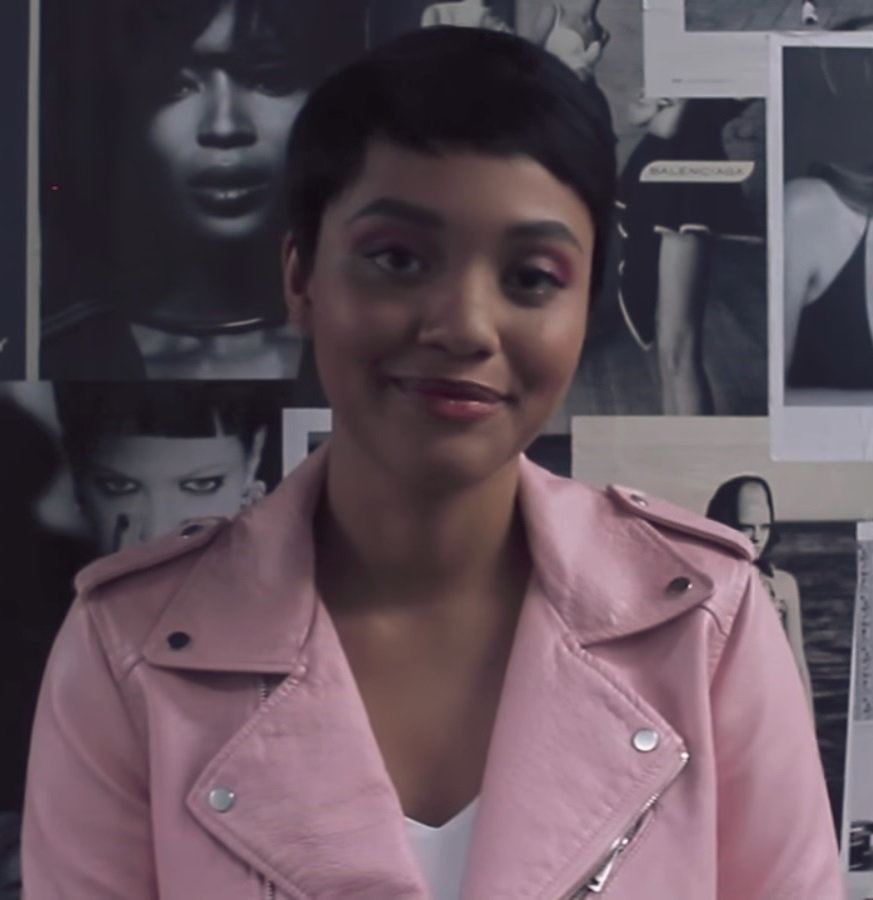
Kiersey Clemons
(Samantha Lee "Sam" Fisher)

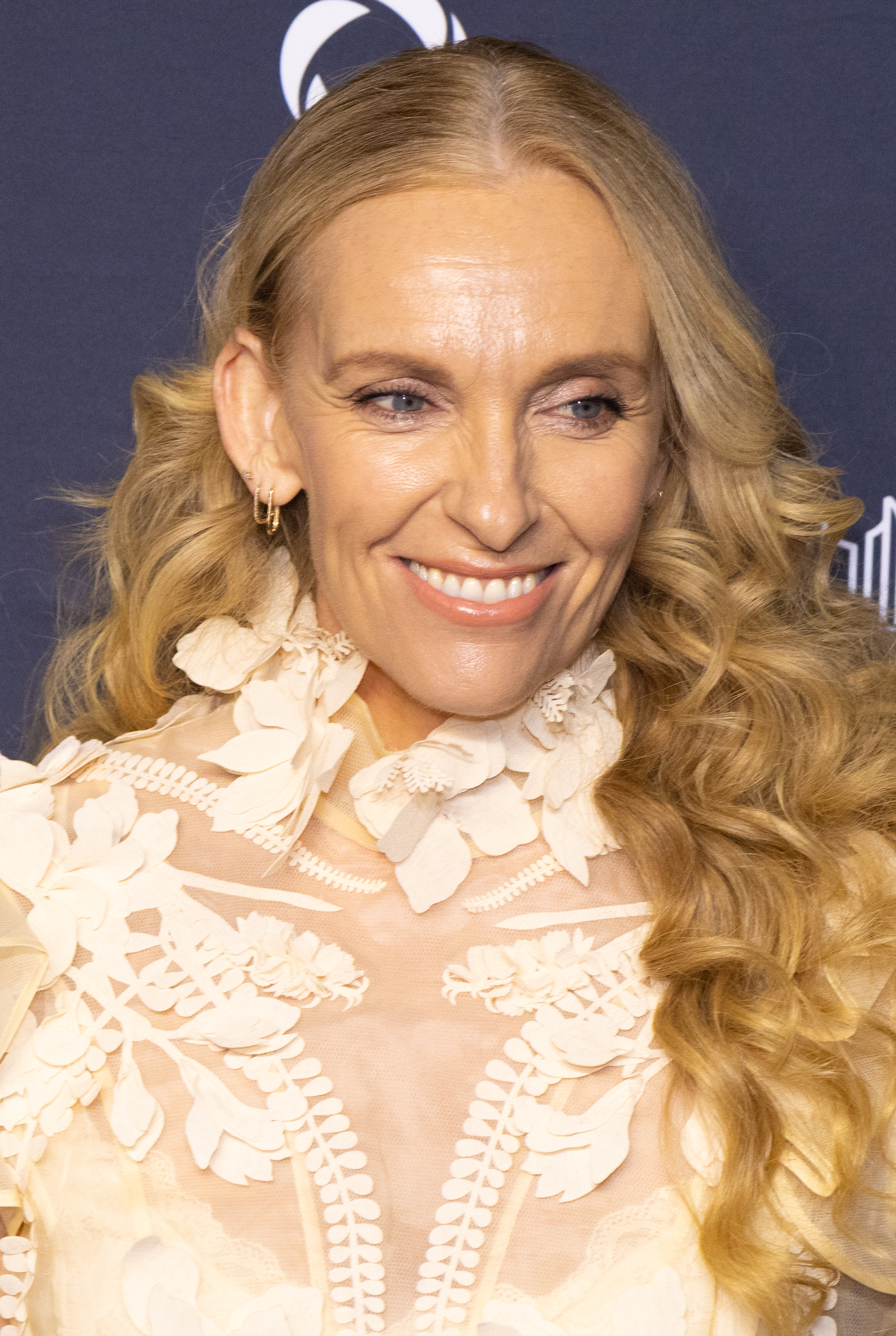
Toni Collette
(Leslie)

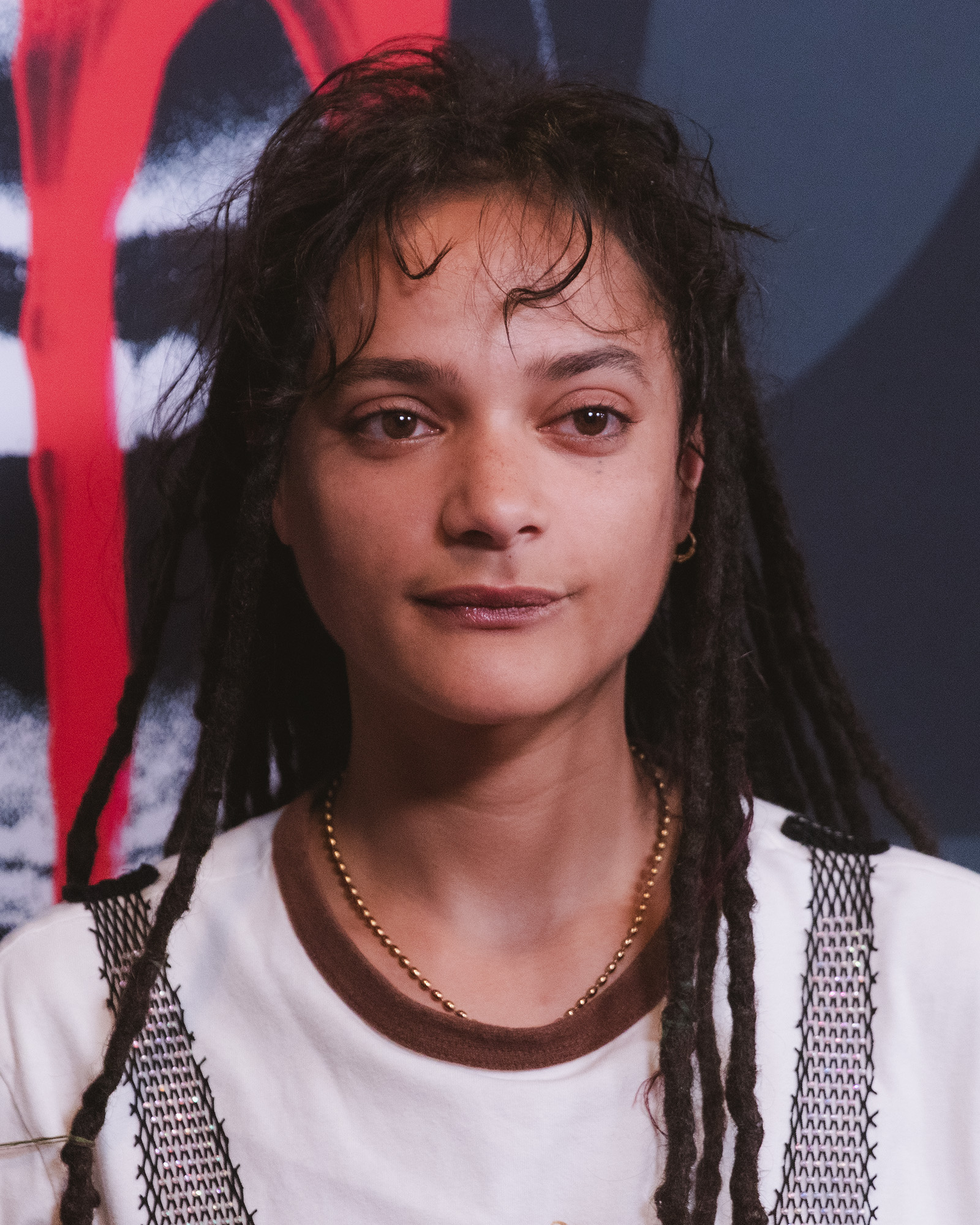
Sasha Lane
(Rose)

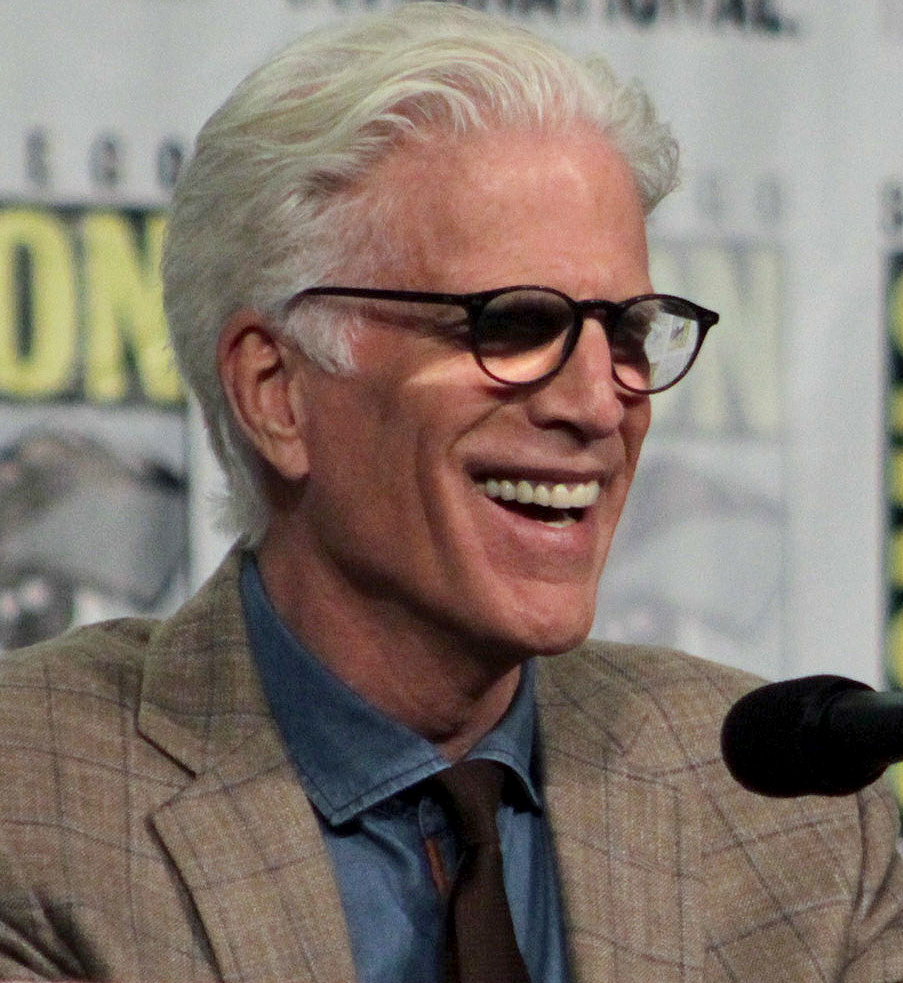
Ted Danson
(Dave)

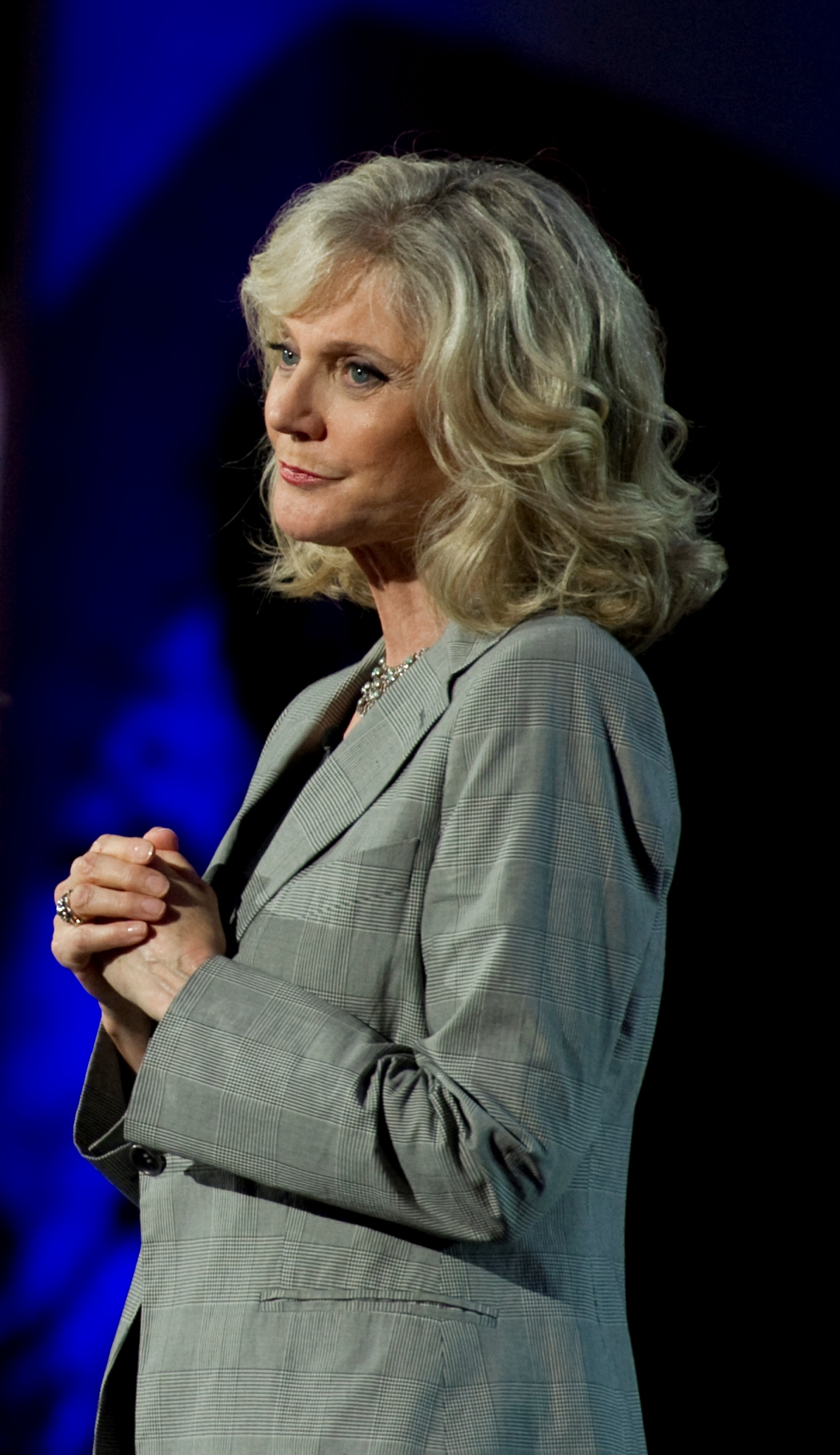
Blythe Danner
(Marianne Fisher)

In July 2017, Kiersey Clemons joined the cast of the film, with Brett Haley directing from a screenplay he co-wrote with Marc Basch. Houston King, Sam Bisbee, and Sam Slater produced the film, under their Burn Later Productions, Houston King Productions and Park Pictures banners respectively. That same month, Nick Offerman, Toni Collette, Sasha Lane, Ted Danson and Blythe Danner joined the cast of the film. Keegan DeWitt composed the film's score and all of the original songs, including the title track "Hearts Beat Loud".

Principal photography began in August 2017. It was filmed in Red Hook, Brooklyn, at locations including the coffee shop Baked and the bar Sunny's.

== Release ==
The film had its world premiere at the Sundance Film Festival on January 26, 2018. Prior to, Sony Pictures Worldwide Acquisitions and Gunpowder & Sky acquired international and North American distribution rights to the film, respectively, with the former licensing all international theatrical rights to Park Circus. It was released on June 8, 2018.

== Reception ==
On review aggregator website Rotten Tomatoes, the film has an approval rating of 92% based on 159 reviews, and an average rating of 7.2/10. The website's critical consensus reads, "Thoroughly sweet, comfortably familiar, and elevated by the chemistry between Nick Offerman and Kiersey Clemons, Hearts Beat Loud offers feel-good father-daughter drama." On Metacritic, the film has a weighted average score of 65 out of 100, based on 29 critics, indicating "generally favorable" reviews.
