= Samuel Slater (disambiguation) =

Samuel Slater (1768–1835) was an early English-American industrialist known as the "Father of the American Industrial Revolution".

Samuel Slater or Sam Slater is also the name of:

- Samuel S. Slater (1870–1916), American lawyer and politician
- Sam Slater (film producer) (fl. from 2017), American film producer, real estate developer and minority NHL and NBA team owner
