= Ruben Dawnson =

Norwegian musician from Moss

- Born: Ruben Grøndahl Utaker; 8 January 1999 (age 27); Moss, Norway
- Genres: Indie pop
- Occupations: Musician; Producer; Singer; Songwriter
- Years active: 2019–present
- Label: GEMS
- Website: rubendawnson.com

Ruben Dawnson (born Ruben Grøndahl Utaker; 8 January 1999) is a Norwegian singer-songwriter, producer, and musician from Moss, Norway. His music deals with a variety of themes including climate change, love, anxiety, and mental health, and has been featured in the HBO TV-series Genera+ion. He has released with Bergen-based Norwegian record label GEMS, since 2021.
