= Tayarisha Poe =

American writer and filmmaker

- Born: Philadelphia, Pennsylvania, U.S.
- Education: Swarthmore College (BA)
- Occupations: Writer, director
- Years active: 2014–present
- Notable work: Selah and the Spades

Tayarisha Poe is an American writer and director. Her feature directorial debut Selah and the Spades won the Best Narrative Feature Award at the 2019 BlackStar Film Festival and premiered at the 2019 Sundance Film Festival. Poe's sophomore film, The Young Wife, was released at the 2023 South by Southwest film festival.

== Life and career ==
Poe was born and raised in West Philadelphia. She graduated from the Peddie School in New Jersey and received her bachelor's degree from Swarthmore College in 2012. She initially planned to pursue a career as an attorney, but turned her interest towards filmmaking in college. Poe has named Terence Nance, Anna Rose Holmer, and Kasi Lemmons as three of her mentors.

Poe's directorial debut feature film and screenplay, Selah and the Spades, premiered at the 2019 Sundance Film Festival and was released on Amazon Prime Video in 2020. The film grew from a series of photos, short films, and prose she began posting online in 2014. Her nonlinear story received positive reception online, with director Terence Nance agreeing to executive produce the project. In 2016 she received support to develop the film through the Sundance Institute's Knight Foundation Fellowship. Selah and the Spades stars Lovie Simone, Jharrel Jerome, and Celeste O'Connor. The film received mainly positive reception.

Poe's second feature film, The Young Wife (starring Kiersey Clemons, Judith Light, Leon Bridges, Sheryl Lee Ralph, and Kelly Marie Tran), was released at South by Southwest in March 2023. The film was well-received, with critics praising the production design, the acting, and the "naturalistic" script.

== Filmography ==
=== Film ===
Year	Title	Director	Writer	Producer	Ref.
2019	Selah and the Spades	Yes	Yes	Yes	
2023	The Young Wife	Yes	Yes	Yes	

=== Television ===
Year	Title	Episode(s)
2019	Two Sentence Horror Stories	"Tutorial"
2019	Two Sentence Horror Stories	"Little Monsters"
2020	The Twilight Zone	"Among the Untrodden"
2021	Dave	"Somebody Date Me"

== Awards and nominations ==
- 2015, Filmmaker, 25 New Faces of Independent Film
- 2019, Variety, 10 Directors to Watch

Year	Award	Category	Nominated work	Result	Ref.
2019	BlackStar Film Festival	Best Narrative Feature	Selah and the Spades	Won	
2019	Palm Springs International Film Festival	Directors to Watch	Selah and the Spades	Won	
2019	Sundance Film Festival	NEXT Innovator Award	Selah and the Spades	Nominated	
2020	Indiana Film Journalists Association	Breakout of the Year	Selah and the Spades	Nominated	
2021	Las Vegas Film Critics Society Awards	Best Picture	Selah and the Spades	Nominated	
