= J. D. Dillard =

American director and screenwriter

JD Dillard
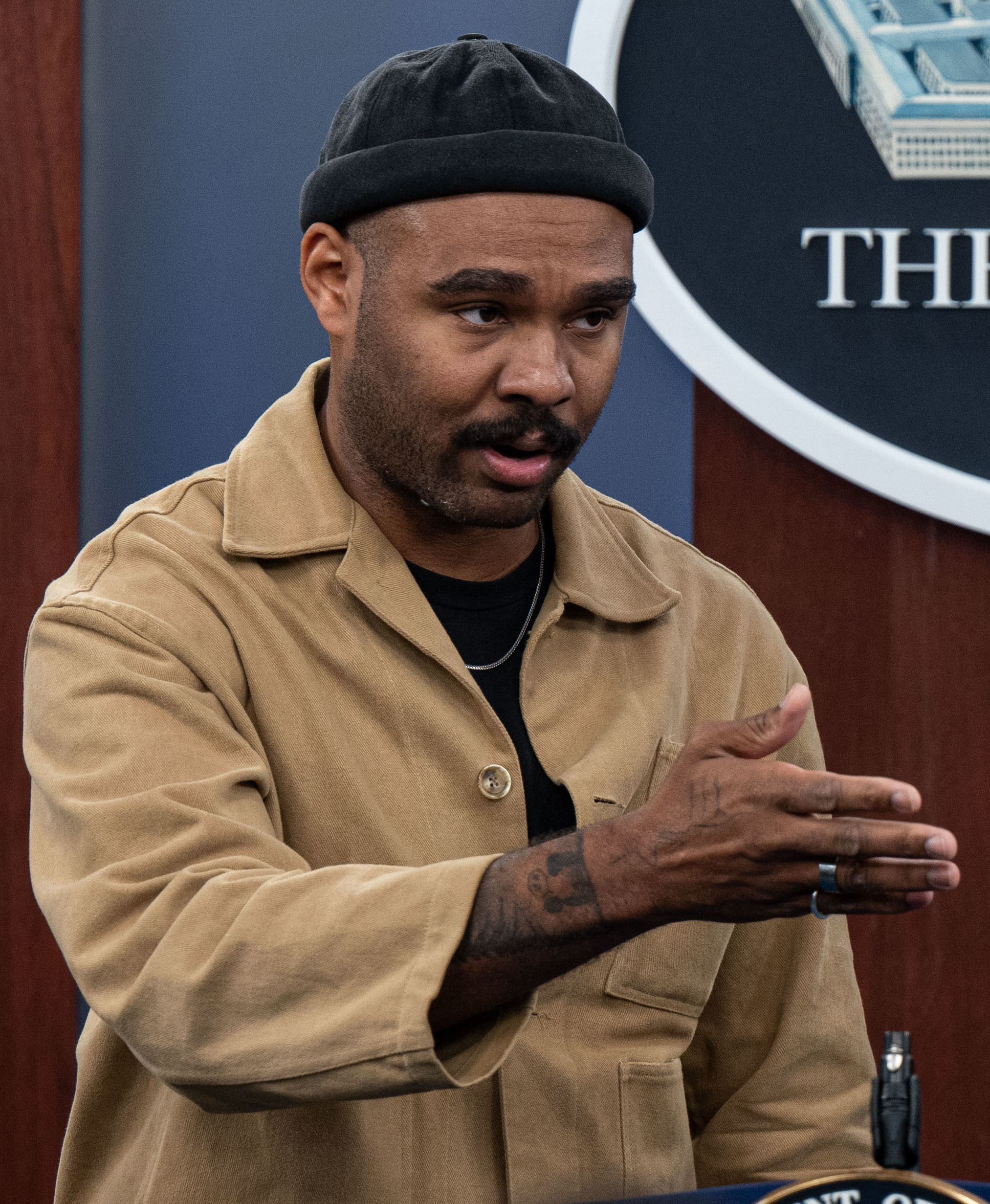
- Dillard in 2022
- Born: December 26, 1987 (age 38)
- Occupations: Film director; Producer; Screenwriter
- Years active: 2013–present
- Notable work: Sleight (2016); Sweetheart (2019); Devotion (2022)
- Parents: Bruce Dillard (father); Geri Dillard (mother)

JD Dillard (born December 26, 1987) is an American film director, producer, and screenwriter best known for his work on Sleight (2016), Sweetheart (2019), and Devotion (2022).

== Early life ==
Dillard was raised as a Navy brat, the son of Bruce and Geri Dillard. His father was a Naval flight officer and the second African-American selected to fly for the Blue Angels.

== Career ==
In March 2013, Dillard directed a trailer for Empire of the Sun's second album Ice on the Dune. In 2016, he directed the science fiction crime drama film Sleight, for Blumhouse Tilt.

In a 2017 interview with /Film, Dillard disclosed that he was in early negotiations to direct a remake of David Cronenberg's The Fly. Dillard stated that he might work with Alex Theurer, the co-writer of Sleight, on it, and that the two of them "want to start with character" when making the film.

In January 2019, he wrote and directed the horror film Sweetheart, starring Kiersey Clemons. In February 2019, Legendary Entertainment won a bidding war for Mastering Your Past, which was written by Dillard. In April 2019, he wrote the supernatural noir film Stray. In September 2019, he directed an episode of The CW series Two Sentence Horror Stories. In December 2019, he cameoed as Stormtrooper FN-1226 in Star Wars: The Rise of Skywalker.

In February 2020, it was reported that Dillard was developing an untitled Star Wars film, and was in talks to direct The Return of the Rocketeer, a sequel to the 1991 film The Rocketeer. In November 2022, Dillard announced he was not attached to either Star Wars or Rocketeer projects.

In 2020, he directed an episode of the HBO miniseries The Outsider. In June 2020, Dillard directed an episode of the CBS All Access series The Twilight Zone. In September 2020, he directed an episode of the Amazon Prime Video series Utopia.

In February 2021, he directed the action war film Devotion, starring Jonathan Majors as Jesse L. Brown. Dillard stated that his father's real-life service as a Naval flight officer partly inspired his handling of the film. During filming, Dillard's parents visited the set, and his father acted as a Navy pilot tech consultant for the film.

He served as co-creator, writer, director, and executive producer on the upcoming Apple TV series Neuromancer, based on the book of the same name. The series is set to premiere on January 22, 2027.

== Filmography ==
Film

Year	Title	Director	Producer	Writer	Ref.
2016	Sleight	Yes	No	Yes	
2019	Sweetheart	Yes	Yes	Yes	
2019	Stray	No	Yes	Yes	
2022	Devotion	Yes	Executive	No	

Television

Year	Title	Director	Executive producer	Writer	Creator	Notes	Ref.
2019	Two Sentence Horror Stories	Yes	No	No	No	Episode: "Trilogy: Guilt Trip"	
2020	The Outsider	Yes	No	No	No	Episode: "Foxhead"	
2020	The Twilight Zone	Yes	No	No	No	Episode: "Downtime"	
2020	Utopia	Yes	No	No	No	Episode: "Talking Hurts"	
2027	Neuromancer	Yes	Yes	Yes	Yes	Directed 3 episodes, wrote 4 episodes	

== Accolades ==
In January 2016, Dillard was nominated at the 2016 Sundance Film Festival Awards, in the category "Best of Next!", for his work on Sleight. In February 2018, Dillard received two nominations at the Black Reel Awards of 2018, in the categories "Best Emerging Filmmaker" and "Best First Screenplay", also for his work on Sleight.
