= Selah and the Spades =

- Official poster
- Directed by: Tayarisha Poe
- Written by: Tayarisha Poe
- Produced by: Terence Nance; Lauren McBride; Drew Houpt; Lucas Joaquin; Tayarisha Poe; Jill Ahrens
- Starring: Lovie Simone; Celeste O'Connor; Jharrel Jerome; Gina Torres; Jesse Williams; Ana Mulvoy-Ten; Evan Roe; Henry Hunter Hall
- Cinematography: Jomo Fray
- Edited by: Kate Abernathy
- Music by: Aska Matsumiya
- Production companies: Argent Pictures; Novel Pictures; Secret Engine
- Distributed by: Amazon Studios
- Release dates: January 27, 2019 (Sundance); April 17, 2020 (United States)
- Running time: 97 minutes
- Country: United States
- Language: English

Selah and the Spades is a 2019 American drama film written and directed by Tayarisha Poe in her feature directorial debut. It stars Lovie Simone, Celeste O'Connor, Jharrel Jerome, Gina Torres, and Jesse Williams. It had its world premiere at the Sundance Film Festival on January 27, 2019 and was released on April 17, 2020, by Amazon Studios.

== Plot ==
Selah Summers is a senior at the elite Haldwell Boarding School in Pennsylvania, where she leads a drug-dealing faction of students known as the Spades. Unlike the school's four other factions- the Sea, the Skins, the Bobbies, and the Prefects- the Spades have not yet nominated a candidate to replace Selah as their leader when she graduates.

As the leader of the Spades, Selah has developed a highly efficient operation with her right-hand man, Maxxie. When a new girl, Paloma, transfers to the school and photographs Selah during her Spirit Squad practice, Selah quickly recognizes her perceptiveness and talent. She tasks Paloma with taking photos of her rival Bobby (the leader of the Bobbies) cheating on her boyfriend with Two Tom (the leader of the Prefects), thrusting Paloma into the center of the factions' heated rivalry. Selah explains to Maxxie that Paloma reminds her of herself, and that she intends to begin grooming her to become the next leader of the Spades.

Tarit, the leader of the Sea, informs Selah of a possible rat within her ranks. Selah receives a call from her mother demanding she return home, where she is confronted about her failure to respond to a college acceptance letter. Her mother recounts the parable of The Scorpion and the Frog, implying that she is aware of Selah's dark nature and its need to be contained.

Back at school, Bobby confronts Selah about an incorrect drug order. After investigating, Selah discovers that Maxxie's carelessness allowed the aforementioned rat to steal the Spades' ledger. Selah interrogates the rat before pressuring Paloma into beating him.

The school's Headmaster announces that due to the recent severity of the factions' misconduct, the school prom has been cancelled. At an emergency meeting, Selah and Bobby angrily blame each other for the cancellation before Paloma suggests that they instead throw their own prom outside of the school grounds. The factions agree to work together, each facilitating a different aspect of the underground prom's setup.

In private, Bobby asks Paloma if she knows about Teela, Selah's previous protégé. She explains to Paloma that Selah drugged Teela, causing a car crash and her expulsion. When Paloma asks Selah about Teela, Selah refuses to give her a straight answer.

On their way to the prom, Selah slips pills into a bottle of alcohol and offers it to Paloma, who vomits and becomes unresponsive during the party. When Selah finds Maxxie and asks him about the potency of the pills, he quickly becomes worried. Selah and Maxxie search the forest for Paloma, who runs away from them in a daze. She stumbles over a railing on the edge of a cliff; as she manages to grab the railing, Selah and Maxxie hoist her to safety.

== Cast ==
- Lovie Simone as Selah Summers
- Celeste O'Connor as Paloma Davis
- Jharrel Jerome as Maxxie Ayoade
- Gina Torres as Maybelle Summers
- Jesse Williams as Headmaster Banton
- Ana Mulvoy-Ten as Bobby
- Evan Roe as Two Tom/Thomas Richard Thomas II
- Henry Hunter Hall as Tarit Toll Perilstein
- Francesca Noel as Amber Bolfo
- Benjamin Breault as David
- Cody Sloan as Cooper
- Rae Bell as Lulu

== Production ==
Director Tayarisha Poe stated that she was inspired to write the script because she wanted to see a film with characters that looked like her getting to experience the "unlimited potential and freedom" that she remembered feeling as a teenager. While working at an unfulfilling job, she set a goal for herself to write one scene each day. Inspired by the unconventional nature of the film La Jetée, she imagined the story of Selah being told through a variety of nonlinear media: a website of short stories, short films, music and photographs which together would tell a complete story. This project, which she called an "overture", launched online in 2014 and quickly garnered attention, including from film director Terence Nance. Eventually Poe changed direction and crafted the story into a feature film, believing that the audience's experience watching a two-hour film in a single sitting was necessary for the project to work.

Shooting for the film was originally scheduled to begin in 2015, but was postponed due to financing issues. Poe continued developing the script through the Screenwriters Lab and the Directors Lab hosted by the Sundance Institute. Poe was also selected to participate in the Sundance Institute's Catalyst Program, which helps pair filmmakers with investors. Through that process she met producer Lauren McBride and was able to pitch her idea to a room of investors, both of which led to the film being produced.

Filming took place for 25 days in the summer of 2018 on the campus of Academy at Penguin Hall in Wenham, Massachusetts. The film's director of photography, Jomo Fray, stated that the film's visual style was inspired by the album Anti by Rihanna. Handheld camera shots were increasingly used towards the end of the film to represent Selah's gradual loss of power. Blueish colors are used throughout most of the film to give it a cold feeling, but warm colors were chosen in certain moments where "something unnatural is happening or there is deep violence entering into the space". The film's creative team set different color palettes for each of the factions in the story.

== Release ==
Selah and the Spades had its world premiere at the Sundance Film Festival on January 27, 2019. In July 2019, Amazon Studios acquired distribution rights to the film, with plans for an original series based on the film. The film was released on Amazon Prime Video on April 17, 2020.

Because the online premiere happened during the confinement period of the COVID-19 pandemic, Amazon Studios partnered with restaurants in Los Angeles, San Francisco, Atlanta, Boston, Philadelphia, and other cities to deliver catered meals to people's homes to celebrate the online premiere. The goal was to support local businesses that were losing money during the shut-downs as well as raise money to support local charities.

== Critical reception ==
On review aggregator Rotten Tomatoes, the film holds an approval rating of 86% based on 109 reviews, with an average rating of 6.9/10. The website's critics consensus reads: "A smart, well-acted, and refreshingly messy coming-of-age story, Selah and the Spades suggests a bright future for debuting writer-director Tayarisha Poe." On Metacritic, the film has a weighted average score of 69 out of 100, based on 29 critics, indicating "generally favorable reviews".

In Rolling Stone, David Fear praised the filmmaker. "You can tell there’s a voice and vision behind Selah and the Spades, one that’s likely to come into its own after some seasoning. It might seem like faint praise to throw a 'watch this space' sign on top of what is indeed a more-than-impressive first movie. But think of how many debuts of fresh young filmmakers you’ve seen over the years, and how that initial spark eventually gifted us with careers defined by exponential level-ups. That’s how you feel watching this. 'They never take girls seriously,' Selah complains at one point. 'It’s a mistake the whole world makes.' Only an idiot would not take Poe seriously after this. You get the sense she’s just getting warmed up."

Selah and the Spades was a New York Times Critics Pick. Critic Teo Bugbee wrote that "While there is simple pleasure in watching a movie that is so precisely produced, Selah and the Spades aims to do more than look good. It is expressive, using images to make dynamic statements — student leaders on opposing sides of a table become a makeshift war council; Selah swipes her braids over her shoulder and is transformed into a figure of ultimate power."

Peter Bradshaw of The Guardian likened it to Heathers and suggested "it is an intriguing, opaque, tonally elusive story that seems weirdly unfinished."
