= AmirSaysNothing =

American rapper (born 1991)

Amir Tillard
- Also known as: AmirSaysNothing
- Born: Amir Tillard; February 23, 1991 (age 35); New York, U.S.
- Occupation: Rapper
- Years active: 2010s–present
- Label: Lakeshore

Amir Tillard (born February 23, 1991), better known by his stage name, AmirSaysNothing, is an independent American rapper who was born in New York and now resides in Los Angeles, California. His first project was the Medium Rare EP, which was released on May 19, 2015. He followed that with his first album, Employee of the Month, on September 23, 2016.

== Early life ==
AmirSaysNothing is the oldest of six children and grew up around the East Coast, including New York, the Washington metropolitan area, and Boston. Amir moved around a lot after his parents got a divorce. His father was a minister for the Nation of Islam in Harlem and a big hip-hop fan, which greatly influenced his art. He decided to call Los Angeles home when he was 18 years old because he wanted to become a professional skateboarder. Although he has now turned to music, he is still sponsored by Supra.

== Music career ==
Amir started rapping in high school and started taking it seriously at the age of 21. He dropped his first project, the Medium Rare EP, on May 19, 2015. His debut album, Employee of the Month, came a little more than a year later when it premiered on Noisey on June 24, 2016, and was released to all other streaming platforms on September 23, 2016.

Among his other musical accomplishments include having two of his songs featured on the Sleight soundtrack, which was released on Lakeshore Records on May 12, 2017. He has strong connections to Rhymesayers Entertainment and earned a writing credit on Evidence's 2018 album, Weather or Not, helping pen "What I Need". Atmosphere's Slug shouted out Amir on the duo's "Ringo" track from the 2016 album Fishing Blues.

== Discography ==
List of albums with selected details
Title	Details
Employee of the Month	Released: September 23, 2016; Format: Digital
