= Sleight =

2016 American drama film

- Theatrical release poster
- Directed by: J. D. Dillard
- Written by: J. D. Dillard; Alex Theurer
- Produced by: Eric B. Fleischman; Sean Tabibian; Alex Theurer
- Starring: Jacob Latimore; Seychelle Gabriel; Sasheer Zamata; Storm Reid; Cameron Esposito; Dulé Hill
- Cinematography: Ed Wu
- Edited by: Joel Griffen
- Music by: Charles Scott IV
- Production company: Diablo Entertainment
- Distributed by: WWE Studios; BH Tilt
- Release dates: January 23, 2016 (Sundance Film Festival); April 28, 2017 (United States)
- Running time: 89 minutes
- Country: United States
- Language: English
- Budget: $250,000
- Box office: $4 million

Sleight is a 2016 American superhero drama film about a street magician in Los Angeles, directed by J. D. Dillard, written by Dillard and Alex Theurer, and starring Jacob Latimore, Seychelle Gabriel, Dulé Hill, Storm Reid, Sasheer Zamata and Michael Villar.

The film was released on April 28, 2017, by WWE Studios and Blumhouse Tilt. It received generally positive reviews from critics and grossed $4 million worldwide, against its $250,000 budget.

== Plot ==
A young street magician named Bo Wolfe is left to care for his little sister Tina after their parents' deaths and turns to illegal activities to keep a roof over their heads.

By day, Bo performs magic tricks all over Los Angeles, with his specialty as being able to control anything metal, even float it in the air. He does this by building an electromagnet into his arm, with the negative electrode of the battery running to his thumb and the positive electrode running to his fingers. He first developed the electromagnet in high school for a science project, which earned him an engineering scholarship but he had to turn it down in order to take care of Tina after his mother died.

By night, he sells drugs to pay the bills, seeing it as steady work with his supplier Angelo usually being a nice guy. However, things get ugly when a new kingpin comes in and starts selling drugs cheaper on their turf. Angelo has Bo find this kingpin, so Bo uses his pickpocketing skills as a magician when he goes to a club, managed by Bo's friend Luna, where the new kingpin has his dealers selling.

Bo asks one of the dealers for drugs and pickpockets his phone to look up his call history, and finds out that his supplier's name is Maurice. Angelo finds where Maurice lives, invades his house with Bo and forces Bo to chop off his hand.

Bo then gets in too deep when he tries to skim $15,000 off the money he makes from drug dealing so he and Tina can leave town. When Angelo finds out, he threatens to kill Bo unless he can come up with $45,000 in one week. Bo finds the money, but has to steal the last $9,000 from Luna by watching her unlock the safe when she invites him up to the main office; he pickpockets the office keys as they leave. He waits to have one last drink with Luna, feeling guilty for having stolen from her, yet relieved he may make it out of his predicament alive.

However, Maurice's gang is at the club at the same time. When they spot him, they knock him out, handcuff him and put him in the trunk of a car. Bo manages to escape by using his electromagnet to lift the latches on the handcuffs and trunk, but Maurice stole all his money.

When Tina is kidnapped by Angelo as ransom, he gets back in touch with his old high school science teacher to get more power to his electromagnet. The teacher has an idea to add a feedback oscillator, but warns that it may cause the wires in his arm to overheat.

Bo then goes to Angelo's house with the supplemented electromagnet to find out where Tina is, where he rips out one of his ex-co-worker's gold teeth, hits the other with his own aluminum bat and then sends it flying into the wall. When Angelo goes to shoot him, he stops the bullets and causes the lights to flicker. He then drops the bullets to the floor, picks one up and slowly burrows it into Angelo's forehead to force him to divulge Tina's whereabouts. After Angelo tells Bo that she is with his aunt, he releases the bullet from Angelo and gives him $15,000 before leaving.

Bo goes to pick her up with his arm burnt and they start a new life with Bo's girlfriend Holly in San Diego. As they are getting accustomed to their life, Bo still does street magic as his arm has now healed and Holly walks in on him in the bathroom late at night developing a new trick after waking up to all the lights in the house flickering.

== Cast ==
- Jacob Latimore as Bashir "Bo" Wolfe
- Seychelle Gabriel as Holly
- Dulé Hill as Angelo
- Storm Reid as Tina Wolfe
- Sasheer Zamata as Georgi
- Michael Villar as Packy
- Brandon Johnson as Ramone
- Cameron Esposito as Luna
- Phil Lewis as mob boss
- Mane Rich Andrew as Maurice
- Frank Clem as Mr. Granger
- Alex Hyner as Noah

== Release ==
The film premiered at the 2016 Sundance Film Festival on January 23, 2016. On January 28, 2016, WWE Studios and BH Tilt acquired distribution rights to the film. The film was released on April 28, 2017, by WWE Studios and BH Tilt.

=== Box office ===
In North America, Sleight was released alongside How to Be a Latin Lover, Baahubali 2: The Conclusion and The Circle, and was projected to gross $1–2 million from 565 theaters in its opening weekend. It ended up debuting to $1.7 million (a per-theater average of $3,012), finishing 14th at the box office.

=== Critical response ===
On review aggregator Rotten Tomatoes, the film has an approval rating of 83% based on 42 reviews. The site's critical consensus reads, "Sleight subverts genre norms, delivering a smart and well-acted – if ultimately somewhat frustrating – magical mystery." On Metacritic, the film has a score 62 out of 100 based on reviews from 18 critics, indicating "generally favorable reviews".

== Soundtrack ==
The Sleight soundtrack was put out by Lakeshore Records on May 12, 2017. It contains 28 tracks by various artists, showcasing the original score by Charles Scott IV and including music by Thugli, Georgi Kay, Julien Jabre, Kid Ikarus and AmirSaysNothing.

== See also ==
- List of black films of the 2010s
