= Two Sentence Horror Stories =

American anthology horror television series

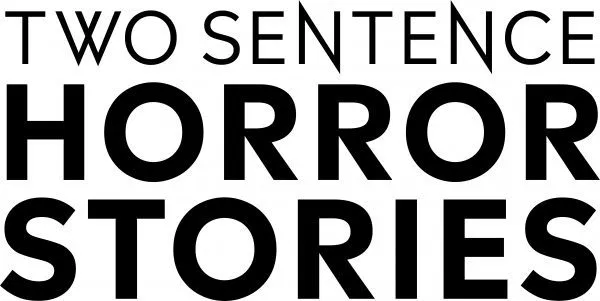
- Genre: Horror; Anthology
- Created by: Vera Miao
- Directed by: Vera Miao; Rania Attieh; Daniel Garcia; Kailey Spear; Sam Spear; J. D. Dillard; Natalia Iyudin; Tayarisha Poe; Chase Joynt; Bola Ogun; Ryan Spindell; Nikyatu Jusu; Heidi Saman
- Composers: Morgan Kibby; Brittany Allen
- Country of origin: United States
- Original language: English
- No. of seasons: 3
- No. of episodes: 29

Production
- Executive producers: Vera Miao; Elizabeth Levine; Lisa Morales; Emily Wiedemann; Chazz Carfora
- Production company: Stage 13

Original release
- Network: The CW
- Release: August 8, 2019 – February 20, 2022

Two Sentence Horror Stories is an American anthology horror television series created by Vera Miao for The CW.

The show ran for three seasons, airing between August 2019 and February 2022.

This series began its life as a low-budget digital series in 2017, before the concept was picked up by The CW and produced as a network television show.

== Premise ==
Inspired by online microfiction, specifically the r/twosentencehorror subreddit, Two Sentence Horror Stories is a psychological horror anthology series, featuring a different subgenre of horror in each episode. Designed to subvert classic horror tropes by centering on everyday people and diverse perspectives, the half-hour series provides social commentary on cultural topics.

The show consists of 20-minute, self-contained episodes. Each episode opens with the first sentence of the two-sentence story that inspired it. The final sentence is not revealed until that episode's conclusion.

== Production ==
=== Digital series ===
The inception of the show began when writer/director Vera Miao pitched Two Sentence Horror Stories to the Warner Bros. subsidiary Stage 13.

Based on this pitch, the executives at Stage 13 greenlit the short-form, anthology web series to be made on a low-budget and distributed through the Verizon owned streaming service go90.

In a 2017 interview with NBC News, Miao recounted, "I pitched an anthology series inspired by two sentence horror stories that would grapple with contemporary social issues, and reflect the diversity of today's audiences. The folks at Stage 13 responded to the idea immediately."

The concept was to draw inspiration from the literary format of a horror story told in only two sentences, that had been popularised by the Reddit thread r/TwoSentenceHorror. Although the posts by the reddit community served as inspiration, the two-sentence stories and the screenplays adapted from them were original works of writing by Miao.

Principal photography of five, fifteen-minute episodes took place in 2016 in Los Angeles, California, under the production model of ‘New Media’.

The episodes were directed by then up-and-coming filmmakers Vera Miao, J. D. Dillard, Ryan Spindell, and Danny Perez.

The series was received positively, with a limited festival run of selected episodes, before the full series was released online through go90 in 2017.

In 2018 the merger of Verizon-owned companies Yahoo! and AOL into the subsidiary Oath led to the eventual shutdown of go90. The digital series of Two Sentence Horror Stories then became unavailable to stream.

The series won in the "Action or Sci-Fi" category at the 8th Streamy Awards in October 2018.

=== Move to The CW ===
In 2018, after the shutdown of go90, Two Sentence Horror Stories found a new home, through the online streaming platform CW Seed, a spin-off of The CW television network that focused on short-form digital media.

Following its CW Seed release, the response to the show was strong enough for The CW network to strike a deal with Stage 13 and Miao to create a new version of the show for network television.

The production was quickly greenlit and shooting began in 2019.

=== Season 1 ===
The first season of the network TV version of Two Sentence Horror Stories was shot in New York City in early 2019. The CW commissioned eight original episodes, within a half-hour format.

In addition to Miao returning to direct two episodes, the directors hired to work upon this season consisted of Nikyatu Jusu, Tayarisha Poe, Natalia Iyudin, and directing duo Rania Attieh and Daniel Garcia.

For the season finale on September 19, 2019, The CW released an hour long episode titled ‘Trilogy’. This episode contained three episodes from the original, digital series version of Two Sentence Horror Stories: ‘Ma’, ‘Guilt Trip’ and ‘Singularity’.

After its final episode aired, Two Sentence Horror Stories had its USA streaming debut on Netflix.

=== Season 2 ===
In March 2020, the COVID-19 pandemic shut down the entertainment industry. However, in May, as productions slowly started to navigate the complications of filming during the pandemic lock-down, Deadline Hollywood announced that a second season of Two Sentence Horror Stories had been ordered. The show had now been expanded to a season of ten original episodes.

The production had relocated to Vancouver, British Columbia, where a large number of shows from The CW were being made, and production was now under the leadership of Executive Producer Liz Levine

Due to the move abroad, and the restrictions on international travel, few crew members from season one were able to return for season 2. The only returning directors were Rania Attieh & Daniel Garcia, who co-directed two episodes. The new directors brought aboard for the season were: Chase Joynt, Kimani Ray Smith, Bola Ogun, Jen Liao, Lynne Stopkewich and directing duo Kailey Spear & Sam Spear

Only two weeks into pre-production on season 2, it was announced that the show had been renewed for a third season by The CW.

Despite the difficulties of shooting during a global pandemic on a low budget, Levine reported to IndieWire in January 2021 that Season 2 had completed production without a single member of the cast or crew testing positive for COVID-19.

=== Season 3 ===
Production began on season 3 in 2021. Though the majority of the creative team from season 2 returned, in March Deadline Hollywood announced that Queen Sugar writer and producer Lisa Morales would join as the new Showrunner of Two Sentence Horror Stories.

Vera Miao, the show’s original creator, returned to direct an episode; as did season 2 directors Chase Joynt and Kailey and Sam Spear. Kathleen Hepburn, Nimisha Mukerji, Albert Shin, DuBois Ashong, Freddy Chaves Olmos and Heidi Saman were also brought aboard to direct episodes.

=== Cancellation ===
In May 2022, ahead of its impeding sale to Nexstar, The CW network canceled the majority of its scripted TV shows.

“It’s the Red Wedding at WBTV/CW today.” tweeted Julie Plec, co-creator of The Vampire Diaries

TVLine confirmed in June 2023 that Two Sentence Horror Stories had also been one of the shows canceled by The CW.

== Episodes ==
Season	Episodes	Originally released	
Season	Episodes	First released	Last released
Digital Series	5	October 3, 2017	October 31, 2017
1	9	August 8, 2019	September 19, 2019
2	10	January 12, 2021	February 16, 2021
3	10	January 16, 2022	February 20, 2022

=== Digital Series (2017) ===
No. overall	No. in season	Title	Directed by	Written by	Original release date	U.S. viewers (millions)
-	1	"Ma"	Vera Miao	Vera Miao	October 3, 2017	Not Reported
Like many traditional Chinese families, Mona still lives at home with her stern but loving Ma. When she meets cute Erica, their instant chemistry awakens something dormant inside. But Ma is not going to let her daughter go easily. Because nothing is allowed to come between a mother and daughter. Cast: Wei-Yi Lin as Mona, Mardy Ma as Ma, Ayesha Harris as Erica
-	2	"Snap"	Danny Perez	Vera Miao	October 10, 2017	Not Reported
A notoriously cruel celebrity blogger dismisses a mysterious foe as harmless - until he wakes up to a video of himself sleeping on his own phone. Cast: Sunkrish Bala as Donny Dante, Christopher Rivas as Xavier
-	3	"Guilt Trip"	J.D. Dillard	Vera Miao	October 17, 2017	Not Reported
After picking up a victim of police brutality, a Good Samaritan is forced to rethink her decision on the dark and isolated road with the stranger in her car. Cast: Hannah Barlow as Michelle, Gentry White as Jayson
-	4	"Singularity"	Vera Miao	Vera Miao	October 24, 2017	Not Reported
After a transgender biohacker implants revolutionary technology into her own body, she is terrified to discover she can tap more than just the internet. Cast: Jen Richards as Nala, Bobby Naderi as George, Will Beinbrink as Lorne
-	5	"Second Skin"	Ryan Spindell	Vera Miao	October 31, 2017	Not Reported
When a street-smart young woman accepts an invitation to a luxurious spa, she discovers just how far the powerful patrons will go to stay on the cutting edge of beauty. Cast: Nisalda Gonzalez as Luna, Carolyn Hennesy as Mare

=== Season 1 (2019) ===
No. overall	No. in season	Title	Directed by	Written by	Original release date	U.S. viewers (millions)
1	1	"Gentleman"	Natalia Iyudin	C.S. McMullen	August 8, 2019	0.60
A serial killer who targets and kills single mothers becomes obsessed and stalks one potential victim after she rejects him. Cast: Nicole Kang as Hana, Jim Parrack as Ken
2	2	"Squirm"	Vera Miao	Vera Miao	August 8, 2019	0.60
After a holiday office party, a young female office assistant wakes up in her bed with no memory at how she arrived home or who drugged her drinks, leading her sanity to slowly crack as she tries to solve this mystery. Cast: Tara Pacheco as Keisha, Sathya Sridharan as Sanjay, Christopher Shyer as Doug
3	3	"Legacy"	Vera Miao	Pornsak Pichetshote	August 15, 2019	0.48
A recently deceased Chinese-American man’s abusive ghost continues to torment his wife and family after his passing. Cast: Wai Ching Ho as Ma, Benjamin Ye as Bao Bao/Young Jin, Kimberley Wong as Angela, Fang Du as Harold, Suo Liu as Jin
4	4	"Hide"	Rania Attieh & Daniel Garcia	Leon Hendrix III & Sehaj Sethi & Stephanie Adams-Santos	August 15, 2019	0.48
A Hispanic woman hired to babysit an autistic little girl for the evening goes to great lengths to protect her charge from a home invasion involving two masked figures leading to a brutal cat-and-mouse, kill-or-be-killed situation. Cast: Greta Quispe as Araceli, Zaria Degenhardt as Gracie, Kyli Zion as 'Red', Sarah Irwin as 'Yellow'
5	5	"Scion"	Natalia Iyudin	Sehaj Sethi	August 22, 2019	0.45
A gay teenager with cancer is sent by his wealthy parents to a private clinic for treatment, only to learn that the place and staff has a sinister agenda for him. Cast: Kate Jennings as Dr. Lucie, Uly Schlesinger as Noah, Luka Kain as Isaac, Stanley Simons as Izzy
6	6	"Tutorial"	Tayarisha Poe	C.S. McMullen	August 29, 2019	0.42
Shot entirely from the point of view of multiple video and web cameras, a young video blogger finds herself stalked by an intruder in her own house. Cast: Aleyse Shannon as Karine, Guillermo Arribas as Jason, Guillian Gioiello as Shawn
7	7	"Only Child"	Nikyatu Jusu	Leon Hendrix III	September 5, 2019	0.57
An elderly Haitian woman moves in with her estranged son and his family, only to suspect that something is not quite right with the young grandson, whom the woman suspects to be possessed by a demon. Cast: Sharon Hope as Grandma Desi, Pepper Binkley as Emily, Guy Lockard as John, Jaiden Smith as Rex
8	8	"Little Monsters"	Tayarisha Poe	Vera Miao	September 12, 2019	0.55
A shapeshifting demon, whom adults cannot see, stalks three young and vulnerable children who live in a New York City low-income housing project. Cast: Mikelle Wright-Matos as Khalil, Melinda Mo as May, Vegas Chiddick as Marcus, Anissa Felix as Tania, Prudence Wright Holmes as the Demon/Old Lady, John Speredakos as the Demon/Suit Man, Dolores Fleming as the Old City Woman, Rachel Lu as May's Mother and Amorika Amoroso as Neighbor
9	9	"Trilogy"	Vera Miao	Vera Miao	September 19, 2019	0.55
9	9	"Trilogy"	J. D. Dillard	Vera Miao	September 19, 2019	0.55
9	9	"Trilogy"	Vera Miao	Vera Miao	September 19, 2019	0.55
Ma: Mona is a young, sexually repressed Chinese woman living with her invalid mother in an urban housing project who appears trapped in her life situation and who has several secrets. Guilt Trip: Michelle is a young white woman who gives a ride to a stranger, a black man named Jayson, after seeing him being brutalized by police, except that both Jayson and Michelle have a hidden agenda for each other. Singularity: Nala is a transgender hacktivist who is obsessed with the Internet as well as her unexplained dreams involving a missing child. Cast: Ma: Wei-Yi Lin as Mona, Mardy Ma as Ma, Ayesha Harris as Erica. Guilt Trip: Hannah Barlow as Michelle, Gentry White as Jayson, William Charlton as Frank, Lauri Hendler as Len. Singularity: Jen Richards as Nala, Bobby Naderi as George, Cameron Corona as Ben, Will Beinbrink as Lorne.

=== Season 2 (2021) ===
No. overall	No. in season	Title	Directed by	Written by	Original release date	U.S. viewers (millions)
11	1	"Bag Man"	Kimani Ray Smith	Vera Miao & Leon Hendrix III	January 12, 2021	0.52
A group of five very different high school students in detention on a Saturday are stalked by a demonic creature. Cast: Bzhaun Rhoden as Winton, Doralynn Mui as Zee, Keeya King as Gabbi, Hunter Dillon as Sam, M.J. Kokolis as Jax, Rob LaBelle as Principal Gallo
12	2	"Elliot"	Chase Joynt	Stephanie Adams-Santos	January 12, 2021	0.45
A transgender student is offered a magical means of standing up to his bullies by a mysterious janitor. Cast: James Goldman as Elliot, Janet Kidder as Janitor, David Lewis as Principal Meyers
13	3	"Instinct"	Kailey Spear & Sam Spear	Sehaj Sethi	January 19, 2021	0.61
A gig worker hired to paint the interior of an apartment begins to suspect that her latest employer may be a serial killer. Cast: Sunita Prasad as Anika, Tyler Johnston as Patrick, Leanne Lapp as Holly
14	4	"Imposter"	Jen Liao	Pornsak Pichetshote	January 19, 2021	0.44
The lone Asian-American employee at a hedge fund company is about to receive a major award when he finds himself stalked by a mysterious lookalike. Cast: Lou Ticzon as Charles, Emily Tennant as Jennifer, David Lennon as Bradley, Jasmine Vega as Tala, Carolyn Fe as Darna, Andrew Airlie as Arthur, Gordon Cormier as Young Charles
15	5	"Quota"	Lynne Stopkewich	Melody Cooper	January 26, 2021	0.52
On Christmas Eve, an e-commerce fulfillment warehouse center is ravaged by a mysterious virus outbreak that turns people into crazed killers. Cast: Sabryn Rock as Sarah, Marci T. House as Tina, Duncan Ollerenshaw as Doyle, Don Mike as Gus, Matty Finochio as Daniel
16	6	"Fix"	Rania Attieh & Daniel Garcia	Kristine Huntley	January 26, 2021	0.35
A young, drug-addicted, gay man visits his estranged sister, and comes to believe she may be possessed by a demon. Cast: Kevin Alves as Jackson, Nicole Muñoz as Sofia, Albert Nicholas as Reza
17	7	"Essence"	Bola Ogun	Megan Rosati	February 2, 2021	0.50
A teenage runaway beautician suspects that something strange is happening at the salon where she works. Cast: Chiara Guzzo as Mina, Christin Park as Tran, Laura Mennell as Kora, Patricia Isaac as Jessica
18	8	"El Muerto"	Rania Attieh & Daniel Garcia	Carlos Foglia & Lucy Luna	February 9, 2021	0.47
A young Latina girl is haunted by terrifying ghosts at the morgue where her mother works. Cast: Isla Sunar as Laura, Michelle Arvizu as Grace, Carlos Albornoz as Antonio
19	9	"Ibeji"	Bola Ogun	Melody Cooper & Stephanie Adams-Santos	February 16, 2021	0.44
After suffering a stroke, a Nigerian-American woman is stalked by a dark creature haunting a low-income hospice facility while her twin sister tries to figure out a way to stop it. Cast: Martyne Musau as Eneh, Nicole Nwokolo as Adaora, Devyn Dalton as Ghost, Balinder Johal as Elderly Patient, Angela Moore as Lucy
20	10	"Manifest Destiny"	Kimani Ray Smith	Ryan Harris & Migizi Pensoneau	February 16, 2021	0.37
A Native American podcaster and his girlfriend visit a Wild West reenactment town, which is soon made real by the spirit of a racist sheriff possessing the reenactors. Cast: Joel Oulette as Jeremy, Christie Burke as Rosalie, Brian Cyburt as Chad, Matreya Scarrwener as Claire, Steve Bacic as Sheriff Stone

=== Season 3 (2022) ===
No. overall	No. in season	Title	Directed by	Written by	Original release date	U.S. viewers (millions)
21	1	"Crush"	Kailey Spear & Sam Spear	Amy Do Thurlow	January 16, 2022	0.22
Living in their rubbish-filled home, elderly twin sisters Mabel and Jane are constantly at each other's throats, until a common enemy unexpectedly presents himself. Cast: Jacqueline Robbins as Mabel Laurent, Joyce Robbins as Jane Laurent, Matthew Kevin Anderson as Seth
22	2	"Plant Life"	Vera Miao	Stephanie Adams-Santos	January 16, 2022	0.25
Tech obsessed corporate worker Christian is gifted an odd plant by his boyfriend Ben. Before long, the plant is taking root in both Christian's apartment and his body. Cast: Donald Heng as Christian, Michael Ayres as Ben
23	3	"Toxic"	Chase Joynt	Liz Alper	January 23, 2022	0.19
A group of five friends' camping trip takes a tragic turn when a prank goes horribly wrong. Cast: Graham Verchere as Pete, Sam Robert Muik as Wes, Sean Depner as AJ, Patrick Lubczyk as Jeremy, Michael Taylor as Brendan, Robyn Daye Edwards as Park Guard, Nik Vasilyev as Park Guard #2
24	4	"Teatime"	Kailey Spear & Sam Spear	Stephanie Adams-Santos	January 23, 2022	0.17
Samantha is a teenage babysitter hired to look after a strange English couple's young daughter for the evening which takes a turn when Samantha quickly becomes unnerved by her latest charge's doll collection, and things get worse when the girl, Angela, tries to add her to it. Cast: Christina Orjalo as Sam, Sophia Reid-Gantzert as Angela Manderley, Matthew James Dowden as Mr. Manderley, Paula Lindberg as Mrs. Manderley, Rami Kahlon as Paj
25	5	"Teeth"	Kathleen Hepburn	Lisa Morales	January 30, 2022	0.21
Cara and Olivia are a young lesbian couple vacationing in the countryside who are harassed by hostile locals, leading to a shocking secret being exposed by Olivia. Cast: Naomi King as Cara, Savannah Basley as Olivia, Trevor Lerner as Burly
26	6	"The Killer Inside"	Heidi Saman	Sehaj Sethi	January 30, 2022	0.28
Shiraz, a young Arab-American doctor desperate to save her dying father who needs a liver transplant by any means possible, is haunted by a dark figure. Cast: Sarah Himadeh as Shiraz, Samer Salem as Karim, Michael Benyaer as Ahmed
27	7	"Patel Motel Cartel"	Nimisha Mukerji	Sehaj Sethi	February 6, 2022	0.22
A troubled Indian-American youth welcomes a new tenant to his family's motel, only for strange things to begin happening. Cast: Chris River as Krish, Rashi Grewal as Ahana, Dejan Loyola as JD, Munish Sharma as Ajay, Requell Jodeah as Sonya
28	8	"Erased"	Albert Shin	Liz Alper	February 6, 2022	0.20
Leilani is a young Hawaiian woman fighting to protect her home from property developers whom is thrust into a horrifying vision of a reality where she and her culture does not exist. Cast: Mapuana Makia as Leilani, Leanne Khol Young as Kendra, Eva Brooke Baker as Sophia, Peter Shinkoda as Koa, Remy Marthaller as Maile, Nani Browne as Alana, Keilani Elizabeth Rose as Kala, Jason McKinnon as Owen
29	9	"Heirloom"	DuBois Ashong	Lekethia Dalcoe	February 20, 2022	0.26
A recently widowed African-American father and his young daughter move into a new home with a dark history in the form of a strange tree in their back yard that soon targets them. Cast: Romaine Waite as Montrell Davis, Alaysia Jackson as Vivie Davis, Erin Karpluk as Clara, BJ Harrison as Franny
30	10	"Homecoming"	Chaves Olmos	Stephanie Adams-Santos & Lisa Morales	February 20, 2022	0.23
Returning home at his dying father's request forces a young Latino man to face his estranged two older brothers and his own demons, both metaphorical and real. Cast: Andres Collantes as Axel Hernandez, Michel Issa Rubio as Dante Hernandez, Zak Santiago as Javi Hernandez, Tim Perez as Rodrigo Hernandez, Sandra Flores as Tia Flores, Isaiah Ramirez as TBA
