= Sweetheart (2019 American film) =

2019 American survival horror film directed by J.D. Dillard

- Film poster
- Directed by: J. D. Dillard
- Written by: J. D. Dillard; Alex Hyner; Alex Theurer
- Produced by: Jason Blum; J. D. Dillard; Bill Karesh; Alex Hyner; Alex Theurer
- Starring: Kiersey Clemons; Emory Cohen; Hanna Mangan-Lawrence; Andrew Crawford
- Cinematography: Stefan Duscio
- Edited by: Gina Hirsch
- Music by: Charles Scott IV
- Production company: Blumhouse Productions
- Distributed by: Universal Pictures
- Release dates: January 28, 2019 (Sundance); October 22, 2019 (United States)
- Running time: 82 minutes
- Country: United States
- Language: English

Sweetheart is a 2019 American survival horror film directed by J. D. Dillard, written by Dillard, Alex Theurer and Alex Hyner, and starring Kiersey Clemons, Emory Cohen, Hanna Mangan-Lawrence and Andrew Crawford. It was produced by Jason Blum, Dillard, Theurer, Hyner and Bill Karesh. The movie tells the story of a castaway who washes up on an island and must survive there while being stalked by a humanoid sea monster.

Sweetheart had its world premiere at the Sundance Film Festival on January 28, 2019. It was released by Universal Pictures on October 22, 2019, on streaming services and on demand.

== Plot ==
After their boat sinks during a storm, Jennifer "Jenn" Remming washes ashore on a small, tropical island and then finds her friend Brad who dies from his wounds shortly after. While exploring the island, Jenn discovers the belongings and graves of a family that once lived there. She later buries Brad's corpse in the sand, but she discovers the grave uncovered and a trail of blood leading to the ocean the following morning.

The next day while retrieving her newly surfaced luggage while swimming, Jenn finds an ominous hole in the ocean's floor. That night, Jenn fails to flag down an airplane using a flare gun and encounters a giant humanoid sea monster. Jenn manages to hide from the sea monster for the next four nights. As Jenn prepares for the fourth night, the corpse of another mutual friend, Zack, washes ashore mutilated and bisected. Jenn later uses his body as bait, seeing the sea monster clearly for the first time. For her fifth attempt, Jenn sleeps in a makeshift hammock in the trees to watch the monster arrive. When the monster notices the hammock, he starts to touch it and it slowly drops, Jenn stabs the creature with a sharpened stick and narrowly escapes.

The next day, Jenn is reunited with her boyfriend, Lucas Griffin, and friend, Mia Reed, after the two wash ashore in a life raft. Jenn warns Lucas and Mia about the creature, but they dismiss her claims. Jenn later discovers Lucas' pocketknife bloodied. Jenn tries to convince them to get in the lifeboat and escape before dark, but Lucas snaps at her and refuses to go. Jenn makes a desperate attempt to flee without the two, but they chase her and throw her out of the life raft. During the escape attempt, Mia knocks Jenn out with a boat paddle after Jenn kicks her in the head. Later, Jenn regains consciousness to find herself tied up. Mia reveals Jenn's past of fabricated lies while Jenn tries to convince her of the danger. Lucas returns and refuses to release Jenn. After Mia leaves, he hints that he participated in Zack's demise. Before Jenn can ask what happened to their friend, Mia is attacked by the sea monster. Lucas leaves Jenn tied up to fight it himself but fails to save Mia, who is dragged into the water. Jenn breaks free of her bindings and rescues Lucas.

The next day, Lucas and Jenn attempt to escape in the life raft. Jenn discovers the inside is covered in blood, presumably belonging to Zack. As the two head west, the sea monster attacks the raft, eventually ripping through the base and grabbing Jenn. As Jenn is being dragged down to the black hole, she remembers Lucas' pocketknife and stabs the monster. It releases her and swims back up to the raft to drag Lucas to his death.

Now alone, Jenn decides to confront the monster. Before setting up a trap for the creature she chronicles her experiences with it in her journal in hopes of aiding any castaways who might wash up on the island after her if she fails. That night, she lures the monster into a circle of wood and grass, which she sets fire to. She battles the monster with a series of sharpened branches and bones from the graves of a family the monster killed. Both severely injured, it chases Jenn to the shoreline but collapses from its wounds. Jenn decapitates the corpse and limps away to the raft, carrying the severed head as proof of what happened on the island.

== Cast ==
- Kiersey Clemons as Jennifer Remming
- Emory Cohen as Lucas Griffin
- Hanna Mangan-Lawrence as Mia Reed
- Andrew Crawford as the Creature
- Benedict Samuel as Brad

== Production ==
On February 2, 2017, Blumhouse Productions announced that Kiersey Clemons would star in the film, and J. D. Dillard would co-write, produce and direct. On May 9, 2017, it was announced that Hanna Mangan-Lawrence, Emory Cohen, and Benedict Samuel would co-star.

Dillard said the idea for the movie came to him while he was in Virginia Beach, Virginia, "just standing and looking out at the water with some friends, trying to think of the scariest possible thing that could happen. And [I decided] that would be if a creature were to stand up and look at me. The idea came from that shot, basically. We kind of went backward from there. Also, a lot of Sweetheart came from my own frustration about how much backstory there is in a lot of genre stories. Almost as an exercise I wanted to see what it would be like to take all of that away and revert back to let the camera and our sound design and our actors do all the work."

The title of Sweetheart, ambiguous and uncharacteristic of a horror movie, came about "as we got deeper into the script", said Dillard. "[I]t just seemed way more fun to hang the title on this term for Kiersey's character. Also, it's a lot harder to figure out what [the movie is] about." He told Fangoria that he wanted to avoid the film being pigeonholed as a genre movie when it premiered at the Sundance Film Festival. "[M]ost people didn't know it's a creature movie. In fact, no one knew it was a creature movie. 'It's a movie called Sweetheart and this girl is on an island and there's weird stuff here. What is that about?'"

Clemons said the story was a political allegory with a racial empowerment theme: "At the time, we were really reacting to the [2016] election, and the fear of this monster [Donald Trump] being in office. We wanted [the film's creature] to be this big white translucent figure because normally scary things are dark – we wanted to do the complete opposite of that. ... There's a lot of low-key political themes in it." She said Dillard, who is African-American, "wrote it visually imagining one of his sisters. This was inspired by them, and for them. He wouldn't have made it without a Black woman being the lead role. It also plays into those themes of Black female hysteria and people not believing Black women or people of color when we say that we're in danger, or that something is violent to us."

=== Filming ===
The movie was shot in less than one month on a small, private island in the South Pacific, within the Mamanuca Islands of Fiji. Dillard said, "We lived on the main island and commuted half an hour every day to a much smaller island called Bounty Island [also known as Kadavulailai]. Basically, we just rented the entire island and the bungalows [served as] trailers and production offices."

The creature, whom the crew nicknamed Charlie, was played by Andrew Crawford, an Australian ballet dancer who had previously been the Xenomorph in Alien: Covenant. Dillard wanted a new creature performer, "someone whose movement vocabulary wasn't, 'I've played 1000 creatures.' ... [P]art of what we were trying to wrap our head around was to go back to an instinctual level, working with someone who just comes from a different world." Crawford "suffered in that role. The costume weighs north of 180 pounds all in. It's hot. We're in Fiji. Charlie's head itself was very unwieldy in its weight. So it's not just a creative gig; it's like an endurance gig and a psychological gig. And what we really have to do there is ... listen to him and listen to his support team. If [they say Crawford can only do] one more take, it's one more take. You can't abuse that. ... [Y]ou don't want anybody hurt or passing out. The other very peculiar fear we dealt with: that suit is made of foam latex and if you were to ever actually fall in the water it basically doubles, if not triples, in its weight because of all the water it absorbs. So he could easily drown in the suit."

== Release ==
Sweetheart had its world premiere at the Sundance Film Festival on January 28, 2019. It was released on October 22, 2019, by Universal Pictures, to streaming services and on demand.

=== Critical response ===
On Rotten Tomatoes, the film has an approval rating of 93% based on 41 reviews, with an average rating of 7.00/10. The site's critic's consensus reads: "Carried by Kiersey Clemons' performance, Sweetheart balances smart subtext and social commentary against effective genre thrills." Metacritic assigned the film a weighted average score of 71 out of 100, based on 7 critics, indicating "generally favourable reviews".

Todd Gilchrist of TheWrap wrote: "Director and co-writer J.D. Dillard delivers a smart, streamlined thriller that skillfully integrates a careful whisper of social commentary into a story that also unfolds masterfully as a straightforward genre workout." David Ehrlich of IndieWire gave it a B− and wrote: "What this potent micro-dose of a movie lacks in showmanship, it makes up for in purity and resourcefulness and a rugged performance from Kiersey Clemons".

John DeFore of The Hollywood Reporter wrote of the film: "A cracking little one-hander (mostly) that rations glimpses of its well-designed beastie expertly, the picture will please genre fans who don't mind long stretches with no dialogue." Refinery29 highlighted the lead's mostly singlehanded acting: "With almost no dialogue, Clemons delivers a startling, charismatic performance. Jenn has very little backstory, but we get a real sense of her personality just from watching her walk around this idyllic setting or run from the nightmare it turns into."

In a negative review, a writer for Variety said of the movie: "Not quite original or stylish enough to be memorable."
