= Wayne (TV series) =

2019 American action comedy television series

- Genre: Action comedy; Black comedy
- Created by: Shawn Simmons
- Starring: Mark McKenna; Ciara Bravo; Joshua J. Williams
- Opening theme: "Apple Tree" by Wolfmother
- Composer: Steven Argila
- Country of origin: United States
- Original language: English
- No. of seasons: 1
- No. of episodes: 10

Production
- Executive producers: Paul Wernick; Rhett Reese; Greg Coolidge; Kirk Ward; Shawn Simmons; Iain B. MacDonald (pilot)
- Producers: John Ryan; Daniel Hank (pilot)
- Production locations: Hamilton, Ontario
- Cinematography: D. Gregor Hagey
- Editors: Michael S. Stern; Les Butler; Omar Hassan-Reep; Tom Lewis
- Camera setup: Single-camera
- Running time: 30–35 minutes
- Production companies: Coolidge Ward Entertainment; Reese Wernick Productions; Endeavor Content

Original release
- Network: YouTube Premium
- Release: January 16, 2019

Wayne is an American action comedy television series created by Shawn Simmons that premiered on January 16, 2019, on YouTube Premium. The series stars Mark McKenna, Ciara Bravo, and Joshua J. Williams and it follows Wayne, "a 16-year-old Dirty Harry with a heart of gold", as he sets out to retrieve his late father's stolen car with the help of Del, a girl he has a crush on.

On August 16, 2019, the series was cancelled after one season. The show was added to Amazon Prime Video on November 6, 2020 but has since been removed, and is available on Netflix, and via the official Wayne YouTube channel to users with a YouTube Premium subscription.

== Premise ==
Wayne starts in Brockton, Massachusetts in present day. The titular character "sets out on a dirt bike with his new crush Del to take back the 1979 Pontiac Trans Am that was stolen from his father before he died." The car is in Ocala, Florida. Wayne, Del, and a host of oddball characters go on a road trip to get it back. "It is Wayne and Del against the world."

== Cast and characters ==
=== Main ===
- Mark McKenna as Wayne McCullough Jr., a teenage boy who attempts to retrieve his late father's stolen car.
- Ciara Bravo as Delilah "Del" Luccetti, a girl from Brockton for whom Wayne develops feelings.
- Joshua J. Williams as Orlando Hikes, Wayne's best friend (Note: Williams is only credited in episodes he appears in.)

=== Recurring ===
- Stephen Kearin as Sergeant Stephen Geller
- James Earl as Officer Jay Ganetti, aka "Cop a' Soup"
- Dean Winters as Bobby Luccetti, Del's father
- Jon Champagne as Carl Lucetti, Del's brother
- Jamie Champagne as Teddy Lucetti, Del's brother
- Mike O'Malley as Principal Tom Cole from Hagler High
- Francesco Antonio as Reggie, Wayne's stepbrother
- Kirk Ward as Calvin Clay, Wayne's stepfather
- Michaela Watkins as Maureen McNulty, Wayne's mother
- Sean Patrick Dolan as Darren
- Thomas Mitchell Barnet as Scott
- Patrick Gallagher as Mr. Hernandez, Wayne's landlord
- Maxwell McCabe-Lokos as Eric
- Zoé De Grand'Maison as Jenny
- Odessa Adlon as Trish
- Akiel Julien as Gill
- Jack Foley as Orande
- Harrison Tanner as Stick

=== Guest ===
"Chapter One: Get Some Then"

- Ray McKinnon as Wayne McCullough Sr., Wayne's father

"Chapter Two: No Priests"

- Janet Porter as Tracey
- Nick Serino as Jamie
- Tiio Horn as Kyra

"Chapter Three: The Goddamned Beacon of Truth"

- Torri Webster as Emma

"Chapter Five: Del"

- Abigail Spencer as Donna Luccetti, Del's late mother

"Chapter Six: Who Even Are We Now?"

- Ernie Grunwald as Vice Principal Walsh from Alabaster High in Richmond Hill, Georgia
- Bill Lake as Sheriff

"Chapter Seven: It'll Last Forever"

- Peyton Meyer as Bradley

"Chapter Eight: Musta Burned Like Hell"

- Pedro Miguel Arce as Cashier

"Chapter Ten: Buckle the F**k Up"

- Derek Theler as Conan the Barbarian
- Kevin Hanchard as Sergeant Randall

== Episodes ==
| No. | Title | Directed by | Written by | Original release date |
|---|---|---|---|---|
| 1 | "Chapter One: Get Some Then" | Iain B. MacDonald | Shawn Simmons | January 16, 2019 |
Wayne, a violent teenager from Brockton, MA, is immediately taken with Del, a girl who shows up on his doorstep selling cookies. While talking to Del, Wayne is ambushed by Del's father and older brothers, where they beat him brutally. When Wayne's father dies from cancer, Wayne burns down his house with his father's corpse still in it, then goes to Del's house. He invites her to drive to Florida to retrieve Wayne's father's 1979 Pontiac Trans Am. He is confronted by her family again but fights them off, biting off her dad's nose.
| 2 | "Chapter Two: No Priests" | Steve Pink | Shawn Simmons | January 16, 2019 |
Del starts to have doubts about Wayne when he reveals that he does not know where they are going and fails to complete a simple task for her. Del buys a bus ticket to Los Angeles as a backup plan, getting into a fight with a waitress and cocaine addict named Tracey, with whom she eventually forms a bond. Convinced Del has abandoned him, Wayne heads back to their camp dejectedly. After talking to two kids who were trying to steal his things, Wayne tries to find Del with help from the two kids but gets kidnapped by Kyra and Jamie. Del and Tracey help save Wayne, and they continue on their way. Meanwhile, Wayne's best friend, his principal, Del's father and brothers, and two Brockton police officers (Sergeant Geller and Officer Jay) all set off to pursue Wayne and Del.
| 3 | "Chapter Three: The Goddamned Beacon of Truth" | Steve Pink | Rhett Reese & Paul Wernick | January 16, 2019 |
Wayne and Del take shelter at a motel and soon get caught up with some spring break-bound college students. After fleeing the local police, they quickly realize that they have been robbed. Meanwhile, Orlando convinces Principal Cole to help him find Wayne after Orlando realizes that Del's family may kill Wayne.
| 4 | "Chapter Four: Find Something Black to Wear" | Tessa Hoffe | Sarah Jane Cunningham & Suzie V. Freeman | January 16, 2019 |
Wayne and Del each attempt to make some money. Wayne gets a job as a day laborer on a construction site while Del tries to pawn some of their belongings. Wayne attacks his employer after learning that he was trying to deport the immigrant workers to Mexico, nailing the man's hands to his van. Del meets a grieving widow and decides that she and Wayne should go to the husband's funeral. Meanwhile, Carl and Teddy celebrate their birthday while their father is drunk. They come to realize he has mistreated them and agree to beat him up, but get a message from Del wishing them a happy birthday and they decide to put their problems with their father aside so they can find her.
| 5 | "Chapter Five: Del" | Tessa Hoffe | Lauren Houseman | January 16, 2019 |
Flashbacks show Del's family life a year before meeting Wayne and how she tries to fit in at school in spite of her con artist mother. Her family is dysfunctional, but they mean well and make an effort for her as seen when they try to help her when she runs for class president. Following her mother's death, Del's father descends deeper into alcoholism, her father and brothers become more cruel, and she becomes depressed and develops a cynical personality.
| 6 | "Chapter Six: Who Even Are We Now?" | Stephanie Laing | Sophie Pustil & Paul Jaffe | January 16, 2019 |
When Del is mistaken for a truant at a school in Georgia, she befriends some of the locals and considers staying. She and Wayne are invited to a dance, and while getting ready, Wayne notices the bus ticket, and leaves Del. After some convincing, Wayne attends the dance, and the two reconcile. They share a tender moment, but are interrupted when Del's family catch up with them, ambushing the two. However, Wayne is saved by the locals, and drives away with Del. Meanwhile, Orlando helps his principal do well on his speech in his conference.
| 7 | "Chapter Seven: It'll Last Forever" | Stephanie Laing | Shawn Simmons | January 16, 2019 |
Following the brawl at the school dance, Del's new friends force Wayne to take painkillers when he refuses to go to the emergency room. Later, Wayne tells Del that her father is dying in the hospital after he hears about it on the news. She proceeds to ask him to take her there to see her father. It turns out to be a trap by the police to catch them, but Del wants to visit him anyway. Despite admitting that Wayne hates hospitals because of his father's cancer, he agrees to help her sneak in. They share a kiss in the morgue, and Del visits her father. She gives him a drink, and tells him that she is going away. While there, Wayne and Del encounter Geller, and escape, prompting Geller to become firmer in his commitment to catching Wayne.
| 8 | "Chapter Eight: Musta Burned Like Hell" | Michael Patrick Jann | Spencer Sloan | January 16, 2019 |
Wayne and Del finally reach Ocala, FL, and find his father's car by chance at a gas station. Wayne tracks it down and is unexpectedly reunited with his mother. Wayne also meets his step brother, Reggie, and stepfather, Calvin. Wayne tries to bond with his mother while Del tries to warn him that she will hurt him again. Wayne confronts Del about the bus ticket she bought earlier, and Del reveals that was her backup plan. Meanwhile, Orlando and Principal Cole get sidetracked at a strip club.
| 9 | "Chapter Nine: Thought We Was Friends" | Michael Patrick Jann | Greg Coolidge & Kirk Ward | January 16, 2019 |
Del abandons Wayne and strikes out on her own. Wayne tries to bond with his mother, who reveals he has to leave. Furious, he trashes the house and plans to steal back his father's car and go after Del. However, Calvin and Reggie catch him. Meanwhile, Orlando and Cole stumble upon a clue to Wayne's whereabouts as well as finding Del. Orlando eventually reveals to Del how he and Wayne became best friends. Wayne had come to him seeking help to deal with a group of bullies blackmailing a girl with a video. When Del asks what was in the video, and Orlando says it was a woman high on drugs, Del realizes she was the girl he helped. Del then decides to rescue Wayne with Orlando and Principal Cole. Geller and Jay find Wayne, but Reggie knocks out Jay. While forced into a fight with Calvin, Geller reveals that he had served 817 days in prison for a crime he did not commit while in Thailand, where he was forced to learn how to fight in order to survive. He defeats Calvin in a one-on-one fight (with some help from Wayne) and frees Wayne. However, Geller tells Wayne that he is under arrest.
| 10 | "Chapter Ten: Buckle the F**k Up" | Steve Pink | Shawn Simmons, Greg Coolidge, & Kirk Ward | January 16, 2019 |
Wayne is held at the Ocala police station, where Geller finally makes Wayne realize the error of his ways, and that he needs Del. After catching up with Wayne's mom, Del asks her where he is, then goes after him. Geller gets a report on a crime scene, but it turns out to be a ruse for Reggie to get the car after it was impounded. Reggie assaults the only cop left at the station, and steals the keys. Before leaving, he sees Wayne locked up, and assaults him. The two have a fight, resulting in Wayne's arm getting crushed by a metal cabinet. Before Reggie can kill him, Del arrives, and the two knock him out. After defeating Reggie, the two go into Wayne's car, with Wayne barely retaining consciousness and Del planning on taking him to a hospital. Meanwhile, Cole and Orlando help Cole's new dog give birth. Geller returns to the police station and discovers Reggie. While driving, Del tries to confess her love for Wayne, but he beats her to it. Del's father then crashes into them, knocking Del unconscious. They take Del away from Wayne, and Del's father mutilates Wayne's nose in retaliation for biting off his own nose, leaving him to die. An ambulance finds him hours later, still crawling to Del's necklace that she lost on the road. Wayne is then arrested, but keeps her necklace.

== Production ==
=== Development ===
On December 7, 2017, it was announced that YouTube had given the production a pilot order. The series was created by Shawn Simmons and executive produced by Rhett Reese, Paul Wernick, Greg Coolidge, and Kirk Ward. The pilot episode was set to be written by Simmons and directed by Iain B. MacDonald. Production companies involved with the series were slated to consist of Endeavor Content.

On April 23, 2018, it was announced that YouTube had given the production a series order for a first season consisting of ten episodes. On November 19, 2018, it was announced that the series would premiere on January 16, 2019.

=== Casting ===
Alongside the pilot order announcement, it was confirmed that Mark McKenna and Ciara Bravo would star in the series. Alongside the announcement of the series order, it was reported that Joshua J. Williams had been cast in a recurring role and that Dean Winters and Mike O'Malley would make guest appearances in the pilot episode.

=== Filming ===
Principal photography for the pilot episode took place in Ontario, Canada, and lasted until December 12, 2017. Filming for the rest of the series began on June 11, 2018, in Toronto, Ontario, Canada, and was scheduled to last until August 16, 2018.

== Release ==
=== Marketing ===
On September 21, 2018, a teaser trailer for the series was released. On November 19, 2018, the official trailer for the series was released.

=== Premiere ===
On September 23, 2018, the series held its world premiere during the second annual Tribeca TV Festival in New York City. Following the screening, a conversation was held featuring members of the cast and crew, including creator Shawn Simmons, actors Mark McKenna and Ciara Bravo, director Iain B. MacDonald, and writers and executive producers Greg Coolidge, Kirk Ward, Rhett Reese, and Paul Wernick.

== Reception ==
=== Critical response ===
The series has been met with a positive response from critics since its premiere. On the review aggregation website Rotten Tomatoes, the series holds a 100% approval rating with an average rating of 8/10 based on 13 reviews. The website's critical consensus reads, "The most thoughtfully violent series you'll see all year, Wayne is a home run."

In a positive review, IndieWire's Ben Travers awarded the series a grade of "A−" and praised it saying, "Wayne may feel familiar to other stories, Bonnie and Clyde included. But Simmons' thoughtful, engrossing, and altogether joyful new series carves its own path on the cold roads of America’s eastern seaboard." In another encouraging criticism, Screen Rant's Kevin Yeoman commended the series saying, "With its varying tones, stellar lead performances, and great supporting cast, Wayne is much more than the foul-mouthed action-comedy it makes itself out to be. The laughs may be pitch black at times, and the violence is occasionally shocking, but there’s a fascinating and entertaining sweetness woven into every scene that’ll hit you like a blast of rock salt to the heart." In an additional acclamatory critique, Rolling Stone's Alan Sepinwall gave the series a rating of 3½ out of 5 stars and was similarly approving saying, "Both the show and Wayne’s attempts to right the world’s wrongs don’t always work, but they mean well and are rarely dull."

=== Viewership ===
Within five days of the series premiere, the first episode had accumulated over 10 million views.
