= Lukita Maxwell =

Indonesian and American actress (born 2001)

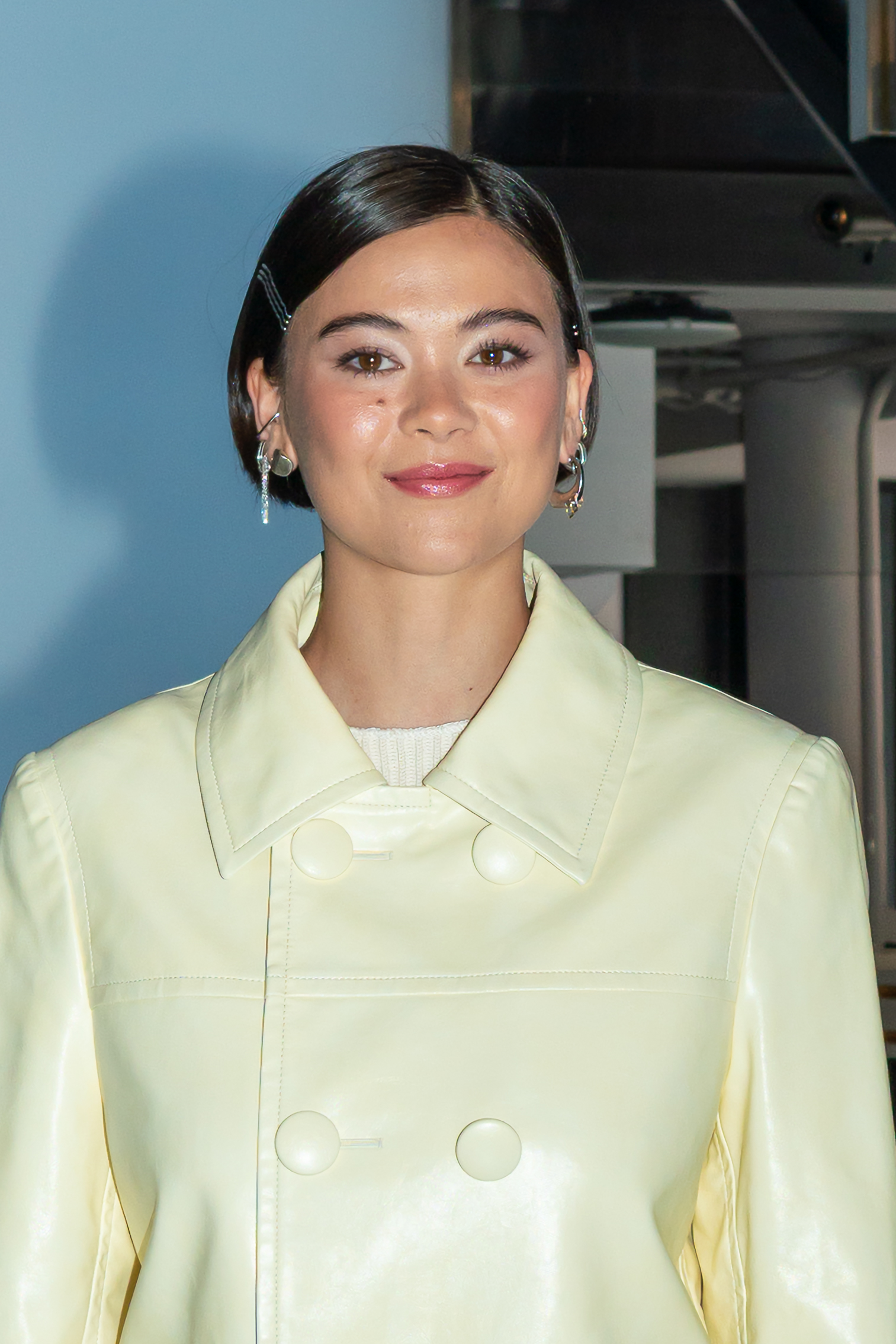
- Maxwell in 2026
- Born: October 27, 2001 (age 24); Jakarta, Indonesia
- Occupation: Actress
- Years active: 2016–present

Lukita Maxwell (born October 27, 2001) is an Indonesian-American actress. On television, she is known for her roles in the HBO Max series Generation (2021) and the Apple TV series Shrinking (2023–present). She also appeared in the films The Young Wife (2023), Backrooms and An Autumn Summer (both in 2026).

== Early life ==
Maxwell was born in Jakarta to a Chinese Indonesian mother and a White American father from Salt Lake City. She spent her early childhood in Bali before moving to the United States, settling in St. George, Utah.

Maxwell was homeschooled. She developed an interest in acting through reading William Shakespeare's works, competing in a local Shakespeare Festival at a young age. She had begun studying architecture at the Pratt Institute when she was cast in Generation.

== Career ==
In September 2019, Maxwell was cast as a series regular in the HBO Max teen drama series Generation. The series aired in 2021, and was canceled later that year. She was then cast as a series regular in the Apple TV series Shrinking, playing Alice, the daughter of the main character, played by Jason Segel. The series started airing in 2023.

In 2024, Maxwell appeared in the Blumhouse Productions horror film Afraid, directed by Chris Weitz. Her next role was in 2026 with the A24 film Backrooms.

== Personal life ==
Maxwell identifies as queer. She is a practicing Buddhist.

== Filmography ==
Key
†	Denotes films that have not yet been released

=== Film ===
Year	Title	Role	Notes
2023	The Young Wife	Fern	
2024	Afraid	Iris Pike	
2026	An Autumn Summer	Cody	
2026	Backrooms	Kathrine "Kat" Taylor	
2026	Magazine	Tabitha	

=== Television ===
Year	Title	Role	Notes
2016	Speechless	Jillian	4 episodes
2021	Generation	Delilah	Main role; 16 episodes
2023–present	Shrinking	Alice Laird	Main role; 33 episodes
