= Mark McKenna =

Irish actor and singer

- McKenna in 2016
- Occupations: Actor; singer; songwriter
- Years active: 2016–present
- Television: Sing Street; Wayne

Mark McKenna is an Irish actor and singer-songwriter. He portrayed Wayne McCullough Jr. in the first series of Wayne, and appeared in the 2016 comedy-drama film Sing Street. McKenna portrayed the role of Simon Kelleher in NBC series One of Us Is Lying from 2021 to 2022. He has also guest-starred in various other productions, including Overlord (2018), An Autumn Summer (2026), The Tourist (2022–2024), and Most Dangerous Game (2020–2023); he is also set to star in the American thriller film Isolation Booth in 2027.

McKenna started posting music on SoundCloud in 2016, under the name Loverboy. in 2020, he released the extended play (EP) R.I.P. The Girl Talk under the pseudonym The Girl Talk. McKenna also formed the band milk. with Conor King, Conor Gorman, and Morgan Wilson. Over the course of their career, they have released four EP's and 14 singles.

== Career ==
=== Film ===
In 2017, McKenna made his film debut in the comedy-drama film Sing Street. The same year, he also starred in the series Kat & Alfie: Redwater. McKenna portrayed Private First Class Murphy, a paratrooper in the 2018 action horror film Overlord. He also had a predominant role as Wayne McCullough Jr. in the first series of Wayne (2019). In November 2019, it was announced McKenna would star as Simon in the NBC series One of Us Is Lying. In 2020, he played Col in the Irish-Canadian film The Winter Lake, and in 2022, he starred as Alice Cooper in Dalíland.

McKenna starred in the 2023 film The Miracle Club, and the same year, he made an appearance as Taft in the action television series Most Dangerous Game. In 2024, he played the roles of Ned in Small Things like These and Fergal McDonnell in The Tourist respectively. McKenna portrayed Cody in the American coming-of-age love story film An Autumn Summer (2026), and is set to star in Isolation Booth (2027).

=== Music ===
In 2016, McKenna began posting music under the name Loverboy on SoundCloud. He released the singles "When I Know" and "Heroic Chic" in 2018 under the pseudonym The Girl Talk, and released extended play (EP) R.I.P. The Girl Talk in 2020. McKenna formed the band milk. with Conor King, Conor Gorman, and Morgan Wilson. They released their debut EP 1, The EP in June 2020, and released the follow-up EP's 2, The EP., London, and 3, The EP. in August 2021 and December 2023 respectively.

== Filmography ==
Year	Title	Role	Notes	Ref.
2016	Sing Street	Eamon	Musical comedy-drama film	
2017	Kat & Alfie: Redwater	Jimmy	1 episode (Series 1, Episode 6)	
2018	Overlord	Private First Class Murphy	American action horror film	
2019	Wayne	Wayne McCullough Jr.	Main role	
2020	The Winter Lake	Col	Irish-Canadian mystery drama film	
2021–22	One of Us Is Lying (TV series)	Simon Kelleher	Main cast (series 1); guest (series 2)	
2022	Dalíland	Alice Cooper	American biographical film	
2023	Most Dangerous Game	Taft	4 episodes ("En Fuego", "Katie Girl", "Lighthouse", "Blood Work"), series 2	
2023	The Miracle Club	George Hennessy	British drama film	
2024	Small Things like These	Ned	Historical drama film	
2024	The Tourist	Fergal McDonnell	Main role (series 2)	
2026	An Autumn Summer	Kevin	American coming-of-age love story	
2027	Isolation Booth	—N/a	American thriller film	

== Discography ==
=== Extended plays ===
Title	Details
R.I.P. The Girl Talk	Released: May 7, 2020; Format: Digital download, streaming; Label: Wavefarm Records

=== Singles ===
Title	Year	Album
"When I Know"	2018	R.I.P. The Girl Talk
"Heroic Chic"	2018	R.I.P. The Girl Talk

=== Extended plays ===
Title	Details
1, The EP	Released: 19 June 2020; Format: Digital download, streaming; Label: Independent
2, The EP.	Released: 19 August 2021; Format: Digital download, streaming; Label: Boom.Records
London	Released: 12 October 2023; Format: Digital download, streaming; Label: Independent
3, The EP.	Released: 1 December 2023; Format: Digital download, streaming; Label: Independent

=== Singles ===
Title	Year	Album
"Drama Queen"	2019	1, The EP
"Temperature"	2019	Non-album single
"A Little More"	2019	1, The EP
"Always On Time"	2020	1, The EP
"Treat Me"	2020	1, The EP
"I Hate The Way You're Looking At Me (Lately)."	2020	2, The EP.
"You&I."	2021	2, The EP.
"2." (featuring Search Party Animal)	2021	2, The EP.
"In LA."	2021	2, The EP.
"You're So.	2021	2, The EP.
"I Might Bore You."	2022	3, The EP.
"Human Contact."	2022	3, The EP.
"I Think I Lost My Number Can I Have Yours?"	2023	3, The EP.
"Don't Miss It."	2024	Non-album single
