= An Autumn Summer =

Film by Jared Isaac

- Directed by: Jared Isaac
- Written by: Jared Isaac
- Produced by: Zach Aries; Becky Boggs; Jared Isaac
- Starring: Lukita Maxwell; Mark McKenna
- Cinematography: Brandon Somerhalder
- Edited by: Daniela Ovi
- Music by: Hayes Bradley
- Production company: Practical
- Distributed by: Blue Harbor Entertainment
- Release date: May 1, 2026
- Running time: 98 minutes
- Country: United States
- Language: English

An Autumn Summer is love story film starring Lukita Maxwell and Mark McKenna, and was filmed in Michigan. An Autumn Summer is the debut film by writer and director Jared Isaac and Blue Harbor Entertainment acquired the film for distribution.

== Synopsis ==
The film follows young lovers Kevin and Cody as they live their last summer together at a Michigan lake house before life takes them to different colleges. Amongst the beauty of Northern Michigan, the pair discover the depth of their feelings as they're tested by their conflicting futures.

== Casts ==
- Lukita Maxwell as Cody
- Mark McKenna as Kevin
- Jun Yu
- Julian Bass
- Louise Barnes
- Katie Baker
- Tony Horton

== Production ==
The film features cinematography by Brandon Somerhalder, winner of the 2022 Academic award for Best Documentary Short marks his first narrative work.

An Autumn Summer is produced by JohnPaul Morris, Becky Boggs, Zach Aries and Isaac, with Joshua D. Rogers as the executive producer.

== Release ==
The film premiered at Chicago's Music Box Theatre in 2026. The inaugural Fresh Coast Film Festival Traverse City hosted the Northern Michigan premiere of the indie romance film “An Autumn Summer” on 23 April to close its 2026 program. The film had a limited theatrical release on 1 May 2026. The film was officially released to rent or buy on June 9, 2026.

== Awards and nominations ==
The film has won several awards on the festival circuit including Best Director at the Phoenix Film Festival and the Audience Award at the Blue Whiskey Independent Film Festival.
