= The Young Wife (film) =

- Promotional poster
- Directed by: Tayarisha Poe
- Written by: Tayarisha Poe
- Produced by: Anne Carey; Tayarisha Poe
- Starring: Kiersey Clemons; Leon Bridges; Kelly Marie Tran; Michaela Watkins; Aya Cash; Brandon Micheal Hall; Lukita Maxwell; Sheryl Lee Ralph; Judith Light
- Cinematography: Jomo Fray
- Edited by: Kate Abernathy
- Music by: Terence Nance
- Production companies: FilmNation Entertainment; Archer Gray
- Distributed by: Republic Pictures
- Release dates: March 12, 2023 (SXSW); May 31, 2024 (United States)
- Running time: 97 minutes
- Country: United States
- Language: English

The Young Wife is a 2023 American drama film, written, directed, and produced by Tayarisha Poe. It stars Kiersey Clemons, Leon Bridges, Kelly Marie Tran, Michaela Watkins, Aya Cash, Brandon Micheal Hall, Lukita Maxwell, Sheryl Lee Ralph and Judith Light.

The film had its premiere at SXSW on March 12, 2023, followed by a digital release in the United States on May 31, 2024. It received positive reviews.

== Cast ==
- Kiersey Clemons as Celestina
- Leon Bridges as River
- Kelly Marie Tran as Tessa
- Michaela Watkins as Lara
- Aya Cash as Rose
- Brandon Micheal Hall as Ayman
- Lukita Maxwell as Fern
- Sheryl Lee Ralph as Angelique
- Judith Light as Cookie
- Connor Paolo as Geoffrey
- Aida Osman as Sabrina
- Jon Rudnitsky as Dave

== Production ==
In March 2022, Kiersey Clemons, Leon Bridges, Kelly Marie Tran, Michaela Watkins, Aya Cash, Brandon Micheal Hall, Lukita Maxwell, Sheryl Lee Ralph Judith Light, Aida Osman, Connor Paolo, and Jon Rudnitsky joined the cast of the film, with Tayarisha Poe directing from a screenplay she wrote.

== Release ==
It had its world premiere at South by Southwest on March 12, 2023.

== Reception ==
The film holds an 90% 'Fresh' score on review aggregator Rotten Tomatoes, based on 20 critic reviews with an average rating of 7.5/10. Metacritic, which uses a weighted average, assigned the film a score of 70 out of 100, based on 5 critics, indicating "generally favorable" reviews.
