= Park Circus (company) =

UK film distribution company

Park Circus Limited
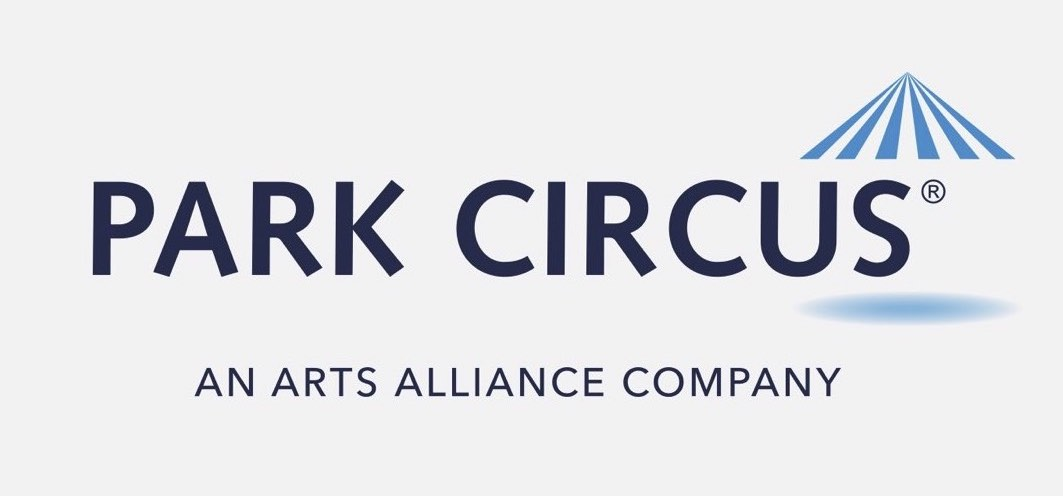
- Type: Public company
- Industry: Film distributor
- Founded: Scotland, UK 2003; 23 years ago
- Founder: John Letham, Nick Varley
- Headquarters: Glasgow, UK
- Area served: Worldwide
- Key people: Douglas Davis (CEO)
- Website: parkcircus.com

Park Circus is a film distributor based in the United Kingdom, and operating internationally. The company specialises in the distribution of classic and back catalogue / repertory films for theatrical exhibition. They represent over 25,000 films from Hollywood and British studios and a large number of independent rights owners.

They have also released contemporary films such as Kelly Reichardt's Certain Women and Nicolas Pesce's The Eyes of My Mother (2016).

== Film Libraries ==
Park Circus represents over 20,000 titles, including the following film libraries and collections:

- 20th Century Studios
- Arrow Films
- American International Pictures
- Cannon
- Cinerama Releasing Corporation
- FilmFour International
- First Independent Films
- Gainsborough Pictures
- Gaumont British
- HandMade Films
- Icon Entertainment International
- ITV Studios Global Entertainment (in conjunction with Shout! Factory’s Westchester Films division)
- Laika, LLC
- MGM/UA
- Network (DVD label)
- New Zealand Film Commission
- Orion Pictures
- Paramount Pictures
- PolyGram Filmed Entertainment
- Rank Organization
- Revolution Studios
- The Samuel Goldwyn Company
- Sony Pictures (Columbia Pictures, Screen Gems, Sony Pictures Classics, and TriStar Pictures)
- Universal Pictures
- Village Roadshow Pictures
- Walt Disney Studios Motion Pictures UK
- Warner Bros.
