= Generation (TV series) =

2021 American dramedy television series

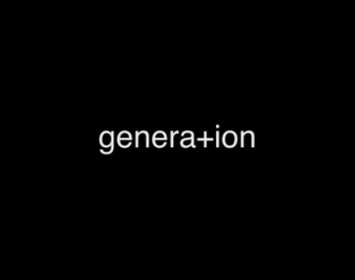
- Genre: Dramedy
- Created by: Zelda Barnz; Daniel Barnz
- Starring: Nathanya Alexander; Chloe East; Nava Mau; Lukita Maxwell; Haley Sanchez; Uly Schlesinger; Nathan Stewart-Jarrett; Chase Sui Wonders; Justice Smith; Martha Plimpton
- Composer: Zachary Dawes
- Country of origin: United States
- Original language: English
- No. of seasons: 1
- No. of episodes: 16

Production
- Executive producers: Daniel Barnz; Ben Barnz; Zelda Barnz; Lena Dunham; Sharr White; John Melfi; Jenni Konner
- Producers: Marissa Díaz; Michael P. Cohen; Paul F. Marks
- Cinematography: Sean Porter; Xavier Grobet; Laura M. Gonçalves; Yaron Orbach
- Editors: Debra F. Simone; Nena Erb; Adam Burr; Todd Downing
- Running time: 27–39 minutes
- Production companies: We're Not Brothers Productions; Good Thing Going; Lake Theo; I Am Jenni Konner Productions

Original release
- Network: HBO Max
- Release: March 11 – July 8, 2021

Generation (stylized as Genera+ion) is an American dramedy television series that premiered on HBO Max on March 11, 2021. In September 2021, the series was canceled after one season.

== Premise ==
Featuring an ensemble cast, the story follows a friend group of high school sophomores and juniors all from different walks of life in Orange County, California as they explore modern sexuality, challenge societally ingrained beliefs about life, love, and test the bonds of their families in their conservative community.

== Cast ==
=== Main ===
- Nathanya Alexander as Arianna, the rich, foul-mouthed best friend of Naomi who hides her insecurities with bigoted jokes
- Chloe East as Naomi, Nathan's careless twin sister
- Nava Mau as Ana, Greta's aunt, who is taking care of her and her brother
- Lukita Maxwell as Delilah, Arianna and Naomi's activist friend
- Haley Sanchez as Greta, a shy asexual lesbian with a crush on Riley
- Uly Schlesinger as Nathan, Naomi's neurotic twin brother who begins to explore his bisexuality
- Nathan Stewart-Jarrett as Sam, the school's new guidance counsellor who forms a bond with Chester
- Chase Sui Wonders as Riley, a popular student and budding photographer who is best friends with Nathan.
- Justice Smith as Chester, a confident, openly gay student
- Martha Plimpton as Megan, Naomi and Nathan's highly-strung, conservative mother

=== Recurring ===
- Sam Trammell as Mark, Megan's husband and Naomi and Nathan's father
- Anthony Keyvan as Pablo, a bad boy and Riley's ex-hookup who works at the aquarium
- J. August Richards as Joe, one of Arianna's fathers
- John Ross Bowie as Patrick, one of Arianna's fathers and a former evangelical
- Mary Birdsong as Mrs. Culpepper, the overly earnest head faculty member of the GSA
- Patricia De Leon as Sela, Greta's mother
- Sydney Mae Diaz as J, a bisexual stoner and philosopher who is friends with Chester
- Alicia Coppola as Carol, Riley's suburban, meddling mother
- Marwan Salama as Bo, an under-the-radar student
- Marisela Zumbado as Lucia, a confident, lesbian student
- Diego Josef as Cooper, an outgoing heterosexual student, protective of his transgender brother

=== Guest ===
- Tessa Albertson as Natalia, Naomi and Nathan's older sister
- Rachel Stubington as April

== Episodes ==
No.	Title	Directed by	Written by	Original release date
1	"Pilot"	Daniel Barnz	Zelda Barnz & Daniel Barnz	March 11, 2021
In a flash-forward, Naomi helps an unseen friend give birth in a bathroom stall at a mall. Three months earlier, Chester arrives at school and is reprimanded for violating the school's dress code. He is taken to Sam, the new guidance counselor, who tries to connect with him but Chester is resistant. Nathan, a closeted bisexual, uses Riley's phone to invite Chester to Riley's party. Nathan and his twin sister Naomi have a turbulent home life due to their uptight mother Megan, who is stressed due to planning the wedding of their older sister Natalia. Nathan takes a picture of Naomi's hickeys and jokingly threatens to show their mother; she in turn blackmails him by taking a photo of him sexting a guy, though Nathan denies being gay. At Riley's party, Nathan briefly hooks up with Naomi's boyfriend Jack but feels guilty about it and then ruins his first meeting with Chester. Greta leaves her aunt, who is taking care of her and her brother and goes to the party where Riley attempts to get her to open up. After putting Nathan to bed following the party, Riley jumps into the pool and floats at the bottom.
2	"Dickscovery"	Daniel Barnz	Zelda Barnz & Daniel Barnz	March 11, 2021
Three months into the future, Naomi rushes around the mall trying to find supplies to help her friend give birth. In the present, Greta accidentally sends a string of awkward messages to Riley. Sam confronts Chester after he sends him a picture of him rooftopping though Chester tells him there is nothing to worry about. In an attempt to keep him distracted, Sam advises Chester to join the GSA and he agrees under the condition that Sam joins too as a faculty supervisor. Nathan panics about Naomi finding out about him and Jack after she notices a birthmark in the picture she took of his phone. Arianna encourages Naomi to lose her virginity to Jack before being forced to attend a GSA meeting after making homophobic jokes in front of her dads. A lockdown causes Chester, Nathan, Riley, Greta, Arianna, and Sam to be stuck in the GSA meeting, and Naomi in the bathroom while on the toilet. While initially flippant about the situation, Chester grows increasingly hostile and confesses to Sam that he has an irrational fear of death after his mother died of cancer, leaving him to be raised by his grandmother. Greta and Riley grow closer when Riley opens up about her anxiety and Greta explains that her mother was wrongly deported. Naomi sees Jack's birthmark while hooking up with him in the bathroom and realizes that it was him sexting Nathan.
3	"Toasted"	Daniel Barnz	Zelda Barnz & Daniel Barnz	March 11, 2021
In the flashforward, Arianna arrives at the bathroom and it is revealed that Delilah is the one giving birth, though her friends are unaware of who the father is. Riley invites Greta to get high at an aquarium, exciting Greta though she is deflated when she finds that Chester has also been invited along. She is upset when she sees Riley hook up with one of the employees and begins to bond with Chester. Riley tells them that they can crash Natalia's rehearsal dinner to get free food. Naomi has begun ignoring Nathan, though Megan orders them to act civil so as not to embarrass the family at the dinner, which is held on a docked boat. At the dinner, Nathan and Arianna get high and begin to bond. Megan forces the twins to give a toast and Naomi fills hers with insults towards her brother. An intoxicated Nathan apologizes to her during his and reveals his bisexuality to the shocked wedding party. Natalia berates him for ruining the dinner and Megan dismisses Nathan's declaration about his sexuality, though Naomi forgives him. An embarrassed Nathan jumps overboard but is rescued by Chester.
4	"Pussy Power"	Channing Godfrey Peoples	Sharr White	March 18, 2021
5	"Gays and Confused"	Chioke Nassor	Lena Dunham	March 18, 2021
6	"The Wheels on the Bussy"	Chioke Nassor	Max Saltarelli	March 25, 2021
7	"Desert Island"	Daniel Barnz	Eli Wilson Pelton	March 25, 2021
8	"The Last Shall Be First"	Daniel Barnz	Teleplay by : Zelda Barnz & Daniel Barnz and Christina Nieves; Story by : Christina Nieves	April 1, 2021
9	"Deepfake"	Catalina Aguilar Mastretta	Zelda Barnz & Daniel Barnz	June 17, 2021
10	"Built for Pleasure"	Catalina Aguilar Mastretta	Christina Nieves	June 17, 2021
11	"Absolute Zero"	Andrew Ahn	Michelle Denise Jackson	June 17, 2021
12	"The High Priestess"	Andrew Ahn	Max Saltarelli	June 24, 2021
13	"There's Something About Hamburger Mary's"	Anu Valia	Sono Patel	June 24, 2021
14	"Click Whirr"	Anu Valia	Sharr White	July 1, 2021
15	"L'Amour"	Daniel Barnz	Sono Patel	July 1, 2021
16	"V-Day"	Daniel Barnz	Zelda Barnz & Daniel Barnz	July 8, 2021

== Production ==
=== Development ===
Generation was first announced in September 2019 with a pilot order. The pilot is written by Daniel Barnz and his daughter Zelda Barnz. Daniel Barnz also directed the pilot. In December 2019, the series was officially ordered to series. The series is created by Daniel Barnz and Zelda Barnz. Executive producers include Daniel, Zelda, Ben Barnz (who is Daniel's husband and Zelda's other father), Jenni Konner and Lena Dunham. Production companies involved with the series were Good Thing Going Productions, We're Not Brothers Productions and, I Am Jenni Konner Productions. On September 14, 2021, HBO Max canceled the series after one season.

=== Casting ===
In September 2019, Martha Plimpton, Justice Smith, Chloe East, Michael Johnston as Ollie, Nava Mau, Haley Sanchez, Uly Schlesinger, Nathanya Alexander as Arianna, Lukita Maxwell and Chase Sui Wonders were cast to star while Sam Trammell joined the cast in a recurring role that same month. In August 2020, Nathan Stewart-Jarrett was added to the main cast. In October 2020, Anthony Keyvan, Diego Josef, J. August Richards, John Ross Bowie, Mary Birdsong, Patricia De Leon, and Sydney Mae Diaz were cast in recurring roles. In December 2020, Alicia Coppola, Marwan Salama, and Marisela Zumbado joined the cast in recurring roles.

=== Filming ===
Filming for the pilot began at South Pasadena High School in September 2019. The series continued filming at the location during the COVID-19 pandemic.

== Release ==
The series premiered on March 11, 2021, with the first 3 episodes available immediately. The season was divided into two 8-episode parts, with the first part ending on April 1, and the second one premiering on June 17 the same year.

On August 17, 2022, it was announced that HBO Max would be removing several series, including Generation.

The series was added to Tubi on February 1, 2023.

== Reception ==
Reviewing the series for Rolling Stone, Alan Sepinwall gave a rating of 3/5 and said, "Generation arrives at a moment when TV has no shortage of shows about, as Megan sarcastically describes it, 'this secret life of teenagers' hoo-hah.' It's lighter than some of its peers, but still self-conscious... Still, there's promise here." Saloni Gajjar of The A.V. Club gave the series a B− and wrote, "once these teens start interacting with one another in a much more grounded manner, Genera+ion's strengths emerge, as it dives meaningfully into serious issues meaningfully without getting too dark."

On Rotten Tomatoes, the series holds an approval rating of 75% based on 28 critic reviews, with an average rating of 6/10. The website's critics consensus reads, "Genera+ion's salacious flourishes can feel more try-hard than authentic, but this inclusive portrayal of Gen Z shines when it identifies the universal pains of being a teenager." Metacritic gave the series a weighted average score of 60 out of 100 based on 12 critics, indicating "mixed or average reviews".
