= Celeste O'Connor =

Kenyan-American actor (born 1998)

- Born: December 2, 1998 (age 27); Nairobi, Kenya
- Education: Johns Hopkins University
- Occupation: Actor
- Years active: 2017–present

Celeste O'Connor (born December 2, 1998) is an Burundian-born American actor. They played Paloma Davis in the Amazon original film Selah and the Spades.

== Early life and education ==
Celeste O'Connor was born on December 2, 1998, in Nairobi, Kenya, to a White American father and Burundian mother. O'Connor and their younger brother were raised in Baltimore, Maryland by their parents. They attended Notre Dame Preparatory School and studied the violin and singing at Peabody Preparatory. As of April 2020, O'Connor was attending Johns Hopkins University, majoring in public health and pre-medicine. They also took courses in Islamic studies. O'Connor is interested in the social determinants of health including food security, housing insecurity, and education.

== Career ==
O'Connor played the younger version of Gugu Mbatha-Raw's character in the 2018 Netflix film Irreplaceable You. They appeared in the 2019 film Wetlands. In 2019, O'Connor played Paloma Davis in the film Selah and the Spades. Reporter Anagha Komaragiri of The Daily Californian praised O'Connor's "subtle" and "pensive presence" until the "tense finale".

O'Connor was cast in July 2019 for the film Ghostbusters: Afterlife (2021), and reprised their role in Ghostbusters: Frozen Empire (2024). In May 2022, they were cast as one of the co-leads in the superhero film Madame Web (2024). In December 2024, it was announced that they would appear in Scream 7.

== Personal life ==
O'Connor is an advocate for improving diversity and representation in the entertainment industry. O'Connor is non-binary and uses they/them pronouns.

== Filmography ==
Celeste O'Connor film work
Year	Title	Role	Notes
2017	Wetlands	Amy Johnson	
2018	Irreplaceable You	Teen Abbie	
2019	Selah and the Spades	Paloma Davis	
2020	Freaky	Nyla Chones	
2021	Ghostbusters: Afterlife	Lucky Domingo	
2022	The In Between	Shannon	
2023	A Good Person	Ryan	
2024	Madame Web	Mattie Franklin / Spider-Woman	
2024	Ghostbusters: Frozen Empire	Lucky Domingo	
2026	Scream 7	Chloe Parker	
