= Kiersey Clemons =

American actress

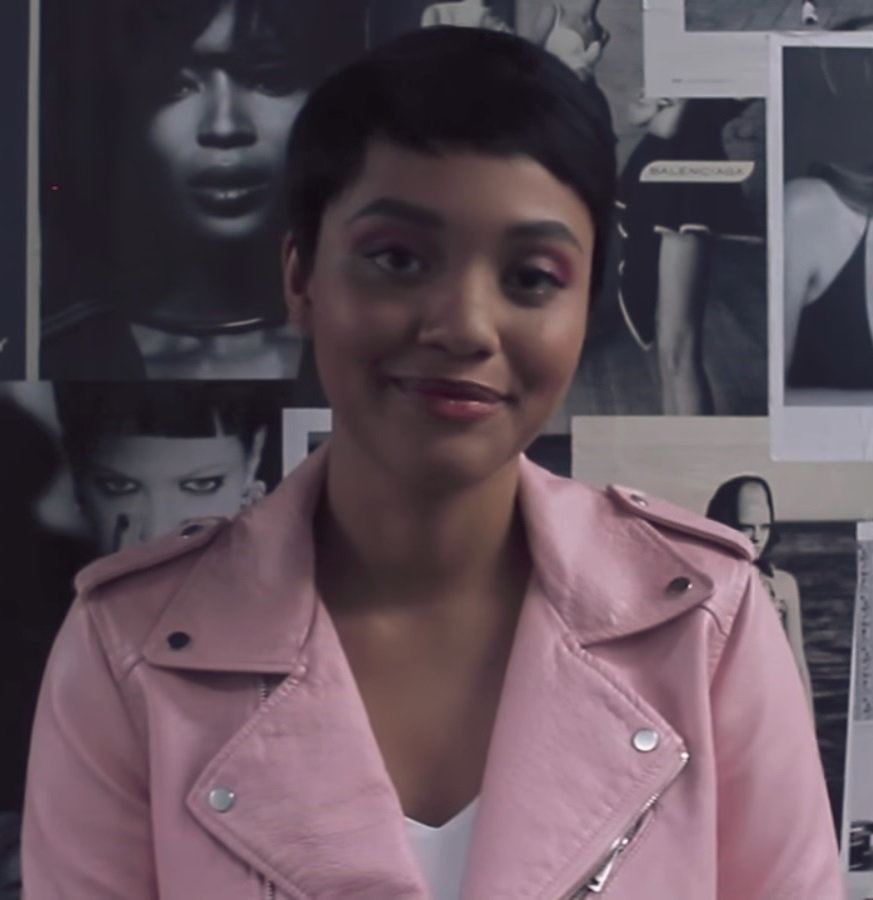
- Clemons in 2016
- Born: Kiersey Nicole Clemons; December 17, 1993 (age 32); Pensacola, Florida, U.S.
- Occupations: Actress; singer
- Years active: 2010–present

Kiersey Nicole Clemons (born December 17, 1993) is an American actress. She is known for her role in the 2015 comedy-drama film Dope, playing Cassandra "Diggy" Andrews. Subsequently, she went on to co-star in Neighbors 2: Sorority Rising (2016), Flatliners (2017), Hearts Beat Loud (2018), and played Iris West in both Zack Snyder's Justice League (2021) and The Flash (2023).

Clemons had recurring roles in numerous television series, including Austin & Ally (2013), Transparent (2014–2015), Extant (2015), and Easy (2016–2019), and had a main role in the final season of the comedy series Angie Tribeca (2018).

== Early life ==
Clemons was born on December 17, 1993, in Pensacola, Florida. She grew up in Redondo Beach, California. Clemons is biracial, of African-American and white heritage.

== Career ==
Early in her career, Clemons portrayed a recurring character in the Disney Channel series Austin & Ally as Kira Starr. She also appeared in the Disney Channel original film Cloud 9. Clemons guest-starred in the crime-drama series CSI: Crime Scene Investigation. In 2014, she appeared in Trey Songz's music video for "SmartPhones" and "What's Best for You" in which she played his love interest who catches him in the act of cheating via phone call.

From 2014 to 2015, Clemons played Bianca in the comedy series Transparent. She also had a starring role on the MTV original series Eye Candy as Sophia. The series only aired for one season. She guest starred in a 2015 episode of New Girl as Winston's love interest, KC. Clemons appeared in Lady Gaga's music video for "Til It Happens to You", and in DJ Snake's music video for "Middle" alongside Josh Hutcherson. In 2016, Clemons played Beth in the comedy film Neighbors 2: Sorority Rising. She also played Chase, a grad student from Chicago, in episodes of the Netflix original series Easy. In 2016, Clemons was cast as Iris West in the action film The Flash, but the project was delayed due to the departure of director Rick Famuyiwa. Despite this, she was still slated to appear in the Justice League film as the same character, but her scenes were ultimately cut from the theatrical release. In 2021, Clemons' cut scenes from the 2017 Justice League movie was eventually released in Zack Snyder's Justice League. In March 2021, Clemons closed a deal to appear as Iris West in The Flash, now directed by Andy Muschietti.

In 2017, Clemons co-starred with Callum Turner in the drama The Only Living Boy in New York, and with Elliot Page in the horror remake Flatliners. In 2018, Clemons co-starred with Nick Offerman in musical comedy-drama Hearts Beat Loud. She received the Atlanta Film Festival's inaugural Phoenix Award for Hearts Beat Loud in April 2018. In 2019, she co-starred with Thomas Mann in the live-action remake musical romance Lady and the Tramp. In 2020, Clemons voiced Dee Dee Skyes in the Scooby-Doo film Scoob!

== Personal life ==
Clemons is queer. She is in a relationship with Ebony De La Haye, an Australian stunt double. The couple met during filming of Sweetheart, where De La Haye doubled Clemons during action sequences.

Clemons is diagnosed with bipolar disorder and struggled with the illness, especially before she was formally diagnosed.

== Filmography ==
Key
| † | Denotes works that have not yet been released |

=== Film ===
| Year | Title | Role | Notes |
|---|---|---|---|
| 2015 | Dope | Cassandra "Diggy" Andrews | |
| 2016 | Neighbors 2: Sorority Rising | Beth Gladstone | |
| 2017 | Flatliners | Sophia Manning | |
| 2017 | The Only Living Boy in New York | Mimi Pastori | |
| 2018 | Little Bitches | Marisa | |
| 2018 | Hearts Beat Loud | Samantha Lee “Sam” Fisher | |
| 2018 | An L.A. Minute | Velocity | Also co-producer |
| 2019 | Sweetheart | Jennifer "Jenn: Remming | |
| 2019 | Lady and the Tramp | Darling | |
| 2020 | Scoob! | Dee Dee Skyes | Voice role |
| 2020 | Antebellum | Julia | |
| 2021 | Asking for It | Joey | |
| 2021 | Zack Snyder's Justice League | Iris West | |
| 2022 | Am I OK? | Brittany | |
| 2022 | Susie Searches | Susie | |
| 2023 | Somebody I Used to Know | Cassidy | |
| 2023 | The Young Wife | Celestina | |
| 2023 | The Flash | Iris West | |
| 2025 | For Worse | Maria | |

=== Television ===
| Year | Title | Role | Notes |
|---|---|---|---|
| 2010 | Shake It Up | Danielle | 2 episodes |
| 2011 | Bucket & Skinner's Epic Adventures | Summer | Episode: "Epic Wingman" |
| 2011 | Good Luck Charlie | Alicia | Episode: "The Bob Duncan Experience" |
| 2013 | CSI: Crime Scene Investigation | Gwen Onetta | Episode: "Frame by Frame" |
| 2013 | Austin & Ally | Kira Starr | Recurring role (seasons 2–3) |
| 2013 | What's Next for Sarah? | Oli | 2 episodes |
| 2014 | Cloud 9 | Skye Sailor | Disney Channel Original Movie |
| 2014–2015 | Transparent | Bianca | Recurring role |
| 2015 | Eye Candy | Sophia Preston | Main role |
| 2015 | Extant | Lucy | Recurring role (season 2) |
| 2015 | Comedy Bang! Bang! | Waitress | Episode: "Brie Larson Wears a Billowy Long-Sleeve Shirt and White Saddle Shoes" |
| 2015–2016 | New Girl | KC | 2 episodes |
| 2016–2019 | Easy | Chase | 4 episodes |
| 2017 | Michael Jackson's Halloween | Victoria | Television film; voice role |
| 2018 | Angie Tribeca | Maria Charo | Main role (season 4) |
| 2019 | BoJack Horseman | Jameson H. | Voice role; episode: "A Horse Walks into a Rehab" |
| 2019 | Rent: Live | Joanne Jefferson | Television film |
| 2021 | Red Bird Lane | Jane | Unaired TV movie |
| 2021–2022 | Fairfax | Derica | Voice role; 15 episodes |
| 2023 | Swarm | Rashida | Episode: "Only God Makes Happy Endings" |
| 2023 | Praise Petey | Eliza | Voice role; 10 episodes |
| 2023–present | Monarch: Legacy of Monsters | May Olowe-Hewitt / Corah Mateo | Main role |

=== Music videos ===
| Year | Title | Artist(s) | Role | Notes |
|---|---|---|---|---|
| 2014 | "SmartPhones" | Trey Songz | Girlfriend | |
| 2015 | "Til It Happens to You" | Lady Gaga | Avery | |
| 2016 | "Middle" | DJ Snake ft. Bipolar Sunshine | Superhero | |

| Preceded by Vernee Watson-Johnson | Voice of Dee Dee Skyes; 2020 film Scoob! | Succeeded by Niccole Thurman |
