= Sam Slater (film producer) =

Real estate developer

- Born: Samuel Slater; West Palm Beach, FL
- Education: MPA, Suffolk University; BA, George Washington University
- Occupations: Real estate developer film producer entrepreneur

Sam Slater is a Boston-based film producer, real estate developer, and minority owner of the Seattle Kraken of the National Hockey League and the Memphis Grizzlies of the National Basketball Association.

== Education and career ==
Slater earned his Bachelor of Arts in History at George Washington University in Washington, DC and received his Master's degree in Public Administration from Suffolk University.

Slater is the managing partner of Tremont Asset Management, the real estate subsidiary of his family's firm Slater Family Holdings. He is a minority owner of the Seattle Kraken and the Memphis Grizzlies also co-founded a Hollywood production company Burn Later Productions with Paul Bernon and produced over 40 films including Drinking Buddies, Adult Beginners. and Results, a feature-length romantic comedy.

Slater was nominated by President Biden in 2021 to serve on the board of the Metropolitan Washington Airports Authority. Slater did work for Biden's 2020 presidential campaign and according to Federal Elections Commission data contributed nearly $140,000 to Biden's campaign individually.

Slater bought Playboy’s “Big Bunny” private plane in 2022. He is developing an apartment tower in the Fenway neighborhood of Boston and other apartment buildings in Quincy MA.

== Recognition ==
- Ranked on Boston’s 150 Most Influential Bostonians of 2023.
- Received the 2017 Hope Award at the Ellie Fund’s 5 for Ellie Spring Fashion Show.
- Ranked on Boston’s 150 Most Influential Bostonians of 2024.
