= 31st Screen Actors Guild Awards =

- Official poster
- Description: Outstanding motion picture and primetime television performances
- Date: February 23, 2025
- Location: Shrine Auditorium and Expo Hall, Los Angeles, California
- Country: United States
- Presented by: SAG-AFTRA
- Hosted by: Kristen Bell
- Preshow hosts: Lilly Singh; Sasheer Zamata

Highlights
- Most awards: Film; N/A; Television; Shōgun (4)
- Most nominations: Film; Wicked (5); Television; Shōgun (5)
- Website: www.actorawards.org

Television/radio coverage
- Network: Netflix

The 31st Annual Screen Actors Guild Awards, honoring the best achievements in film and television performances for the year 2024, were presented on February 23, 2025, at the Shrine Auditorium and Expo Hall in Los Angeles, California. For the second year in a row, the ceremony streamed live on Netflix, starting at 8:00 p.m. EST / 5:00 p.m. PST.

Actress Kristen Bell hosted the ceremony for the second time since the 24th ceremony in 2018.

The nominations were originally scheduled to be announced live in-person on January 8, 2025, but were postponed due to a series of wildfires in Southern California. Instead, the nominees were announced via press release on the awards' official website.

Jane Fonda was announced as the 2024 SAG Life Achievement Award recipient on October 17, 2024.

David Chang served as executive chef for the event.

== Winners and nominees ==
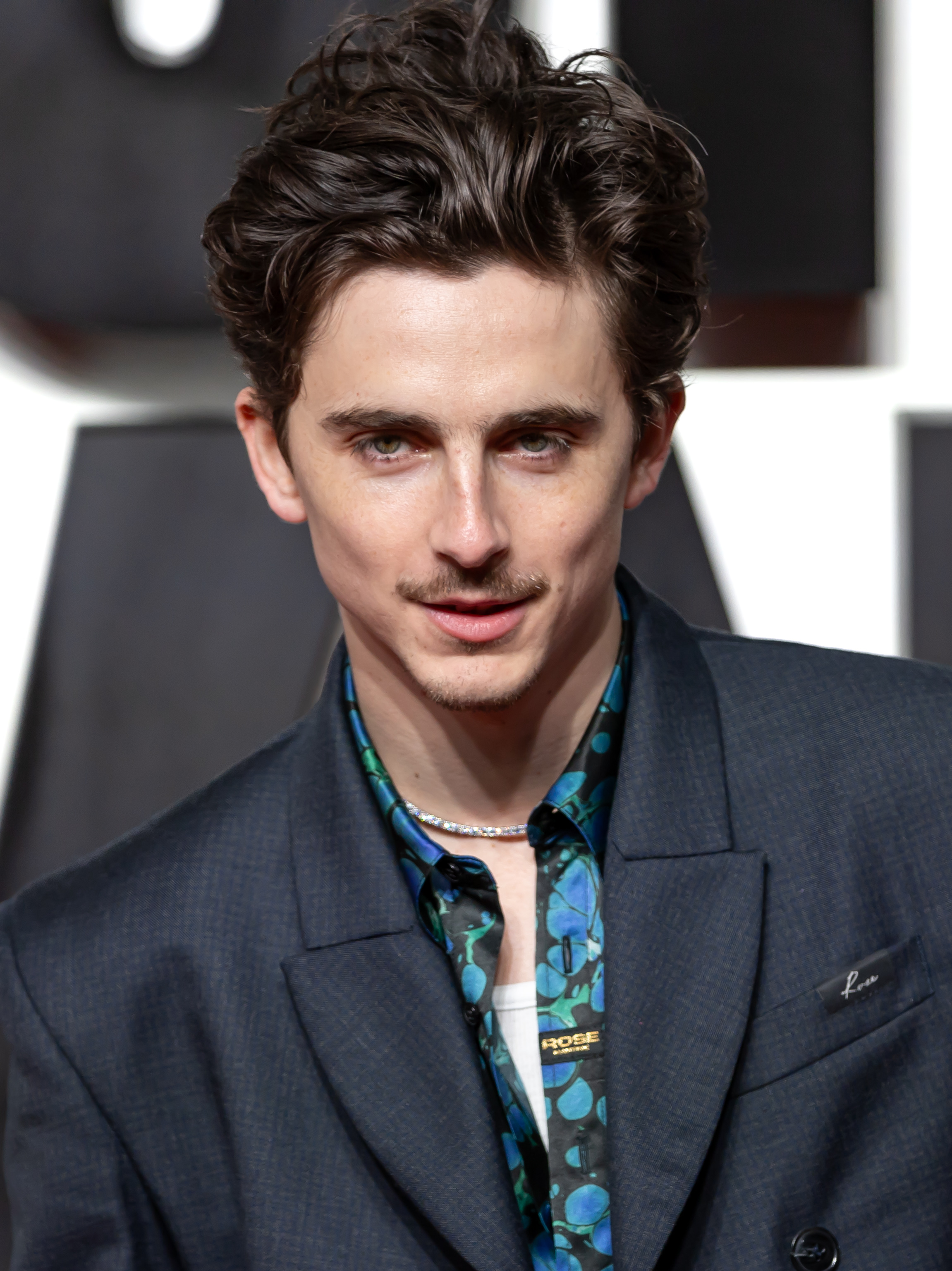
Timothée Chalamet, Outstanding Performance by a Male Actor in a Leading Role winner

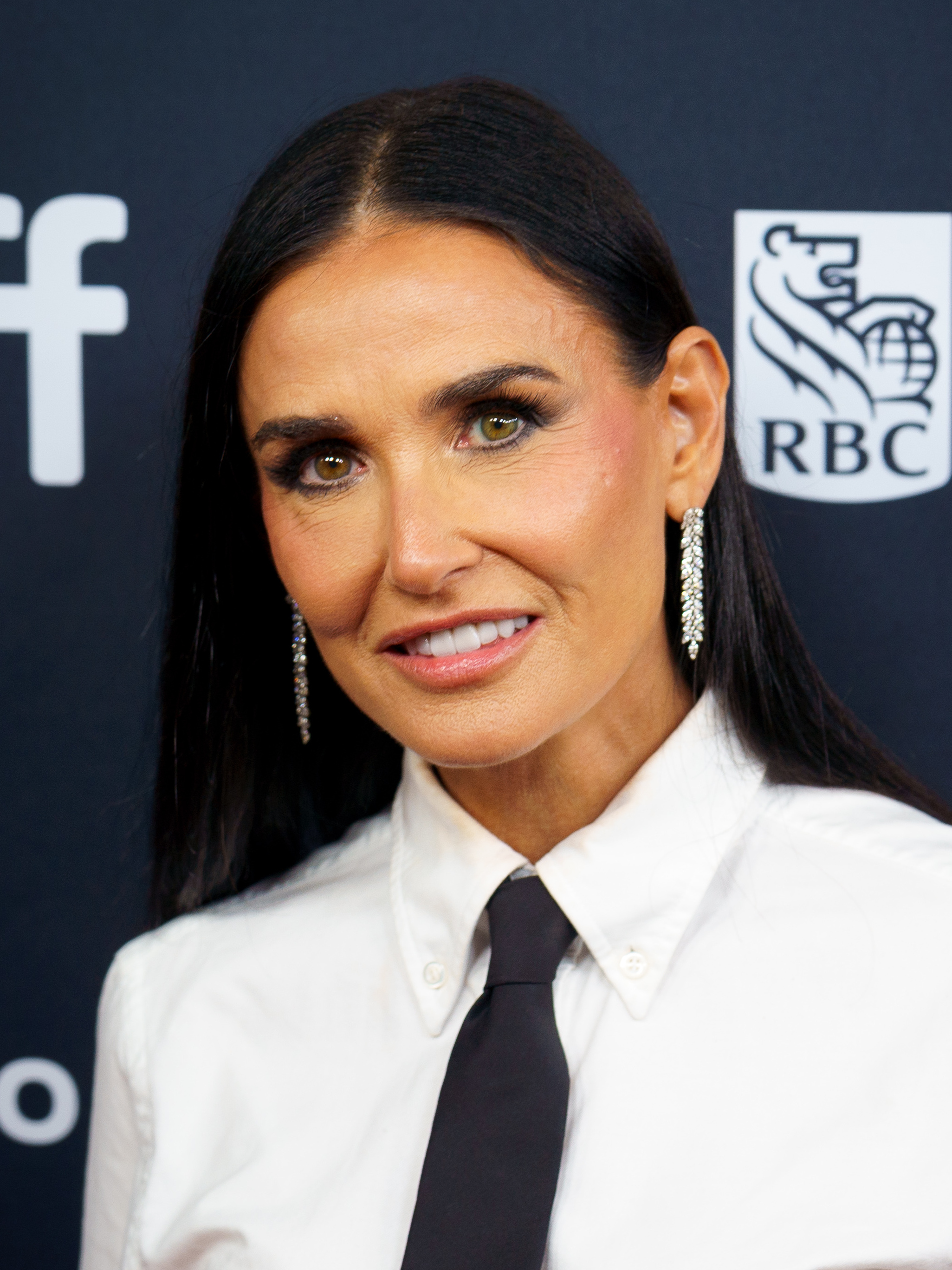
Demi Moore, Outstanding Performance by a Female Actor in a Leading Role winner

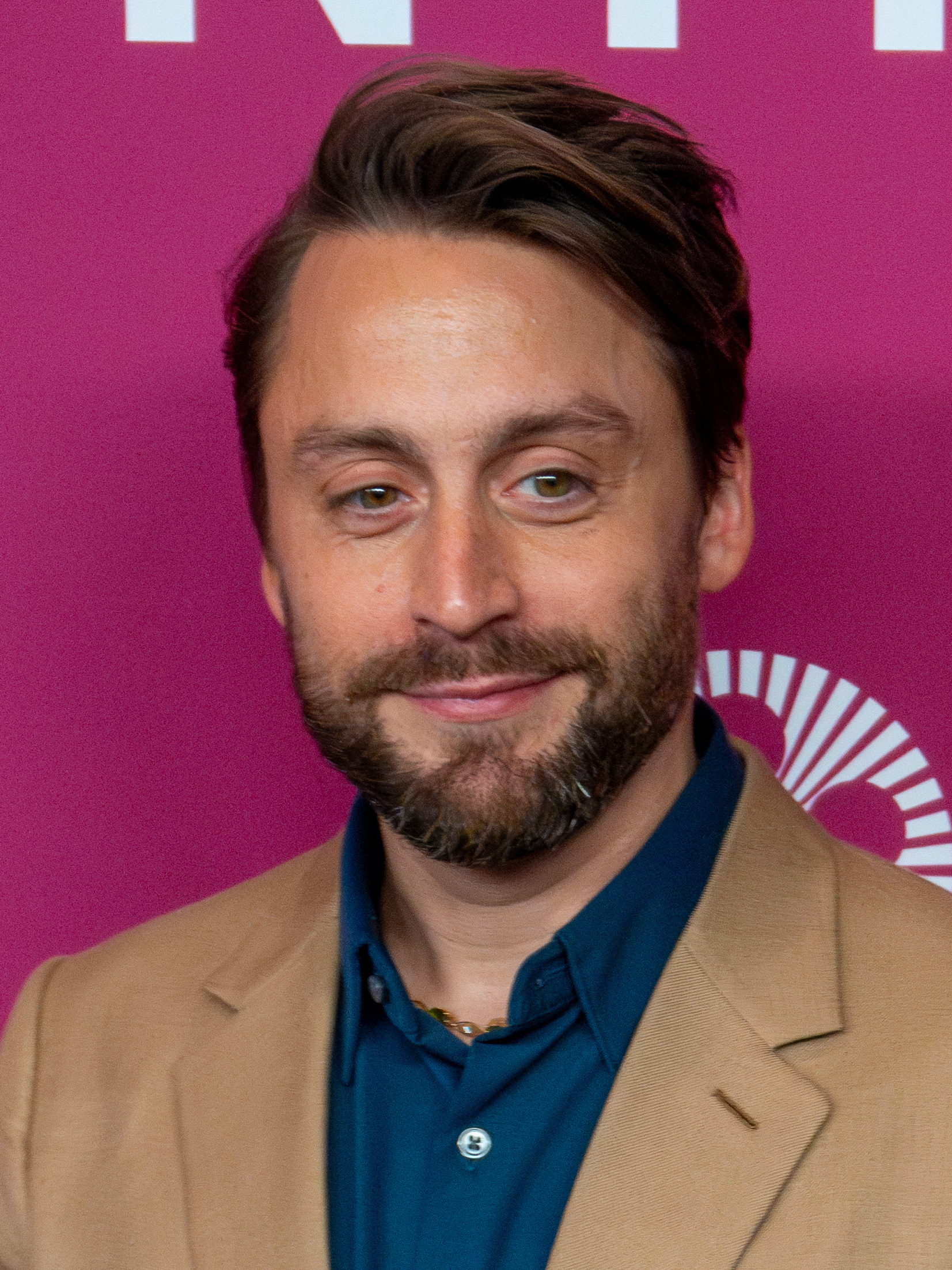
Kieran Culkin, Outstanding Performance by a Male Actor in a Supporting Role winner

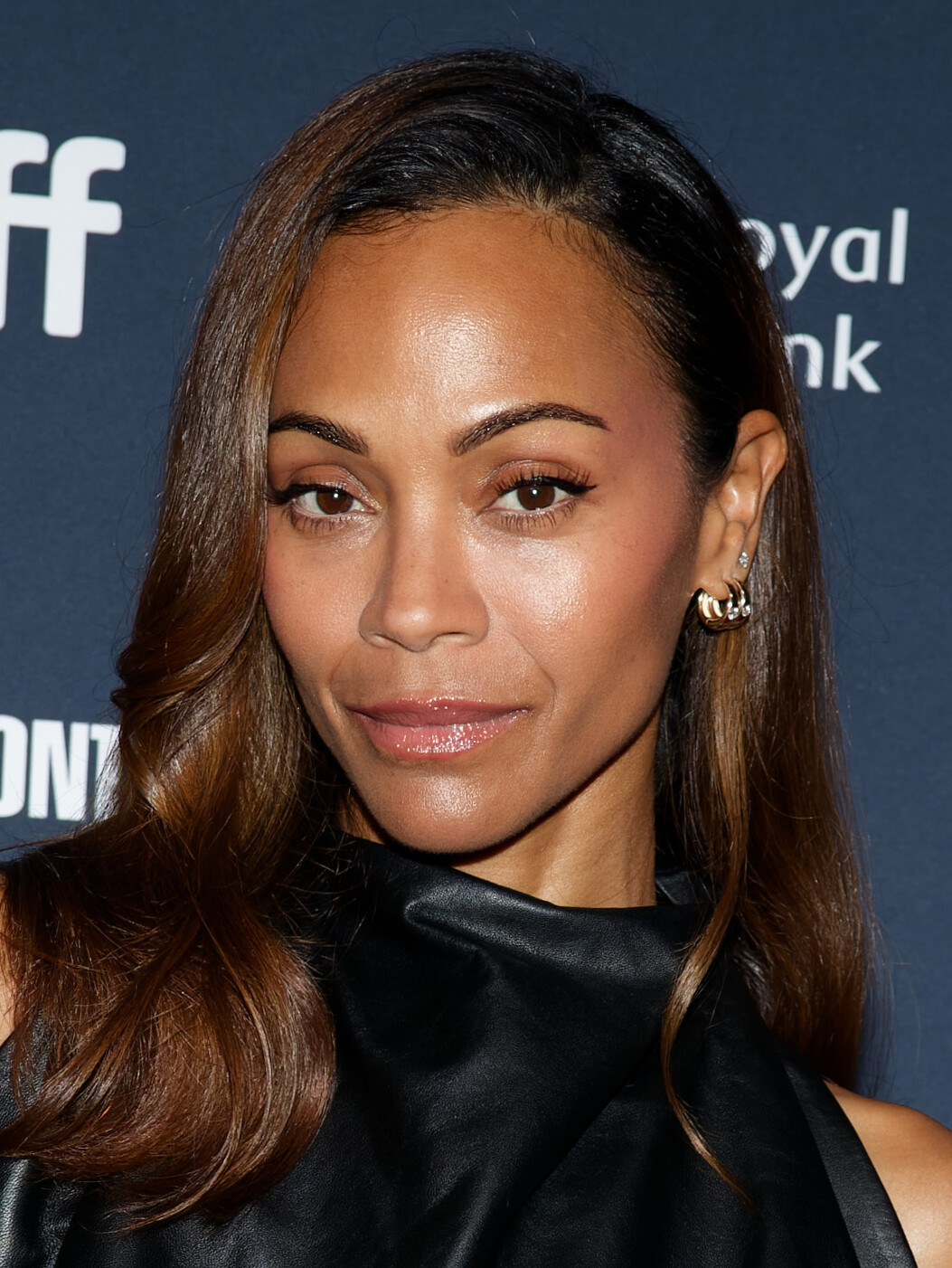
Zoe Saldaña, Outstanding Performance by a Female Actor in a Supporting Role winner

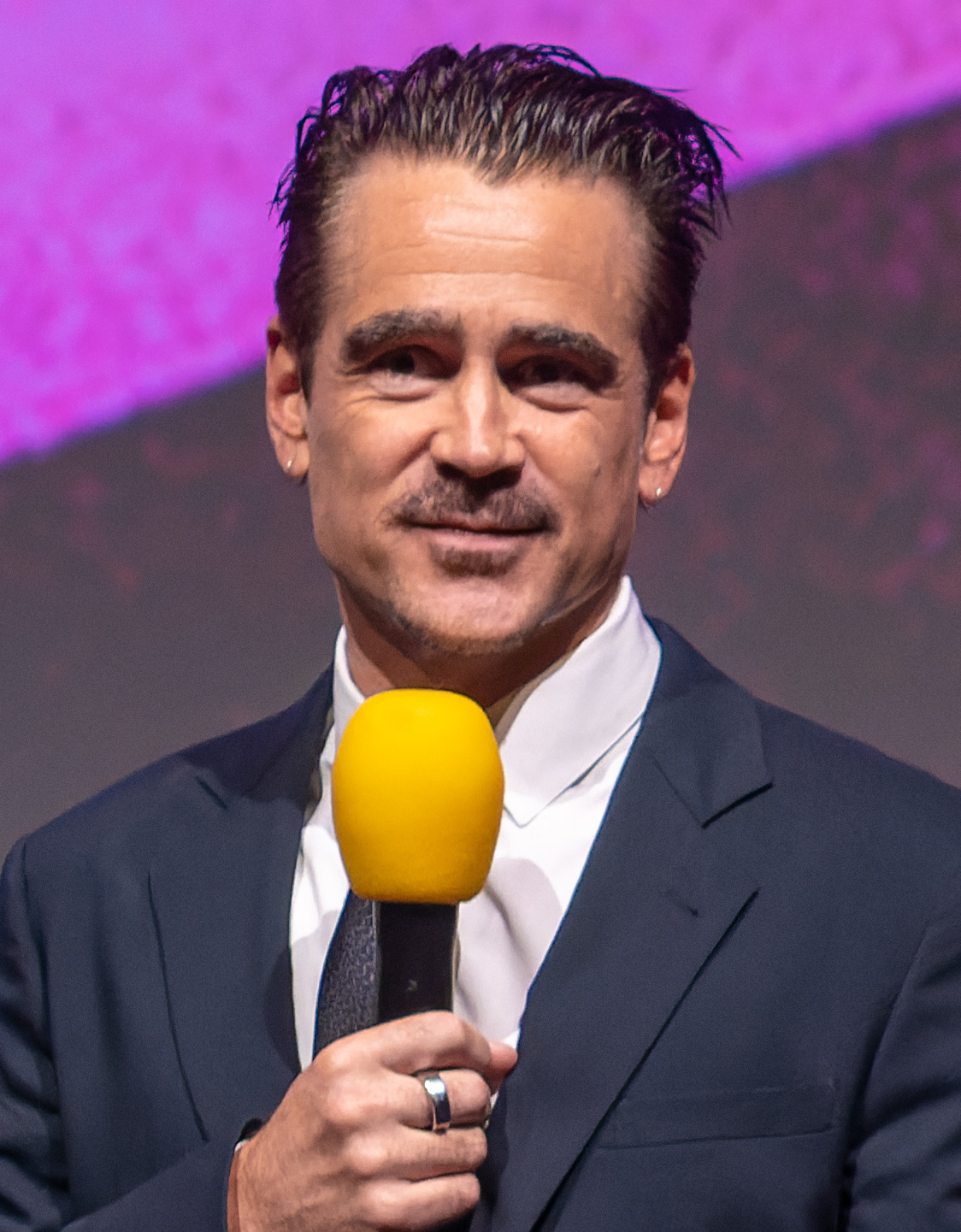
Colin Farrell, Outstanding Performance by a Male Actor in a Television Movie or Limited Series winner

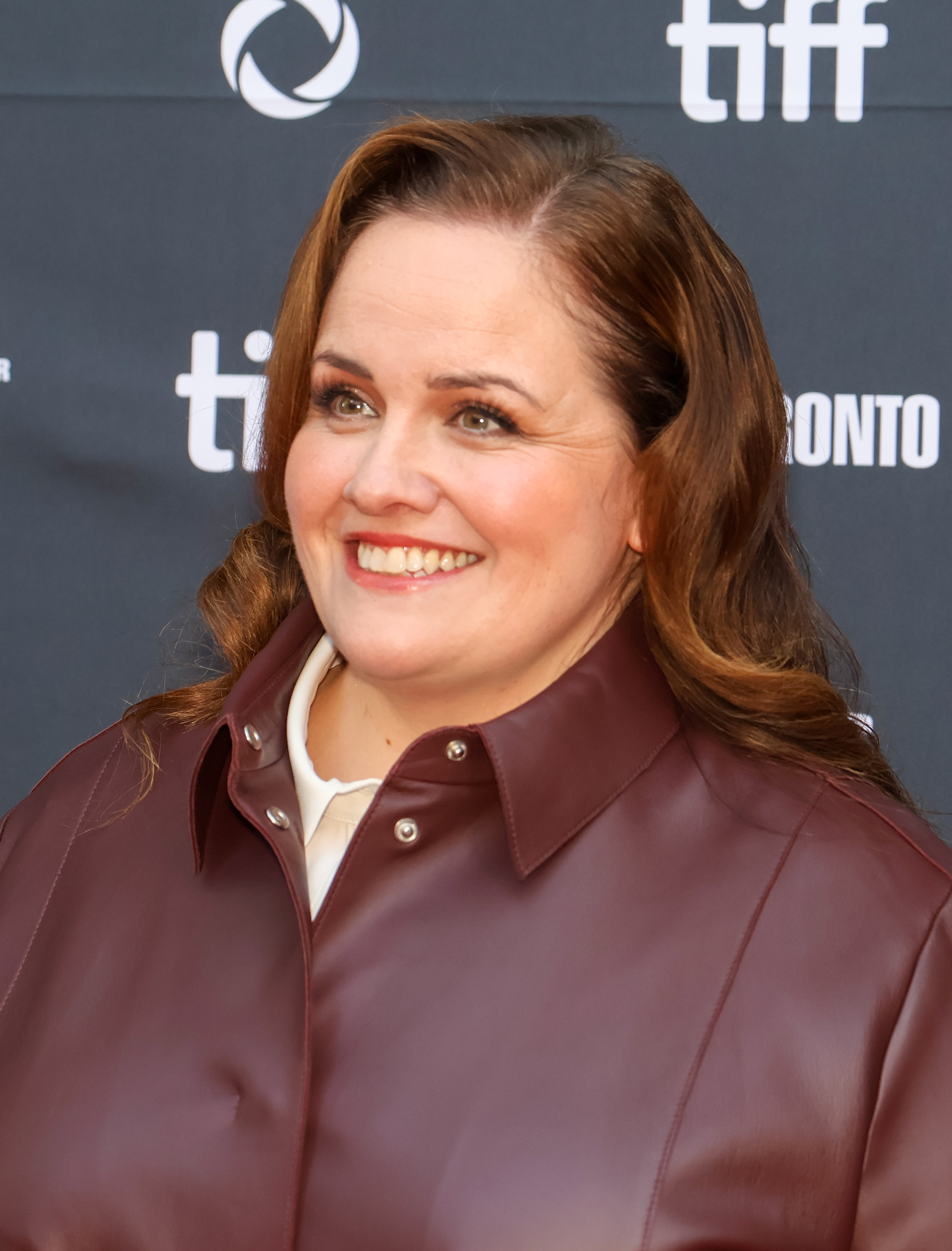
Jessica Gunning, Outstanding Performance by a Female Actor in a Television Movie or Limited Series winner

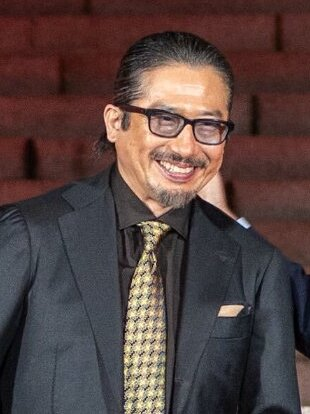
Hiroyuki Sanada, Outstanding Performance by a Male Actor in a Drama Series winner

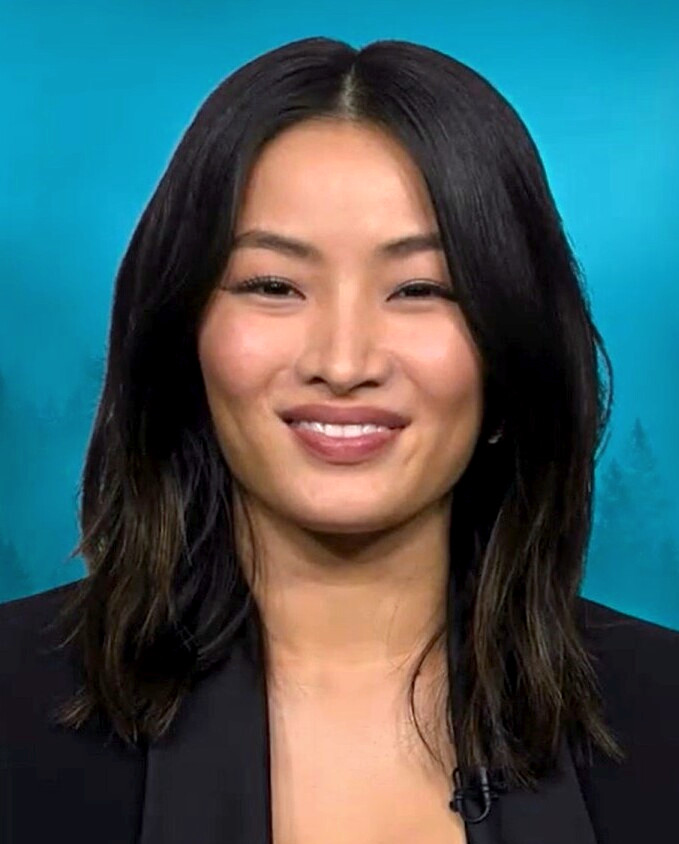
Anna Sawai, Outstanding Performance by a Female Actor in a Drama Series winner

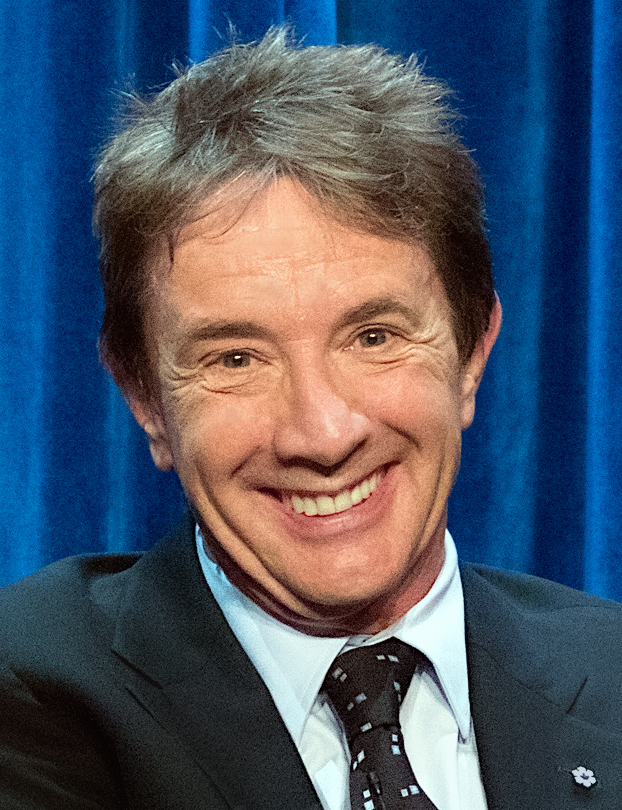
Martin Short, Outstanding Performance by a Male Actor in a Comedy Series winner

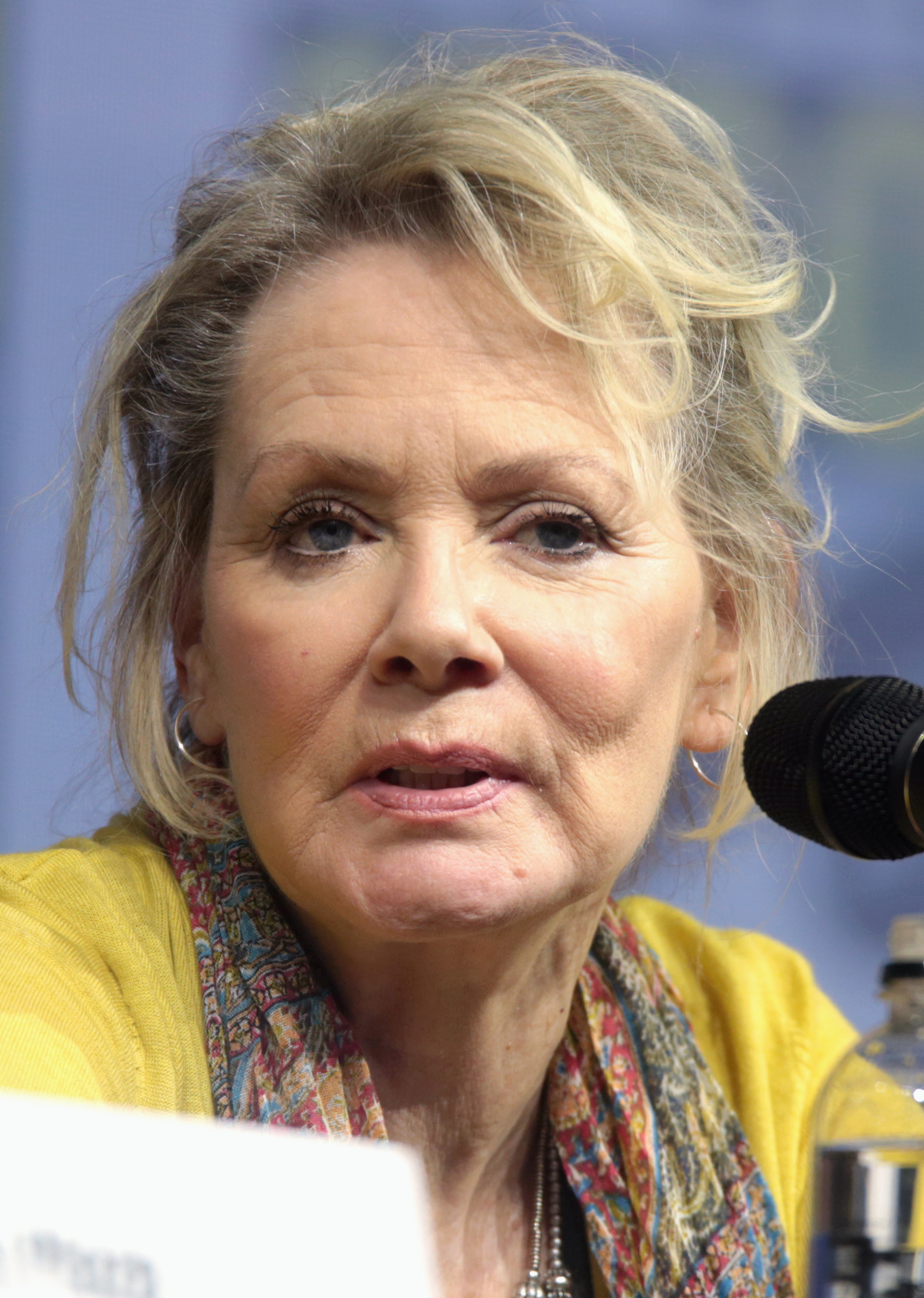
Jean Smart, Outstanding Performance by a Female Actor in a Comedy Series winner

=== Film ===
Outstanding Performance by a Male Actor in a Leading Role: Timothée Chalamet – A Complete Unknown as Bob Dylan; Adrien Brody – The Brutalist as László Tóth; Daniel Craig – Queer as William Lee; Colman Domingo – Sing Sing as John "Divine G" Whitfield; Ralph Fiennes – Conclave as Cardinal Thomas Lawrence	Outstanding Performance by a Female Actor in a Leading Role: Demi Moore – The Substance as Elisabeth Sparkle; Pamela Anderson – The Last Showgirl as Shelly Gardner; Cynthia Erivo – Wicked as Elphaba Thropp; Karla Sofía Gascón – Emilia Pérez as Emilia Pérez / Juan "Manitas" Del Monte; Mikey Madison – Anora as Anora "Ani" Mikheeva
Outstanding Performance by a Male Actor in a Supporting Role: Kieran Culkin – A Real Pain as Benji Kaplan; Jonathan Bailey – Wicked as Fiyero; Yura Borisov – Anora as Igor; Edward Norton – A Complete Unknown as Pete Seeger; Jeremy Strong – The Apprentice as Roy Cohn	Outstanding Performance by a Female Actor in a Supporting Role: Zoe Saldaña – Emilia Pérez as Rita Mora Castro; Monica Barbaro – A Complete Unknown as Joan Baez; Jamie Lee Curtis – The Last Showgirl as Annette; Danielle Deadwyler – The Piano Lesson as Berniece Charles; Ariana Grande – Wicked as Galinda "Glinda" Upland
Outstanding Performance by a Cast in a Motion Picture: Conclave – Sergio Castellitto, Ralph Fiennes, John Lithgow, Lucian Msamati, Isabella Rossellini, and Stanley Tucci; Anora – Yura Borisov, Mark Eydelshteyn, Karren Karagulian, Mikey Madison, Aleksei Serebryakov, and Vache Tovmasyan; A Complete Unknown – Monica Barbaro, Norbert Leo Butz, Timothée Chalamet, Elle Fanning, Dan Fogler, Will Harrison, Eriko Hatsune, Boyd Holbrook, Scoot McNairy, Big Bill Morganfield, and Edward Norton; Emilia Pérez – Karla Sofía Gascón, Selena Gomez, Adriana Paz, and Zoe Saldaña; Wicked – Jonathan Bailey, Marissa Bode, Peter Dinklage, Cynthia Erivo, Jeff Goldblum, Ariana Grande, Ethan Slater, Bowen Yang, and Michelle Yeoh
Outstanding Action Performance by a Stunt Ensemble in a Motion Picture: The Fall Guy; Deadpool & Wolverine; Dune: Part Two; Gladiator II; Wicked

=== Television ===
Outstanding Performance by a Male Actor in a Television Movie or Limited Series: Colin Farrell – The Penguin (HBO) as Oswald "Oz" Cobb / The Penguin; Javier Bardem – Monsters: The Lyle and Erik Menendez Story (Netflix) as José Menendez; Richard Gadd – Baby Reindeer (Netflix) as Donny Dunn; Kevin Kline – Disclaimer* (Apple TV+) as Stephen Brigstocke; Andrew Scott – Ripley (Netflix) as Tom Ripley	Outstanding Performance by a Female Actor in a Television Movie or Limited Series: Jessica Gunning – Baby Reindeer (Netflix) as Martha Scott; Kathy Bates – The Great Lillian Hall (HBO) as Edith Wilson; Cate Blanchett – Disclaimer* (Apple TV+) as Catherine Ravenscroft; Jodie Foster – True Detective: Night Country (HBO) as Chief Liz Danvers; Lily Gladstone – Under the Bridge (Hulu) as Cam Bentland; Cristin Milioti – The Penguin (HBO) as Sofia Falcone
Outstanding Performance by a Male Actor in a Drama Series: Hiroyuki Sanada – Shōgun (FX) as Lord Yoshii Toranaga; Tadanobu Asano – Shōgun (FX) as Kashigi Yabushige; Jeff Bridges – The Old Man (FX) as Dan Chase; Gary Oldman – Slow Horses (Apple TV+) as Jackson Lamb; Eddie Redmayne – The Day of the Jackal (Peacock) as The Jackal	Outstanding Performance by a Female Actor in a Drama Series: Anna Sawai – Shōgun (FX) as Toda Mariko; Kathy Bates – Matlock (CBS) as Madeline "Matty" Matlock / Madeline Kingston; Nicola Coughlan – Bridgerton (Netflix) as Penelope Bridgerton; Allison Janney – The Diplomat (Netflix) as Vice President Grace Penn; Keri Russell – The Diplomat (Netflix) as Katherine "Kate" Wyler
Outstanding Performance by a Male Actor in a Comedy Series: Martin Short – Only Murders in the Building (Hulu) as Oliver Putnam; Adam Brody – Nobody Wants This (Netflix) as Noah Roklov; Ted Danson – A Man on the Inside (Netflix) as Charles Nieuwendyk; Harrison Ford – Shrinking (Apple TV+) as Dr. Paul Rhoades; Jeremy Allen White – The Bear (FX / Hulu) as Carmen "Carmy" Berzatto	Outstanding Performance by a Female Actor in a Comedy Series: Jean Smart – Hacks (Max) as Deborah Vance; Kristen Bell – Nobody Wants This (Netflix) as Joanne; Quinta Brunson – Abbott Elementary (ABC) as Janine Teagues; Liza Colón-Zayas – The Bear (FX / Hulu) as Tina Marrero; Ayo Edebiri – The Bear (FX / Hulu) as Sydney Adamu
Outstanding Performance by an Ensemble in a Drama Series: Shōgun (FX) – Shinnosuke Abe, Tadanobu Asano, Tommy Bastow, Takehiro Hira, Moeka Hoshi, Hiromoto Ida, Cosmo Jarvis, Hiroto Kanai, Yuki Kura, Takeshi Kurokawa, Fumi Nikaido, Tokuma Nishioka, Hiroyuki Sanada, and Anna Sawai; Bridgerton (Netflix) – Geraldine Alexander, Victor Alli, Adjoa Andoh, Julie Andrews, Lorraine Ashbourne, Simone Ashley, Jonathan Bailey, Joe Barnes, Joanna Bobin, James Bryan, Harriet Cains, Bessie Carter, Genevieve Chenneour, Dominic Coleman, Nicola Coughlan, Kitty Devlin, Hannah Dodd, Daniel Francis, Ruth Gemmell, Rosa Hesmondhalgh, Sesley Hope, Florence Hunt, Martins Imhangbe, Molly Jackson-Shaw, Claudia Jessie, Lorn Macdonald, Jessica Madsen, Emma Naomi, Hannah New, Luke Newton, Caleb Obediah, James Phoon, Vineeta Rishi, Golda Rosheuvel, Hugh Sachs, Banita Sandhu, Luke Thompson, Will Tilston, Polly Walker, Anna Wilson-Jones, and Sophie Woolley; The Day of the Jackal (Peacock) – Khalid Abdalla, Jon Arias, Nick Blood, Úrsula Corberó, Charles Dance, Ben Hall, Chukwudi Iwuji, Patrick Kennedy, Puchi Lagarde, Lashana Lynch, Eleanor Matsuura, Jonjo O'Neill, Eddie Redmayne, Sule Rimi, and Lia Williams; The Diplomat (Netflix) – Ali Ahn, Sandy Amon-Schwartz, Tim Delap, Penny Downie, Ato Essandoh, David Gyasi, Celia Imrie, Rory Kinnear, Pearl Mackie, Nana Mensah, Graham Miller, Keri Russell, Rufus Sewell, Adam Silver, and Kenichiro Thomson; Slow Horses (Apple TV+) – Ruth Bradley, Tom Brooke, James Callis, Christopher Chung, Aimee-Ffion Edwards, Rosalind Eleazar, Sean Gilder, Kadiff Kirwan, Jack Lowden, Gary Oldman, Jonathan Pryce, Saskia Reeves, Joanna Scanlan, Kristin Scott Thomas, Hugo Weaving, Naomi Wirthner, and Tom Wozniczka
Outstanding Performance by an Ensemble in a Comedy Series: Only Murders in the Building (Hulu) – Michael Cyril Creighton, Zach Galifianakis, Selena Gomez, Richard Kind, Eugene Levy, Eva Longoria, Steve Martin, Kumail Nanjiani, Molly Shannon, and Martin Short; Abbott Elementary (ABC) – Quinta Brunson, William Stanford Davis, Janelle James, Chris Perfetti, Sheryl Lee Ralph, Lisa Ann Walter, and Tyler James Williams; The Bear (FX / Hulu) – Lionel Boyce, Liza Colón-Zayas, Ayo Edebiri, Abby Elliott, Edwin Lee Gibson, Corey Hendrix, Matty Matheson, Ebon Moss-Bachrach, Ricky Staffieri, and Jeremy Allen White; Hacks (Max) – Rose Abdoo, Carl Clemons-Hopkins, Paul W. Downs, Hannah Einbinder, Mark Indelicato, Jean Smart, and Megan Stalter; Shrinking (Apple TV+) – Harrison Ford, Brett Goldstein, Devin Kawaoka, Gavin Lewis, Wendie Malick, Lukita Maxwell, Ted McGinley, Christa Miller, Jason Segel, Rachel Stubington, Luke Tennie, Michael Urie, and Jessica Williams
Outstanding Action Performance by a Stunt Ensemble in a Television Series: Shōgun (FX); The Boys (Prime Video); Fallout (Prime Video); House of the Dragon (HBO); The Penguin (HBO)

=== Screen Actors Guild Life Achievement Award ===
- Jane Fonda

== In Memoriam ==
The "In Memoriam" segment paid tribute to actors who died in 2024 and early 2025. Introduced by Lisa Kudrow, it honored individuals such as Shannen Doherty, Shelley Duvall, Olivia Hussey, James Earl Jones, Richard Lewis, Bob Newhart, and Donald Sutherland. Several international actors were also included; among them were Alain Delon, Marianne Faithfull, and Maggie Smith.

- Bob Newhart
- Olivia Hussey
- Tony Todd
- Mitzi Gaynor
- Alan Rachins
- Leslie Charleson
- Muni Zano
- Kenneth Mitchell
- Leslie Shreve
- M. Emmet Walsh
- Janis Paige
- Charles Cyphers
- Marianne Faithfull
- Dabney Coleman
- James B. Sikking
- Terry Carter
- Mitzi McCall
- Earl Holliman
- David Harris
- Dayle Haddon
- Hudson Meek
- Patti Yasutake
- Wayne Northrop
- Drake Hogestyn
- Ken Page
- Morgan Lofting
- Ron Ely
- Peter Marshall
- Susan Backlinie
- Charles Dierkop
- Art Evans
- Alain Delon
- Michael Cole
- Shannen Doherty
- Bill Cobbs
- Kris Kristofferson
- Tony Ganios
- Darryl Hickman
- Barbara Rush
- Joan Plowright
- Bernard Hill
- John Aprea
- Tony Roberts
- David Westberg
- John Amos
- Kevin Brophy
- Mort Drescher
- Tony Mordente
- Steve Lawrence
- Gavin Creel
- Louis Gossett Jr.
- Linda Lavin
- Richard Lewis
- Erica Ash
- Joe Flaherty
- Martin Mull
- Nicholas Pryor
- Gena Rowlands
- John Ashton
- Bob Uecker
- Tony Lo Bianco
- Teri Garr
- David Lynch
- Jeannie Epper
- Kim Kahana
- Johnny Wactor
- Shelley Duvall
- James Darren
- Tom Bower
- Donald Sutherland
- Maggie Smith
- James Earl Jones

Some notable omissions included Susan Buckner, Thom Christopher, and Chance Perdomo.

== Presenters ==
The following individuals, listed in order of appearance, presented the following categories:

Presenters
Name(s)	Role
Mikey Madison; Bowen Yang; Jessica Williams; Jodie Foster	"I Am An Actor" segment
Pamela Anderson	Presented Outstanding Performance by a Male Actor in a Supporting Role
Millie Bobby Brown; Drew Starkey	Presented Outstanding Performance by a Female Actor in a Drama Series
Timothée Chalamet; Monica Barbaro; Elle Fanning; Edward Norton	Presented the film A Complete Unknown on the Outstanding Performance by a Cast in a Motion Picture segment
Quinta Brunson; Andrew Scott	Presented Outstanding Performance by a Male Actor in a Drama Series
Mikey Madison; Yura Borisov; Mark Eydelshteyn	Presented the film Anora on the Outstanding Performance by a Cast in a Motion Picture segment
Kumail Nanjiani; Molly Shannon	Presented Outstanding Performance by a Female Actor in a Comedy Series
Joey King; Jack Quaid	Presented Outstanding Performance by a Male Actor in a Comedy Series
Zoe Saldaña; Selena Gomez	Presented the film Emilia Pérez on the Outstanding Performance by a Cast in a Motion Picture segment
Keri Russell; Kerry Washington	Presented Outstanding Performance by a Female Actor in a Miniseries or Television Movie
Jamie Lee Curtis	Presented Outstanding Performance by a Male Actor in a Miniseries or Television Movie
Julia Louis-Dreyfus	Presented the Screen Actors Guild Life Achievement Award for Jane Fonda
Colman Domingo; Keke Palmer	Presented Outstanding Performance by a Female Actor in a Supporting Role
David Duchovny; Gillian Anderson	Presented Outstanding Performance by an Ensemble in a Drama Series
Fran Drescher	SAG-AFTRA President's remarks
Zooey Deschanel; Max Greenfield	Presented Outstanding Performance by an Ensemble in a Comedy Series
Ralph Fiennes; Isabella Rossellini; John Lithgow; Sergio Castellitto	Presented the film Conclave on the Outstanding Performance by a Cast in a Motion Picture segment
Lisa Kudrow	Presented the In Memoriam tribute
Cynthia Erivo; Ariana Grande; Marissa Bode	Presented the film Wicked on the Outstanding Performance by a Cast in a Motion Picture segment
Lily Gladstone; Michelle Yeoh	Presented Outstanding Performance by a Male Actor in a Leading Role
Colin Farrell	Presented Outstanding Performance by a Female Actor in a Leading Role
Harrison Ford	Presented Outstanding Performance by a Cast in a Motion Picture

== Multiple nominations ==
=== Film ===
Nominations	Film
5	Wicked
4	A Complete Unknown
3	Anora
3	Emilia Pérez
2	Conclave
2	The Last Showgirl

=== Television ===
Nominations	Series
5	Shōgun
3	The Bear
3	The Diplomat
3	The Penguin
2
2	Abbott Elementary
2	Baby Reindeer
2	Bridgerton
2	The Day of the Jackal
2	Disclaimer
2	Hacks
2	Nobody Wants This
2	Only Murders in the Building
2	Shrinking
2	Slow Horses

== Multiple wins ==
=== Television ===
Wins	Series
4	Shōgun
2	Only Murders in the Building
