= Jimmy Dunn (comedian) =

American stand-up comedian and actor

- Born: Beverly, Massachusetts, U.S.

Comedy career
- Years active: 1990s–present
- Medium: Stand-up, film, television
- Genres: Observational comedy, sketch comedy
- Website: www.jimmydunn.com

Jimmy Dunn (born) is an American stand-up comedian and actor. According to The Portsmouth Herald, he is known for his portrayal of the "big, loud, dumb guy". In 2014, he was cast in the CBS sitcom The McCarthys. Nine years later he joined the cast of the 2023 reboot of Frasier on Paramount+. He grew up in Beverly, Massachusetts, and attributed his roles in these shows - in part - to his Boston roots, where both shows are set. Other factors include his experience in playing "chubby and dim" characters, which he described as his main strength. He currently resides in Hampton, New Hampshire.

== Filmography ==
- Mint Condition (2001) - Muscle Car Guy
- Stuck on You (2003) - Beverly Hills Police Jailbird
- Partners (2013) - Duffy
- The McCarthys (2014–2015) - Sean McCarthy
- Entertainment Tonight (2014) - Himself
- The Talk (2014) - Himself
- Quiet on the Set (2014) - Himself
- TMI Hollywood (2017) - Host, Various
- Love (2018)
- Frasier (2023) - Moose
