= Brian Gallivan =

American actor, writer and comedian

- Born: Dedham, Massachusetts, United States
- Occupation: Actor/Comedian/Writer

Brian Gallivan is an American actor, writer and comedian. He gained significant attention for his Second City Network web series Sassy Gay Friend, based on a character he created in 2004 Second City mainstage revue Red Scare. The series shows events that may have transpired if famous women (and a few men) in literature, film, and history had been advised by the titular character.

== Career ==
Gallivan got his start improvising in his hometown of Boston as well as performing at the Bambi Masterpiece Theater, before moving to Chicago in 2003, where he performed at The Second City between 2003 and 2007, appearing in four mainstage revues, including the long-running Between Barack and a Hard Place. He was twice nominated for Joseph Jefferson Awards for his work while there.

Gallivan appeared in the Matt Damon film The Informant! and in the Derek Westerman web series Bad Dads alongside Michael Cera. Gallivan appeared in the feature film A Thousand Words.

Gallivan was a writer on the NBC sitcom Are You There, Chelsea? and the ABC comedy series Happy Endings.

For the 2014–15 television season, Gallivan created and produced the CBS television sitcom The McCarthys, which was cancelled in early 2015.

== Personal life ==
Gallivan is gay. He is from Dedham, Massachusetts.

== Filmography ==
Film / Television
Year	Title	Role	Notes
2004	Disturbing Leonard	Intimidating Man At Urinal 2	(Short film)
2008	The Promotion	Banjo Player #1 (voice role)	(Film)
2009	The Informant!	Ron Henkoff	(Film)
2010	Sassy Gay Friend: Hamlet	Sassy Gay Friend	(Short film)
2010	AIDS: We Did It!	Unnamed role	(Short film)
2011	Childrens Hospital	Reporter 1	(TV Series), 1 episode: "The '70s Episode"
2011	Bad Dads	Jessica's Boyfriend	(Short film)
2011	Funny or Die Presents	Abraham Lincoln (segment "The Amazing Adventures of David and Jennie")	(TV Series), 1 episode: "Episode #2.3"
2012	The Intern	Brian	(Short film)
2012	The Last Supper	Unnamed role	(Short film)
2012	A Taste of Magic	Magician	(Short film)
2012	A Thousand Words	Tony	(Film)
2013	The Caterpillar's Kimono	Duncan	(Film)
2015	Marry Me	Flight Attendant	(TV Series), 1 episode: "Wake Me"
2016	The Boys at the Bar	Cuddle Bear	(Film)
2020	The Big Show Show	Principal Crowley	(TV Series), 1 episode: "The Big Surprise"
2020	Outmatched	Sebastian	(TV Series), 1 episode: "Royal Rumble"
2024	Shrinking	Stuart	(TV Series), 5 episodes
2026	Office Romance		(Film)

Other Notable Works
Year	Title	Role	Notes
2010–2012	Second City	Sassy Gay Friend	
