= The McCarthys =

- Genre: Sitcom
- Created by: Brian Gallivan
- Starring: Tyler Ritter; Joey McIntyre; Jimmy Dunn; Kelen Coleman; Jack McGee; Laurie Metcalf
- Composer: Gabriel Mann
- Country of origin: United States
- Original language: English
- No. of seasons: 1
- No. of episodes: 15

Production
- Executive producers: Brian Gallivan; Mike Sikowitz; Will Gluck; Richard Schwartz; Andy Ackerman
- Producer: Barbara Stoll
- Camera setup: Multi-camera
- Running time: 22 minutes
- Production companies: Loosely Inspired by Bambi Cottages Productions; Olive Bridge Entertainment; CBS Television Studios; Sony Pictures Television

Original release
- Network: CBS
- Release: October 30, 2014 – July 11, 2015

The McCarthys is an American sitcom television series created by Brian Gallivan, who also shares executive producer credits with Mike Sikowitz, Will Gluck, Richard Schwartz, and Andy Ackerman for CBS Television Studios and Sony Pictures Television. The series debuted on CBS during the 2014–15 television season, airing Thursdays at 9:30 pm (ET/PT)/8:30 pm (CT). It aired from October 30, 2014, to July 11, 2015.

On February 3, 2015, CBS pulled The McCarthys from the schedule after 11 episodes, with 4 unaired episodes left.

On May 8, 2015, CBS officially canceled the series after only one season. On June 12, 2015, it was announced that the remaining episodes would burn off on Saturday evenings, with two episodes per night beginning July 4, 2015. The series concluded on July 11, 2015, after one season and 15 episodes.

The entire series was released on DVD on March 16, 2017.

== Premise ==
The series revolves around the McCarthys, a close-knit working class Boston clan whose sports legacy runs deep. When outspoken father Arthur, a dedicated basketball coach for the fictional Cardinal Hennigan High School, decides to take his athletically challenged — and openly gay — son Ronny under his wing as his new assistant, the other siblings (who are more passionate about sports) start crying foul over their dad's choice.

== Cast ==
=== Main ===
- Tyler Ritter as Ronny McCarthy, a 29-year-old openly gay man and guidance counselor who must choose between a great opportunity to move to Rhode Island and an offer to work under his father as an assistant high school basketball coach
- Jimmy Dunn as Sean McCarthy, Arthur and Marjorie's son and the fraternal twin brother of Gerard
- Joey McIntyre as Gerard McCarthy, Arthur and Marjorie's son and the fraternal twin brother of Sean
- Kelen Coleman as Jackie McCarthy, Arthur and Marjorie's only daughter, who is single and pregnant
- Jack McGee as Arthur McCarthy, Marjorie's husband and father of four. He is the head basketball coach at a Catholic high school and wants to hire Ronny as his assistant.
- Laurie Metcalf as Marjorie McCarthy, a mother of four children. Her favorite is Ronny, with whom she watches The Good Wife.

=== Recurring ===
- Jessica St. Clair as Katrina, Gerard's annoying on-off girlfriend (later fiancée) whom Marjorie completely dislikes
- Kenny Ridwan as Jared

=== Notable guest stars ===
- Alyson Hannigan as Pam, Arthur & Marjorie's neighbor who rents their third floor
- John Ratzenberger as Charlie Ellis, the athletic director at the high school where Arthur works
- Jane Kaczmarek as Eileen, Marjorie's sister
- Brent Morin as Tommy, Jackie's former high school fling who comes out as gay
- Rick Fox as himself
- Jean Smart as Lydia, Katrina's mother
- David Alan Grier as Dr. Hugh Morris, Ronny's therapist

== Episodes ==
No.	Title	Directed by	Written by	Original release date	Prod. code	U.S. viewers (millions)
1	"Pilot"	Andy Ackerman	Brian Gallivan	October 30, 2014	100	8.08
Arthur has to hire a new assistant basketball coach after his previous assistant passes away. His athletically-inclined sons Sean and Gerard both think they are in line for the job, but Arthur shocks everyone by instead hiring his gay son Ronny, who is clueless about sports. Ronny, a guidance counselor, has been mulling over a job opportunity in Rhode Island, which looks even better after he learns of his dad's true motives for hiring him. He eventually accepts the coaching job and stays in town. Meanwhile, single daughter Jackie announces she is pregnant with the former assistant coach's baby.
2	"Love, McCarthys Style"	Anthony Rich	Gabe Miller & Jonathan Green	November 6, 2014	103	6.67
Ronny is dating a guy whose family shows so much affection toward each other, it makes him jealous. He lies and tells the guy his "loving" parents are having an elaborate anniversary party, even though they have planned no such thing. Ronny quickly improvises a party and tries to make a video of each parent saying something nice about how they met and fell in love, but neither Marjorie nor Arthur will cooperate.
3	"The Good Coach"	Pamela Fryman	Brian Gallivan	November 13, 2014	101	6.36
Ronny tries to learn more about basketball, wanting to be more than just his dad's "token gay hire". However, Arthur won't help, so Ronny takes lessons from another coach that Arthur despises. Ronny also upsets Marjorie when the lessons cause him to miss their weekly viewing of The Good Wife. Elsewhere, Gerard and Sean vie for a head coaching position that just opened at St. Paul's High School, while Jackie blows an interview for a sportscasting job by mentioning her pregnancy.
4	"Supporting Jackie"	Pamela Fryman	Kate Purdy	November 20, 2014	106	6.26
Jackie shares a list of things she can no longer eat, drink or do while pregnant. The family says they will also give up everything on the list as a show of support, but their commitment is short lived. Marjorie worries about aging, knowing that she will soon be a grandmother.
5	"Thanks a Lot, Ronny"	Pamela Fryman	Becky Mann & Audra Sielaff	November 27, 2014	104	5.33
Gerard is back together with his irritating ex-girlfriend, Katrina (Jessica St. Clair). After Ronny invites Katrina to Thanksgiving dinner against Marjorie's wishes, Mom forces Ronny to meet with Gerard and undo the invitation. Ronny only makes things worse when his conversation inspires Gerard to propose to Katrina.
6	"Why Guys Shouldn't Date a Sister's Ex"	Pamela Fryman	Mike Sikowitz	December 4, 2014	102	6.08
While dining with Arthur and Ronny, Marjorie is approached by Tommy (Brent Morin), a guy she always liked when he was dating Jackie in high school. Upon learning that Tommy is gay, Marjorie sets him up with Ronny, which doesn't go over well with Jackie when she finds out later. Meanwhile, it is the twins' birthday, and Gerard gets Sean a bottle of booze. Surprisingly, Sean has something much more creative for his brother -- he has "rented" former Boston Celtics player Rick Fox for the evening.
7	"Arthur and Marjorie's Night Apart"	Pamela Fryman	Gabe Miller & Jonathan Green	December 11, 2014	109	6.89
Marjorie is having gall bladder surgery on the same night Arthur's undefeated basketball team has a game, so the two will have to spend their first night apart since they were married. It turns out that Arthur is helpless around the house without Marjorie there. He manages to slip and twist his ankle while making a sandwich and ends up in the same hospital as Marjorie, meaning Ronny has to coach the team by himself.
8	"Red Sox Swap"	Pamela Fryman	Jim Brandon & Brian Singleton	December 18, 2014	110	6.94
The family is joined by friends Phillip (Jeff Hiller) and Maurice (Gilles Marini), upstairs renter Pam (Alyson Hannigan), and Katrina for a white elephant gift exchange. While Marjorie and Katrina battle to claim a ceramic owl, Jackie gets upset that none of her brothers trade for her gift, which is a certificate to be the godfather of her child.
9	"Sister Act"	Phill Lewis	Becky Mann & Audra Sielaff	January 8, 2015	111	7.98
The McCarthys are annoyed that a trivia contest has taken over their favorite pub, but after informally answering all the questions correctly, they decide to form a team. Marjorie's sister Eileen (Jane Kaczmarek), who is always competing with her, arrives in town with her family. After the two lie about the accomplishments of their family members over a stressful dinner, Eileen finally reveals why she is always trying to one-up her sister.
10	"Hall of Fame"	Pamela Fryman	Josh Greenberg	January 15, 2015	105	6.96
On Hall of Fame night at the high school, Sean is being inducted and the late assistant coach "Faddy" McFadden is being honored. In a misguided attempt to spare Gerard's feelings, Marjorie tells him that he is being inducted along with Sean, and the family is afraid to tell him he's not. Meanwhile, Jackie is afraid to tell Faddy's mother that she's carrying her deceased son's child, given that the two only had a one-night stand. Ronny encourages Jackie to embellish the details of her and Faddy's relationship.
11	"The Ref"	Pamela Fryman	Tom Hertz	January 29, 2015	107	7.11
Arthur sends Ronny out on the floor during a game to argue with the referee, instructing him to get a technical foul which might fire up the team. Instead, Ronny discovers the ref is gay and secretly makes a date with him, which he then has to hide from his parents. Meanwhile, Katrina is convinced that Gerard is cheating on her because he keeps running off to Lowell at night. Marjorie is thrilled, thinking the wedding will be called off, but it turns out Gerard was only moonlighting...as a referee.
12	"Gerard's Engagement Party"	Ken Whittingham	Mike Sikowitz	July 4, 2015	108	1.86
Katrina hosts an engagement party for her and Gerard on a boat, but Ronny and Gerard are running late and end up on the wrong boat, forcing Marjorie and Katrina to bond. Katrina's mother (Jean Smart), whose husband ran off eight years ago, shows a romantic interest in Sean. Meanwhile, Jackie wonders why her dad doesn't seem excited about the pending arrival of his grandchild.
13	"Cutting the Cord"	Pamela Fryman	Kate Purdy	July 4, 2015	112	1.82
When a neighbor mistakes Marjorie for Ronny's girlfriend, the siblings tease Ronny about his odd closeness to Mom. After Ronny retorts that his siblings are always at their parents' house, the kids all make a bet over who can go the longest without seeing a parent. Marjorie, of course, is not happy about the contest.
14	"Family Therapy"	Pamela Fryman	Josh Greenberg	July 11, 2015	113	1.84
Ronnie admits to Marjorie that he's seeing a therapist (David Alan Grier). The entire family then shows up at Ronny's next session to find out what he is saying about them. While initially angry, Ronny soon decides that every family member could use a little therapy.
15	"End Games"	Pamela Fryman	Jim Brandon & Brian Singleton	July 11, 2015	114	1.72
A close call while driving on a snowy road leads Marjorie and Arthur to get their final affairs in order. The children all compete to be executor of the family estate. As part of her efforts, Marjorie gives Katrina a necklace she believes to be cheap junk, but tells Katrina it's a family heirloom. Katrina then taunts Marjorie by saying she had the necklace appraised for $11,000, which may or may not be true.

== Production ==
Jacki Weaver was set to play Marjorie, but later dropped out due to her work on Gracepoint and Patrick Stewart's Starz comedy Blunt Talk. On December 1, 2014, CBS increased the series' first season order from 13 to 15 episodes.

== Reception ==
The pilot of The McCarthys has received mixed reviews from critics. On Rotten Tomatoes, the show holds a rating of 57%, based on 40 reviews, with an average rating of 5.3/10. The site's consensus reads, "The McCarthys is a semi-successful attempt at a throwback sitcom with above-par performances, but its broad stereotypes and lack of a unique point of view also make it semi-forgettable." On Metacritic, the show has a score of 53 out of 100, based on 22 critics, indicating "mixed or average reviews".

== Syndication ==
Despite its cancellation, the series still has syndicated reruns on various networks, such as Universal HD. This has been supported by high syndication ratings.
