= Luke Tennie =

American actor

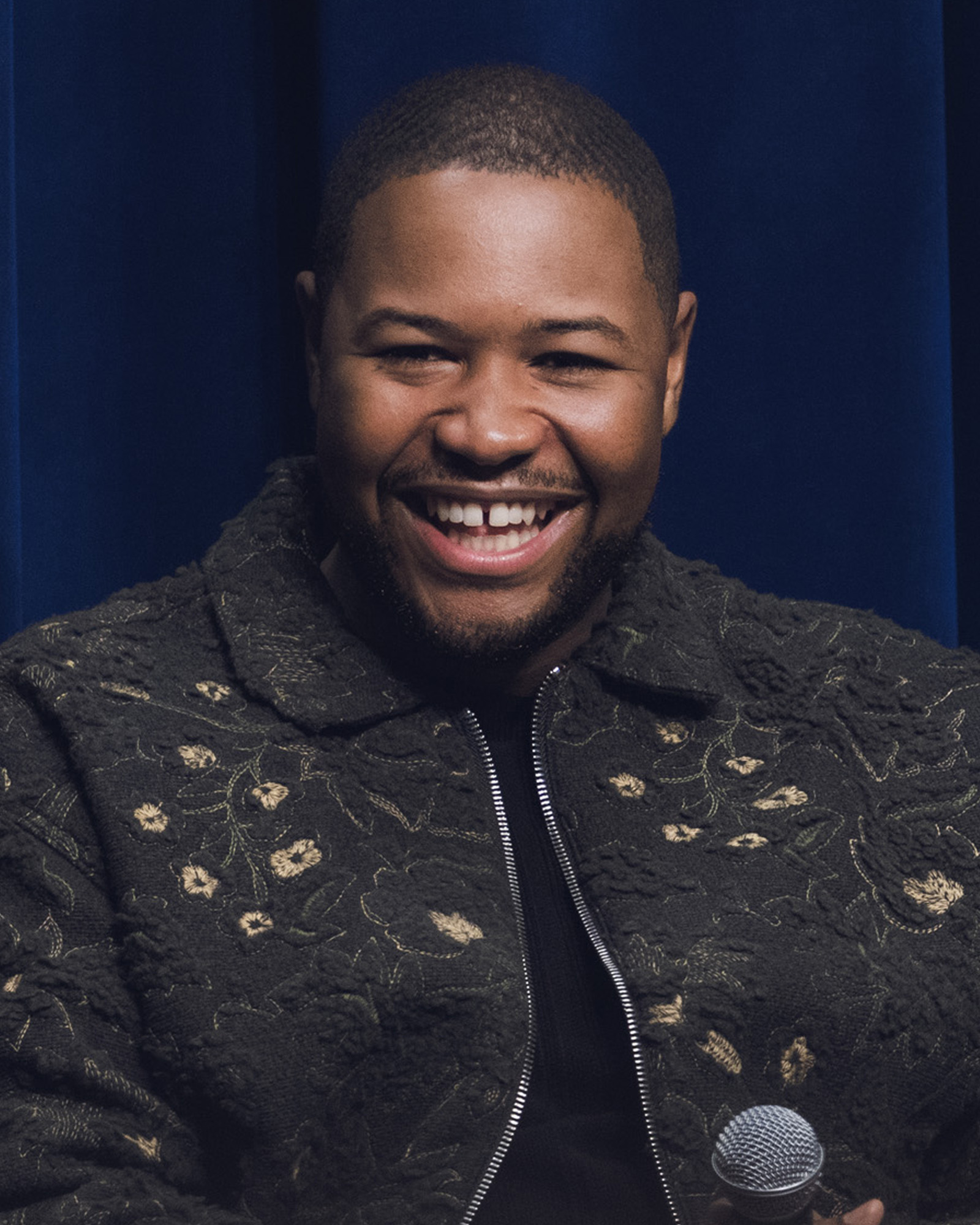
- Tennie in 2024
- Born: November 21, 1994 (age 31); Chicago, Illinois, U.S.
- Occupation: Actor
- Years active: 2017–present
- Spouse: María Romero (m. 2021)
- Children: 2

Luke Tennie (born November 21, 1994) is an American actor. He is best known for his role as Sean Mitchell on the Apple TV comedy series Shrinking.

== Early life and education ==
Tennie was born in Chicago, and raised in Plantation, Florida, where he attended American Heritage School and played football. He attended the American Musical and Dramatic Academy, from which he graduated in 2016.

== Career ==
Tennie made his debut in the 2017 Rob Reiner film Shock and Awe. In 2018, he had a main role in the Syfy action series Deadly Class. In 2020, he starred in the Disney+ sports drama film Safety.

Beginning in 2023, Tennie began starring as Sean in the comedy-drama series Shrinking. Alongside the cast, Tennie received a nomination for the Screen Actors Guild Award for Outstanding Performance by an Ensemble in a Comedy Series at the 31st Screen Actors Guild Awards, and also earned a nomination for the Independent Spirit Award for Best Supporting Performance in a New Scripted Series.

In 2024, Tennie had a role in the film Nickel Boys, which was nominated for the Academy Award for Best Picture. In 2025, Tennie joined the cast of Abbott Elementary in a recurring role, and in 2026 joined the cast of The Pitt in its second season. In the same year, it was announced he would star in the videogame Call of Duty: Modern Warfare 4 as the character Lieutenant West.

== Personal life ==
Tennie married María Romero in 2021. They both appeared together with their friend on the Netflix Competition Show, Floor Is Lava (Season 3, Episode 5 "Child’s Play"). Tennie sacrificed himself to the lava in hopes of helping his wife reach the exit. She also succumbed to the lava, and their team was eliminated. The couple has two children.

== Filmography ==
=== Film ===
Year	Title	Role	Notes
2017	Shock and Awe	Adam Green	
2018	Thriller	Derrick Jackson	
2020	Safety	Solomon	
2024	Nickel Boys	Griff	

=== Television ===
Year	Title	Role	Notes
2018	Snowfall	Vic	1 episode
2018–2019	Deadly Class	Willie Lewis	Main role, 10 episodes
2022	Floor is Lava	Himself	1 episode
2021	On the Verge	Fred	Recurring role, 6 episodes
2021–2023	CSI: Vegas	Bryan Roby	Recurring role, 8 episodes
2022	Players	Rudy Elmore Jr.	Recurring role, 9 episodes
2023–present	Shrinking	Sean Mitchell	Main role, 33 episodes
2025–present	Abbott Elementary	Dominic Clark	Recurring role, 7 episodes
2026	The Pitt	Dr. Crus Henderson	3 episodes

=== Videogames ===
Year	Title	Role	Notes
2026	Call of Duty: Modern Warfare 4	Lieutenant West	
