= Shrinking =

American comedy series

- Genre: Comedy drama
- Created by: Bill Lawrence; Jason Segel; Brett Goldstein
- Starring: Jason Segel; Jessica Williams; Luke Tennie; Michael Urie; Lukita Maxwell; Christa Miller; Harrison Ford; Ted McGinley
- Theme music composer: Benjamin Gibbard; Tom Howe
- Composer: Tom Howe
- Country of origin: United States
- Original language: English
- No. of seasons: 3
- No. of episodes: 33

Production
- Executive producers: Bill Lawrence; Jason Segel; Brett Goldstein; Neil Goldman; Jeff Ingold; Liza Katzer; James Ponsoldt; Randall Keenan Winston; Annie Mebane; Rachna Fruchbom; Brian Gallivan; Bill Posley; Ashley Nicole Black
- Producer: Kip Kroeger
- Cinematography: Jim Frohna; John Brawley
- Editors: James Renfroe; Katie Abel; Missy Hernandez; Peggy Tachdjian; Sarah Lucky
- Running time: 29–63 minutes
- Production companies: 3 Chance Productions; Corporate Mandate; Doozer Productions; Warner Bros. Television

Original release
- Network: Apple TV+
- Release: January 27, 2023 – December 24, 2024
- Network: Apple TV
- Release: January 28, 2026 – present

Shrinking is an American comedy-drama television series created by Bill Lawrence, Jason Segel, and Brett Goldstein. The series stars Segel as a grieving therapist who decides to become drastically more involved in his patients' lives. Harrison Ford, Jessica Williams, Christa Miller, Michael Urie, Luke Tennie, Lukita Maxwell, and Ted McGinley also star.

The series premiered on January 27, 2023, on Apple TV+. It has received positive reviews, with praise for its performances, writing, humor, and examination of grief. It was renewed for a second season in March 2023. The second season premiered on October 16, 2024. In the same month, the series was renewed for an 11-episode third season, which premiered on Apple TV on January 28, 2026. Shrinking was renewed for a fourth season in January 2026.

The first season received two nominations at the 75th Primetime Emmy Awards: Outstanding Lead Actor in a Comedy Series for Segel and Outstanding Supporting Actress in a Comedy Series for Williams. Ford received nominations at the Critics' Choice Awards and the TCA Awards for his performance, along with nominations for the series itself. For its second season, the series was recognized as one of the top ten television programs of the year by the American Film Institute.

== Premise ==
A therapist, Jimmy Laird, dealing with severe grief after his wife's death, begins to breach ethical barriers by telling his patients what he really thinks, resulting in massive changes to his and their lives.

== Cast and characters ==
=== Main ===
- Jason Segel as Jimmy Laird, a therapist who works at the Cognitive Behavioral Therapy Center and is grieving the death of his wife
- Jessica Williams as Gaby Evans, a fellow therapist working with Jimmy at the Cognitive Behavioral Therapy Center
- Luke Tennie as Sean Mitchell, a patient suffering from anger management issues who has sessions with Jimmy
- Michael Urie as Brian Lorenzo, Jimmy's best friend who is a lawyer
- Lukita Maxwell as Alice Laird, Jimmy's teenaged daughter with whom he has a strained relationship
- Christa Miller as Liz Bishop, Jimmy's next-door neighbor who also helps with looking after Alice
- Harrison Ford as Dr. Paul Rhoades, a senior therapist and colleague of Jimmy's at the Cognitive Behavioral Therapy Center who has Parkinson's disease
- Ted McGinley as Derek Bishop (season 2–present; recurring season 1), Liz's husband

=== Recurring ===
- Heidi Gardner as Grace (seasons 1–2), one of Jimmy's patients
- Lilan Bowden as Tia (seasons 1–2, guest season 3), Jimmy's wife and Alice's mother who was killed in a drunk driving accident
- Devin Kawaoka as Charlie, Brian's fiancé and eventually husband
- Rachel Stubington as Summer, Alice's best friend at school
- Kenajuan Bentley as Tim, Sean's estranged father
- Lily Rabe as Meg, Paul's daughter
- Wendie Malick as Dr. Julie Baram, a neurologist treating Paul's Parkinson's disease with whom he begins a romance and eventually marries
- Kimberly Condict as Wally, one of Jimmy's patients who has obsessive–compulsive disorder
- Tilky Jones as Donny (seasons 1–2), Grace's abusive husband
- Mike C. Nelson as Dan, one of Jimmy's patients
- Jill Knox as Donna, Mark's wife and one of Gaby's patients
- Keith Powell as Mark, Donna's husband and one of Gaby's patients
- Gavin Lewis as Connor Bishop (season 2; guest seasons 1, 3), a son of neighbors Liz and Derek and friend of Alice
- Neil Flynn as Raymond (season 2–present; guest season 1), one of Paul's patients
- Trey Santiago-Hudson as Jorge (season 2-present), a veteran who served with Sean and now runs a food truck with him
- Brett Goldstein as Louis Winston (season 2–present), the drunk driver responsible for Tia's fatal car accident, who ultimately befriends Alice and later Jimmy
- Courtney Taylor as Courtney (season 2), Gaby's sister
- Amy Rosoff as Dr. Sykes (season 2, guest season 3), Paul's new doctor
- Vernee Watson as Phyllis (season 2–present), Gaby's mother
- Josh Hopkins as Mac (season 2, guest season 3), Liz's ex-boyfriend who reenters her life
- Damon Wayans Jr. as Derrick #2 (season 2–present), Derek's friend who hits it off with Gaby
- Markus Silbiger as Matthew Bishop (season 3, guest season 2), a son of Liz and Derek's
- Claudia Sulewski as Ava (season 3, guest season 2), a pregnant mother who interviews Brian and Charlie for adopting her child
- Cobie Smulders as Sofi (season 3, guest season 2), Jimmy's love interest

=== Guest ===
- Asif Ali as Alan (season 1), one of Jimmy's patients
- Miriam Flynn as Pam (season 1; season 3), Jimmy and Liz's heavily disliked neighbor
- Brian Howe as Kip (season 1; season 3), Brian's father
- Kelly Bishop as Susan (season 2), Paul's ex-wife and Meg's mother
- Meredith Hagner as Sarah (season 2–present), Louis' former fiancée
- Tanner Zagarino as Dylan (season 2), Alice's classmate with whom she goes on a casual date
- Nora Kirkpatrick as Kellie (season 2–present), a nanny hired by Brian and Charlie
- Matt Mitchell as Will Bishop (season 2-present), Liz and Derek's mature and responsible son
- Michael J. Fox as Gerry (season 3-present), a Parkinson's patient Paul meets at the doctor's office
- Isabella Gomez as Marisol (season 3), Sean's ex-girlfriend who comes back into his life
- Sherry Cola as Maya (season 3), Gaby's newest patient
- Samuel Page as Casey (season 3), Sarah's new boyfriend
- Jeff Daniels as Randy Laird (season 3), Jimmy's father
- Lisa Gilroy as Kimmy (season 3), a nurse Liz sets Jimmy up with
- Candice Bergen as Constance (season 3), Derek's mother
- Matt Jones as Nick (season 3), Sofi's ex-husband
- Meg DeLacy as Peyton (season 3), Will Bishop's pregnant girlfriend
- Karen Gillan (season 4)
- Judith Light (season 4)
- Scott Foley (season 4)

== Episodes ==
=== Series overview ===
Season	Episodes	Originally released		
Season	Episodes	First released	Last released	Network
1	10	January 27, 2023	March 24, 2023	Apple TV+
2	12	October 16, 2024	December 24, 2024	Apple TV+
3	11	January 28, 2026	April 8, 2026	Apple TV

=== Season 1 (2023) ===
No. overall	No. in season	Title	Directed by	Written by	Original release date	Prod. code
1	1	"Coin Flip"	James Ponsoldt	Bill Lawrence & Jason Segel & Brett Goldstein	January 27, 2023	T12.17451
Jimmy Laird, a therapist grieving his wife Tia's death from a car crash, has grown weary of his patients' inability to solve their own problems. He begins intervening in their lives to help them expedite the changes they desire. He convinces one patient, Grace, to leave her abusive husband, and enrolls Sean, a veteran prone to violent outbursts, in mixed martial arts training. Jimmy's approach initially seems successful, but he keeps it secret from his fellow therapists Gaby and Paul, aware there are ethical violations. Jimmy, whose relationship with his daughter Alice has strained since her mother's death, goes with Sean to her soccer game. Grace's husband, Donny, finds him there and assaults him, and Sean beats Donny in retaliation. Alice thanks Jimmy for coming to her game; Jimmy admits his struggle to be more present in her life owes to how much she reminds him of Tia.
2	2	"Fortress of Solitude"	Ry Russo-Young	Brett Goldstein	January 27, 2023	T12.17452
Jimmy bails out Sean from the police station, and gets his best friend Brian, an estate lawyer, to successfully defend Sean from a lawsuit launched by Donny. Brian invites Jimmy to play pickleball; Jimmy declines, leading Brian to barge into one of his sessions and berate him for his yearlong absence as a friend. Paul, meanwhile, encourages Alice to reciprocate Jimmy's desire to be a better parent, but she inadvertently reveals the fight at her game to him. A furious Paul confronts Jimmy over his lapse in ethics. Gaby, meanwhile, asks Jimmy's neighbor Liz – who has largely been raising Alice since Tia's death – to step back in her caretaking, offending her. Jimmy, unaware that Alice has brought dinner home to have with him, visits Brian for pickleball, and the two reconcile. Alice opts to have food with Paul at his house.
3	3	"Fifteen Minutes"	Ry Russo-Young	Brian Gallivan	February 3, 2023	T12.17453
Jimmy allows Sean to stay with him and Alice, since Sean's parents kicked him out of his house after his fight with Donny. Gaby reveals to Jimmy that she is divorcing her husband Nico, and admits to missing her close friendship with Tia. Alice and Sean become closer; Liz, feeling suspicious, tells Paul, who thereby learns about Sean living in Jimmy's house. He chastises Jimmy for moving a patient into his home and cuts off contact with him, even though Jimmy is grateful to Paul for helping Alice through her grief. While on a walk, Jimmy spots Grace with Donny, realizing she got back together with him.
4	4	"Potatoes"	James Ponsoldt	Rachna Fruchbom	February 10, 2023	T12.17454
Jimmy struggles to get Sean to open up about his postwar PTSD. Brian is revealed to have been overseeing Paul's estate; Paul confides that he has not told his daughter Meg about his Parkinson's disease. Meg visits Paul, where Paul once again neglects to mention his illness. Alice and Gaby tell Jimmy that Alice lost her virginity to Liz's son Connor. Jimmy, overwhelmed, lashes out at Liz for overly involving herself in his daughter's life; he also angers Sean when he tries forcing him to tell him about his PTSD. Jimmy later reconciles with Connor, who has come to visit, and enjoys drinks with Gaby and Liz before also reconciling with Sean. That night, he overhears Alice admit her feelings for Sean.
5	5	"Woof"	James Ponsoldt	Bill Posley	February 17, 2023	T12.17455
Jimmy and Paul continue not to speak to one another. Jimmy encourages Sean to get over his resentment for his father, but Sean is shaken when his father gives him a war medallion and praises him as a hero. He and Alice go for a walk; Alice becomes concerned for Sean when he recklessly climbs a water tower. Brian tells Jimmy and Gaby he wants to propose to his boyfriend Charlie; they dismiss it, as Brian has brought up the idea several times without committing to it, and Brian later confides to Gaby his fear of taking risks ever since coming out to his parents. Gaby urges Paul to make up with Jimmy; Paul visits Jimmy's house while Jimmy is trying to persuade Sean not to leave, and helps Sean open up about his trauma. Paul later calls Meg to tell her about his Parkinson's diagnosis.
6	6	"Imposter Syndrome"	Randall Keenan Winston	Annie Mebane	February 24, 2023	T12.17456
Brian buys a wedding ring for Charlie, and makes plans to propose at a party at Jimmy's house. Jimmy is apprehensive about throwing the party, since it reminds him of the strain in his and Tia's marriage in the months leading up to her death. Paul is anxious about Meg's plans to come oversee his care, feeling guilty over her investment in his wellbeing given his absence as a father during her childhood. Liz helps him see the situation with gratitude instead. Jimmy gets heavily drunk at the party and throws up, but Brian's proposal is still a success. Alice tries to kiss Sean, but he becomes uncomfortable due to their age gap and leaves. Gaby assures Jimmy that Tia still loved him despite the difficulties in their marriage; Jimmy thanks her for her friendship, and the two impulsively have sex.
7	7	"Apology Tour"	Randall Keenan Winston	Brett Goldstein	March 3, 2023	T12.17457
The morning after the party, Jimmy is consumed with guilt over sleeping with Gaby, but she helps him resolve his discomfort, assuring him their friendship is perfectly intact. Alice regrets attempting to kiss Sean, and is also comforted by Gaby. Liz's husband Derek tells her he has earned the right to enjoy living at home once he retires, and encourages her to go out and adopt new hobbies of her own. Meg comes to care for Paul, and Paul attempts to make up for years of lost time with her. However, he is unable to accept her invitation to move to the East Coast to stay with her and her family, causing her to leave angrily. At Gaby's suggestion, Jimmy has an imaginary conversation with Tia where he apologizes for becoming intimate with Gaby; however, Alice overhears him.
8	8	"Boop"	Zach Braff	Wally Baram	March 10, 2023	T12.17458
Jimmy and Gaby make a fumbling apology to Alice for sleeping together. Alice attempts to vent her frustrations to Paul, but he rebuffs her self-centered attitude, still reeling from his argument with his daughter. Alice disappears that night; Paul thinks she is at a party with her friends, and Jimmy and Brian bring him along to search for her. On the way, Brian tells Jimmy that he and Charlie do not want him officiating their wedding, angering Jimmy. The trio eventually find Alice with an older college student and bring her home. Paul convinces Jimmy to assert himself to others despite his own personal regrets, and so Jimmy grounds Alice for her misbehavior. Meanwhile, Gaby brings Liz and Sean to her ex-husband Nico's art exhibition, but lashes out at him publicly when she sees him pass off his new girlfriend as his "muse".
9	9	"Moving Forward"	Randall Keenan Winston	Sofi Selig	March 17, 2023	T12.17459
Paul learns he is being honored with a Lifetime Achievement Award from the APA in Las Vegas, but is uninterested in going in light of his strained relationship with Meg. Gaby discovers Paul is in a relationship with his doctor, Julie. Jimmy encourages Paul to take Julie to accept his award; Paul instead takes her to surprise Meg by attending her son's school play. Gaby reconciles with Nico and nearly sleeps with him, but instead has sex with Jimmy again. Brian agrees to let Jimmy officiate his wedding, while Liz agrees to finance Sean's catering business. On Tia's birthday, Jimmy visits her gravesite. Alice later realizes she forgot her mother's birthday and blames herself.
10	10	"Closure"	James Ponsoldt	Neil Goldman	March 24, 2023	T12.17460
Alice gets upset with Jimmy for packing up Tia's belongings out of a desire to move on. Liz asks to become more involved with Sean's catering business, which he happily accepts. Jimmy asks Brian's father to be best man at his wedding to Charlie. Paul thanks Jimmy for his help in reconciling with Meg, but Liz chastises him for not putting in the work to write a recommendation for Gaby's professorship. Paul then personally visits Gaby's interview for the position to advocate for her. Jimmy uncovers Tia's belongings for Alice to reminisce. He delivers a passionate speech at Brian and Charlie's wedding, making Gaby realize she may have feelings for Jimmy. Meanwhile, Grace, recalling Jimmy's advice about not putting up with Donny's abuse, snaps when Donny insults her while on a hike and pushes him off a cliff.

=== Season 2 (2024) ===
No. overall	No. in season	Title	Directed by	Written by	Original release date	Prod. code
11	1	"Jimmying"	Randall Keenan Winston	Rachna Fruchbom	October 16, 2024	T12.18201
Grace is arrested for nearly killing Donny; Jimmy tries hiding his regret, making Alice worry he will fall into the same self-destructive patterns he exhibited after Tia's death. Paul tells Jimmy to revert to conventional therapy for the time being. Gaby has continued having sex with Jimmy for months in hopes of a serious romance, despite Liz's attempts to dissuade her. Paul and Julie confess their love for one another. Sean is hesitant to visit Jorge, an old army friend, due to fear of triggering his PTSD; Jimmy spars with him at the gym in exchange for him going, leading Paul to admonish Jimmy to stop seeing Sean as a patient due to their dual relationship. When Jimmy realizes Sean is lying to him about having seen Jorge, he convinces Sean to switch to Paul as his therapist. Jimmy is shocked when Louis, the drunk driver who killed Tia, visits his office to apologize, and angrily kicks him out.
12	2	"I Love Pain"	Randall Keenan Winston	Annie Mebane	October 16, 2024	T12.18202
After some hesitation, Jimmy tells Alice he got a visit from Louis; Alice pens an imaginary letter to Louis as a therapeutic exercise. Paul is forced to let go of his longtime patient Raymond to make room for Sean, but later joins Raymond for a drink after Jimmy tells Paul his therapeutic boundaries are too rigid. Liz is ecstatic to learn that a blogger wants to cover the food truck she and Sean are running, but Sean sours on the idea after learning that the article will focus on his veteran past. To help Sean through his anxiety about how to express his feelings to Liz, Paul gives him a mental tool, the "reversal of desire", to help him confront and embrace pain. Sean's conversation with Liz ultimately goes well. Gaby tells Jimmy she wants to end their sexual relationship; Jimmy later visits her, and she berates him for selfishly continuing to have sex with her despite knowing she caught feelings for him. Alice is seen spying on Louis.
13	3	"Psychological Something-ism"	Zach Braff	Brian Gallivan	October 23, 2024	T12.18203
Grace's charges are dropped due to Donny's abusive past, but she goes back to him, feeling like she deserves punishment. Brian collects character witness statements from Grace's friends and reads them to her in front of Jimmy and her sister, convincing Grace to finally leave Donny and move in with her sister in Vancouver. Sean's estranged father Tim visits the food truck, having once wanted to start a similar business with his son; Liz, feeling selfish, sells her shares of the business to Tim, enraging Sean. Paul's anxiety over his Parkinson's strains his relationship with Julie. After Jimmy and Brian fight over not really knowing each other's lives, Jimmy visits Brian and his husband for dinner to invest more in their friendship. Against Paul's advice, Alice tracks down Louis and has an angry outburst at him, accidentally leaving her wallet. Seeking comfort, she kisses Liz and Derek's son, Connor, despite having set him up with her best friend Summer.
14	4	"Made You Look"	Zach Braff	Sofi Selig	October 30, 2024	T12.18204
Alice and Connor are revealed to have slept together; Alice immediately regrets it the morning after and makes Connor promise not to tell Summer. Sean's anger issues resurface over having to share his food business with his father. He eventually confides in Jimmy that he resents his father for ignoring his postwar PTSD and kicking him out of the house instead of offering help, only to take credit for his eventual success. Paul urges Jimmy not to keep playing therapist with Sean, but later admits to feeling jealous of Sean's trust in Jimmy, as well as afraid of the effects of his Parkinson's on his job. Liz encourages Brian to consider fatherhood after Charlie expresses interest in adopting a child. Gaby hits it off with Derek's friend Derrick (AKA "Derrick #2"); Derek sets them up on a date, but Gaby is forced to leave upon hearing that her mother got in a car accident. Brian finds Louis outside the Laird home trying to return Alice's lost wallet; rather than rebuff him, Brian assures Louis that the Lairds are doing better, and asks him how he is doing.
15	5	"Honesty Era"	Jamie Babbit	Zack Bornstein	November 6, 2024	T12.18205
Summer is furious with Alice after Connor admits to sleeping with her. To cheer her up, Jimmy takes Alice to get matching tattoos of Tia's initials. Paul is anxious upon getting a visit from his ex-wife Susan, whom he cheated on; Susan later tells him she heard about his Parkinson's and simply wants to spend time with him while she can, and the two reconcile. At her sister Courtney's urging, Gaby talks her mother into finally getting a cataract surgery following her car crash. Gaby, who was forced to take care of Courtney during her addiction struggles, has since made Courtney take care of their mother as penance; Jimmy helps Gaby let go of her resentment, and she lets him join her family for dinner. Jimmy lets slip that Liz ran into her ex, Mac, who Derek is insecure about; Liz's resulting tension with Derek causes her to lash out at Jimmy. Paul advises that Sean open up to his father Tim from a place of goodwill, but Tim responds harshly to the idea that he let his son down. Sean later provokes a group of hostile construction workers into beating him up.
16	6	"In a Lonely Place"	Randall Keenan Winston	Brett Goldstein	November 13, 2024	T12.18206
Sean is hospitalized following his beating; Tim is nowhere to be found. Jimmy and Paul find Tim fishing in a river, feeling guilty. The two confide their own failures as fathers, and Tim admits he didn't know how to help Sean upon his return from war. Tim finally visits Sean in the hospital and the two reconcile. Gaby releases Courtney from her obligation to solely look after their mother. Brian convinces Alice to come meet Louis; Louis confides his guilt and depression following Tia's death, and Alice, at Louis' request, shares a story about Tia. Alice decides to forgive Louis, feeling it is what Tia would have done. Connor returns to college; Liz, feeling unfulfilled and directionless as an empty-nester, secretly spends more time with Mac.
17	7	"Get in the Sea"	Randall Keenan Winston	Kyra Brown & CJ Hoke	November 20, 2024	T12.18207
Gaby and Derrick #2 go on their first date, only to be interrupted by a last-minute request by Gaby's student to go over her thesis. Their next date is cut short by Brian, who feels hugely unprepared to raise a child so soon, but afraid to admit this to Charlie; Derrick #2 suggests they all swim in the beach to release tension. Jimmy has his patient Dan join him throughout the day to help overcome his social anxiety, and the two join Derrick #2, Gaby, Brian and Charlie in the water, where Charlie also admits his fear of fatherhood; he and Brian decide to wait a few months before they are ready to adopt a child. Jimmy and Dan also convince Sean to reconnect with Jorge. Alice reconciles with Summer. Paul catches Liz talking to Mac. Liz and Mac later kiss; Liz confides this to Paul, who recommends that she come clean to Derek. Derek, however, is devastated upon hearing the news. Jimmy spots Alice and Brian having dinner with Louis.
18	8	"Last Drink"	James Ponsoldt	Sasha Garron	November 27, 2024	T12.18208
Flashbacks show Jimmy and Louis spending time with their respective loved ones leading up to the car crash. In the aftermath, Louis breaks up with his fiancée Sarah, feeling she will only remind him of his guilt, while Jimmy numbs himself with drugs and prostitutes, leading Alice to seek solace with Liz's family. In the present, Brian and Alice catch up with Jimmy and explain why they reached out to Louis; Alice suggests to Jimmy that he too forgive Louis. Derek goes to stay at Gaby's house, leaving Liz despondent over his absence. Derek goes to confront Mac, only to realize it is futile, and Gaby helps him see that he was inattentive to Liz's depression as an empty-nester. Derek forgives Liz and surprises her by inviting their three sons over for dinner. Jimmy visits Louis and tells him he forgives him, but then orders him to stay away from him and his friends and family. Paul decides to quit drinking at his doctor's urging, and shares his final drink with Jimmy. Jimmy tells Paul he still has not forgiven himself for failing as a father to Alice; Paul tells him he hopes he can.
19	9	"Full Grown Dude Face"	Anu Valia	Bill Posley	December 4, 2024	T12.18209
Gaby learns that Courtney is joining the army; she is supportive, but worried that she will now be responsible for taking care of her mother, who expects to move in with her. Paul advises Gaby to exercise boundaries, but Gaby still ends up allowing her mother to stay at her house. Brian and Charlie have an adoption meeting with Ava, pregnant mother who is deciding between them and another couple; Brian successfully overcomes his anxiety during the meeting, allowing him and Charlie to connect well with Ava. Nevertheless, she chooses the other couple. Alice goes on a date to a party, but is put off by everyone there feeling sorry for her over Tia's death. Jimmy tells her to use humor to reclaim ownership of her grief and put others at ease around her; Alice takes his advice and returns to the party, where she ends up enjoying herself. Jimmy is grateful that he was finally there for his daughter when she needed him.
20	10	"Changing Patterns"	James Ponsoldt	Ashley Nicole Black	December 11, 2024	T12.18210
Alice tells Paul that she is ready to take a break from therapy, which he is proud to hear. After Julie's husband dies, she sells their house and stays with Paul; Gaby convinces Paul to have Julie move in with him. Paul in turn urges Gaby to be honest with her mother about not wanting her to move in with her; Gaby eventually tells her mother, who is heartbroken. Liz has been noticeably more fawning and deferential to Derek out of lingering shame over her infidelity, which even he is put off by; Brian and Gaby encourage her to go back to being herself. On Alice's 18th birthday, Jimmy surprises her with a Mini Cooper similar to the one Tia owned; he buys the car from an attractive divorced mother named Sofi, with whom he immediately connects. Louis texts Alice suggesting they no longer speak, prompting Alice to visit him; Louis admits Jimmy forbade him from speaking with her, and an enraged Alice tells Jimmy he ruined yet another birthday for her.
21	11	"The Drugs Don't Work"	Randall Keenan Winston	Neil Goldman	December 18, 2024	T12.18211
Jimmy and Alice argue about Louis and she decides to stay with Gaby on Summer's suggestion. Gaby tries to get back in her mother's good graces by inviting her along to Thanksgiving; she neglects to invite Derrick #2, fearing emotional intimacy, and he decides to break up with her. Paul's Parkinson's symptoms worsen over the stress of having Julie move in with him. He goes to see his doctor and discovers she is sleeping with Sean; she tells Paul that he has approximately 6 months to a year before his meds stop working altogether. Brian and Derek try to provide Sean an opportunity to move out of the pool house, which he declines. Brian and Charlie get a call from Ava, who has changed her mind and decided to give her baby to them. Jimmy helps a patient, Wally, return her neighbor's dog after she kidnaps it. Paul observes that Jimmy is using his patients to chase emotional highs instead of facing his own traumas, and admonishes Jimmy to ask for help when he needs it. Jimmy suffers a breakdown soon after and calls Paul, finally admitting he is not doing well.
22	12	"The Last Thanksgiving"	Bill Lawrence	Bill Lawrence & Neil Goldman & Brett Goldstein	December 24, 2024	T12.18212
Jimmy has a brief therapy session with Paul, where he vows never to blame Alice for his own suffering. Brian and Charlie interview potential nannies with Liz; Derek convinces them to allow Liz to help them two days of the week, finally giving her a sense of purpose in life. Gaby reaches out to Derrick #2, but he insists that she work on herself before continuing their relationship. Sean advises Alice that love given with the expectation of personal change is not unconditional, helping Alice let go of some of her anger at Jimmy. Jimmy helps out Summer from a bind at the pharmacy, which reminds Alice of his many good deeds, and they reconcile. The gang meets at Gaby's for their Thanksgiving dinner, where Derrick #2 shows up by surprise with his aunt and Gaby's mother. Paul tearfully expresses his gratitude to everyone for being in his life during his health struggles. Louis gets disinvited from his coworker's gathering; he goes to the train station feeling suicidal and he reaches out to Alice, but Gaby has placed all her guests' phones in exile for the evening. Jimmy, however, discovers the message and meets with Louis at the train station.

=== Season 3 (2026) ===
No. overall	No. in season	Title	Directed by	Written by	Original release date	Prod. code
23	1	"My Bad"	Randall Keenan Winston	Brian Gallivan	January 28, 2026	T12.20301
23	1	"My Bad"	Randall Keenan Winston	Brian Gallivan	January 28, 2026	T12.20302
Paul's Parkinson's symptoms have worsened; he befriends a patient, Gerry, while waiting in the neurology clinic. Paul's neurologist Dr. Sykes amicably ends her sexual relationship with Sean. Jimmy has been regularly meeting Louis on a park bench to discuss their lives. Liz and Derek's older son, Matthew, moves back home. Brian and Charlie, preparing for their baby to arrive, have still not discussed what role Ava will play in their lives; Brian initially admits to wanting a closed adoption, but changes his mind after meeting with Ava and agrees to let her visit regularly. Alice is visited by the Wesleyan University women's soccer coach at her latest game. The coach offers her a scholarship, but Alice turns it down, anxious about moving away from her loved ones; she later accepts the offer at Jimmy's encouragement. As Paul and Julie get the former's affairs in order, Jimmy impulsively suggests they get married, which they realize will solve their problems; Gaby arranges a wedding ceremony for them in Jimmy's backyard, with Jimmy giving a heartfelt speech. Paul sees Gerry in his kitchen afterwards and talks with him, but Julie does not see him; Paul realizes it was a hallucination.
24	2	"Happiness Mission"	Zach Braff	Brett Goldstein	February 4, 2026	T12.20303
Paul takes some time off to recover from his hallucinations; Jimmy and Gaby cover for his patients at work, and Liz coordinates his schedule. Derek and Liz struggle with the decision to force their son, Matthew, to leave their house. Paul advises Derek that he needs to help Matthew grow; he reluctantly does. Jimmy and Alice spend time with Louis; Gaby becomes upset as she has not forgiven Louis. She angrily confronts Louis, who leaves to see his ex-fiancee, Sarah. Seeing that she is happily in a relationship with another man, he decides to move to San Diego for a fresh start. Sofi goes to Jimmy's house to give him a spare key to the car she sold them; they have coffee together and Jimmy wants to ask her out on a date.
25	3	"D-Day"	Zach Braff	Bill Posley	February 11, 2026	T12.20304
26	4	"The Field"	Rebecca Asher	Ashley Nicole Black	February 18, 2026	T12.20305
27	5	"Hold Your Horsies"	Randall Keenan Winston	Sofi Selig	February 25, 2026	T12.20306
28	6	"Dereks Don't Die"	Randall Keenan Winston	CJ Hoke	March 4, 2026	T12.20307
Jimmy struggles to cope with his affair with Meg, remaining fearful of Paul's reaction. Liz pleads for Jimmy to assist her in repairing her relationship with Matthew, but he remains unsure. Gaby introduces Maya to Sean's boxing gym. During a medical checkup, Derek is raced to the hospital with concerns over his heart, terrifying Liz. Motivated, Jimmy forces Matthew to reconcile with Liz. Derek awakens from his surgery, while Paul persuades Meg to consider counselling with her husband.
29	7	"I Will Be Grape"	James Ponsoldt	Zack Bornstein	March 11, 2026	T12.20308
30	8	"Depression Diet"	Anu Valia	Emily Wilson	March 18, 2026	T12.20309
31	9	"Daddy Issues"	Anu Valia	Rachna Fruchbom	March 25, 2026	T12.20310
32	10	"The Bodyguard of Sadness"	Randall Keenan Winston	Brett Goldstein & Neil Goldman	April 1, 2026	T12.20311
33	11	"And That's Our Time"	Randall Keenan Winston	Bill Lawrence & Brett Goldstein & Neil Goldman	April 8, 2026	T12.20312

== Production ==
Season 1 poster featuring Harrison Ford and Jason Segel

It was announced in October 2021 that Apple TV+ had ordered a ten-episode season for the series, which would star Jason Segel, who co-created alongside Brett Goldstein and Bill Lawrence. In April 2022, Harrison Ford, Jessica Williams, Christa Miller, Michael Urie, Luke Tennie, and Lukita Maxwell joined the cast, with James Ponsoldt joining the production as a director and executive producer. Production began in April 2022. The first season has a total of ten episodes. The series theme song "Frightening Fishes" was written by Ben Gibbard and Tom Howe.

During a 2023 interview with Harrison Ford for The Hollywood Reporter, author James Hibberd reminded Ford that he had said in 2002 that he was content to work only once per year and asked him why he had accepted the offer to play Dr. Paul Rhoades. Ford replied that he wanted to try new things after a period of not doing as much work as he wished due to the COVID-19 pandemic and his commitments to the titular role of the long-delayed Indiana Jones and the Dial of Destiny. As with his role in 1923, Ford accepted the Shrinking role despite there not being a script at the time, trusting that Segel, Goldstein, Lawrence and Brian Gallivan would deliver him a good script.

In March 2023, Apple TV+ renewed the series for a second season. In June 2024, Ashley Nicole Black joined the second season as a writer and a cast member in an undisclosed capacity. The season filmed from January to June 2024. Ted McGinley, who had a recurring role in the first season, was promoted to series regular for the second season. The show was pitched to Apple as a three-season-show, but the creators are open to continue if a fitting story emerges. On October 17, 2024, Apple TV+ renewed the series for a third season. Filming for the third season began in mid-February 2025 and concluded on July 16, 2025.

Shrinking was renewed for a fourth season in January 2026. Lawrence stated that the original three season story arc will still conclude as planned and the fourth season will begin "a new story with the same cast."

=== Lawsuit ===
In September 2026, it was reported that Mindy Tessa McKoin, a former second assistant director of Shrinking filed a lawsuit against Randall Keenan Winston and WBTV by alleging that the real reason she was fired from the series by Kip Kroeger because of reporting an intentional "sexual abuse" by Winston during the wrap party of the second season in July 2024, as well as her raising a stink about "inaccurate time records and pay statements".

== Release ==
Shrinking was released on January 27, 2023, with the first two episodes premiering together and the rest releasing on a weekly basis on Apple TV+. The second season premiered on October 16, 2024. The third season premiered on January 28, 2026, with a one-hour episode and the rest debuting on a weekly basis until the season finale on April 8.

== Reception ==
=== Critical response ===
Critical response of Shrinking
Season	Rotten Tomatoes	Metacritic
1	91% (94 reviews)	68 (34 reviews)
2	97% (82 reviews)	75 (16 reviews)
3	92% (37 reviews)	76 (8 reviews)

==== Season 1 ====
For the first season, the review aggregator website Rotten Tomatoes reported a 91% approval rating based on 94 critic reviews with an average rating of 7.65/10. The website's critics consensus reads, "Shrinking has darker ideas on its mind than its earnest approach can often translate, but Jason Segel and Harrison Ford's sparkling turns make these characters worth close analysis." Metacritic, which uses a weighted average, assigned a score of 68 out of 100 based on 34 critics, indicating "generally favorable reviews".

Kristen Baldwin of Entertainment Weekly gave the series a B+ and described the series as "a funny, brainy grief-com about the power—and dangers—of radical honesty." Chicago Sun-Times's Richard Roeper gave a rating of 3.5 out of 4 stars and said, "You never know what goes on behind the scenes, but one gets the feeling Ford is having a great time on this show. We're sure having a great time watching it." Writing for The Wall Street Journal, John Anderson stated, "The overall sense is a little like laughing at a funeral; the human impulses are familiar, a little perverse and somehow comforting."

==== Season 2 ====
The second season received positive reviews. On Rotten Tomatoes, the season has a 97% approval rating based on 82 critic reviews with an average rating of 8.3/10. The website's critics consensus states, "Settling into a hangout comedy that's content to luxuriate in these lovable characters' company, Shrinking's appeal only continues to grow in this big-hearted second season." On Metacritic, the season has a score of 75 out of 100 based on 16 critics, indicating "generally favorable reviews".

==== Season 3 ====
On Rotten Tomatoes, the third season holds a 92% approval rating based on 37 critic reviews with an average rating of 7.8/10. The website's critics consensus read, "Shrinking's soothing balm of eager humanity shines through in the series' laugh inducing, heartstring pulling and tender third season." On Metacritic, the season has a score of 76 out of 100 based on 8 critics, indicating "generally favorable reviews".

=== Accolades ===
Award	Year	Category	Nominee(s)	Result	Ref.
American Film Institute Awards	2024	Top Ten Television Programs	Shrinking	Won	
Astra TV Awards	2024	Best Streaming Series, Comedy	Shrinking	Nominated	
Astra TV Awards	2024	Best Actor in a Streaming Series, Comedy	Jason Segel	Nominated	
Astra TV Awards	2024	Best Supporting Actor in a Streaming Series, Comedy	Harrison Ford	Nominated	
Astra TV Awards	2024	Best Supporting Actress in a Streaming Series, Comedy	Jessica Williams	Nominated	
Astra TV Awards	2024	Best Directing in a Streaming Series, Comedy	James Ponsoldt (for "Coin Flip")	Nominated	
Astra TV Awards	2024	Best Writing in a Streaming Series, Comedy	Bill Lawrence, Jason Segel, and Brett Goldstein (for "Coin Flip")	Nominated	
Astra TV Awards	2025	Best Comedy Series	Shrinking	Nominated	
Astra TV Awards	2025	Best Actor in a Comedy Series	Jason Segel	Nominated	
Astra TV Awards	2025	Best Supporting Actor in a Comedy Series	Harrison Ford	Won	
Astra TV Awards	2025	Best Supporting Actor in a Comedy Series	Brett Goldstein	Nominated	
Astra TV Awards	2025	Best Supporting Actor in a Comedy Series	Michael Urie	Nominated	
Astra TV Awards	2025	Best Supporting Actress in a Comedy Series	Jessica Williams	Nominated	
Astra TV Awards	2025	Best Cast Ensemble in a Streaming Comedy Series	Shrinking	Won	
Astra TV Awards	2025	Best Directing in a Comedy Series	Bill Lawrence (for "The Last Thanksgiving")	Nominated	
Astra TV Awards	2025	Best Writing in a Comedy Series	Neil Goldman, Bill Lawrence, and Brett Goldstein (for "The Last Thanksgiving")	Nominated	
Astra TV Awards	2026	Best Comedy Series	Shrinking	Nominated	
Astra TV Awards	2026	Best Actor in a Comedy Series	Jason Segel	Won	
Astra TV Awards	2026	Best Supporting Actor in a Comedy Series	Harrison Ford	Won	
Astra TV Awards	2026	Best Supporting Actor in a Comedy Series	Ted McGinley	Nominated	
Astra TV Awards	2026	Best Supporting Actress in a Comedy Series	Jessica Williams	Nominated	
Astra TV Awards	2026	Best Guest Actor in a Comedy Series	Michael J. Fox	Won	
Astra TV Awards	2026	Best Guest Actor in a Comedy Series	Brett Goldstein	Nominated	
Astra TV Awards	2026	Best Streaming Comedy Ensemble	Shrinking	Won	
Astra TV Awards	2026	Best Directing in a Comedy Series	Shrinking	Nominated	
Astra TV Awards	2026	Best Writing in a Comedy Series	Shrinking	Nominated	
Astra Creative Arts TV Awards	2024	Best Main Title Design	Shrinking	Nominated	
Critics' Choice Television Awards	2024	Best Comedy Series	Shrinking	Nominated	
Critics' Choice Television Awards	2024	Best Supporting Actor in a Comedy Series	Harrison Ford	Nominated	
Critics' Choice Television Awards	2024	Best Supporting Actress in a Comedy Series	Jessica Williams	Nominated	
Critics' Choice Television Awards	2025	Best Supporting Actor in a Comedy Series	Michael Urie	Won	
Golden Globe Awards	2024	Best Actor in a Television Series – Musical or Comedy	Jason Segel	Nominated	
Golden Globe Awards	2025	Best Actor in a Television Series – Musical or Comedy	Jason Segel	Nominated	
Golden Globe Awards	2025	Best Supporting Actor – Series, Miniseries or Television Film	Harrison Ford	Nominated	
Primetime Emmy Awards	2024	Outstanding Lead Actor in a Comedy Series	Jason Segel (for "Imposter Syndrome")	Nominated	
Primetime Emmy Awards	2024	Outstanding Supporting Actress in a Comedy Series	Jessica Williams (for "Boop")	Nominated	
Primetime Emmy Awards	2025	Outstanding Comedy Series	Bill Lawrence, Jason Segel, Brett Goldstein, Neil Goldman, Jeff Ingold, Liza Katzer, Randall Keenan Winston, James Ponsoldt, Annie Mebane, Rachna Fruchbom, Brian Gallivan, Bill Posley, Ashley Nicole Black, and Kip Kroeger	Nominated	
Primetime Emmy Awards	2025	Outstanding Lead Actor in a Comedy Series	Jason Segel (for "The Drugs Don't Work")	Nominated	
Primetime Emmy Awards	2025	Outstanding Supporting Actor in a Comedy Series	Harrison Ford (for "The Last Thanksgiving")	Nominated	
Primetime Emmy Awards	2025	Outstanding Supporting Actor in a Comedy Series	Michael Urie (for "Full Grown Face Dude")	Nominated	
Primetime Emmy Awards	2025	Outstanding Supporting Actress in a Comedy Series	Jessica Williams (for "Changing Patterns")	Nominated	
Primetime Emmy Awards	2026	Outstanding Comedy Series	Bill Lawrence, Jason Segel, Brett Goldstein, Neil Goldman, Jeff Ingold, Liza Katzer, Randall Keenan Winston, James Ponsoldt, Rachna Fruchbom, Brian Gallivan, Bill Posley, Ashley Nicole Black, Kip Kroeger, and Emily Wilson	Nominated	
Primetime Emmy Awards	2026	Outstanding Lead Actor in a Comedy Series	Jason Segel	Nominated	
Primetime Emmy Awards	2026	Outstanding Supporting Actor in a Comedy Series	Harrison Ford	Nominated	
Primetime Emmy Awards	2026	Outstanding Supporting Actor in a Comedy Series	Michael Urie	Nominated	
Primetime Emmy Awards	2026	Outstanding Supporting Actress in a Comedy Series	Jessica Williams	Nominated	
Primetime Creative Arts Emmy Awards	2025	Outstanding Casting for a Comedy Series	Debby Romano and Brett Benner	Nominated	
Primetime Creative Arts Emmy Awards	2025	Outstanding Sound Mixing for a Comedy or Drama Series (Half-Hour) and Animation	Earl Martin, Anna D. Wilborn, Alex Jongbloed, and Trino Madriz (for "The Drugs Don't Work")	Nominated	
Primetime Creative Arts Emmy Awards	2026	Outstanding Casting for a Comedy Series	Brett Benner, Debby Romano, and Daniel Schwab	Nominated	
Primetime Creative Arts Emmy Awards	2026	Outstanding Guest Actor in a Comedy Series	Michael J. Fox	Nominated	
Primetime Creative Arts Emmy Awards	2026	Outstanding Guest Actor in a Comedy Series	Brett Goldstein	Nominated	
Primetime Creative Arts Emmy Awards	2026	Outstanding Short Form Nonfiction or Reality Series	Shrinking – In It Together	Nominated	
Primetime Creative Arts Emmy Awards	2026	Outstanding Sound Mixing for a Comedy or Drama Series (Half-Hour) and Animation	Earl Martin, Anna D. Wilborn, Jamison Rabbe, Tami Treadwell, Jeffrey Roy, and Alex Jongbloed (for "I Will Be Grape")	Nominated	
Screen Actors Guild Awards	2025	Outstanding Performance by a Male Actor in a Comedy Series	Harrison Ford	Nominated	
Screen Actors Guild Awards	2025	Outstanding Performance by an Ensemble in a Comedy Series	Harrison Ford, Brett Goldstein, Devin Kawaoka, Gavin Lewis, Wendie Malick, Lukita Maxwell, Ted McGinley, Christa Miller, Jason Segel, Rachel Stubington, Luke Tennie, Michael Urie, and Jessica Williams	Nominated	
Set Decorators Society of America Awards	2026	Best Achievement in Décor/Design of a Half-Hour Single-Camera Series	Andrea Fenton, Cabot McMullen	Nominated	
Television Critics Association Awards	2023	Outstanding Achievement in Comedy	Shrinking	Nominated	
Television Critics Association Awards	2023	Outstanding New Program	Shrinking	Nominated	
Television Critics Association Awards	2023	Individual Achievement in Comedy	Harrison Ford	Nominated	
Television Critics Association Awards	2025	Outstanding Achievement in Comedy	Shrinking	Nominated	
Television Critics Association Awards	2025	Individual Achievement in Comedy	Harrison Ford	Nominated	
Television Critics Association Awards	2026	Program of the Year	Shrinking	Nominated	
Television Critics Association Awards	2026	Outstanding Achievement in Comedy	Shrinking	Nominated	
Television Critics Association Awards	2026	Individual Achievement in Comedy	Harrison Ford	Nominated	
Venice TV Awards	2023	Best Comedy	Shrinking	Won	
Writers Guild of America Awards	2024	New Series	Wally Baram, Rachna Fruchbom, Brian Gallivan, Neil Goldman, Brett Goldstein, Bill Lawrence, Annie Mebane, Bill Posley, Jason Segel, and Sofia Selig	Nominated	
