= Rachel Stubington =

American actress

- Born: Los Angeles, California
- Occupation: Actress
- Years active: 2014–present

Rachel Stubington (born June 22, 2000) is an American actress. She is best known for playing Summer in the comedy drama series Shrinking.

== Early life ==
Stubington was born in Los Angeles, California. Her interest in acting began from watching Saturday Night Live and re-acting the parts with her three brothers. She would create sketches with her friends when she was away at a Jewish sleepaway camp. Her interest in the performing arts was honed in high school, where she appeared as Marty in Grease and won awards for her performance as Inga in Young Frankenstein. She is Jewish.

== Career ==
Her first film leading role came playing Dana Carlson in the drama thriller A Rose for Her Grave: The Randy Roth Story. She made a one-off appearance in the medical drama series Doctor Odyssey. She achieved further success playing Summer in the drama series Shrinking starring Harrison Ford and Jason Segel. She is due to star in an upcoming drama series called More.

== Filmography ==
=== Film ===
Year	Title	Role	Notes
2014	Abaddon	Gretel	
2020	The First Taste	Clio	Short
2023	A Rose for Her Grave: The Randy Roth Story	Dana Carlson	
2024	Grassland	Girl	
2025	Freemium 911	Chatbot	Short
2025	Kidnapped by a Killer: The Heather Robinson Story	Heather	
2025	Locker Room Talk	Maddie	Short
2025	Copy, Credit, No Pay	Rachel	

=== Television ===
Year	Title	Role	Notes
2021	Generation	April	Episode; Absolute Zero
2022	The Seagull	Yakov	2 episodes
2024	Doctor Odyssey	Rhea	Episode; Pilot
2023–present	Shrinking	Summer	13 episodes
2025	More	Heather	Episode; 1.1
