= Cheers season 6 =

Cheers
- Season 6
- Region 1 DVD
- Showrunners: David Angell; Peter Casey; David Lee
- Starring: Ted Danson; Kirstie Alley; Rhea Perlman; John Ratzenberger; Woody Harrelson; Kelsey Grammer; George Wendt
- No. of episodes: 25

Release
- Original network: NBC
- Original release: September 24, 1987 – May 7, 1988

Season chronology
- ← Previous; Season 5 Next → Season 7

The sixth season of the American television sitcom Cheers aired on NBC from September 24, 1987 to May 7, 1988. The show was created by director James Burrows and writers Glen and Les Charles under their production company Charles Burrows Charles Productions, in association with Paramount Television. This season features the debut of Kirstie Alley as Rebecca Howe.

== Background ==
Cheers survived low ratings in the first season and changes to the Thursday evening schedule of NBC's primetime block Must See TV, and retained its regular Thursday 9:00 pm Eastern / 8:00 pm Central slot. In its original broadcast run, 1987–88, Cheers was scheduled with The Cosby Show, A Different World, Night Court, and hour-long drama L.A. Law. An hour-long crime drama Hill Street Blues was moved from Thursdays to Tuesdays in 1986 and ended in 1987 after its seven-year run. The sitcom Family Ties moved from Thursday to Sundays in 1987–88.

== Cast and characters ==
- Ted Danson as Sam Malone, a bartender and ex-baseball player. Sam sells the bar to a corporation. Six months later, he becomes the bartender again but no longer owns the bar. Since his last breakup with Diane Chambers, a former waitress, he pursues many women but fails to impress some, especially classier ones.
- Kirstie Alley as Rebecca Howe, a corporate bar owner and manager. She is attracted to the head of the Lilian Corporation, Evan Drake (Tom Skerritt), who barely notices her. At the season finale, Evan Drake moves to Japan, depriving her from going beyond her puppy love for him.
- Rhea Perlman as Carla Tortelli, a bitter waitress and mother of eight children, including five from her first marriage. Carla marries Eddie LeBec after she becomes pregnant with their twin boy and girl. (The season incorporated Rhea Perlman's real-life pregnancy, which began before the sixth season premiered. Both Perlman and Carla were pregnant in the first season and in the third.)
- John Ratzenberger as Cliff Clavin, a postal carrier and loquacious bar know-it-all. Cliff and his mother Esther (Frances Sternhagen) move out of their home when it was demolished, so they move to a condominium.
- Woody Harrelson as Woody Boyd, a dim bartender
- Kelsey Grammer as Dr. Frasier Crane, a psychiatrist who is engaged to Dr. Lilith Sternin
- George Wendt as Norm Peterson, a part-time accountant and painter

Recurring characters

- Bebe Neuwirth as Dr. Lilith Sternin, a psychiatrist and fiancée of Frasier Crane
- Jay Thomas as Eddie LeBec, a retired hockey player who currently works as an ice show performer. He marries Carla after impregnating her with a twin boy and girl.
- Timothy Williams and Mandy Ingber as Anthony and Annie Tortelli, a young, married couple. Since the cancellation of the spin-off The Tortellis, Anthony and Annie Tortelli move from Las Vegas to Boston to live with Carla. They are kicked out by Carla for having a baby at their young age.
- Tom Skerritt as Evan Drake, Rebecca's corporate boss.
- Al Rosen as Al, an elderly bar regular.

== Episodes ==
No. overall	No. in season	Title	Directed by	Written by	Original release date	Rating/share/rank (households)
122	1	"Home Is the Sailor"	James Burrows	Glen Charles & Les Charles	September 24, 1987	28.4 / 44 / #3
After Sam and Diane break up, Sam sells Cheers to the Lillian Corporation and leaves Boston on his new yacht. Six months later, the yacht sinks and he returns to Cheers where he finds changes; employees must wear uniforms, Carla is pregnant with Eddie's child, the bartender is Wayne (Jonathan Stark), and Rebecca Howe is the bar manager, who rejects Sam's advances. Sam wants to work as a bartender again, but one bartender must be fired. Sam and Wayne compete to make a Screaming Viking, an unknown cocktail invented by Sam's friends. Wayne loses the contest and quits. Rebecca promises to fire Sam if he tries another trick. In 1997, TV Guide ranked this episode #45 on its list of the 100 Greatest Episodes.
123	2	"I on Sports"	James Burrows	Ken Levine & David Isaacs	October 1, 1987	26.1 / 41 / #4
Sam accepts an offer from his friend, sportscaster Dave Richards (Fred Dryer), to temporarily replace him for a week but tries to hide this from Rebecca, who he believes would never let him take a break. On his first day, Sam delivers sports news well, but his commentary is less than inspiring. Even when Rebecca discovers this, she allows Sam a week's leave. Sam fails to impress people onscreen by rapping and with ventriloquy.
124	3	"Little Carla, Happy at Last"	James Burrows	Cheri Eichen & Bill Steinkellner	October 15, 1987	25.3 / 40 / #3
125	4	"Little Carla, Happy at Last"	James Burrows	Cheri Eichen & Bill Steinkellner	October 22, 1987	22.8 / 34 / #8
Part 1: Carla plans to marry Eddie and plans to quit waitressing due to Eddie's career. Rebecca refuses to allow the wedding reception in the bar until Sam persuades Rebecca that the reception will impress her boss Mr. Drake. A week later on their wedding day, Carla sees Eddie before the wedding, which is traditionally bad luck. Carla gets a phone call that she is having twins. Carla's son Anthony and his wife Annie arrive from Las Vegas to live with Carla, overcrowding her house. Anthony meets Eddie and immediately dislikes him. Eddie's mother meets Carla and dislikes her for being a pregnant bride. Eddie cancels the wedding and runs off. Part 2: Rebecca puts Sam in charge of Carla's wedding plans and reluctantly promises to no longer make employees wear uniforms if he can salvage the wedding. Sam persuades Carla and Eddie to reconcile with each other. Woody announces that the church has canceled the wedding, so Carla and Eddie get married at a clergy house instead. Eddie is fired from the Boston Bruins hockey team and replaced with a younger player. No other teams will hire him. Carla decides to be a waitress again. Carla and Eddie dismiss the unfortunate events that occurred before the wedding as just bad luck. Rebecca gets drunk when Mr. Drake does not arrive. Cheers was postponed on October 8, 1987, due to Game Two of the 1987 American League Championship Series. On the West Coast, the show's rerun was broadcast.
126	5	"The Crane Mutiny"	James Burrows	David Angell	October 29, 1987	26.8 / 41 / #3
Frasier tells his friends about a recent argument with Lilith. Norm and Cliff trick him into thinking Rebecca is coming on to him. He tells Lilith about his feelings about another woman and asks Rebecca out, but realizes his mistake when Rebecca does not recognize him. Frasier tries unsuccessfully to reconcile with Lilith, and proposes to her. She accepts.
127	6	"Paint Your Office"	James Burrows	Peter Casey & David Lee	November 5, 1987	26.0 / 40 / #3
Rebecca cuts off Norm due to his unpaid tab and hires him as a painter. Rebecca complains about her life to Norm, who befriends her. The following day, Rebecca lets Norm drink again and hires him to paint her apartment. Sam assists Norm, hoping to seduce her at home, but badly fails.
128	7	"The Last Angry Mailman"	James Burrows	Ken Levine & David Isaacs	November 12, 1987	26.4 / 40 / #2
Cliff's mother Esther (Frances Sternhagen) approves the demolition of their old home for $250,000 from a real estate agent. The following day, Cliff cuffs himself to a pole as a protest. Esther alerts Norm, who releases Cliff with a chainsaw, causing the house to collapse. The Cheers regulars learn from Frasier's colleagues that, when she was a college student, Rebecca was a party girl and was nicknamed "Backseat Becky". Rather than admit the truth, Rebecca tells Sam a false story she bought from Carla.
129	8	"Bidding on the Boys"	Thomas Lofaro	David Lloyd	November 19, 1987	26.4 / 41 / #3
At a charity auction of bachelors held by Rebecca and an MC (Gary Beach), Woody is bought by a cigarette-smoking, middle-aged woman for $400, and Lilith buys Sam for $2,000 to spite Frasier for his prenuptial agreement plan. Sam and Lilith go to an inn. Under Sam's instructions, Frasier follows them. Lilith seduces Sam, who tries to resist. Frasier is shocked when he sees Lilith and Sam kissing. When Sam leaves, Lilith tells Frasier that she did not intend to have an affair with Sam and that she was aware of Frasier's presence. Frasier and Lilith reconcile.
130	9	"Pudd'n Head Boyd" "Puddin' Head Boyd"	James Burrows	Cheri Eichen & Bill Steinkellner	November 26, 1987	19.5 / 36 / #8
Woody portrays Mark Twain as an understudy at a community theater. Dressed as Twain, Woody meets elderly widow Mary (Anne Pitoniak), who becomes attracted to him because of the outfit. When Woody is about to reveal his true identity, Mary admits that she knew Woody is three times younger than her and simply enjoyed his company. Sad that he did not get the role, Woody gives a portrayal of Twain for the bar customers. Frasier and Lilith take a Caribbean cruise to relax from the stresses of their jobs.
131	10	"A Kiss Is Still a Kiss"	James Burrows	David Lloyd	December 3, 1987	23.5 / 36 / #4
When Mr. Drake invites Rebecca to his party and mistakes her for a lesbian, Rebecca reluctantly takes Sam along to prove him wrong. Frasier is angry because his paper was rebutted by a college professor, and develops hiccups. At the party, Rebecca humiliates herself by kissing Mr. Drake in front of other guests, prompting him to kick her out. Later, when Drake arrives to apologize, Sam convinces Rebecca that he's furious and she should claim she used the kiss to make Sam jealous. Rebecca kisses Sam, only to learn Drake was never really angry. After Drake leaves, Rebecca tells Sam that their kiss meant nothing. She kisses Frasier to prove her fakery, causing his hiccups to return.
132	11	"My Fair Clavin"	James Burrows	Phoef Sutton	December 10, 1987	23.1 / 36 / #4
Cliff moves out of Norm's house, buys a condominium, and begins to date Sally (Karen Akers), a homely woman. Ashamed of Sally's looks, Cliff gives her a makeover with the help of beauty magazines, suggested by Rebecca. When Cliff takes Sally to Cheers, one of male patrons takes Sally out, leaving Cliff alone. Some time later, Sally tells Cliff that she likes her new look and that Cliff will have to deal with it. Rebecca relapses into smoking cigarettes. Frasier suggests Rebecca swear to do something 'disgusting and repulsive' if she smokes again. She tells Sam that she'll sleep with him if she smokes. Unable to hide her cigarettes from Sam, Rebecca reluctantly decides to sleep with him. Sam loses interest in seducing unwilling, unenthusiastic Rebecca but then regrets turning her down.
133	12	"Christmas Cheers"	James Burrows & Thomas Lofaro	Cheri Eichen & Bill Steinkellner	December 17, 1987	25.5 / 40 / #3
Rebecca schedules all Cheers employees to work on Christmas Eve, delaying Sam's intimate plans. Woody cancels his Christmas plans in Indiana for a children's play in Boston. Carla does not mind working, but wants to celebrate the Eve before late night. She is annoyed when Al's (Al Rosen) friends arrive at 10:30 pm, packing the bar. While the regulars exchange presents, Sam searches for a last-minute gift for Rebecca and buys a pair of diamond earrings, which he mistakes for earmuffs, worth $500 from a stranger named Tracy (Jayne Modean). As a reward, Rebecca invites Sam to her apartment for supper. Sam gives up a date with Tracy to attend, only to realize everyone was invited. Norm gets a job as a shopping mall Santa and spends the evening drinking with other Santas, disgusting an already cynical Frasier. When they briefly mistake one of Norm's coworkers as the real Santa Claus, Frasier regains his Christmas spirit. Cliff tries to beat Walt Twitchell at his post office's food drive contest to win a trip to Walt Disney World but is edged out. The character Walt Twitchell does not appear onscreen. Actor Raye Birk reprises this character in "A Diminished Rebecca with a Suspended Cliff" (1992).
134	13	"Woody for Hire Meets Norman of the Apes"	Tim Berry	Phoef Sutton	January 7, 1988	28.1 / 41 / #2
Norm refuses to paint Cliff's apartment for free. In retribution, Cliff claims a monkey that he rented did the paint job, insulting Norm. Norm retaliates by having the monkey in a mailman suit, insulting Cliff. Rebecca introduces a book club event to replace the men's Sunday pool tournament. The old ladies proceed to get drunk and wild, coming on to Sam and Frasier. Woody tells his friends that he will appear as an extra on the crime series Spenser: For Hire, starring Robert Urich (himself). The episode airs, but he does not appear onscreen, so Woody's friends are skeptical. Robert Urich visits Cheers and invites Woody to a party, but everyone misses seeing him.
135	14	"And God Created Woodman"	John Ratzenberger	Jeffrey Duteil	January 14, 1988	27.9 / 41 / #3
Rebecca reluctantly invites bartenders Sam and Woody to serve at a party of one of her big bosses, Daniel Collier (Peter Hansen). At the party, Woody dumps trash into Mr. Collier's large, valuable vase. Rebecca tries to clean the vase but breaks it. Woody takes the blame. Mr. Collier is impressed with his moxie and gets drunk with Woody, inviting him to a ski weekend. Unfortunately, the following day a hungover Collier does not remember any of the events. Sam takes the blame, and Mr. Collier invites Sam to ski. Cliff sells the men fashionable dress shoes, but they make annoying squeaking noises.
136	15	"Tale of Two Cuties"	Michael Zinberg	Cheri Eichen & Bill Steinkellner	January 21, 1988	26.9 / 40 / #3
Carla gives birth to twins—a boy and girl. During Carla's absence, Sam and Rebecca hire two temporary waitresses—Annie, Carla's daughter-in-law and Laurie (Bobbie Eakes), a pretty young woman recommended by Mr. Drake. Within a few weeks, to spite her husband Anthony for his unemployment, Annie repeatedly flirts with Sam. Sam finds Anthony a job, so Annie can quit. Rebecca thinks that Laurie is Mr. Drake's lover; she slaps Laurie but regrets it when she discovers that Laurie is Mr. Drake's daughter. Laurie resigns her job, while Rebecca unsuccessfully begs forgiveness. To retaliate for spoiling endings of other works, Frasier spoils the endings of Citizen Kane, Murder on the Orient Express, and The Empire Strikes Back. This has no effect on bar patrons, but only Woody is shocked that Luke Skywalker is Darth Vader's son.
137	16	"Yacht of Fools"	Thomas Lofaro	Phoef Sutton	February 4, 1988	24.9 / 37 / #3
Mr. Drake invites Sam and Rebecca for a weekend on his yacht. Rebecca still pines for Mr. Drake, and Sam brings his casual fling Julia along, posing as his sister. On the yacht, Julia is close to sleeping with Mr. Drake, but Mr. Drake feels too guilty. Instead, Julia goes to bed with Mr. Drake's cook. Rebecca, impressed with Drake's honesty, foils Sam's attempt to seduce her. Bar patrons manipulate gullible Woody into giving them free beers as birthday gifts.
138	17	"To All the Girls I've Loved Before"	James Burrows	Ken Levine & David Isaacs	February 11, 1988	24.7 / 36 / #4
Frasier chooses Sam as his best man, and Lilith picks Rebecca as her bridesmaid. Sam hosts Frasier's bachelor party at Cheers, and Rebecca hosts Lilith's bachelorette party at her apartment. At Frasier's party, Frasier recognizes the female stripper (Karen Witter) as one of his patients. After the stripper leaves, the party becomes depressing. Lilith, drunk, is brought in and abandoned by the male stripper from the other party. After a series of their own wedding jitters and fantasies, Frasier and Lilith reconcile.
139	18	"Let Sleeping Drakes Lie"	James Burrows	David Lloyd	February 18, 1988	19.4 / 28 / #6
Frasier tells Sam about a patient who is aroused by male dancers. Sam mistakes a female pyromaniac for the other patient and pretends to be a dancer in effort to impress her. Norm invites Rebecca to Mr. Drake's house, where he is repainting the bedroom. Mr. Drake returns unexpectedly, so Rebecca hides herself in a closet. Rebecca tries to escape with Norm's help, but the creaky closet door, Mr. Drake's light-headed sleepiness, and his butler Greyson make them unsuccessful. In a final attempt, Norm tells Mr. Drake—annoyed and drowsy in pajamas—that Norm's lifelong dream was to carry a rich man across the lawn in his pajamas, so Mr. Drake reluctantly lets Norm carry him around the garden. Cliff distracts Greyson, and the rest of the gang use the ladder to help Rebecca escape from the second floor.
140	19	"Airport V"	George Wendt	Ken Levine & David Isaacs	February 25, 1988	20.4 / 30 / #7
Eddie becomes an ice skater in a penguin suit for ice shows, and invites Carla to see the show in Seattle. She is reluctant to go. At first she seems ashamed of Eddie's current job, but she later admits that she fears flying. To challenge her fears, Carla participates in one of Frasier's plane therapy sessions. When the flight ends, Carla has overcome her fears but Frasier is now afraid to fly. Later, Carla flies to Seattle without problems while Frasier is still traumatized. Rebecca dates a very negative bar critic who gives Cheers a more positive review than his last one, leading everyone to think Rebecca slept with him. Coincidentally, in the spin-off Frasier, Seattle is discovered to be Frasier's birthplace.
141	20	"The Sam in the Gray Flannel Suit"	Tim Berry	Cheri Eichen & Bill Steinkellner	March 3, 1988	25.9 / 39 / #3
Mr. Drake promotes Sam to sales executive, devastating Rebecca. Sam tells Rebecca that he was promoted just after the company reached the playoffs in the corporate softball league. Rebecca realizes that Sam was hired as the company's "ringer" and will be fired after the season. She tells Sam about this, but Sam does not believe her until he confronts Drake who admits the truth. Sam reflects that he would rather be a bartender than an executive.
142	21	"Our Hourly Bread"	Andy Ackerman	Sue Herring	March 10, 1988	24.9 / 38 / #2
Cliff announces his raise at the post office. Woody and Sam want a raise, but the bar's takings have been declining for three months, risking closure. To increase takings, Sam and Woody raffle a Caribbean cruise, attracting many customers. Woody draws a ball ambiguously marked 66 or 99 without an underline, resulting in two winners. Since the trip is expensive, awarding them the same trip is impossible. Frasier buys for his and Lilith's one-month anniversary a painting supposedly representing "man's struggle against intransigent fate," which Lilith considers a painting of dogs. Instead, Frasier gives her the keys to his Mercedes-Benz car. Sam awards number 66 the painting left behind by Frasier and number 99 the Caribbean cruise. For the raffle's consolation prize, Woody draws another ball supposedly marked 11, prompting him to fear another crisis.
143	22	"Slumber Party Massacred"	James Burrows	Phoef Sutton	March 24, 1988	25.1 / 40 / #3
Carla reacts badly when Anthony and Annie announce they are going to be parents, and spends four days at home depressed about becoming a grandmother. During Carla's absence, Cheers goes through four temporary waitresses, one of whom Rebecca fires for going topless. Rebecca, Lilith, and Lilith's friend Dorothy try to cheer up Carla with a slumber party, but Carla rejects their efforts. Rebecca invites the men over to crash the party. Carla angrily throws everyone out, stating that she will recover from her depression on her own and that something always snaps her out of it. When Cliff accidentally splits his pants, Carla starts laughing.
144	23	"Bar Wars"	James Burrows	Ken Levine & David Isaacs	March 31, 1988	23.2 / 39 / #3
Sam and his Cheers gang have lost 173 sporting competitions to their rival, Gary (Robert Desiderio) and Gary's Old Town Tavern. Gary's gang steals Cheers' bowling trophy and then returns it broken to Sam and Woody. Both bar gangs retaliate each other with gag after gag until Gary gives up the war and sends Wade Boggs to Cheers to sign autographs. When Boggs enters, the Cheers gang attacks him and steals his pants, assuming him to be an impostor. They later regret this when they find he really is Boggs, verified by his wallet. Nevertheless, the Cheers gang optimistically treats Boggs's possessions as their victory against Gary's gang. This is the first of 7 episodes in the "Bar Wars" sequence of titles (usually one or two "Bar Wars" episodes aired each season from seasons 6 through 11). However, it is not the first episode in which the Cheers/Gary's rivalry is featured: the concept was first introduced and explored in season 4, episode 9 ("From Beer To Eternity"). Joel Polis and Robert Desiderio alternately reprise the same role of Gary in other episodes.
145	24	"The Big Kiss-Off"	James Burrows	Ken Levine & David Isaacs	April 28, 1988	23.6 / 38 / #2
Sam and Woody make a bet to be the first to kiss Rebecca by the end of the day. Sam pretends to choke and need CPR mouth to mouth but quickly recovers when Al volunteers. Woody uses a love scene from a play and attempts to kiss her in the office, but Sam interrupts. When Rebecca offers Carla a paid day off, Carla tells her about the bet. Rebecca individually tells Sam and then Woody about the bet and tells each to win. Later, Sam unwittingly kisses Woody on the couch in the unlit office, horrifying them as planned by Rebecca and the others. Rebecca tells them that she must not be used again.
146	25	"Backseat Becky, Up Front"	James Burrows	Cheri Eichen & Bill Steinkellner	May 5, 1988	22.8 / 38 / #1
Mr. Drake is moving to Tokyo, upsetting Rebecca. Sam locks Mr. Drake's chauffeur in the cellar. After a party in the bar, Rebecca hijacks the limousine and fails to admit her feelings when Mr. Drake brings his fiancée along. Rebecca wrecks the limo and is arrested for driving without a chauffeur license; Sam bails her out and takes her to her apartment. With Mr. Drake gone, Sam is about to exploit her loss for sex, but she calls him her "best friend" and he leaves her apartment, unwilling to take advantage of her.

== Production ==
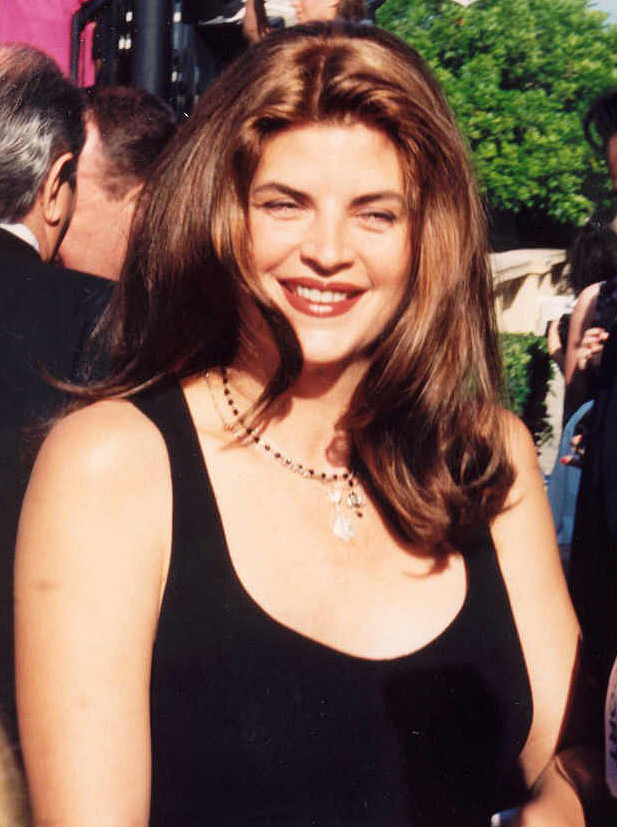
Kirstie Alley debuts this season as Rebecca Howe to replace Shelley Long's character Diane Chambers.

When Cheers premiered in 1982, the creators intended it to be a comedy about a Boston bar, but they decided to focus on the romance between Sam and Diane that dominated the show for five seasons. James Burrows said the couple would have diminished the importance and relevance of the bar setting if Shelley Long had not left the show in 1987. With Diane Chambers written out in last season's finale, "I Do, Adieu", the producers planned to change the show's format without losing the bar. According to Les Charles, Sam was a straight man to Diane; with Diane gone, they made him more carefree and a "goof-off".

We thought of the part as a martinet, a bitch. Then we met [Alley] and there was this vulnerability, so we made her the neurotic woman of the [1980s].

— James Burrows, People, October 1990

When Long decided to leave the show, the creators decided to find a new female lead who was unknown to television viewers, would not have blonde hair, and would not resemble Long. Brunette-haired actress Kirstie Alley, who appeared in the 1982 film Star Trek II: The Wrath of Khan, the miniseries North and South, and recent film Summer School, was one of the first actresses to audition for the role of Rebecca Howe, an executive businesswoman as Diane Chambers was originally conceived. Although Alley met all the criteria, the producers continued to audition actresses. None improved on Alley's portrayal of the character, so Alley was cast as Rebecca Howe.

Because of a Writers Guild of America strike in 1988, the season's cliffhanger finale that revolved around Sam's fears of catching AIDS from an old girlfriend was canceled. Les Charles stated that the AIDS plot was so serious that it took all the humor out of the episode. This episode was withdrawn during rehearsals and was replaced by "Backseat Becky, Up Front", which was filmed out-of-sequence.

== Reception ==
When the season first aired, it scored an overall 23.7 rating (21 million households) as of April 21, 1988. Ron Weiskind of Pittsburgh Post-Gazette praised Kirstie Alley's debut performance and was pleased that departing from the "Sam and Diane" story arc helped the show keep fresh. However, Weiskind criticized this season for "lacking energy and spark". He deemed the two-part episode "Little Carla, Happy at Last" "a slipshod effort with [flat lines, miscalculated situations], indifferent performances, and sagging direction".

This season has been reviewed in later years. Jeffrey Robinson of DVD Talk awarded this season four stars out of five. He praised the chemistry of Frasier and Lilith and found their stories funny; he also praised new character Rebecca Howe and old characters. He chose "I on Sports" as one of his favorites and found this season's remaining episodes "delightful [and] entertaining". David Johnson of DVD Verdict gave the acting in the season 95 percent, calling it "great". Johnson gave this season 85 percent, calling it "laugh-out-loud funny"; he praised the bar scenes, yet found scenes outside the bar "flat". Total Film gave this season four stars out of five. Todd Fuller of Sitcoms Online praised Kirstie Alley's "comedic skills" and chemistry with Ted Danson, and found the writing "similar" to other seasons, despite changes over the years.

Clifford Wheatley of IGN in 2014 ranked episodes "Bar Wars" seventh and "Home Is the Sailor" second out of his top ten Cheers episodes.

== Accolades ==
Andy Ackerman won an Emmy Award in 1988 for an Outstanding Editing in a Multi-camera Production Series for editing the episode "The Big Kiss-Off" (1988) and was the only award winner of this season. The show was nominated as an Outstanding Comedy Series of the season. All of the cast except Bebe Neuwirth were nominated for the respective Lead and Supporting categories. "The Last Angry Mailman" (1987) earned the sound mixing crew a nomination for an Outstanding Sound Mixing for a Comedy Series or a Special. The season premiere "Home Is the Sailor" earned Glen and Les Charles a nomination for an Outstanding Writing in a Comedy Series. The season finale "Backseat Becky, Up Front" earned James Burrows a nomination for Outstanding Directing in a Comedy Series.

== DVD release ==
Season six of Cheers has been released as a DVD boxset containing four discs. This release has no special features, interviews or commentaries. Jeffrey Robinson of DVD Talk awarded the standard of the audio and video two and a half stars out of five, calling the video "a little dirty with a trace of grain" and audio "fairly good, clear, and crisp, [but] very flat". David Johnson of DVD Verdict rated the audio and video quality 80 percent each.

Cheers: The Complete Sixth Season
Set Details
25 episodes; 4-disc set; 1:33:1 aspect ratio; English – Stereo; Closed captioning (Region 1); Subtitles: Danish, Dutch, English, Norwegian, Spanish (Region 2)
Release dates
Region 1	Region 2	Region 4
September 13, 2005	May 14, 2007	May 3, 2007

== Notes ==
=== References ===
- Bjorklund, Dennis A (September 2017). Cheers TV Show: A Comprehensive Reference (e-Book ed.). Praetorian Publishing. ISBN 9780967985237.

=== Ratings notes ===
Unless otherwise, the main source of Nielsen ratings is the newspaper Pittsburgh Post-Gazette. According to that main source, ratings of 1987–88 were based on 88.6 million households that have at least one television.
