= Cheers season 5 =

Cheers
- Season 5
- Region 1 DVD
- Showrunners: David Angell; Peter Casey; David Lee
- Starring: Ted Danson; Shelley Long; Rhea Perlman; John Ratzenberger; Woody Harrelson; Kelsey Grammer; George Wendt
- No. of episodes: 26

Release
- Original network: NBC
- Original release: September 25, 1986 – May 7, 1987

Season chronology
- ← Previous; Season 4 Next → Season 6

The fifth season of the American television sitcom Cheers aired on NBC from September 25, 1986 to May 7, 1987. This season marks the departure of Shelley Long as Diane Chambers, bringing an end to the Sam and Diane relationship (although Long would return for the series finale). The show was created by director James Burrows and writers Glen and Les Charles (as Charles Burrows Charles Productions), in association with Paramount Television.

== Background ==
After two seasons of struggle with low ratings and schedule shifts NBC's Best Night of Television on Television 1984–85 Thursday lineup, consisting of (from 8 pm Eastern) The Cosby Show, Family Ties, Cheers, Night Court and Hill Street Blues, was a ratings success. After two years with the same lineup, the crime series Hill Street Blues moved to Tuesdays in November 1986 to compete with Moonlighting, while the court series L.A. Law moved from Fridays to Hill Street Blues' former slot. In April 1987 Nothing in Common replaced Night Court, which had moved to Wednesdays.

Before the season began, a telephone survey asked callers whom they thought Sam was calling in the last episode of the previous season: politician Janet Eldridge or his on-and-off girlfriend, Diane Chambers. Nearly 140 picked Diane, while almost 60 chose Janet. Callers who voted for either woman expected the love triangle to continue during this season, or felt that Sam and Diane should live happily ever after.

== Cast and characters ==
- Ted Danson as Sam Malone – Womanizing ex-baseball player, bar owner and bartender
- Shelley Long as Diane Chambers – Sophisticated waitress
- Rhea Perlman as Carla Tortelli – Harsh waitress and divorced mother of six, who begins a relationship with Boston Bruins hockey player Eddie LeBec
- John Ratzenberger as Cliff Clavin – Postal worker and loquacious know-it-all bar patron, who continues to be unlucky with women
- Woody Harrelson as Woody Boyd – Dim bartender, originally from Indiana
- Kelsey Grammer as Frasier Crane – Psychiatrist and bar patron. He dates Lilith again, becomes engaged and moves in with her. (Note: After two years of recurring appearances, Grammer was included in the opening credits during this and subsequent seasons.)
- George Wendt as Norm Peterson – Accountant and bar patron, who continues to change jobs frequently
- Bebe Neuwirth as Lilith Sternin – Psychiatrist and Frasier's fiancée (Note: After appearing in "Second Time Around" (1986) the previous season, Neuwirth appeared in two episodes this season: "Abnormal Psychology" (1986) and "Dinner at Eight-ish" (1987).)

Notes

The first episode of the season reveals that it was Diane whom Sam had called; his proposal was rejected because Diane thought he was on the rebound from Janet. After rejecting a number of other proposals during the season, Diane accepts Sam's proposal after a judge compelled him to propose once more. Diane's ex-fiancé, Sumner Sloane, tells her one of his colleagues was impressed with her manuscript and forwarded it to a publisher. At their much-anticipated wedding, just before saying "I do" Sam and Diane receive the news that the publisher will give Diane a large advance to finish her book. They cancel the wedding, and Diane promises she will return in six months after finishing the book. Not knowing it is for the last time, Diane leaves Boston (and Cheers) behind.

== Episodes ==
No. overall	No. in season	Title	Directed by	Written by	Original release date	Rating/share/rank (households)
96	1	"The Proposal"	James Burrows	Peter Casey & David Lee	September 25, 1986	30.0 / 46 / #3
It is revealed that it was Diane to whom Sam proposed on the telephone in the last episode. She declines the proposal as premature and unromantic, asking Sam to repeat it in a more-suitable setting. On a sailboat suggested by Cliff, Diane turns Sam down again, citing Sam's reference to ex-lover Janet Eldridge as the reason, prompting her to feel that Sam may be doing this to forget Janet. Sam sails off in a lifeboat, leaving Diane behind. Several days later Diane asks Sam to propose again, but he refuses, saying that the proposal has "expired".
97	2	"The Cape Cad"	James Burrows	Andy Cowan & David S. Williger	October 2, 1986	29.7 / 45 / #3
Sam's date, Vicki (Brenda Strong), checks out of a country inn to visit her grandmother in the hospital. To keep Diane—who has followed them there—from finding out, Sam offers a $50 bribe to a middle-aged couple to make noise in the bathroom; however, his plan fails when the husband comes out of the bathroom. Diane decides to be honest, telling Sam how foolish they are about their relationship. They later apologize and decide to make love, but Diane changes her mind and leaves. Carla brings her new cat to the bar where it unexpectedly has kittens.
98	3	"Money Dearest"	James Burrows	Janet Leahy	October 9, 1986	26.4 / 38 / #3
Cliff fixes his mother, Esther (Frances Sternhagen), up with the wealthy Duncan Fitzgerald (Richard Erdman). When Esther and Duncan become engaged, she suggests that he donate his fortune to charity. Since Cliff cannot afford to pay for their parties and support them financially, Sam throws a bachelor party for Duncan at the bar. Duncan dies during the party, throwing Esther and the other guests into mourning.
99	4	"Abnormal Psychology"	James Burrows	Janet Leahy	October 16, 1986	29.8 / 44 / #3
Frasier reluctantly agrees to a talk-show debate with his former girlfriend, Lilith Sternin. Convinced that they may be in love, Diane gives Lilith a makeover. During the debate they sprinkle psychiatric jargon with double entendres, playing footsie with each other. After the show they regret their unprofessional behavior, until Lilith lets her hair down again. Overwhelmed, he kisses her and takes her home. To convince the unenthusiastic Norm and Cliff to go fishing with him, Woody tempts them with his RV's features. Sam gets a concert ticket as a gift from a customer and gives it to Diane, who badgers Sam until he agrees to be her date.
100	5	"House of Horrors with Formal Dining and Used Brick"	James Burrows	David Angell	October 30, 1986	27.2 / 41 / #5
Carla is thrilled to move into a reasonably-priced, older home (at Cliff's suggestion). When she discovers the house was built on the graveyard of a 17th-century prison, she assumes that that is the reason for the low price. Diane and Sam convince her to stay at the new house overnight. Norm and Cliff join her, but Norm quickly chickens out. Cliff is ready to leave since they cannot stand each other's company, but Carla dances with him and wins him over. At dawn, after a night's sleep, Cliff and Carla are awakened by shaking, loud noises and bright lights. These are caused by a jet, and Carla is relieved that the house's price is due to its proximity of the airport. Cheers was preempted by the fifth game of the 1986 World Series on October 23, 1986. In the pregame segment of the third game, Bob Costas interviewed Sam and the other characters in the bar.
101	6	"Tan 'n' Wash"	James Burrows	Cheri Eichen & Bill Steinkellner	November 6, 1986	28.8 / 41 / #3
Norm is excited about a new business venture: Tan 'n' Wash, a combination laundromat and tanning salon. Despite Norm's misgivings about doing business with friends, the gang invests in the project. Due to a heavy snowfall, the business does well. However, the rooftop of Tan 'n' Wash collapses from the snow, and the business lacks insurance, causing the venture to fail. Diane dates Chad, but breaks up with him because Sam is jealous.
102	7	"Young Dr. Weinstein"	James Burrows	Phoef Sutton	November 13, 1986	29.8 / 43 / #3
Diane has a reservation with Jordan (Josh Clark) at the Café, telling Sam that the restaurant treats walk-ins and non-celebrities poorly. When Sam cannot get a reservation, he impersonates Jordan on the phone, canceling Diane's reservation. Frasier prepares Sam to go to the restaurant as Julian Weinstein (Frasier's former classmate) with one of Sam's dates. At closing time, Sam discovers that Jordan has left Diane without dinner; still posing as Weinstein, he orders the restaurant to let Diane eat dinner at his table. Sam does not have enough cash to pay for dinner, but Diane refuses to contribute. His real name is on his credit card (revealing his deception), so he runs off. Woody attempts to invent a new cocktail; he spends all day inventing one new drink but forgets the recipe.
103	8	"Knights of the Scimitar"	James Burrows	Jeff Abugov	November 20, 1986	26.9 / 40 / #5
Cliff, a new member of "the Knights of the Scimitar," invites Norm to join. Reluctant at first, he joins after learning that the club may be good for networking. At the meeting, when Norm is about to offer his accounting services, the High Sultan (Stephen Vinovich) tells him that offering services to other members is forbidden. Norm remains a member until the club passes a rule banning beer from its meetings, prompting him to quit. Diane is interested in Lance Apollonaire (J. Eddie Peck), a student in a class where she is a substitute teacher's assistant, but when Sam kisses her, she is more exhilarated than she was from Lance's kiss.
104	9	"Thanksgiving Orphans"	James Burrows	Cheri Eichen & Bill Steinkellner	November 27, 1986	21.7 / 38 / #6
It is Thanksgiving week; Cliff's mother is doing volunteer work, Norm is unhappy to see his mother-in-law, and lonely Frasier wants some company. Carla invites them to her house for a potluck while her children stay at ex-husband Nick and his wife Loretta's house. Norm's wife Vera and Sam's date are invited, but Sam's date decides to hang out with her sister, who just arrived, and Vera goes to her mother's. An uninvited Diane appears, telling them she ran away from the house of one of her professors when she realized she had not been invited as a guest, but as a server. The gang are ready for dinner, but Diane tells them to wait for the turkey. Unfortunately, Norm's turkey is thawing slowly and the other food is cold. Carla and Norm spew insults at and blame each other. They begin throwing food at each other, and the others follow suit. After the food fight, the gang calms down and decides to eat what they can, including the cooked turkey. When Vera unexpectedly arrives, Diane accidentally hits her with a pie she threw at Sam, causing her to angrily leave with Norm.
105	10	"Everyone Imitates Art"	James Burrows	Heide Perlman	December 4, 1986	28.4 / 42 / #3
A literary magazine rejects Diane's work, publishing Sam's poem instead. Suspecting his poem was plagiarized, Diane jeopardizes her health to track it down. Sam admits the plagiarism to Diane, showing her one of her letters to Sam as the source. Although she is pleasantly surprised that Sam saved her letters, he denies that he still has feelings for her. Carla makes her annual pilgrimage to Graceland, while her children visit Nick and Loretta.
106	11	"The Book of Samuel"	James Burrows	Phoef Sutton	December 11, 1986	28.2 / 42/ #3
Sam announces his fishing trip with his buddies at Moose River. Irritated by Diane and Carla's competition for the management job, he puts Woody in charge. When Woody's ex-girlfriend Beth (Amanda Wyss) comes in with her fiancé Leonard (John Brace), Diane says Woody has a girlfriend, prompting a double dinner date. Woody uses Sam's legendary black book to find a date, and Desirée (Katherine McGrath) is chosen as Sam's "best". However, Desirée looks older than expected and is uninterested in Woody, and Carla confirms her as Sam's "best" housekeeper. After dinner at Melville's, Woody reluctantly admits that seeing Beth and Leonard together saddens him. Beth tells Woody she wants to settle down, but he is the adventurous type. After Beth and Leonard leave, Desirée overhears the men (except Woody) ridicule her. Woody stops Desirée from leaving, telling her he had fun despite the evening's rough start. To make up, they go out for coffee.
107	12	"Dance, Diane, Dance"	James Burrows	Jeff Abugov	December 18, 1986	28.4 / 43 / #3
Diane is taking a ballet class. While Diane is out, Madame's assistant Leeza (Marilyn Lightstone) gives the gang Madame's negative opinion on Diane's video audition and the video itself. Rather than disappoint Diane, Frasier forges a more positive review. Diane sees the positive analysis, and sends the video to the Boston Ballet. Receiving no response, she attempts to audition there. Sam and Frasier arrive to tell her the truth, dashing her ballet dreams.
108	13	"Chambers vs. Malone"	James Burrows	David Angell	January 8, 1987	28.2 / 41 / #3
Diane insists that Sam is going to propose to her that day. Sam laughs her off, but near midnight, he actually breaks down and proposes, only to have her say no. Sam is furious and chases her out of the bar. Diane presses assault and battery charges. In court, after the judge (Tom Troupe) waives bail and sets the trial for the following day, Diane—with a neck brace and cane—tells the judge about their relationship and admits that she tripped and fell while Sam was chasing her. Sam's attorney Tom (Tom Babson) suggests that Sam propose to Diane again, and the judge agrees. Sam proposes twice in court; Diane says "okay" to keep him out of jail. After the case is dismissed, Diane takes off the brace and tells Sam she won't hold him to the proposal. Sam holds her to her answer and they become engaged.
109	14	"Diamond Sam"	James Burrows	Tom Reeder	January 15, 1987	30.3 / 43 / #3
Sam agrees to buy Diane a $5,200 engagement ring, but ends up buying an identical, $1,200 knock-off from a shady friend of Norm's. Sam later feels guilty and purchases the original ring. When Diane finds out about the deception, she throws the ring out of the car window, not realizing Sam had switched it back. Meanwhile, Carla does not take Sam and Diane's engagement well.
110	15	"Spellbound"	James Burrows	Kimberly Hill	January 22, 1987	30.7 / 42 / #5
Loretta leaves her husband Nick and refuses to go back to him. Diane asks Sam to hire Loretta as a singer. Convinced that Sam has his eye on Loretta, Nick tries to take Diane away from Sam by presenting her dinner, cake, and music at night, but she resists him as she had been. Loretta enters and assumes everything Nick prepared is for her until she sees the name "Diane" on the cake, prompting Loretta to walk out. Diane tells Nick to leave the bar and then chase after Loretta, leaving Sam and Diane to use the remains of Nick's dinner schemes. Meanwhile, Woody consistently beats Frasier at chess, much to his frustration.
111	16	"Never Love a Goalie"	James Burrows	Ken Levine & David Isaacs	January 29, 1987	30.3 / 43 / #3
112	17	"Never Love a Goalie"	James Burrows	Ken Levine & David Isaacs	February 5, 1987	27.7 / 40 / #3
Part 1: Carla begins a relationship with Eddie LeBec (Jay Thomas), a goalie from Quebec playing for the Boston Bruins. She brings Frasier to a game, since he is mourning the loss of Bombo (a lab chimpanzee). Carla is pleased by Eddie's play, but Frasier is detained by a security guard for assaulting a man. In the next game, however, Eddie loses to the Philadelphia Flyers. Diane is appointed jury foreperson in an attempted-murder case. Part 2: After her boyfriend Eddie (Jay Thomas) loses nine straight games, Carla decides that their relationship triggered his losing streak and breaks up with him. When he wins a game, they begin breaking up before the game and reconciling afterwards. Diane tries to persuade the jury to convict Bill Grand (Brent Spiner) for the attempted murder of his wife, Sherry (Suzanne Collins). However, Sherry drops the charges. Diane sees Bill and Sherry arguing at Cheers; Diane's prodding causes Sherry to becoming suspicious and angrily storm out. Jay Thomas reprises his character Eddie LeBec in later seasons.
113	18	"One Last Fling"	James Burrows	Cheri Eichen & Bill Steinkellner	February 12, 1987	27.4 / 41 / #3
In the cold open, Woody tells Frasier a tiresome story about how he broke his thumb. Diane jumps out of the cake at Sam's bachelor party after he talks sarcastically about abandoning bachelorhood for a one-woman commitment, angrily throwing cake in his face and leaving. The next day, she gives him an ultimatum: 24 hours to hook up with a woman, while she can do the same with another man. Instead, he spends the night in his car watching her apartment and waiting for her to come home; Diane watches him. The next day, with five minutes left, they plan to make love. Woody Harrelson's real-life arm injury was incorporated into his character Woody Boyd's arm injury. Woody Harrelson broke his arm when his car flipped during a practice for the Pro-Celebrity preliminary of the Toyota Grand Prix in 1987, which is why he is wearing a cast. Boyd's arm cast is seen again in later episodes of the season, and his arm injury is mentioned again in the next episode, "Dog Bites Cliff".
114	19	"Dog Bites Cliff"	James Burrows	Joanne Pagliaro	February 18, 1987	19.6 / 28 / #13
After a dog bites him, Cliff files a lawsuit against its owner. He then he meets the owner, Madeline Keith (Anita Morris), and is attracted to her. At a hotel, she tricks Cliff into signing a waiver-of-liability form and ends their relationship, citing a (nonexistent) husband. This episode aired at 9pm on Wednesday, February 18, 1987, instead of its regular time slot the following day, where Family Ties aired a one-hour episode at 8:30-9:30pm.
115	20	"Dinner at Eight-ish"	James Burrows	Phoef Sutton	February 26, 1987	27.9 / 40 / #4
Frasier and Lilith have moved in together and invite Sam and Diane to dinner. Diane accidentally reveals her past engagement to Frasier, upsetting Lilith. When the story is explained, Sam suggests forgetting the past and celebrating the present. All is well until Sam meets one of his ex-girlfriends and Diane reveals that she and Frasier had lived together. When the women storm into the bathroom, the men lock the door. When Cliff babysits Carla's children, they tie him up and drop him off at Cheers.
116	21	"Simon Says"	James Burrows	Peter Casey & David Lee	March 5, 1987	29.6 / 43 / #3
Frasier's friend Simon Finch-Royce (John Cleese), a British marriage counselor, has a pessimistic view of Sam and Diane's relationship; telling them any marriage would be short-lived, he suggests they break up. When they object, they go to Simon's hotel room to argue. After their several visits, annoyed Simon tells Sam and Diane what they want to hear, so they stop bothering him.
117	22	"The Godfather, Part III"	James Burrows	Chris Cluess & Stuart Kreisman	March 19, 1987	26.3 / 39 / #3
The late Coach Ernie Pantusso's brother asks Sam in writing to look after his daughter, Joyce (Cady McClain) from Reedsport, Oregon, who is attending Boston University. Sam and Diane ask Woody to give Joyce a tour of Boston; Woody and Joyce begin a relationship. At first, Joyce plans to marry Woody and drop out of college. However, Sam and Diane convince her to think about the effect on her family, so Joyce decides to stay in school, maintaining her relationship with Woody. Frasier thinks Lilith will give him golf clubs for their first-date anniversary, but he gets a tie instead. Due to President Ronald Reagan's live presidential news conference at 8pm ET, this episode aired at 9:30pm ET / 8:30pm CT in the East Coast. In the West Coast, it aired at 9pm (PT) / 8pm (MT), followed by the Cheers rerun. This episode is not to be confused with the actual film of the same name, which was released three years later (1990).
118	23	"Norm's First Hurrah" "Norman's First Hurrah"	Thomas Lofaro	Andy Cowan & David S. Williger	March 26, 1987	27.4 / 41 / #3
Norm works at one of Boston's top accounting firms, but his small office doubles as a supply room, and his boss (Neil Zevnik) takes him for granted and favors Norm's yuppie office mate Warren Thompkins (Tegan West). Diane arrives and then, when Norm refers to himself as "nothing", criticizes him for "sit[ting] around," "giv[ing] up so easily," and not achieving anything notoriously. Taking Diane's critique to heart, Norm brings a presentation to work; when Thompkins steals it and presents it as his own, the board of directors reject it for its negative economic impact. With Thompkins as the lightning rod, Norm is relieved to keep his job and decides not to be a "go-getter" but rather a "bench warmer". After Sam and Diane disagree on other locations, Sam chooses Walt Disney World for the planned honeymoon trip, and Diane reluctantly agrees.
119	24	"Cheers: The Motion Picture"	Tim Berry	Phoef Sutton	April 2, 1987	27.9 / 43 / #4
Convinced that life in Boston is corrupting Woody, his parents want him back in Indiana. To convince them to change their minds, the gang make a film about their lives. In the first viewing, they are horrified by the scenes: Sam and Woody's threats to kill a puppy, Carla's obnoxious children, Cliff's incompetence as a mailman, Norm's binge eating, and a suicide jumper seen out of Frasier's office window. Diane transforms the film into a Godardesque montage of scenes from other films. Woody's parents, unimpressed, still want him back until bar regular Al (Al Rosen) sends a note: "Let your son choose his own path, and it will always lead back to you".
120	25	"A House Is Not a Home"	James Burrows	Phoef Sutton	April 30, 1987	26.0 / 42 / #3
Sam and Diane buy a house from an elderly couple, Bert and Lillian Miller (Douglas Seale and Billie Bird), who had lived there for 40 years. Moved by their memories, Diane invites them and their family for a last Christmas party (in May). At the party, when Diane promises them more parties at the house, Sam angrily tells them it is now his and Diane's, and they must party somewhere else, astonishing Diane.
121	26	"I Do, Adieu"	James Burrows	Glen Charles & Les Charles	May 7, 1987	28.4 / 45 / #1
Sumner Sloane (Michael McGuire), who jilted Diane in the series pilot, tells Diane that a colleague was impressed with one of Diane's unfinished manuscripts. Although his colleague sent it to a publisher, Sumner warns her that, if she marries Sam, she will not have enough time to finish the manuscript. The next day, the publishers notify her that they like the manuscript so far but want it completed. Sam persuades Diane to cancel the wedding and finish the novel. At closing time, she promises Sam she will return in six months and leaves the bar (leaving Boston forever, not returning until the series finale).

Specials

No.	Title	Original release date
S03	"Pregame segment of the 1986 World Series, Game 3"	October 21, 1986
In an interview at the Cheers bar, NBC sportscaster Bob Costas asks Sam questions about how well Sam would pitch to New York Mets catcher Gary Carter. The bar gang contrarily responds to Sam's answers by indicating that Carter would perfectly catch Sam's pitches. Diane, entering the scene, gives Costas a compliment by saying that he is preferable to "Bert Fusberger" (a parodical name for CBS sportscaster Brent Musburger). When the interview ends, Carla gives Costas a note containing her phone number. At the stadium telecast, Costas's co-sportscaster Marv Albert takes the note away.

== Production ==
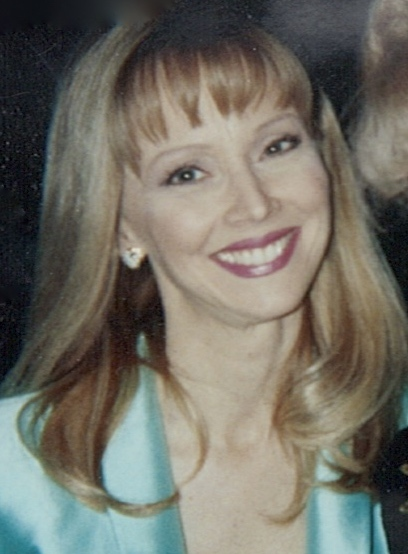
Shelley Long (pictured in 1996) decided to leave her role as Diane Chambers when the fifth season ends.

In January 1986, Shelley Long, who portrayed waitress Diane Chambers, announced her plans to leave the series when her contract would end, shortly before the beginning of the start of the sixth season. In December, she decided to leave her role as Diane to concentrate on her film career and family, while Ted Danson signed a contract for the next season (1987–1988) as Sam Malone. Rather than have them marry, the producers decided to separate Sam and Diane in the season finale and permanently end their romance. With Long's departure, the producers decided to find a female-lead replacement with a different appearance from Long's. They would also change Sam's character to one which was "more carefree" and "more of a goof-off", exploring his bachelorhood.

Three endings were filmed for the season finale, "I Do, Adieu", because it was possible that Long might decide to stay: 1) Sam and Diane become married; 2) Diane accepts an offer to finish a novel; 3) not revealed by the producers. The alternate ending in which Sam and Diane get married aired on May 27, 1998, as part of a 90-minute Fox special produced by the Paley Center called Behind the Laughs: The Untold Stories of Television's Favorite Comedies: A Museum of Television and Radio Special.

== Reception ==
The series regularly aired on Thursdays at 9 pm ET (8 pm CT). As of April 22, 1987 Cheers was in third place, with an average 27.2 rating (23.8 million households) and an average 41 share. As of October 1, 1986, revenue from each commercial break was $230,000.

At the time of the original broadcast, Kathy Carlisle of the Los Angeles Times felt that Sam and Diane should have been married at the end of the season. On the other hand, Monica Collins of USA Today called Diane a friendless, "snitty, selfish snob" and was relieved to see her leave the series.

Jeffrey Robinson of DVD Talk later found this season a great improvement over the previous season and "highly recommended" its DVD set, rated its content four-and-a-half stars out of five and its replay value four out of five. Robinson found Woody Boyd improved over the previous season, and Diane's departure poorly-written but "sad". Adam Arseneau of DVD Verdict graded this season 96 percent and the acting 95. He found the humor well-aged, and praised Frasier and Lilith's storyline. Arseneau called Sam and Diane "slightly silly" this season, but found Diane's departure "heartbreaking". He rated "Cheers: the Motion Picture" and "Dinner at Eight-ish" his all-time favorite episodes of the series.

Nate Meyers of Digitally Obsessed! graded this season's style "A−" and substance an "A", for memorable moments such as the season-finale wedding. He praised Lilith's appearances, finding her "poorly handled" since she appeared in only two episodes this season. He praised the humor as well-aged, not topical (apart from references to then-President Ronald Reagan and the Soviet Union) and "rarely forced". TV Guide ranked "Thanksgiving Orphans" number seven on its "100 Greatest Episodes of All Time" list. The A.V. Club highlighted its food fighting scene as one of notorious moments of the episode. IGN called "Thanksgiving Orphans" the fourth best Cheers episode and topped the season finale "I Do, Adieu" in the list. The Guardian's television critic Stephen Kelly panned the writing of "Chambers vs. Malone", which Kelly considered "one of the worst episodes."

== Accolades ==
In 1987, John Cleese won an Emmy as Outstanding Guest Performer in a Comedy Series for playing Simon Finch-Royce in "Simon Says" (1987). Michael Ballin, Bob Douglass, Doug Gray and Thomas J. Huth received Emmys for Outstanding Sound Mixing for a Comedy Series for the season premiere, "The Proposal" (1986).

== DVD release ==
The season is available on DVD in a four-disc box set. Like the prior season's DVD release, the set lacks special features such as outtakes and commentary.

Cheers: The Complete Fifth Season
Set Details
26 episodes; 4-disc set; 1:33:1 aspect ratio; English – Stereo; Closed captioning (Region 1); Subtitles: Danish, Dutch, English, Norwegian, Spanish (Region 2)
Release Dates
Region 1	Region 2	Region 4
May 17, 2005	November 27, 2006	January 11, 2007

== Notes ==
=== References ===
- Bjorklund, Dennis A (September 2014) [First published in 1993 as print edition]. Cheers TV Show: A Comprehensive Reference (e-Book ed.). Praetorian Publishing. ISBN 9780967985237.

=== First-run ratings notes ===
According to the 15 May 1987 article from The Argus-Press, the 1986-87 ratings were based on 87.4 million households with at least one television set. Unless otherwise, the sources were of the newspaper Pittsburgh Post-Gazette.
