= Home Is the Sailor (Cheers) =

- Cheers episode
- Episode no.: Season 6 Episode 1
- Directed by: James Burrows
- Written by: Glen Charles; Les Charles
- Original air date: September 24, 1987
- Running time: 24:44 minutes

Guest appearances
- Jay Thomas as Eddie Lebec; Jonathan Stark as Wayne, the bartender

Episode chronology
← Previous "I Do, Adieu"	Next → ""I" on Sports"
- Cheers (season 6)

"Home Is the Sailor" is the sixth-season premiere of the American television sitcom Cheers. It originally aired on September 24, 1987, on NBC. It is also the first episode including the fictional character Rebecca Howe, portrayed by Kirstie Alley, as the permanent female lead. It follows "I Do, Adieu", which was Shelley Long's last of her regular appearances as the female lead, Diane Chambers, who also left Boston on the show.

== Plot ==
Six months after he sold the bar to a corporation, Sam returns only to see Cheers having catered to a more upscale clientele. Eddie LeBec turns up and is surprised when Carla Tortelli tells him she is pregnant (incorporated due to actress Rhea Perlman's real-life pregnancy). Sam Malone then returns to the bar after his attempt to sail around the world failed at the first hurdle when his sailboat ran ashore in the Caribbean. Though Cheers has new management, Woody Boyd and Carla are still employed at the bar, but they're now required to wear uniforms, much to their chagrin. Sam then also needs a job, but the bar already has two bartenders, Woody and a new employee, Wayne (Jonathan Stark). Diane Chambers' attempts at writing her novel are said to have failed, which led to her leaving Boston to write in Hollywood.

Sam then meets Rebecca Howe, who is the new manager of Cheers and almost immediately turned off by him based on the rumors of Sam's "sexual prowess". Rebecca uses Sam's former office as her own and, although it has been completely renovated, Sam is able to use Carla's tricks to overhear Rebecca talking to her boss Evan Drake, on whom she has a crush. Evan knows Sam as a baseball player and wants to hire him to be a bartender. Sam is then hired, but one of the two current bartenders must be sacked to make room for him. The bar regulars want Wayne to go, but Rebecca wants to fire Woody. A competition then ensues to see if Wayne actually knows how to make every drink known. If Wayne loses the bet, he agrees to leave, but if he wins the bet, then he gets Sam's now-damaged sailboat. The gang plays a prank to cause Wayne to lose over the then-fictional, made-up cocktail "Screaming Viking", so he walks out. The gang cannot handle the cocktail; when Rebecca goes into the office, they spit it out. Though she is wise to their game, Rebecca gives Sam his severance check and tells Sam to leave. Sam then promises nothing of the sort will occur again and is provisionally re-hired on the understanding that this is his last chance as Rebecca uses a baseball metaphor-pun about having two outs, two strikes and "no balls".

== Production ==
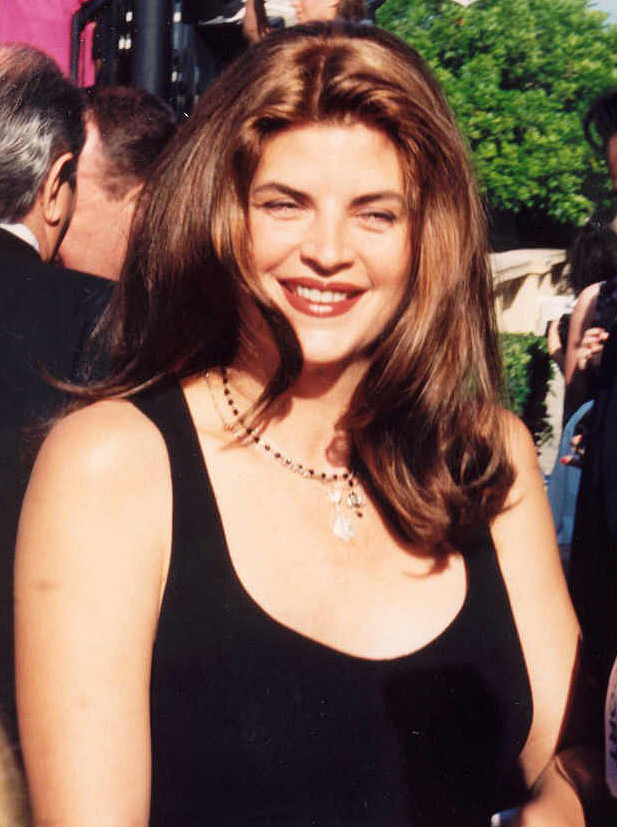
Kirstie Alley debuted as Rebecca Howe in this episode after Shelley Long left the series as Diane Chambers in 1987.

The producers intended Cheers to be a comedy about a comedy itself set in the Boston bar, but, as Burrows claimed, the "Sam and Diane" story arc predominated the show for five years and, as he hypothesized, would have made the bar more of a minor role and more irrelevant if Shelley Long had not left the show as Diane Chambers in 1987. With Diane written out in "I Do, Adieu" and Long departing the series, the producers planned to revamp the show's format without losing the bar, which has been their choice of intent, and then was relieved that the series would survive without Shelley Long. As Les Charles observed, Sam was a "straight man" to Diane; with Diane gone, they made him more "carefree" and a "goof-off."

In seeking a new female lead, James Burrows told People magazine that "we thought of the part as a martinet, a bitch. Then we met [Alley] and there was this vulnerability, so we made her the neurotic woman of the 1980s." When Long decided to leave the show, the creators knew they wanted a new female lead who was unknown to television viewers, would not have blonde hair and resemble Long. Kirstie Alley was one of the first actresses to audition for the role of Rebecca Howe. Although she met all the criteria, the producers continued to audition actresses, but none improved on Alley's portrayal of the character. Following which brunette-haired Alley debuted as Rebecca Howe.

Al Rosen, Michael Tulin, Tim Cunningham, Steve Giannelli, and Alan Koss are credited for their appearances.

== Reception ==
"Home Is the Sailor" scored a 28.4 rating and was third placed in the list of top ten shows that were tuned-in by households on the week of September 21–27, 1987. This episode earned its writers Glen and Les Charles an Emmy Award nomination for an Outstanding Writing in a Comedy Series in 1988 but did not win. In 1997, it was ranked No. 45 on TV Guide's 100 Greatest Episodes of All Time. In 2014, IGN ranked it as number two of the top ten Cheers episodes. In 2019, Joseph J. and Kate Darowski in their book Cheers: A Cultural History rated the episode all four stars.

== Screaming Viking ==
"Screaming Viking", a fictional made-up cocktail seen in this episode, became an actual cocktail. According to a recipe book The Boston Chef's Table, this cocktail is sold in the Cheers Beacon Hill, the pub the show was modeled after. The recipe book itself also provides ingredients of this cocktail: "orange-infused rum, dark rum, amaretto, cranberry juice, and pineapple juice". Colleen Graham from About.com provides different ingredients for the "Screaming Viking" cocktail recipe: "vodka, dry vermouth, lime juice, celery stalk, and [garnished] cucumber spear". Food & Wine magazine offers different ingredients for the cocktail recipe: seedless cucumber, "garnish[ed]" cucumber slice, mint leaves, gin, and tonic water.
