= Tim Cunningham (disambiguation) =

Tim Cunningham is an American actor.

Tim Cunningham may also refer to:

- Tim Cunningham (Shortland Street), a fictional character of soap opera Shortland Street
- Tim Cunningham, writer of the film The Big I Am
- Tim Cunningham (British actor), actor from the film Small Time
