= Showdown (Cheers) =

- Cheers episodes
- Episode nos.: Season 1 Episodes 21/22
- Directed by: James Burrows
- Written by: Glen and Les Charles
- Original air dates: March 24, 1983 (Part 1); March 31, 1983 (Part 2)
- Running time: Each Part: 30 minutes with commercials

Episode chronology
← Previous "Someone Single, Someone Blue"	Next → "Power Play"
- Cheers (season 1)

"Showdown" is the two-part first-season finale of the American television sitcom Cheers, written by Glen and Les Charles and directed by James Burrows. It originally aired on NBC (as separate Parts One and Two, respectively) on March 24 and 31, 1983. In the Cheers pilot, college-educated Diane Chambers was neglected by her previous lover and then hired as a waitress by bartender Sam Malone. Since then, they flirted and resisted each other throughout the season. In this two-part episode Sam's more-successful brother Derek becomes Diane's love interest, leaving Diane torn between Derek and Sam. In the end, Sam and Diane passionately embrace in the office.

The original airings initially scored low Nielsen ratings, but subsequent airings have enjoyed improved ratings. Its reruns aired three days before the show won five Emmy Awards out of thirteen nominations (including Outstanding Directing for a Comedy Series for this episode) in the 1983 Primetime Emmy Awards, and one week before the second-season premiere. Critical highlights of this episode are an unseen appearance by Derek Malone and Sam and Diane's cliffhanger kiss.

== Plot ==
=== Part one ===
Bartender Sam Malone has been jealous of his brother Derek, who is more successful, better-educated, multi-talented and handsome, for years, and discovers that he is arriving in Boston on his private jet. Meanwhile, co-bartender Coach is offered a coaching job in Venezuela requiring fluency in Spanish. Derek arrives unexpectedly at the bar and entertains the patrons with his talents, which include singing, playing a pool table, tap dancing and telling stories. Derek offers a job to regular patron Norm, teaches Coach Spanish (increasing his chances of being hired) and impresses waitress Diane with their common interests. Diane and Derek pair off (which bothers Sam). During his date with Debbie (Deborah Shelton), Sam hears Derek's private jet, where he carries Diane along.

=== Part two ===
A week later, Norm is fired from his own job (where the corporation has committed tax fraud) for "[taking] a long lunch". (Norm dubs himself the only "honest man" in the corporation, which he considers the reason for his termination.) Coach hears on the phone that he did not get the coaching job (which was already given to someone else), putting his efforts to learn Spanish to waste. Sam forgets another fiancée Cindy's (Peggy Kubena) name. Diane arrives at the bar after her trip with Derek, confessing to Coach that she is torn between her ideal mate Derek (who is committed to her) and her "bubblegum" Sam. Coach insists that Sam cannot express his feelings for her well. When Diane tells Sam she and Derek will be leaving immediately on another trip, Sam fires her.

After saying goodbye to everyone in the bar, Diane returns to the office and accidentally hits Sam's nose when she opens the door. Because of that, she is convinced that Sam was coming out of the office to say something to her. They argue, admit their feelings for each other, and come into the terms that their relationship with Derek is nothing compared to their potential relationship together. Sam and Diane embrace, but then Diane rejects his advances, i.e. attempts to kiss her. They insult each other and, at the end, kiss passionately.

== Production ==
The two-part season finale was written by Glen and Les Charles and directed by James Burrows. Before it aired, the NBC network announced that it renewed Cheers for a second season on March 13, 1983. The show was filmed at the Stage 25 lot of Paramount Studios in Los Angeles, rather than at a local pub. Paul Vaughn and Alan Koss are credited for their background appearances in both parts. Lois de Banzie and Helen Page Camp portray Carla's customers, who annoy her by randomly changing their orders until they choose "two boilermakers: Wild Turkey [whiskey] and Bud [beer]".

== Ratings ==
Part One of the episode originally aired on NBC at 9:30 pm on March 24, 1983, opposite CBS's Simon & Simon and ABC's It Takes Two. It was rated 51st out of 67 nationally broadcast programs, with a 13.6 Nielsen rating. In Alaska, it aired on April 7 at 8:30 pm AKT. It reran September 15, 1983 in the same time slot (opposite CBS's rerun of Simon & Simon and an ABC football game), and was rated 28th of 66 nationally broadcast programs with a 15.9 rating and a 25 share.

Part Two originally aired on March 31, 1983 at 9:30 pm, opposite CBS's Simon & Simon and ABC's It Takes Two; it was rated 36th of 69 programs, with a 14.7 rating. In Alaska, it aired on April 14 at 8:30 pm AKT. It reran in the same time slot September 22, 1983 opposite CBS's rerun of Simon & Simon and the two-hour premiere of ABC's Trauma Center, a week before the second-season premiere ("Power Play") and three days before the Primetime Emmy Awards. The episode was rated 23rd of 57 programs, with a 15.7 rating and a 24 share.

== Reception ==
In September 1983, television critic Rick Sherwood found the "sibling rivalry" plot "nothing new", but praised it as "fresh" and sophisticated. Part One of this episode earned graphic designers James Castle and Brucy Bryant an award for Outstanding Individual Achievement of Graphic Design and Title Sequences at the 1983 Primetime Emmy Awards. At the same ceremony, Part Two of the episode earned James Burrows an Emmy for Outstanding Directing for a Comedy Series. Burrows and his crew also won the Directors Guild of America Award for Outstanding Directing for a Comedy Series in 1984.

Freelance writer Robert David Sullivan in his 2012 blog post ranked Part Two of this episode No. 96 of his top 100 all-time favorite episodes. Sullivan highlighted the cliffhanger kiss as a "landmark" in the increasing sitcom use of cliffhangers, but dismissed the sibling storyline as a cheap ploy to bring Sam and Diane together. Lisa M. Dresner in her 2007 book The Female Investigator in Literature, Film, and Popular Culture also considered unseen character Derek Malone a writer's tool to bring the couple together. David Hofstede in his 2006 directory 5000 Episodes and No Commercials called Sam and Diane's first kiss at the end as one of Cheers' greatest moments. February 2012 reviews of the season finale on The A.V. Club website were positive. Noel Murray praised the episode's four-act structure (two in each part) and its subplots. Ryan McGee cited the concealed appearance of Derek Malone, Sam and Diane's first kiss and their volatile confrontation. TV Guide and Amy Amatangelo of MSN Entertainment in, respectively, 2005 and 2013 called Sam and Diane's first kiss one of their own top-ten kisses. Alan Howell of WhatCulture! in April 2013 ranked Sam and Diane's first kiss third on his list of "[Five] Greatest Sitcom Kisses Of All Time".

In 2009, TV Guide ranked "Showdown" #29 on its list of the 100 Greatest Episodes. Joseph J. and Kate Darowski in their 2019 book rated Part 1 three out of four stars and Part 2 all four mainly for the Sam-and-Diane moment. In June 2019, Vox critic Emily St. James noted that Part 2's ending inspired onscreen romances and an increase of cliffhangers in later sitcoms.

== In popular culture ==
Alan Sepinwall of The Star-Ledger said that, in an episode from the third season of How I Met Your Mother, "Everything Must Go", the taxicab ride scene of regular character Barney Stinson (Neil Patrick Harris) and recurring character Abby (Britney Spears) features a homage to Sam and Diane's office scene from this episode, which includes lines, like "Are you as turned-on right now as I am?" and "More!"
