= Sam Malone =

Fictional character in the series Cheers

- Cheers character
- Sam flirting with a woman in "Behind Every Great Man" (episode 63, 1985)
- First appearance: Cheers: "Give Me a Ring Sometime" (1982)
- Last appearance: Frasier: "The Show Where Sam Shows Up" (1995)
- Created by: Glen and Les Charles
- Portrayed by: Ted Danson

In-universe information
- Gender: Male
- Occupation: Owner/Bartender
- Family: Derek Malone (brother)
- Spouses: Debra (divorced)
- Nationality: American

Samuel "Mayday" Malone is a fictional character and the protagonist of the American television show Cheers, portrayed by Ted Danson and created by Glen and Les Charles. Sam is a former relief pitcher for the Boston Red Sox baseball team who owns and tends the bar called "Cheers". He is also a recovering alcoholic and a notorious womanizer. Although his celebrity status was short-lived, Sam retains that standing within the confines of Cheers, where he is beloved by the regular patrons. Along with Carla Tortelli and Norm Peterson, he is one of only three characters to appear in all episodes of Cheers. Sam has an on-again, off-again relationship with the bar waitress Diane Chambers (Shelley Long) for the series' first five seasons until her departure from the series. Then he tries to seduce Diane's replacement, Rebecca Howe (Kirstie Alley), who frequently rejects his advances. Sam also appears in "The Show Where Sam Shows Up", a crossover episode of the spin-off Frasier.

Other actors auditioned for the role. Producers decided to give Danson the role primarily for his chemistry with Shelley Long as Diane. Critical reception for the character has been mostly positive. Some academics considered Sam an example of satirizing masculinity. For his performance as Sam, Ted Danson won two respective Emmy Awards as an Outstanding Lead Actor in a Comedy Series in 1990 and 1993 and two Golden Globe Awards as a Best Actor in a Musical or Comedy Series.

== Role ==
At the time the series debuted in 1982, Sam has been the bartender and owner of Cheers for five years. (Note: "Give Me a Ring Sometime." Cheers: Season 1: The Complete First Season on DVD. Paramount, 2003. DVD.) (Note: "Sam at Eleven." 1982. Cheers: Season 1: The Complete First Season on DVD. Writ. Glen Charles and Les Charles. Paramount, 2003. DVD.) Chronologically within the series, Sam, who is Irish Catholic, dropped out of high school in his senior year to play professional baseball. (Note: "Teacher's Pet". 1985. Cheers: Season 3: The Complete Third Season on DVD. Paramount, 2004. DVD.) He has one older brother, Derek, who seems to be a polymath and is a highly successful international lawyer. Derek and Sam are not close, and Sam is also not close to his parents (who it is implied, always favored Derek).

Sam began his career in the minor leagues, where he met Coach Ernie Pantusso (Nicholas Colasanto). He eventually became a relief pitcher for the Boston Red Sox, wearing number 16. His major league career lasted approximately five years; he specifically mentions having pitched in 1973, and was a member of the 1975 AL champion Red Sox team. In 1977, he became the owner of Cheers. Although his baseball career is not highly detailed throughout the series, Sam was at times a good-to-very-good pitcher (stories of him retiring star batters occur during the series) and was the team's bullpen ace for a while. Sam's baseball career declined when he became an alcoholic, and there are also numerous stories of him pitching poorly and giving up tape-measure home runs. Over time, Sam's role as a bartender turns him into the "resident ringleader for an assortment of poor souls and wanna-be's".

Throughout the series, Sam has had casual female partners, usually one-dimensional or sexually very available, and sometimes takes them along in his red Chevrolet Corvette. But, not all his advances are successful. Sam is often rejected or humbled or even humiliated. However, in "Sam Turns the Other Cheek" (episode 49, 1984), Sam reveals that he avoids "married, underage, and comatose" women, so he does have some ethical standards. Sam is very kind-hearted and always stands by his friends. In "Teacher's Pet" (season 3, 1985), Sam earns his high school diploma despite an overall bad grade from the high school geography teacher, with whom he had a brief affair while he was her student. The episode "Sam's Women" (episode 2, 1982) reveals that Sam was married to his somewhat more sophisticated ex-wife, Debra (Donna McKechnie). (In some syndicated prints, Sam's past marriage is omitted, although it is mentioned again in the 5th-season episode, "Young Dr. Weinstein".)

Notably, he has an on-and-off relationship with "a bright, attractive graduate student", Diane Chambers (Shelley Long). One time after Sam and Diane ended their on-and-off relationship, in "Rebound, Part One" (episode 45, 1984), Sam relapses into alcoholism and excessively womanizes. Diane finds this out from Coach, and involves her new love interest Frasier Crane (Kelsey Grammer) in helping Sam slowly regain his sobriety in the following episode, "Rebound, Part Two". In the three-part episode "Strange Bedfellows" (episodes 93–95, 1986), Sam dates an intelligent, attractive politician Janet Eldridge (Kate Mulgrew), who eventually ends the relationship because of Sam's visible feelings for Diane. Throughout the fifth season (1986–87), Sam cyclically proposes to Diane, but she rejects every proposal until, in "Chambers vs. Malone" (episode 108, 1987), Diane finally accepts his latest proposal. In "I Do, Adieu" (episode 121, 1987), Sam and Diane try to marry but call off the wedding to let her start a supposedly promising writing career.

In the following episode "Home Is the Sailor" (episode 122, 1987), Sam sells Cheers to the Lillian Corporation six months before the episode and later returns to the bar to work under employment of the "voluptuously beautiful" new manager, Rebecca Howe. Within this period, Sam constantly flirts with and attempts to seduce Rebecca, but she rejects all of his advances. In "Cry Harder" (episode 194, 1990), Sam is able to buy back the bar from the Lillian Corporation after Sam has saved the corporation from financial victimization by Robin Colcord (Roger Rees), Rebecca's lover. At the last minute, Sam and Rebecca embrace and make love. However, in the following episode "Love Is a Really, Really, Perfectly Okay Thing" (episode 195, 1990), Sam devastatingly tells Rebecca that he has no feelings for her.

In "The Days of Wine and Neuroses" (1990), Sam rejects Rebecca's advances one night while she is drunk over her doubts when now-impoverished Robin proposed to her. In the tenth season (1991–92), they try to conceive a child, but by then, they have decided to stay friends. In "The Guy Can't Help It" (1993), Sam plays with the idea of marrying Rebecca (as a safety net "in case no one better comes along"), but several bar patrons and even Carla tell Sam his womanizing is getting him nowhere, prompting him to join Dr. Robert Sutton's (Gilbert Lewis) group meetings for sex addicts, a referral made by Frasier.

In the series finale, "One for the Road" (1993), Sam reunites with Diane after six years of separation. They try to rekindle their relationship, but just before they fly off together to California, Sam and Diane begin to have doubts about their future together, and they re-separate. Sam returns to the bar, where his friends celebrate his return. Then, when Norm and Sam remain while everyone else leaves, Norm reassures Sam that Sam would return and never leave his one "true love"—which the TV Guide implies is the Cheers bar.

In a Frasier episode, "The Show Where Sam Shows Up" (1995), Sam is engaged to Sheila (Téa Leoni), a fellow sex addict whom he met during group therapy, but he breaks off the engagement after she admits that she slept with two regular Cheers customers—Paul Krapence and Cliff Clavin—during their engagement. Unbeknownst to Sam, she slept with Frasier, which she does not reveal to Sam.

=== Skit appearances ===
Ted Danson reprised the role of Sam Malone in pre-game segments of the 1983 Super Bowl and of one of the baseball games of the 1986 World Series, The Magical World of Disney episode "Mickey's 60th Birthday", and The Simpsons episode "Fear of Flying". In the Super Bowl pregame skit, Sam and his customers at the bar chide Diane for not knowing and ridiculing football. They meet Pete Axthelm, an NBC sportscaster who visits the bar. (Note: Super Bowl XVII Pregame. NBC. January 30, 1983. Television.) In the pregame skit of the 1986 World Series game, Bob Costas interviews Sam at the bar. In "Mickey's 60th Birthday", Sam forgets Rebecca's birthday and begs Mickey Mouse to sing "Happy Birthday to You" as her birthday present. Rebecca chooses Mickey over Sam, who still wants to seduce her. (Note: "Mickey's 60th Birthday". The Magical World of Disney. NBC. November 13, 1988. Television.) In The Simpsons, Sam is dating twins while trying to marry Diane without Rebecca knowing.

== Development ==
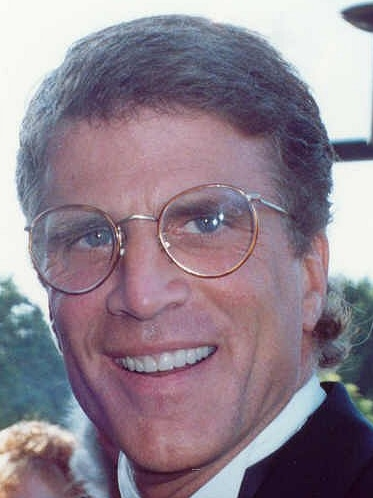
Ted Danson, portrayer of Sam Malone

=== Conception, writing, and casting ===
Before the series began in September 1982, various actors considered or were considered for the role of Sam Malone. Before he was cast, Ted Danson appeared in films and television series. Danson appeared in the 1979 film The Onion Field, adapted from the nonfiction book of the same name, as Officer Ian Campbell, who was murdered by two criminals. Danson also appeared in Taxi episode, "The Unkindest Cut" (1982), as one-time character Vincenzo Senaca—"a flamboyant and decidedly effeminate hairdresser, who ruined Elaine's locks [sic] but got his comeuppance at the end." Cheers creators Glen and Les Charles—along with James Burrows—were executive consultants for the episode. Danson, William Devane and Fred Dryer were shortlisted for the role of Sam Malone. Ed O'Neill auditioned for the role but did not win the part. John Lithgow missed the audition because he was ill.

Originally, Sam Malone was intended "to be a former wide receiver for the American football team, New England Patriots." Fred Dryer was initially chosen for that role because he is a former football player, but the Charles brothers chose Danson because NBC executives noticed the chemistry between him and Shelley Long. The character then evolved into a former relief pitcher for the baseball team Boston Red Sox. The character of Sam Malone was based on the baseball career and post-career sobriety of Cleveland pitcher Sam McDowell. To prepare for the role, Danson attended a bartending school in Burbank, California.

Fred Dryer later appeared as Dave Richards, one of Sam Malone's friends and a sports commentator, in Cheers. Danson said:

I had no idea how unintelligent [Sam] was. At first I thought he was making these—because Sam would come out with these things that were funny, and I thought, well, maybe he's being ironic. You know, maybe he's smart enough to know that he's saying stupid things in the beginning. I think it took me about a year and a half before ... I had an inkling on how to play Sam Malone, because he was a relief pitcher, which comes with a certain amount of arrogance. You know, you only get called in when you're in trouble and you're there to save the day, and that takes a special kind of arrogance, I think. And Sam Malone had that arrogance. And I, Ted Danson, did not. I was nervous, scared, excited about, you know, grateful about my new job.

— Ted Danson, NPR's "Fresh Air", September 17, 2009

Sam is "athletically handsome" and a womanizer who casually dates and has sex with various women "who want to have fun". However, his relationships invariably fail. Les Charles said that Sam was a "straight man" to Diane; after Shelley Long's departure, he became more "carefree" and a "goof-off."

Ted Danson wore a hairpiece to conceal his baldness for the role of Sam Malone during filming of Cheers. His baldness was revealed at the 42nd Primetime Emmy Awards (1990). In the episode "It's Lonely on the Top" (1993), Sam Malone reveals his baldness to Carla (Rhea Perlman).

Danson earned US$450,000 per episode as Sam Malone during the last few years of Cheers. In the final season of Cheers (1992–93), Danson decided to stop portraying Sam Malone, which contributed to the end of Cheers. Danson said about the way the character changed, "He got older, you know ... [the writers] tried to make him Sammy again. But he's 45 now. I'm 45. It's OK to be chasing around when you're 37. But when you're 45, it's kind of sad to be chasing around that way." The producers tried to continue the show without Ted Danson, and they attempted to move the show to the first-run syndication, but these ideas were shelved.

Some people think Cheers is 'Cheers'—the bar is the soul of the show. Other people think Cheers is Cheers plus Sam, and Sam is the soul. Because (Danson) had chicken pox, we had to do one show [sic] ["The Ghost and Mrs. LeBec" (1990)] without Sam, and it was a challenge. He's the one who's everyone's friend. He's the one who tells the truth. He's the one who takes care of everybody.

— Cheri Eichen, Los Angeles Daily News, November 1990

=== Characterization and analysis ===
Sam's on-screen relationships with Diane and Rebecca were inspired by works about the "mixture of romance and antagonism of two people, [portrayed by Spencer Tracy and Katharine Hepburn], in a competitive situation".

Sam is subject to a satire of masculinity. He is described as "a sleazy, promiscuous, aggressive, exhibitionistic narcissist", one of the "new macho [heroes]" of the 1980s pop culture, "the target of humor," and not a "likely [candidate] to lead the post-feminist counter revolution." A new macho hero of the 1980s is the opposite of a pre-1980s macho hero that "constituted an antifeminist backlash".

Steve Craig from the University of North Texas wrote in his 1993 journal that Sam is a parody of "traditional male values" and of a negative stereotype of masculinity. Craig wrote that Sam's attempts to define and exemplify "his version of masculinity" are satirized throughout the series "to explore gender identity" without threatening the viewer's own definition of one's own gender. In his 2011 book Primetime Propaganda, Ben Shapiro, an American conservative commentator, called Sam "a dog, a feminist caricature of men", and a cultural representation of the "lower-class conservative," in contrast to portrayer Ted Danson, who identifies himself as liberal. Glen Charles, a creator of Cheers, considered Sam "a spokesman for a large group of people who thought that [the women's movement] was a bunch of bull and look with disdain upon people who don't think it was".

Heather Hundley wrote that the series sends "double standards" about promiscuous men and women. Hundley said that Sam is portrayed as heroic. She further wrote that Sam never suffers from consequences of his promiscuity and has been happily single and childless, while it portrays Carla Tortelli as a "nymphomaniac" who regrets her own promiscuities, which lead to out-of-wedlock pregnancies. She said the series' portrayal of premarital sex is "negative and unhealthy", omitting other dangers of promiscuity such as sexually transmitted diseases and HIV/AIDS. Mark LaFlamme of the Sun Journal called Sam's relationship with Rebecca Howe "mundane" and his flirtation with her "bawdy".

Throughout most of Cheers, Sam is "allowed to be happy [and to live] a rich life". Towards the end of the series' run, however, Sam undergoes therapy for sex addiction. In a 1995 episode of Frasier called "The Show Where Sam Shows Up", Sam is depicted as a self-identified sexual addict; he gets help from group meetings and commits to changing himself.

Sam Malone has been compared with some of Ted Danson's later roles. In 1998, David Bianculli from New York Daily News called Danson's guest appearance as a plumber in Veronica's Closet Sam Malone's "close cousin: a confident womanizer, and not the brightest guy in the room". In 1999, Danson said that Sam Malone and John Becker (Becker) are both "very lonely men".

== First-run reception ==
Ted's a true leading man [...] If there's any kind of ripple in the chemistry of the show, he'll address it personally. He doesn't just read his lines and go back home.

— —John Ratzenberger, actor

Woody Harrelson, who played Woody Boyd, called Sam the person who brings an ensemble together. Roger Rees, who portrayed Robin Colcord in Cheers, said that no other character could fill in Sam Malone's spot if he was written out of the show. Rees also said that the show would not survive without Sam and Danson. Television critic Phil Rosenthal from Los Angeles Daily News said Danson's performance as Sam was irreplaceable and that no other actor could capture Sam's "sexiness, vulnerability, and goofiness". Rosenthal credited Sam Malone for helping the series survive by becoming the show's central character.

According to the April 1–4, 1993, telephone survey of 1,011 people by the Times Mirror Center for the People and the Press (now Pew Research Center), (Note: The margin of error in the survey was ±3, according to the polls.) Sam Malone was a top favorite character by 26%. The survey asked which character Sam should marry. 21% voted Diane Chambers, 19% voted Rebecca Howe, 48% voted Sam to stay single, and 12% had "no opinion" on this matter. When asked which character should star in a spin-off, 15% voted Sam, 12% voted Woody Boyd (Woody Harrelson), 10% voted Norm Peterson (George Wendt), and 29% voted no spin-offs. Frasier Crane (Kelsey Grammer), whose own spin-off Frasier debuted in September 1993, was voted by 2% to have his own show.

According to a 1993 article in People magazine, newspaper columnist Mike Royko chose Diane to be with Sam. Novelist Jackie Collins picked Rebecca. Celebrated personality Zsa Zsa Gabor chose both as Sam's potential partner. Tennis player Martina Navratilova found Sam too good for either of them. Novelist-archaeologist Clive Cussler said Carla Tortelli (Rhea Perlman) was "Sam's best bet."

Sam's appearance in Frasier received mixed notices. Scott D. Pierce from The Deseret News found him too "old and [tiring]." Nevertheless, John Martin, a syndicate writer from The New York Times, enjoyed Sam's interaction with main characters of Frasier. Frazier Moore from The Associated Press called Sam's appearance a ratings ploy but a must-see for a Cheers fan and any other viewer who lacks interest in the show Frasier.

== Retrospective reception ==
Bill Simmons writing for ESPN praised Danson's performance for giving life and color to Sam Malone. In The Complete Idiot's Guide book, John Steve and Carey Rossi said Sam Malone "[brings] magic to establishment" and is praised for "successfully running [Cheers]." The Shark Guys website ranked Sam at number three on its list of the "top ten coolest bartenders of all time". In a 2009 NPR interview, Terry Gross called Sam "the opposite of intellectual".

In a January 2023 episode of an NPR radio talk show Pop Culture Happy Hour, a radio listener calling remarked how Sam's "relentless predatory behavior toward his female coworkers" in "a show about sexual harassment in the workplace" would disturb today's contemporary viewers. In response, a cohost Linda Holmes said, despite the series's "hard" portrayal of Sam and Diane as a "mutual" relationship:

Sam is, in a bunch of different ways, a completely inappropriate person. He's an inappropriate boss. He's also inappropriate to women who come into the bar. He hits on every woman who comes into the bar. He is a very bad example of how you would want an actual person to behave.

Another cohost Aisha Harris also described him as "a vapid horndog" in the series "about people who, for the most part, are pretty terrible". However, Holmes and Harris further said that Sam has some depths, layers, and feelings, like other characters of the series.

== Accolades ==
The role of Sam Malone earned Ted Danson two Emmy Awards as the Outstanding Lead Actor in a Comedy Series: one in 1990 and another in 1993. It also earned Danson two Golden Globe Awards as the Best Actor in a Musical or Comedy Series: one in 1990 and another in 1991. Danson was awarded an American Comedy Award as the Funniest Male Performer in a TV Series.
