= I Do, Adieu =

- Cheers episode
- Episode no.: Season 5 Episode 26
- Directed by: James Burrows
- Written by: Glen Charles; Les Charles
- Original air date: May 7, 1987
- Running time: 25 minutes (excluding commercials)

Guest appearance
- Michael McGuire as Sumner Sloane

Episode chronology
← Previous "A House Is Not a Home"	Next → "Home Is the Sailor"
- Cheers (season 5)

"I Do, Adieu" is the fifth-season finale of the American television sitcom Cheers, written by Glen and Les Charles and directed by James Burrows. It aired on May 7, 1987, on NBC. During the fifth season, Sam Malone repeatedly proposes to Diane Chambers, and she refuses repeatedly until she accepts engagement in "Chambers vs. Malone" (1987). In the previous episode, "A House Is Not a Home", Sam and Diane bought a house together. Before this episode aired, Ted Danson decided to renew his contract with the show as Sam Malone, while Shelley Long decided to quit the series, which could conclude the on-and-off romance of "Sam and Diane" that went on for the first five years since 1982.

In this episode, Diane is offered an opportunity to finish one of her novels. However, she must choose between her talents and her man, Sam. After she becomes persuaded into honing her talents, Diane leaves the job, the bar, the relationship, and the city behind for that. In the series finale in 1993, "One for the Road", Long makes her special guest appearance as Diane Chambers and the "Sam and Diane" story line therefore is resurfaced. Meanwhile, with Long's departure, producers of the series made plans to reconstruct the show by introducing a new female lead who does not resemble Long.

== Plot ==
Sumner Sloane (Michael McGuire), Diane's ex-fiancé who jilted her in the series pilot, surprisingly returns to Cheers. Alone in the billiard room, Sumner tells Diane that he submitted one of her unfinished manuscripts against her will to one of his colleagues, who praised it and sent it to publishers, exciting her. However, Sumner warns her that she would not spend enough time finishing the novel if she marries Sam. Unbeknownst to them, Sam overhears this conversation.

At home, in the house they bought together in the previous episode, "A House Is Not a Home", Sam wants to postpone the wedding, but Diane suggests that they be married immediately. Alone for a moment, Sam daydreams about their own elderly selves living in what would have been if Diane chooses Sam over her career. In that fantasy, Sam and Diane are happily married elderly couple with children and grandchildren. Moreover, Diane has not finished her novel but assures Sam that she has no regrets and that abandoning her talents does not affect their marriage and her happiness with him. Back into reality, then they decide to set the wedding at the bar, where people know about their relationship.

The following day, at the official wedding, a phone call, picked up by Woody, announces that Diane's unfinished novel was praised by publishers and, if finished, will likely be published. Unaffected Diane still wants to marry, but Sam convinces her to set her writing talents first before marriage. Convinced to hone and cherish her writing skills, Diane decides to give writing career a chance, putting a wedding to an end. At closing time, Sam and Diane alone embrace each other for the last time together. Diane promises him that she will return to him in six months. Sam tells her to "have a good life", but Diane attests to her promise and leaves the bar. Now alone in the bar, Sam says in a monologue, "Have a good life", and then he fantasizes elderly versions of himself and Diane embracing and dancing.

== Production ==
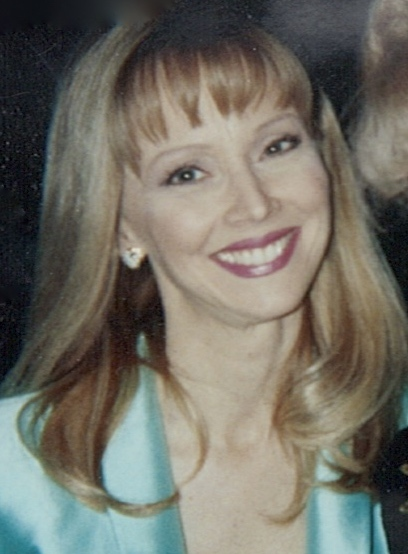
Shelley Long (pictured in 1996) makes her final regular appearance as Diane Chambers in this episode. She would appear in the series finale "One for the Road".

The producers intended Cheers to be a comedy about the bar itself, but, as Burrows claimed, the "Sam and Diane" romance predominated the show for five years and, as he hypothesized, would have made the bar more of a minor role and more irrelevant if Shelley Long had not left the show as Diane Chambers in this episode. With Long leaving the series, the producers made plans to revamp the show with the bar as a central setting, as originally intended, and credited Long for helping the series by departing it. After years of writing Sam as a "straight man", especially to Diane, the writers would transform Sam into becoming more "carefree" and a "goof-off" in season six. The creators, in February 1987, decided to find a female lead replacement whose hair is not blonde and who does not resemble Shelley Long. Brunette-haired Kirstie Alley debuted as Rebecca Howe in the next episode, "Home Is the Sailor" (1987).

Sam and Diane were the center of 'Cheers' as a partnership, and now the partnership is gone. There will be huge comparisons made.

— Ted Danson, The New York Times, September 23, 1987

This episode was written by Glen and Les Charles and directed by James Burrows. On December 15, 1986, Shelley Long decided to leave Cheers as the regular character Diane Chambers, even though she and Ted "[had] done some really terrific work at Cheers", for her movie career and family, while Ted Danson signed a contract for the next season (1987–1988), which led producers, the Charles brothers and Burrows, to separate Sam and Diane. An idea to keep Sam in and write Diane out without risk of ruining the quality and losing viewers had been developed. Before Diane was written out by having her leave Boston for a writing career, some ideas were attempted and discarded, like Sam and Diane's child in the next season, as Sam would have been a single father, and another ideal man for Diane. Three endings were filmed, in part to attempt to keep the actual one a secret, and because it was possible that Long might decide to stay: 1) Sam and Diane become married; 2) Diane accepts an offer to finish a novel; 3) not revealed by the producers. The alternate ending in which Sam and Diane get married aired on May 27, 1998, as part of a 90-minute Fox special produced by the Paley Center called Behind the Laughs: The Untold Stories of Television's Favorite Comedies: A Museum of Television and Radio Special.

Steve Giannelli is credited for his background appearance, and Walter Addison portrays the Justice of the Peace performing Sam and Diane's bar wedding.

== Reception ==
This episode originally aired on May 7, 1987, on NBC at 9:00pm (Eastern) / 8:00pm (Central) and scored a 28.4 rating and 45 share, was watched by 24.8 million homes, and ranked #1 in Nielsen ratings. After the episode originally aired, Kathy Carlisle of Los Angeles Times called this episode "hilarious, but somewhat contrived and very disappointing" and felt that Sam and Diane should have been married at the end. Monica Collins from USA Today called Diane a "snitty, selfish snob" and was relieved that the character left the series. According to Collins, she has not made friends with people in Cheers onscreen. More often, she has not befriended women, and she has "[teased] men more than [pleased] them".

Later reviews analyzed the departure of Diane Chambers and the end of her relationship with Sam Malone. In 2005, David Hofstede in the guide 5000 Episodes and No Commercials and Jeffrey Robinson of DVD Talk found Diane's departure poorly done. The following year, Gillian Flynn from Entertainment Weekly called Sam and Diane's breakup in this episode one of the "all-time best breakup scenes" in history. In 2010, Jane Boursaw from Huffington Post and Amy K. Bredemeyer from The Talking Box blog called the wedding of Sam and Diane one of their favorite "weddings that [did not] happen". The following year, UGO.com called Sam and Diane's breakup from this episode one of "the most horrible [television] breakups." In 2014, IGN placed it as number one of the top ten Cheers episodes. In 2019, Joseph J. and Kate Darowski in their book Cheers: A Cultural History rated the episode all four stars.
