= Sam and Diane =

Fictional couple in the show Cheers

Sam and Diane in "Any Friend of Diane's" (1982; season 1, episode 6)

Sam Malone and Diane Chambers, collectively known as Sam and Diane, are fictional characters in the American sitcom television series Cheers. Sam is a working-class, baseball player–turned–bartender played by Ted Danson; Diane is a college-graduate cocktail waitress played by Shelley Long. Danson appeared on Cheers for its entire run of the series; Long was part of the regular cast from the 1982 series premiere ("Give Me a Ring Sometime") until the fifth-season finale, "I Do, Adieu" (1987). Long returned for a special appearance in the 1993 series finale, "One for the Road."

During the first five seasons, Sam and Diane both flirt with and condemn each other as social opposites, repeatedly consummating their relationship and breaking up. When they are not together, Sam has affairs with many women; Diane has relationships with men fitting her upper-class aspirations, such as Frasier Crane (Kelsey Grammer), a long-running character who initially debuts in the third season as Diane's love interest in the romantic pair's dynamic. Each of the first four season finales ends with a cliffhanger involving the story arc. In "I Do, Adieu" (1987) Sam and Diane are due to marry, but they cancel the wedding when Diane leaves Sam and the bar to begin a career as a writer. In the series finale, Sam and Diane are reunited, become engaged and break up again, realizing that they are never meant to be together.

The pairing of Sam and Diane has evoked mixed reactions. Some critics disliked the relationship, either for alienating viewers by dominating the show (and removing its original premise) or because they saw Sam and Diane as a mismatch. Others praised the pair, seeing them as strengthening the show. Some writers compared them to couples in later shows, such as Moonlighting, with their sexual tension and intermittent relationships.

== Development ==
We tried all kinds of combinations. Casting is vital, especially in this show where there's sexual dynamics tension between the two main characters. That hasn't been tried in a sitcom before.

— Glen Charles, July 11, 1982

Before the series was produced, the creators auditioned three pairings of six actors, three male and three female, for their respective roles: William Devane and Lisa Eichhorn, Fred Dryer and Julia Duffy, and Ted Danson and Shelley Long. Originally, Sam Malone was "a former wide receiver for the New England Patriots [football team]", and Fred Dryer was initially considered for that role because he was a football player. However, NBC executives praised test scenes between Ted Danson and Shelley Long, so the creators chose this pairing. Sam's character was changed into a former relief pitcher for the Boston Red Sox baseball team.

The creators of Cheers, Glen and Les Charles and James Burrows, originally planned Sam and Diane to be an ex-athlete and an executive businesswoman involved in a "mixture of romance and antagonism" from screwball comedy movies starring Spencer Tracy and Katharine Hepburn for Sam and Diane, but they decided to modify the competitive aspect. The concept evolved into a "pretentious, college-student relationship with Sam," an ex-baseball player. After Shelley Long's departure from the show and replacement with Kirstie Alley as Rebecca Howe, the original concept was revisited. Heide Perlman said, "It wasn't quite Tracy–Hepburn, because she was a tight-ass, and he was a hound."

The creators had intended Cheers to be a comedy about "family" of characters in a Boston bar, but quickly realized that the "Sam and Diane" romance was popular and decided that every episode would depict it. Burrows told the others several weeks after filming began, "Sam & Diane – that's your show." The "Sam and Diane" romance dominated the show for five years. As Burrows hypothesized, the couple would have diminished the importance and relevance of the bar setting if Long had not left the show in 1987. While the writers were developing the sexual tension between the two characters in the first season, the Charles brothers recognized that the relationship had to mature, so they paired them up in the first-season finale. With the exceptions of Long's last regular episode "I Do, Adieu" (1987) and the series finale "One for the Road", every season finale that primarily focuses on Sam and Diane ends with a cliffhanger. With Long leaving Cheers, producers planned to revamp the show without losing its initial premise, and credited Long's departure for saving the series from cancellation. As Les Charles observed, Sam was a "straight man" to Diane; after Long's departure, he became more "carefree" and a "goof-off" in later seasons.

== Relationship ==
=== Season 1: 1982–1983 ===
Sam and Diane had nothing in common beyond a mutual physical attraction, which he spent the first season trying to exploit, while she kept him at bay with witty put-downs.

— Mike Boone from The Montreal Gazette, May 2, 1984

Shelley Long said in January 1983, "the core of the show is Sam and Diane ... the relationship has a wonderful chemistry, although they try to resist each other". She said that the producers felt that they did not want the relationship to proceed too quickly. The creators stated that Long and Danson "were easier to write for and had more potential than [other tested auditioning pairs]."

In the series premiere, "Give Me a Ring Sometime" (1982), Diane Chambers, a college student, enters Cheers and meets Sam Malone, a recovering alcoholic and a womanizer. While she waits for her fiancé Sumner Sloan (Michael McGuire), Diane realizes that Sumner has left her, and that she is jobless and penniless with nothing else in her life. Sam offers Diane a job as a cocktail waitress, and she accepts. In the next episode, "Sam's Women" (1982), Diane snootily teases Sam for preferring just beautiful women with below average intelligence. In response, Sam involves his ex-wife, Debra (Donna McKechnie), in a pretend relationship to prove Diane wrong. (In some syndicated prints, Sam's past marriage is omitted.) When Sam and Debra are leaving "for" an opera, Diane retrieves the opera pamphlet from Debra only to find it is two years old, foiling Sam's scheme. Sam blames Diane for making his romantic life less fun, and Diane assures that he would never win an intelligent woman. They argue but then make up. When Sam explains a color of the sky at a ski resort and compares it to Diane's eyes in vivid detail, apparently distracted Diane is nearly touched but then averts herself and treats it as repulsive to an intelligent woman.

Throughout the season, Sam and Diane are attracted to each other and trade each other flirts and innuendos, but they never consummate their relationship. In the two-part season finale, "Showdown" (1983), Diane briefly dates Sam's successful, handsome, well-educated brother Derek, making Sam jealous. No longer able to suppress their feelings, Sam and Diane kiss passionately in the bar's office.

=== Season 2: 1983–1984 ===
After they became a they, it wasn't as if all the problems had been solved. These are two very different characters, each with a spunk but as mismatched as baseball spikes and dress pumps.

— —Stuart D. Bykofsky from Knight-Ridder Newspapers, April 29, 1984

Throughout the second season of Cheers, Sam and Diane consummate their relationship, which becomes dysfunctional. Sam and Diane love each other but maintain their antagonistic relationship style toward each other. Their pride and jealousy are often the cause of conflict, and their characteristic bickering continues, though often their love for each other overcomes any problems, such as their on-off relationship. Major conflicts arise toward the end of the second season. Robert David Sullivan wrote in December 2012 that trying to change each other and hurting each other took its toll on their relationship. In "Fortune and Men's Weight" (1984), Diane admits to Sam that she spent a platonic evening with a fellow student who shares her common interests, and feels guilty for not telling Sam. In "Snow Job" (1984), Sam plans to have a weekend of debauchery with his friends on a ski trip, and he hides it from Diane. Carla tells Diane about Sam's trip and Diane takes advantage of Sam's lies to teach him a lesson.

In the two-part season finale, "I'll Be Seeing You" (1984), Philip Semenko (Christopher Lloyd), an arrogant, eccentric painter, whom Sam wants to commission for a portrait of Diane, comes to the bar. Sam strongly dislikes Semenko but Diane praises his talent and begs Sam to do the same, but Sam orders her not to sit for him. However, Diane is convinced that Sam will appreciate the final work despite his reaction to the artist, and has Semenko paint the portrait. Sam hires a lesser artist, who produces a botched portrait of Diane. When she takes the wrapped portrait by Semenko into the bar, Sam and Diane begin to argue until she despondently declares the relationship to have "always been a contest of wills" and then become denigrated into immaturity. Then Sam and Diane finally break up for good. At the cliffhanger, Sam unwraps Semenko's portrait and says "Wow!"

=== Season 3: 1984–1985 ===
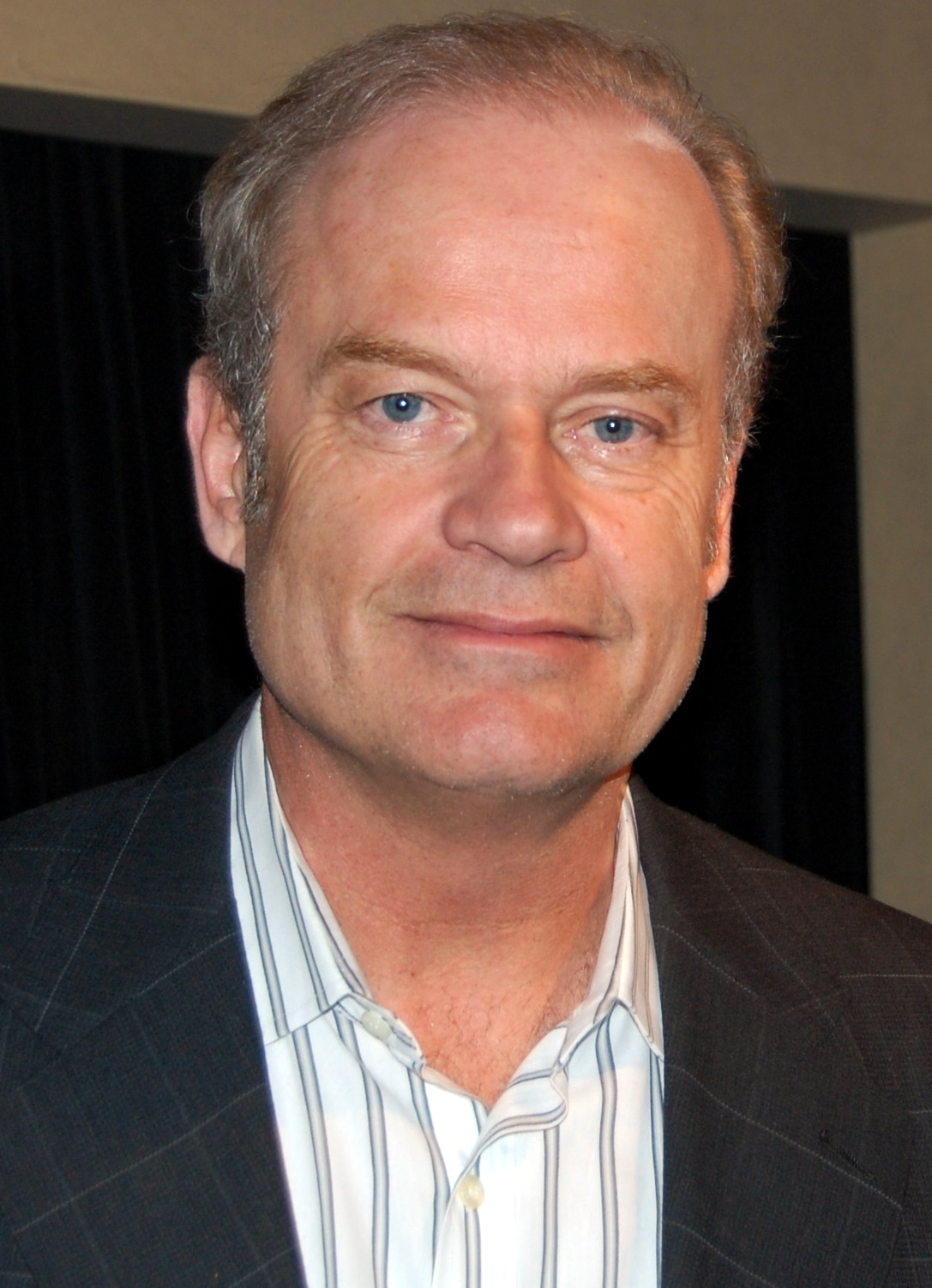
Kelsey Grammer debuted in Cheers as Diane Chambers's lover, Frasier Crane, and continued his role for 20 years in this show and his spin-off Frasier.

In summer 1984, before the third-season premiere, The show's producers announced the character Frasier Crane, portrayed by Kelsey Grammer, was to be Diane's love interest and Sam's intellectual rival. They intended for Diane to end her relationship with Frasier within a few episodes, and for him to leave the show, but Grammer's performance was well-received, so his role was extended for the whole season. Long was still married to stockbroker Bruce Tyson and was pregnant with his child, and a storyline involving Diane Chambers's out-of-wedlock pregnancy was speculated with either Sam or Frasier as the father. The producers deemed the pregnancy idea undesirable and abandoned it. Instead, Diane was written as childless.

In the two-part season premiere, "Rebound" (1984), within months after her breakup with Sam, Diane meets psychiatrist Frasier Crane in a psychiatric hospital and begins to date him. Meanwhile, spurred by the collapse of his romance with Diane, Sam relapses into alcoholism. When she leaves the hospital, Coach (Nicholas Colasanto) tells Diane about Sam's relapse. Diane and Frasier help Sam to regain his sobriety. When Diane refuses to work as a waitress again, Coach convinces Diane that Sam will relapse again, tells Sam that Diane will lose her mind if she leaves Cheers again, and convinces Frasier that Sam and Diane will long for each other if she does not return to work there. Diane returns to Cheers as a waitress.

In "Diane's Allergy" (1984), Diane moves into Frasier's apartment and becomes allergic, which she believes is caused by Frasier's puppy, Pavlov. Frasier gives Pavlov to Sam, who renames her "Diane". However, Diane suffers allergies, so the apartment is renovated to alleviate her suffering. Later, Frasier regrets giving up the puppy and begs Sam to return her; Sam declares that he loves "Diane", which Diane interprets his as a confession of his love for her. In "A Ditch in Time" (1984), Diane admits to him that she told people in the ward about their relationship, including his failed attempt to go on a ski trip with his "buddies in debauchery" in "Snow Job" and watching football right after his lovemaking with Diane for the very first time. Hearing them, Sam apologizes and admits that he failed to be a "very good boyfriend", but tells her that he never "tried harder with any woman in [his] life" and that the good times with her were some of the best of his life. Then Diane stops him from saying something "stupid", i.e. his almost love confession to her.

Later in "Cheerio, Cheers" (1985), Sam is told of Diane's plans to leave Boston with Frasier for London. At night in the bar, Sam and Diane try to have sex after their passionate embrace, but realize that they are not sure what else to do in their future together. Before she leaves, Sam advises her to call him if she wants to revive their relationship again. Diane arrives in London with Frasier and then calls Sam at the bar to tell him. Despite her obvious misgivings about her relationship with Frasier, and Sam's pain at her choice, Diane stays in Europe with Frasier. She contacts Sam in two episodes before the season finale "Rescue Me" (1985), in which Frasier proposes to Diane in Italy; she accepts and tells Sam about it by telephone. Suddenly, Sam daydreams of stopping the wedding. Back in reality, Carla assures Sam that he is still a womanizer, regardless of his feelings about Diane. With the help of Cliff Clavin's (John Ratzenberger) travel reservation, Sam goes to Italy to stop Diane from marrying Frasier. Diane tries to call Sam but hears part of his answering machine message, and then hangs up. Frasier and Diane are set to be married immediately.

=== Season 4: 1985–1986 ===
In the season premiere, "Birth, Death, Love, and Rice" (1985), Sam arrives too late to stop Diane and Frasier's wedding. Several months later, Sam discovers that Diane had abandoned Frasier at the altar and feeling guilty for her promiscuity, joins a convent. Sam rescues her and gives her back her job at Cheers. Throughout the season, Sam and Diane try to simply be friends again, fighting their attraction to each other.

In "The Triangle" (1986), Sam and Diane feel bad about Frasier's deterioration, so they plan to help him regain his self-confidence by making Sam feign symptoms. Frasier concludes that Sam is still in love with Diane and advises him to tell her. For Frasier's sake, Sam and Diane try to be in love but begin arguing again, and Sam furiously tells Frasier that he and Diane faked their love for each other to help Frasier sober up and boost his self-esteem. Frasier angrily tells Sam and Diane that they still love each other but deny and loathe their feelings. He declares himself not to be part of their love triangle and walks away. In the three-part season finale "Strange Bedfellows" (1986), Sam dates an intellectual politician, Janet Eldridge (Kate Mulgrew), whom Diane opposes politically. When Sam and Janet start and then continue dating, Diane accuses Janet of using Sam for political purposes, not loving him, and planning to dump him. However, after the election is over, Janet and Sam are still together, much to Diane's dismay. One night in the bar, Diane overhears Janet ask Sam to fire Diane, but Diane resigns the next day. At Janet's press conference in the bar, Diane questions Sam and Janet's future together, resulting in a conflict between Sam and Diane, which humiliates Janet. Finally, Janet breaks up with Sam because she feels that he is still in love with Diane. At the end of the final installment, Sam dials the telephone and proposes marriage to the call's unknown recipient.

=== Season 5: 1986–1987 ===
Sam and Diane were the center of 'Cheers' as a partnership, and now the partnership is gone. There will be huge comparisons made.

— Ted Danson on Shelley Long's departure,
The New York Times, September 23, 1987

In the season premiere "The Proposal" (1986), the unseen character is revealed to be Diane Chambers. Although she is thrilled, Diane tells Sam that a proposal by telephone is not how she envisioned getting engaged. Sam agrees and invites her for a night of romance on a yacht, where he proposes again. Diane rejects him, thinking that Sam is proposing on the rebound from Janet. Diane wants to marry Sam, but Sam is furious with her for turning him down. Regardless, Diane returns to work at the bar and waits for Sam to propose again. Meanwhile, they continue dating other people. In "Chambers vs. Malone" (1987), after Sam proposes again and Diane rejects him, Sam chases Diane up the street, causing her to fall and injure herself. Diane charges Sam with assault, leading to a trial. In the courtroom, at the judge's behest, Sam proposes to Diane again, and she finally accepts. In "A House Is Not a Home", Sam and Diane buy a house together.

In the season finale "I Do, Adieu" (1987), Diane's ex-fiancé, Sumner Sloan, who dumped her in the series pilot, returns to Cheers and tells Diane that he sent one of her unfinished manuscripts to his colleague, who praised it and gave it to the publishers. Although Diane is excited, Sumner warns her that simultaneously being married and having a career is impossible, and that choosing marriage over career would put her talents to waste. Later, Sam and Diane want to be married immediately at the bar. At the wedding, Diane receives a telephone call informing her that the publisher wants her work, but she must finish it immediately. Although she wants to be married to Sam, he convinces Diane to finish the book and delay the wedding, so that she has no regrets about giving up her dream of being a great writer. In their last scene together, Diane tells Sam that she will return to him in six months, but Sam doubts it. She leaves Boston behind to pursue her writing career.

Long decided to leave the series to develop her movie career and family, and the characters' relationship story was concluded, even though she and Danson "[had] done some really terrific work at Cheers". In February 1987, the creators decided to replace Diane with a female lead without blonde hair or any other resemblances to Long, while Danson signed a contract for the next season (1987–1988).

=== Series finale: 1993 ===
I don't think we ever entertained that idea of Sam and Diane going off together. It seemed like [we'd be] going backwards a little. I'm not sure if that big of a portion of our audience would have been happy with it[.] [T]here were people who loved Shelley, but a lot of people liked Rebecca better, or thought Diane was bad for Sam, and so on.

— Les Charles, GQ

Very occasional references were made to Diane in the years following her departure; it was established that she had abandoned her novel and was trying to break into writing for television. In the series finale, "One for the Road," after six years of separation, Sam watches Diane win an award for writing a cable television movie and sends her a congratulatory telegram. Diane accepts Sam's invitation on the telephone.

The following day, Sam and Diane reunite at last. Diane confesses to Sam that after leaving Boston in 1987, she spent her time in Los Angeles transforming her manuscript into a screenplay, and she did not want to return to Cheers as a failure, thus further prolonging her stay there. They both admit that despite their good times, they are never meant to be together because they are total opposites. As Diane prepares to leave Boston again, Sam stops her and begs her to have sex with him for old times' sake.

The next day, they are engaged again and then plan to move to Los Angeles together. However, as the airplane is leaving Boston, they have doubts about their relationship with help of rhetorical questions from announcers. Their flight is delayed, so Sam and Diane end their relationship once more after their many years apart. Sam returns to Boston and Diane returns to Los Angeles.

== First-run reception ==
James Burrows: The three of us have been with Sam and Diane a long time, and we're a little tired of their shenanigans. Les Charles: A little bored and amazed America was so passionate about them.

— The New York Times, September 23, 1987

Some contemporaneous reviews of the Sam and Diane relationship were mixed. In May 1984, Mike Boone of the Montreal Gazette wrote that when Sam and Diane's relationship was consummated, their sexual tension evaporated; their relationship dominated the series, alienating viewers and critics and "diminish[ing] the appeal of Cheers". Although the show won the Emmy Award in 1984 for Outstanding Comedy Series, because the show was seen as dominated by Sam and Diane during its second season (1983–1984), Fred Rothenberg of the Associated Press wrote in September 1984 that Cheers did not deserve an award. According to Ron Weiskind of the Pittsburgh Post-Gazette, the series suffered after Sam and Diane became lovers. Weiskind wrote in 1987 that the relationship "ran out of steam long ago", and was relieved when Long's departure ended it.

In October 1984 television critic Rick Sherwood wrote that although the sexual tension between Sam and Diane provided a focus for Cheers' other characters, their later romance and "the removal of the love-hate subplot [caused] much of the edge of the series [to be] lost". In October 1985, Sherwood's interest in the show lessened because of the romance; Diane's affair with Frasier Crane "made things worse". According to Howard Rosenberg of the Los Angeles Times in 1986, Glenn Caron (executive producer of Moonlighting) said: " ... I think it's masochistic to take two people who seem destined for each other and ask an audience not to see them get together". In 1989, Michael Hill of The Baltimore Evening Sun found the similarity between the Cheers characters and real-life news anchors Sam Donaldson and Diane Sawyer of Primetime Live "remarkable".

Fred Rothenberg of the Associated Press (in October 1983) and Diana E. Lundin of the Los Angeles Daily News (in 1991) considered Sam and Diane the next Rhoda (Valerie Harper) and Joe (David Groh)—of the 1970s television show Rhoda—with respect to the decline of the show after their marriage and divorce. In the "Youth Beat" column of the western Pennsylvania Observer–Reporter in 1992, Jeremy Ross called Sam and Diane "the most-discussed [romantic characters] since Romeo and Juliet" and the model for later television romances.

In April 1993 there was media debate about whether Sam should be with Diane or her replacement, Rebecca Howe (Kirstie Alley). According to an April 1–4, 1993 telephone survey of 1,011 people by the Times Mirror Center for the People and the Press (now the Pew Research Center), Sam Malone was the favorite character of 26 percent of respondents and Diane Chambers the favorite of four percent. Asked whom Sam should marry, 21 percent favored Diane, 19 percent favored Rebecca, 48 percent favored neither and 12 percent had no opinion. According to a May 1993 People magazine article, newspaper columnist Mike Royko chose Diane to be with Sam, novelist Jackie Collins picked Rebecca, Zsa Zsa Gabor chose both for Sam, tennis player Martina Navratilova thought Sam too good for either of them, and novelist and archaeologist Clive Cussler saw Carla Tortelli (Rhea Perlman) as "Sam's best bet." That month, George Wendt (who played Norm Peterson) told the Los Angeles Times that "the first two or three years" of the Sam-and-Diane story arc were his favorite Cheers seasons.

Some Sacramento bar patrons were dissatisfied with the series' finale, and thought that Sam and Diane should have been together at the end. Bret Watson of Entertainment Weekly wrote in 1994 that Sam's flirtation with Diane in Cheers might be considered sexual harassment by contemporary standards.

== Retrospective reception ==
=== 2000s ===
In February 2002 Bill Simmons, a former writer for ESPN, appreciated Sam and Diane's sexual tension but called their engagement a "jumping the shark" moment. In November 2002 Mathew Gilbert of The Boston Globe called Sam and Diane one of "TV's classic couples." They were 50th on Bravo's 100 Greatest TV Characters 2004 list, and in February 2007 Sam and Diane were number one on IGN's Top 10 Favorite TV Couples list. Cynthia Greenwood wrote in her 2008 book The Complete Idiot's Guide to Shakespeare's Plays that Sam and Diane's relationship was comparable to that of Beatrice and Benedick in Much Ado About Nothing, filled with tension and insults concealing their feelings for each other.

In May 2007, The Huffington Post writer Julia Ward called their relationship one of a number of "inevitable, yet doomed romances." MSN writer Jessica Piha in 2000s listed the pair as one of "TV's top couples". In 2009, Josh Bell of About.com called Sam and Diane "the template for countless future sitcom couples [filled] with sexual tension". In March 2009 Dave & Dave of WQED-TV wrote, "The whole Sam-Dianne [sic] thing got in the way of a lot of humor but the sight [of] George [sic] and Cliffy sitting at the bar makes me laugh every time." At the September 2009 Comic-Con, Johnny Galecki of The Big Bang Theory exemplified a "non-traditional relationship" with Sam and Diane and said that "not all couples meet, get together, and marry."

Critics on The A.V. Club have reviewed the relationship, with Noel Murray calling them one of "[Ten] TV Romances for the Ages" in February 2006. In September 2009, critics considered Sam and Diane's relationship fun to watch; it did not spoil Cheers, since the show's genius lay in the writers' freedom to risk alienating the audience.

=== 2010s ===
On January 28, 2011 a critic wrote on CraveOnline, "The ill-fated love affair of a prissy barmaid and a retired, egomaniacal relief pitcher made an art out of teasing a love story ... ", ranking Cheers one of the "Best TV Romance Shows". In the March 2, 2011 issue of the Chicago Sun Times, Walter Podrazik wrote that both characters were the focus of Cheers. However, since Shelley Long departed from the series in 1987, Podrazik observed that the series changed its focus into an ensemble. On March 11, 2011, Beth Brindle of HowStuffWorks called their relationship "completely unrealistic".

[T]here is a similarity in the Sam and Diane relationship to the relationship of our parents. Our mother was prim and proper, a voracious reader [...] Our father liked to hang out at the bar and watch sports. I don't think he ever read a book.

— Les Charles in the October 2012 GQ

Steve Silverman wrote on the Screen Junkies website in January 2012 that Diane was "too needy and insecure for anyone [like Sam] to have a legitimate relationship with." In February 2012, Kevin Fitzpatrick of UGO Entertainment placed them second on a list of "the Most Absolutely Awful TV Couples". In the May 4, 2012 Medford, Oregon Mail Tribune, Robert Galvin criticized the relationship's lack of "common sense". On May 30, 2012, Amber Humphrey wrote on the Film School Rejects website that the unresolved sexual tension between Flash Forward characters Tucker (Ben Foster) and Becca (Jewel Staite) was comparable to that between Sam and Diane. In April 2013, Josh Robertson called Diane a "total drag" and "almost impossible to [be] in a sexual situation" on the complex.com website. Robertson considered Diane's replacement, Rebecca Howe, "way more attractive than Diane" and cited Sam and Rebecca as one of "The 25 Most Sexual Sitcom Couples of All Time".

In January 2010, Sharon Knolle of AOL placed them fourth on a top 10 "Worst TV Couples Ever" list: "When Diane showed up on the series finale and nearly got back together with Sam, we were honestly relieved when they both realized [a marriage between them] would be a terrible mistake." However, on February 10, 2010 David Hofstede ranked their kisses seventh on the website's "10 Best Smooches in Television". Two days later, Oliver Miller wanted the couple to be together but found their breakups heartbreaking (including the final breakup in the series finale). In April 2010, Jane Boursaw called Sam and Diane's wedding one of her favorite "weddings that didn't happen". In January 2011, TV Guide writer Shaun Harrison listed Sam and Diane as one of "the Best TV Couples of All Time".

In April 2012, The A.V. Club noted Sam's "insecurities" about his intelligence and Diane's enthusiasm about "pretentious creative types." The 2012 Entertainment Weekly article called Ross (David Schwimmer) and Rachel (Jennifer Aniston) of Friends the "modern-day Sam and Diane". The 2016 Vulture.com article said that Ross and Rachel are "the better couple" than Sam and Diane. Other people have compared Sam and Diane to other television couples, like the titular characters of Ned and Stacey, whose relationship counters the "delayed romance strategy", portrayed respectively by Thomas Haden Church and Debra Messing; Chelsea (Laura Prepon) and Rick (Jake McDorman) of Are You There, Chelsea?; and Sonny (Demi Lovato) and Chad (Sterling Knight) of Sonny with a Chance.

Screen Rant critic Simone Torn in 2019 viewed "Sam's violent threats toward Diane" and slap fights between Sam and Diane as two of ten things that make Cheers "aged poorly".

=== 2020s ===
Vox television critic Emily St. John personally thought that none of onscreen television pairings in later years have come as close to Sam and Diane, despite the couples' own happy endings. However, St. John further wrote that the spark between the pair "was never as strong as it was in those first two seasons" of the series.

In a 2023 episode of an NPR radio talk show Pop Culture Happy Hour, a cohost Linda Holmes said that, despite the series's hard portrayal of the couple's "mutual" relationship, Sam's "inappropriate behavior" and especially flirtations toward women would not sit well with today's contemporary audience.

== In popular culture ==
In the novel When Angels Fail to Fly, a female character compares the sexual tension between Sam and Diane to that between David and Maddie of Moonlighting, and the first-person narrator mentions Sam and Diane's arguments "about something stupid". In an episode of Community, Sam and Diane are satirized. Alan Sepinwall of The Star-Ledger said that, from the season three episode of How I Met Your Mother, "Everything Must Go", the taxicab ride scene of regular character Barney Stinson (Neil Patrick Harris) and recurring character Abby (Britney Spears) includes a homage to the Sam and Diane's office scene from "Showdown", which includes lines, like "Are you as turned on right now as I am?" and "More!" In Guardians of the Galaxy Vol. 2, Peter Quill (Chris Pratt) compares his relationship with Gamora (Zoe Saldaña) to the relationship of Sam and Diane while dancing to Sam Cooke's "Bring It On Home to Me". In Crazy Ex-Girlfriend episode “I Hope Josh Comes to My Party!”, Rebecca Bunch says of her relationship with Greg Serrano that they have a “Sam and Diane thing going on, except that it’s unpleasant and unsexy.”

== Bibliography ==
- Bierly, Mandi; Fog, Henning (May 8, 2012). "32 Best 'Will They/Won't They?' TV Couples". Entertainment Weekly. Archived from the original on May 11, 2012.
- Carter, Bill (May 9, 1993). "TELEVISION; Why 'Cheers' Proved So Intoxicating". The New York Times.
- Harmetz, Alijean (September 23, 1987). "Changes on tap at Cheers". The Ledger. Lakeland, Florida. p. 1C+.
- Meade, Peter (April 29, 1984). "We'll Cry In Our Beers As Sam, Diane Split". Spartanburg Herald-Journal. p. 14. Editions of April 27–29, 1984, are bundled in the webpage. Article is located at page 85 in Google.
