= Al Rosen (actor) =

American actor (1910–90)

- Rosen in Cheers
- Born: Albert Rosen; May 9, 1910; Baltimore, Maryland, U.S.
- Died: August 2, 1990 (aged 80); Hollywood, California, U.S.
- Occupation: Actor
- Years active: 1941–1990

Albert Rosen (May 9, 1910 – August 2, 1990) was an American actor. He was known for his recurring role of Al in the television sitcom Cheers.

== Biography ==
Rosen was born in Baltimore, Maryland. He acted in several films in the 1940s, then in the 1970s was a production supervisor on the TV show What's My Line?. Again in the 1980s, he acted in television series and films in minor roles, including the recurring character "Al" (or "Big Al") in the sitcom Cheers and the cafeteria concession stand attendant in the sitcom Night Court. He can be seen as an extra in the sitcom Taxi as a cabbie in the background.

According to Gilbert Gottfried's Amazing Colossal Podcast with James Burrows, airing on September 9, 2019, Al was also a stunt man for the Three Stooges.

== Death ==
He died of cancer in Hollywood, California on August 2, 1990, at the age of 80.

Season 9, episode 12 of Cheers ("Norm and Cliff's Excellent Adventure") is dedicated to Rosen with "to our friend Al Rosen" shown during the credits.

== Filmography ==
- Footlight Fever (1941)
- Uncivil War Birds (1946)
- Without Reservations (1946)
- Ain't Love Cuckoo? (1946)
- The Stratton Story (1949)
- What's My Line? (1941) (production manager)
- Oh, God! Book II (1980)
- L.A. Law (1988)
- Cheers (1983-1989) (74 episodes)
