= Tim Cunningham =

American actor and baseball coach

- Born: January 21, 1946 (age 80); Freeport, Illinois, U.S.
- Education: Marquette University
- Occupations: Actor, baseball coach
- Spouse: Pat Cunningham
- Children: 1

Tim Cunningham (born January 21, 1946) is an American actor and baseball coach. He is known for playing the recurring roles of Chuck and Tim in the American sitcom television series Cheers. He guest-starred in television programs including Beverly Hills, 90210, Remington Steele and Party of Five.

== Coaching ==
Cunningham was a baseball coach in the early 2000s. He replaced Mitch Miller and coached at Harvard-Westlake School.
