= Glen and Les Charles =

American brothers TV writer and producer duo

Glen Charles
- Born: Glen Gerald Charles; February 18, 1943 (age 83); Henderson, Nevada, U.S.
- Education: University of Redlands
- Occupations: Screenwriter and producer
- Known for: Cheers
- Awards: Primetime Emmy Award for Outstanding Writing for a Comedy Series and Writers Guild of America Award for Television: Episodic Comedy (Cheers episode "Give Me a Ring Sometime")

Les Charles
- Born: March 25, 1948 (age 78); Henderson, Nevada, U.S.
- Education: University of Redlands
- Occupations: Screenwriter, producer
- Known for: Cheers
- Awards: Primetime Emmy Award for Outstanding Writing for a Comedy Series and Writers Guild of America Award for Television: Episodic Comedy (Cheers episode "Give Me a Ring Sometime")

Brothers Glen Gerald Charles (born February 18, 1943) and Les Charles (born March 25, 1948) are American screenwriters and television producers, best known for working on Taxi and co-creating Cheers.

== Early lives and careers ==
The Charles brothers attended the University of Redlands. Glen graduated in 1965, and Les graduated in 1971. Glen began his professional life as an advertising copywriter but moved into television. They began their television careers together as writers for M*A*S*H in 1975; all their work throughout their entire TV and film career was done jointly. They later wrote for The Mary Tyler Moore Show, Phyllis and The Bob Newhart Show, and were head writers and producers on the TV series Taxi. They then formed the Charles-Burrows-Charles production company with James Burrows, and created and produced the television series Cheers, which ran from 1982 to 1993.

After Cheers ended, the brothers largely retired from the business. The screenplay for the 1999 film Pushing Tin became their final produced writing credit. They are credited in every episode of Frasier as the creators of the "Frasier Crane" character from Cheers, but had no other creative involvement in the original series or the revival.

== Cheers ==
Cheers is a sitcom that ran on NBC from September 30, 1982, to May 20, 1993, with a total of 275 half-hour episodes for eleven seasons. The show was produced by Charles/Burrows/Charles Productions in association with Paramount Network Television. The show is set in a bar named Cheers in Boston, Massachusetts, where a group of locals meet to drink, relax, and socialize. The Cheers finale aired on May 20, 1993, and was watched in an estimated 42.4 million households across the country.

== Filmography ==
=== Television ===
Writing credits
Series	Episode	Air date
M*A*S*H	"The Late Captain Pierce"	October 3, 1975
Doc	"Doc, Heal Thyself"	November 8, 1975
Phyllis	"Paging Dr. Lindstrom"	December 22, 1975
Phyllis	"Phyllis in Love"	January 19, 1976
Phyllis	"Crazy Mama"	January 26, 1976
Phyllis	"Sonny Boy"	February 16, 1976
Phyllis	"The Triangle"	March 1, 1976
Phyllis	"Phyllis Cries Wolf"	October 25, 1976
Phyllis	"Out of the Closet"	November 1, 1976
Phyllis	"Mother Dexter Cohabitates"	November 22, 1976
Phyllis	"Mother Dexter's Wedding"	December 6, 1976
Phyllis	"Bess Airs Her Views"	December 20, 1976
Phyllis	"Broken Hearted Bess"	January 30, 1977
Phyllis	"Dan's Ex"	February 13, 1977
Phyllis	"And Baby Makes Six"	March 13, 1977
The Mary Tyler Moore Show	"Mary and the Sexagenarian"	February 12, 1977
The Bob Newhart Show	"Bob's Change of Life"	September 24, 1977
The Bob Newhart Show	"Who Was That Masked Man?"	October 15, 1977
The Bob Newhart Show	"Happy Trails to You"	April 1, 1978
The Betty White Show	"Goodnight Sweet Fletch"	October 31, 1977
Taxi	"Come As You Aren't"	October 10, 1978
Taxi	"Paper Marriage"	October 31, 1978
Taxi	"Sugar Mama"	January 16, 1979
Taxi	"Elaine and the Lame Duck"	February 13, 1979
Taxi	"Mama Gravas"	February 27, 1979
Taxi	"Hollywood Calling"	May 8, 1979
Taxi	"Honor Thy Father"	September 18, 1979
Taxi	"Reverend Jim: A Space Odyssey"	September 25, 1979
Taxi	"Latka's Revolting"	November 27, 1979
Taxi	"Art Work"	March 4, 1980
Taxi	"Going Home"	December 17, 1980
Taxi	"Latka's Cookies"	February 5, 1981
Taxi	"Zen and the Art of Cab Driving"	March 19, 1981
Taxi	"Latka the Playboy"	May 21, 1981
Taxi	"Of Mice and Tony"	December 10, 1981
Taxi	"I Wanna Be Around"	January 7, 1982
Taxi	"Bobby Doesn't Live Here Anymore"	January 14, 1982
Cheers	"Give Me a Ring Sometime"	September 30, 1982
Cheers	"Sam at Eleven"	October 21, 1982
Cheers	"Showdown": Part 1	March 24, 1983
Cheers	"Showdown": Part 2	March 31, 1983
Cheers	"Power Play"	September 29, 1983
Cheers	"I'll Be Seeing You": Part 1	May 3, 1984
Cheers	"I'll Be Seeing You": Part 2	May 10, 1984
Cheers	"Rebound": Part 1	September 27, 1984
Cheers	"Rebound": Part 2	October 4, 1984
Cheers	"I Do, Adieu"	May 7, 1987
Cheers	"Home Is the Sailor"	September 24, 1987
Cheers	"One for the Road"	May 20, 1993
All Is Forgiven	"With Child"	March 20, 1986

=== Film ===
- Pushing Tin (1999)

== Personal lives ==
They were raised in Henderson, Nevada, as members of the Church of Jesus Christ of Latter-day Saints.
