= Cheers season 9 =

Cheers
- Season 9
- Region 1 DVD
- Showrunners: Cheri Eichen & Bill Steinkellner; Phoef Sutton
- Starring: Ted Danson; Kirstie Alley; Rhea Perlman; John Ratzenberger; Woody Harrelson; Kelsey Grammer; George Wendt
- No. of episodes: 26

Release
- Original network: NBC
- Original release: September 20, 1990 – May 3, 1991

Season chronology
- ← Previous; Season 8 Next → Season 10

The ninth season of the American television sitcom Cheers aired on NBC from September 20, 1990 to May 3, 1991. The show was created by director James Burrows and writers Glen and Les Charles under production team Charles Burrows Charles Productions, in association with Paramount Television.

== Background ==
Cheers is a sitcom that started in 1982. Though it experienced early low ratings, the show became a part of mainstream culture. The sitcom is set in a Boston bar originally owned by Sam Malone, a retired baseball pitcher, but Sam sells the bar at the start of Season 6. Waitress Carla Tortelli, bartender Woody Boyd and manager Rebecca Howe, work at the bar and serve regular patrons Norm Peterson, Cliff Clavin and Frasier Crane. The show was a key part of NBC's "Must See TV" Thursday night lineup.

== Cast and characters ==
- Ted Danson as Sam Malone
- Kirstie Alley as Rebecca Howe
- Rhea Perlman as Carla Tortelli
- John Ratzenberger as Cliff Clavin
- Woody Harrelson as Woody Boyd
- Kelsey Grammer as Frasier Crane
- George Wendt as Norm Peterson

Recurring characters

- Bebe Neuwirth as Lilith Sternin-Crane
- Jackie Swanson as Kelly Gaines
- Roger Rees as Robin Colcord

== Episodes ==
No. overall	No. in season	Title	Directed by	Written by	Original release date	U.S. viewers (millions)
195	1	"Love Is a Really, Really, Perfectly Okay Thing"	James Burrows	Phoef Sutton	September 20, 1990	32.9
Robin, returning from abroad and having realized that he loves Rebecca, finds her and Sam together in the office. They falsely convince Robin that they have not made love yet. Robin surrenders himself to authorities. The following day, Rebecca thanks Sam, who has become the bar manager again, for their time together, but an unenthusiastic Sam admits that the sex was not as great as he expected and tries to convince her that she still loves Robin. Angry, Rebecca assumes that he is implying about her being not great in bed and resigns from and then exits the bar. She returns to have her final paycheck corrected but also to apologize for storming out and to appreciate Sam's honesty and sincerity. As he assures her, Sam has great respect for their growing friendship, and the night they had together shall not affect it. After a long delay, Sam and Rebecca try to tell the rest of the gang what actually happened that night, but the gang is not convinced.
196	2	"Cheers Fouls Out" "Bar Wars IV"	James Burrows	Larry Balmagia	September 27, 1990	28.4
To beat Gary's Olde Towne Tavern in a $5,000-wager basketball game, Cheers acquires the Boston Celtics' Kevin McHale by claiming the game as a charity for orphans. Kevin eventually realizes the ruse and then relents when the Cheers gang does not want to risk losing their money. Kevin arranges the charity plan with a friend who is part of an orphanage's board of director. In the game, Kevin helps Cheers win by mostly scoring and then has a foot injury. After the game, a fake doctor sent by Gary (Joel Polis) falsely claims the injury to be more severe, prompting the gang to give the "doctor" $5,000 to cover the expense. Then, in contrast, Kevin appears walking healthily, so the gang realizes Gary's ploy. Gary is photographed with an oversized $5,000-check, Kevin, and a priest, devastating the Cheers gang. Kirstie Alley only appears in the cold open. Joel Polis and Robert Desiderio alternately reprise the role of Gary in other episodes. In this episode, Frasier claims that both his parents are dead. However, his father Martin turns up alive in Frasier. The inconsistency is clarified in the episode "The Show Where Sam Shows Up".
197	3	"Rebecca Redux"	James Burrows	Story by : Bill Steinkellner; Teleplay by : Cheri Eichen	October 4, 1990	30.4
Unable to secure another corporation job due to her relationship with Robin, Rebecca reluctantly becomes a model to test an automobile cleaning product against hazardous materials. Sam and Woody visit a car trade fair only to find Rebecca at her job and then rescue her. Sam, still unable to handle newly advanced office equipment, rehires Rebecca as his comanager and then fires recently hired Earl (Bryan Clark), whom everyone likes.
198	4	"Where Nobody Knows Your Name"	Andy Ackerman	Dan O'Shannon & Tom Anderson	October 11, 1990	32.9
When the press has not yet learned the name of Robin's true love, who has been the reason to give up his millions and then surrender himself, one of Robin's lovers Jeanne Marie Beaulier, a chargé d'affaires for a French consulate, falsely claims to be one, angering Rebecca enough to break a television and a billiard pool stick. Sam reluctantly visits Robin in prison on Rebecca's behalf to discuss Jeanne Marie. Robin corrects the press but still leaves his true love anonymous by having her described as "some Boston bar manager". Jeanne Marie still receives media attention. To placate Rebecca, Sam uses his past baseball career to exemplify how fame is not as "great" as it appears. Meanwhile, Boston's heat wave causes Carla to have an estrous cycle, prompting her to lock herself in the bar office. When Carla's tries to unlock the door, everyone evacuates from the bar.
199	5	"Ma Always Liked You Best"	Andy Ackerman	Dan O'Shannon & Tom Anderson	October 18, 1990	31.7
When Cliff denies Ma Clavin (Frances Sternhagen), who returns from her flight trip, a stay at his apartment, Woody lets Ma Clavin move into Woody's apartment, much to Cliff's chagrin. Woody and Ma Clavin increasingly bond. Then Woody and jealous Cliff challenge for Ma's affection, despite Ma's efforts to help them settle their differences. Meanwhile, Rebecca denies construction workers free beers and stops Sam from bribing them, causing the workers to slack off on constructing a trench outside the bar entrance. Norm reconstructs one of the bar's windows in the billiard room as an alternative entrance. While testing the results, he becomes stuck in the narrow gap of a modified window security. Rebecca has the police try to rescue Norm without avail. She becomes arrested when she tries bribing the police to excuse the lack of a building permit.
200	6	"Grease"	James Burrows	Brian Pollack & Mert Rich	October 25, 1990	29.9
Norm is devastated about the planned destruction of the Hungry Heifer. Inspired by Frasier's advice to take action, Norm petitions to save the Hungry Heifer, resulting in at least one hundred signatures. As it turns out, the Hungry Heifer is the only building on the city's eastern seaboard with "a giant red-eyed steam-snorting bull" and has a potential to become "a roadside landmark", leading to "a temporary injunction" halting the destruction. The place's owner Sid Nelson (Sheldon Leonard), wanting to retire with money from developers, becomes outraged and attempts to burn the place down. Norm stops Sid and refuses to continue the crime on his behalf. A while later, Sid has an employee do so instead. Meanwhile, Robin is sentenced to community service picking up refuse along the highway. Rebecca still insists her love for Robin, whom the gang has mocked.
201	7	"Breaking in Is Hard to Do"	Andy Ackerman	Ken Levine & David Isaacs	November 1, 1990	33.2
Rebecca receives Robin's explicit love letter and is unable to write such letter. Carla and Rebecca visit the prison holding Robin. Carla distracts the inmates amid one of them's birthday party. Rebecca tries to seduce Robin. However, he tells her that he will be paroled the following month or risk another year in prison if he does not abide the prison's restrictions on intimacy between prisoners and visitors. Rebecca leaves the prison devastated. Meanwhile, Frasier and Lilith are distraught over baby Frederick's "average" intelligence. In effort to trigger Frederick's higher intelligence, the Cranes decide to spend more time with him. Lilith has trouble setting up one of his diapers. Frasier takes him to the bar against her wishes, infuriating her. When Norm makes one of his signature entrances, Frederick shouts his first word, "Norm!" (normally used by bar mates), shocking everyone. Lilith happily mistakes it as "Mommy!"
202	8	"Cheers 200th Anniversary Special"	James Burrows & Andy Ackerman	Cheri Eichen & Bill Steinkellner & Phoef Sutton	November 8, 1990	45.9
A special recap of the first 199 episodes of Cheers, hosted by John McLaughlin, includes discussions with the cast (including former cast member Shelley Long), writers and directors of the series.
203	9	"Bad Neighbor Sam"	James Burrows	Cheri Eichen & Bill Steinkellner	November 15, 1990	34.1
Melville's new restaurateur, John Allen Hill, reveals ownership of the area behind the bar's hallway, including its billiard room and restrooms—which was previously Melville's basement—per title deed but lets him use the area. Then Hill gives Sam more demands, like moving Sam's red Chevrolet Corvette out of Hill's parking space. Sam parks in the same space again, prompting Hill to have the Corvette towed away. In response, Sam no longer allows Melville's and its customers, who predominate the bar one night while they await their tables, to use the stairs between Cheers and Melville's. In vengeance, Hill has the brick wall built the following week to block the hallway and the area behind it. Unable to win the battle, Sam reluctantly gives Hill rent money to regain access to the area. Hill then announces having the Corvette re-impounded for parking in a fire lane, affecting Sam's sanity. Meanwhile, Woody sees possibly a man's thumb in one of pictures of his girlfriend Kelly in Paris. Jealous, Woody accidentally dials a phone number of a chocolatier from Belgium, but Frasier purportedly mis-translates by falsely identifying an older French cleric, placating Woody.
204	10	"Veggie-Boyd"	James Burrows	Dan Staley & Rob Long	November 22, 1990	29.1
Woody tastes the Veggie Boy juice and finds it "disgusting", making him unhappy about appearing in its commercial. To make Woody like the juice more, Frasier puts Woody under hypnosis. The juice is discovered to be discontinued, devastating still hypnotic Woody. Meanwhile, Cliff is upset over "trivia napkins" receiving more attention and possibly outclassing him. Cliff tries to force bar mates to decide between the napkins and him. When they almost turn their backs on him, Cliff suggests having himself and the napkins co-live as an alternative, which everyone raves.
205	11	"Norm and Cliff's Excellent Adventure"	James Burrows	Ken Levine & David Isaacs	December 6, 1990	32.7
As one of their manipulations on others, Norm and Cliff pretend to be a credit card company claiming that a credit card used by Frasier to pay for drinks was reported "stolen". Sam destroys the card, causing a rift between Sam and Frasier. Feeling guilty, Norm and Cliff admit the scheme and then, as punishment, surrender their own credit cards, which are to be destroyed by Woody on Sam's behalf. Meanwhile, Woody repeatedly buys items from a shopping channel, making him shopaholic. NOTE: This episode is dedicated to Al Rosen, who played Al in the show.
206	12	"Woody Interruptus"	James Burrows	Dan Staley & Rob Long	December 13, 1990	33.8
Kelly brings Henrí (Anthony Cistaro) with her to Boston after a trip to France. Unbeknownst to her, his plan is to steal her away from Woody, who in turn becomes jealous and worried. Hoping to improve the relationship, Woody takes Kelly out to a cheap motel, suggested by Sam, for premarital sex. However, Carla arrives to stop them and tells them that making out in the same motel, where she got pregnant at age sixteen as claimed, is a bad idea for their precious love. Then the couple decide to save their moment for the right time, while Carla occupies the room in order to seduce Henrí. Meanwhile, Cliff tells his friends that he plans to freeze his head after death, but they mock him and his plans. Cliff, Frasier, and one of Frasier's colleagues pull a prank on the other patrons by bringing a box with a frozen head to the bar, which turns out to be only a microcassette in a metal box. In return, Frasier, Norm, and Paul pull a counter-prank on Cliff by pretending to have Norm alive yet decapitated. This episode marks Anthony Cistaro's first appearance as recurring character Henrí. Awards: Outstanding Directing - Comedy Series (Emmy Awards, 1991); Outstanding Directing - Comedy Series (Directors Guild of America Awards, 1990)
207	13	"Honor Thy Mother"	James Burrows	Brian Pollack & Mert Rich	January 3, 1991	38.6
Carla refuses the family naming tradition, as it would result in her new son being named Benito Mussolini. Woody's plan to issue free coupons for Cheers backfires.
208	14	"Achilles Hill"	Andy Ackerman	Ken Levine & David Isaacs	January 10, 1991	36.3
Woody brings in a foosball table, but Carla believes that it is evil. Sam begins dating Hill's daughter to get back at Hill. Guest star: Valerie Mahaffey
209	15	"The Days of Wine and Neuroses"	James Burrows	Brian Pollack & Mert Rich	January 24, 1991	32.3
Part 1 of 3. Robin proposes to Rebecca shortly before he is released from prison, but Rebecca gets drunk because she has doubts. Frasier becomes obsessed with a karaoke machine.
210	16	"Wedding Bell Blues"	James Burrows	Dan O'Shannon & Tom Anderson	January 31, 1991	32.7
Part 2 of 3. On the morning of her wedding, Rebecca finally realizes that she only loves Robin for his money, and he leaves with $6 million that he had hidden under her desk drawer. Guest appearance by Bobby Hatfield of the Righteous Brothers.
211	17	"I'm Getting My Act Together and Sticking It in Your Face"	Andy Ackerman	Dan Staley & Rob Long	February 7, 1991	31.5
Conclusion. Two days after the canceled wedding, Rebecca is still locked in her office and then leaves town. When she returns, Sam sees an opportunity. Frasier tries to get the gang interested in the works of Charles Dickens.
212	18	"Sam Time Next Year"	James Burrows	Larry Balmagia	February 14, 1991	31.9
Sam has a date with an old valentine (Barbara Feldon) but injures his back when he slips down the stairs outside Cheers. Frasier & Lillith try to help their patients get past social anxiety. Guest appearance by Michael Dukakis.
213	19	"Crash of the Titans"	James Burrows	Dan Staley & Rob Long	February 21, 1991	33.3
Sam and Rebecca try to buy the bar's poolroom and restrooms from John Allen Hill. In the end, Rebecca pays for the majority of the cost, in exchange for part ownership of Cheers.
214	20	"It's a Wonderful Wife"	James Burrows	Sue Herring	February 28, 1991	35.9
After Vera takes a job at Melville's, Norm looks for a new bar. Lilith has professional photos taken for Frasier's birthday.
215	21	"Cheers Has Chili"	Andy Ackerman	Cheri Eichen & Bill Steinkellner & Phoef Sutton	March 14, 1991	30.3
Rebecca turns the poolroom into a tea room and starts selling Woody's chili there after Sam dares her to make $500.
216	22	"Carla Loves Clavin"	James Burrows	Dan Staley & Rob Long	March 21, 1991	28.8
With the Miss Boston Barmaid contest held at Cheers, Sam is upset because the rules have changed, Carla enters to win a new car, and Cliff is one of the judges. Rebecca hires Norm to paint Sam's office.
217	23	"Pitch It Again, Sam"	James Burrows	Dan O'Shannon & Tom Anderson	March 28, 1991	30.8
Sam is invited to pitch to Dutch Kincaid, an old nemesis, at Yankee Stadium. Woody becomes attached to a dog that Cliff found.
218	24	"Rat Girl"	James Burrows	Ken Levine & David Isaacs	April 4, 1991	33.4
Sam strikes out with a girl who prefers Paul, Rebecca goes on a healthful eating kick, and Lilith has an unhealthy obsession with her dead lab rat.
219	25	"Home Malone"	Andy Ackerman	Dan O'Shannon & Tom Anderson	April 25, 1991	27.7
Rebecca hires Kelly to work in the bar. Sam runs into trouble when he babysits the Cranes' son, Frederick.
220	26	"Uncle Sam Wants You"	James Burrows	Dan Staley & Rob Long	May 2, 1991	31.3
Sam becomes obsessed with Frederick and begins to wonder about becoming a father. He asks Rebecca if she will be the mother. Guest: Pete Wilcox as Elvis Presley

== Accolades ==
In the 43rd Primetime Emmy Awards (1991), this season won four Emmys: Outstanding Comedy Series of 1990–1991, Outstanding Lead Actress in a Comedy Series (Kirstie Alley), Outstanding Supporting Actress in a Comedy Series (Bebe Neuwirth), and Outstanding Directing for a Comedy Series (James Burrows).
