= Cheers season 11 =

Cheers
- Season 11
- Region 1 DVD
- Showrunners: Tom Anderson; Dan O'Shannon
- Starring: Ted Danson; Kirstie Alley; Rhea Perlman; John Ratzenberger; Woody Harrelson; Kelsey Grammer; Bebe Neuwirth; George Wendt
- No. of episodes: 28

Release
- Original network: NBC
- Original release: September 24, 1992 – May 20, 1993

Season chronology
- ← Previous; Season 10

The eleventh and final season of the American television sitcom Cheers aired on NBC from September 24, 1992 to May 20, 1993. The show was created by director James Burrows and writers Glen and Les Charles under the production team Charles Burrows Charles Productions, in association with Paramount Television.

== Cast and characters ==
- Ted Danson as Sam Malone
- Kirstie Alley as Rebecca Howe
- Rhea Perlman as Carla Tortelli
- John Ratzenberger as Cliff Clavin
- Woody Harrelson as Woody Boyd
- Kelsey Grammer as Frasier Crane
- Bebe Neuwirth as Lilith Sternin-Crane (Note: Neuwirth only appears in the opening credits for episodes in which she appears.)
- George Wendt as Norm Peterson

== Episodes ==
No. overall	No. in season	Title	Directed by	Written by	Original release date	U.S. viewers (millions)
247	1	"The Little Match Girl"	James Burrows	Dan Staley & Rob Long	September 24, 1992	28.7
After deciding to quit smoking, Rebecca tosses her last cigarette in the office trash can, inadvertently setting the bar ablaze. Note: Fire Marshal: Robert Machray
248	2	"The Beer Is Always Greener"	James Burrows	Tom Leopold	October 1, 1992	24.8
Carla is forced to clean up her act and behave nicely when she has to find another job while Cheers is being rebuilt. Woody's faith in Kelly is shaken when he learns they belong to two different Lutheran church bodies. Note: Bernard: Glenn Shadix. Ellen: Julia Montgomery
249	3	"The King of Beers"	John Ratzenberger	Dan O'Shannon	October 8, 1992	23.1
Norm's new job seems like a dream come true when he becomes a beer taster at a brewery. Rebecca finds she can't tear herself away from the bar's new slot machine.
250	4	"The Magnificent Six"	James Burrows	Sue Herring	October 22, 1992	20.6
Henrí challenges Sam to a contest to see who's the bigger ladies' man. Rebecca resorts to desperate measures in her quest to quit smoking. Note: Woody Harrelson does not appear in this episode.
251	5	"Do Not Forsake Me O' My Postman"	James Burrows	Ken Levine & David Isaacs	October 29, 1992	24.0
Maggie returns to Cheers and Cliff, this time claiming she's carrying his baby. Rebecca hires a hack songwriter (John Mahoney) to create a jingle for the bar. John Mahoney would later portray Frasier Crane's father Martin on the spinoff series Frasier.
252	6	"Teaching with the Enemy"	James Burrows	Tom Anderson	November 5, 1992	28.5
Part 1 of 2. Rebecca spots Lilith with another man and doesn't know whether to tell Frasier that his wife is cheating on him. Meanwhile, Sam hires a menacing bouncer named Tiny but can't bring himself to fire him when the hulking man scares everyone.
253	7	"The Girl in the Plastic Bubble"	James Burrows	Dan O'Shannon	November 12, 1992	29.6
Conclusion. A distraught Frasier ends up on a ledge, feigning suicide, after Lilith informs him that she wants to spend a year away from him, sealed in a biosphere with her lover.
254	8	"Ill-Gotten Gaines"	James Burrows	Fred Graver	November 19, 1992	24.0
Kelly's father is convinced that Woody has blackmail on his mind when Woody sees Mr. Gaines having affair with his brother's wife. Rebecca plans to hold a Thanksgiving dinner at the bar.
255	9	"Feelings...Whoa, Whoa, Whoa"	Rick Beren	Kathy Ann Stumpe	December 3, 1992	22.9
Carla tries to hide her feelings when John Hill has a heart attack. Cliff goes around telling people that Adolf Hitler moved into his apartment building.
256	10	"Daddy's Middle-Aged Girl"	James Burrows	Rebecca Parr Cioffi	December 10, 1992	21.4
Rebecca's father (Robert Prosky) attempts to make her return with him to San Diego while Woody tries to exert his will over Kelly, to make her move her things to his apartment.
257	11	"Love Me, Love My Car"	James Burrows	David Lloyd	December 17, 1992	23.4
Sam wants to reacquire his beloved car and goes so far as to romance the buyer's widow (Dana Delany) to get it back. Rebecca befriends a pig destined to be Woody's Christmas dinner.
258	12	"Sunday Dinner"	James Burrows	Fred Graver	January 7, 1993	22.7
Frasier decides to start dating other women now that Lilith has left him, and makes a date with his young secretary, Shauna. He ends up having dinner with Shauna's family. Meanwhile, Cheers is hosting an anniversary party, and Cliff and Norm are hired to videotape it.
259	13	"Norm's Big Audit"	John Ratzenberger	Tom Leopold	January 14, 1993	25.9
Norm can avoid an audit, if he'll just sleep with his investigating IRS agent. Sam is very reluctant to let the gang watch a videotape of one of his old games. Note: Woody Harrelson does not appear in this episode.
260	14	"It's a Mad, Mad, Mad Bar"	James Burrows	Rebecca Parr Cioffi	January 21, 1993	25.4
The gang at Cheers turn the bar upside-down when they believe Robin Colcord has stashed away a good sum of money somewhere in the establishment. Note: Woody Harrelson only appears in the cold open. Note: Last appearance of Roger Rees as "Robin Colcord".
261	15	"Loathe and Marriage"	James Burrows	Ken Levine & David Isaacs	February 4, 1993	27.1
Carla's daughter Serafina (Leah Remini) insists on having her father, Nick Tortelli, walk her down the aisle, despite Carla's objections. Note: Last appearance of Dan Hedaya as "Nick Tortelli".
262	16	"Is There a Doctor in the Howe?"	James Burrows	Kathy Ann Stumpe	February 11, 1993	28.4
Part 1 of 2. Upon learning that his marriage may be over, Frasier is thrown a surprise party to help cheer him up. Things go a bit further than expected after Rebecca offers to drive the doctor home for the evening.
263	17	"The Bar Manager, the Shrink, His Wife and Her Lover"	James Burrows	Kathy Ann Stumpe	February 18, 1993	24.7
Conclusion. After returning from the Eco-pod, Lilith is shocked to find Rebecca consoling Frasier. Meanwhile, Lilith's "lover" is not very happy with her departure and takes extreme measures to ensure her return to the underground. Note: Final appearance of Bebe Neuwirth as Dr. Lilith Sternin.
264	18	"The Last Picture Show"	James Burrows	Fred Graver	February 25, 1993	28.0
The guys head to the old drive-in movie theater for one last flick before it is to be torn down. Cheers' former owner, Gus, returns and runs the bar for one night.
265	19	"Bar Wars VII: The Naked Prey"	James Burrows	Ken Levine & David Isaacs	March 18, 1993	27.5
When Gary from Gary's Olde Towne Tavern raises the stakes of their St. Patrick's Day bet and Cheers loses, the Cheers gang is forced to perform for Gary's patrons naked. Sam asks for the help of con artist "Harry the Hat" in getting back at Gary, but Harry declines. Later, Gary's Olde Towne Tavern is bulldozed to the ground and Sam becomes the number-one suspect that Gary turns to. However, it's revealed that Gary had actually bulldozed his own bar after being promised a million dollars for his property. Gary introduces the real estate developer he's selling to: it's Harry, who cheerfully announces that the million-dollar check he's written to Gary is going to bounce since Harry used an alias for the check, leaving Gary with no money and no bar and making Cheers the official winner of their long feud. The gang luxuriates in the victory Harry has won for them, at least until Sam realizes that Harry had stolen all the money from the cash register on his way out. Note: Last appearance of Harry Anderson as "Harry 'The Hat' Gittes".
266	20	"Look Before You Sleep"	James Burrows	Rebecca Parr Cioffi	April 1, 1993	26.3
Sam locks himself out of the bar with his keys and wallet inside, so he begins a search for a place to sleep for the night, which proves more difficult than expected.
267	21	"Woody Gets an Election"	James Burrows	Dan O'Shannon & Tom Anderson & Dan Staley & Rob Long	April 22, 1993	27.6
Frasier decides to conduct an experiment in voter psychology by getting Woody on the ballot for city council (due to Frasier not being able to find a monkey for the experiment) and is shocked by the results. During the campaign against the incumbent (Philip Baker Hall), Woody is interviewed by a reporter (Peri Gilpin). Spanky McFarland visits Cheers, but denies who he is to avoid talking to Cliff.
268	22	"It's Lonely on the Top"	James Burrows	Heide Perlman	April 29, 1993	29.8
After sleeping with Paul, Carla can't come to grips with what she has done. In an effort to console his best friend, Sam lets her in on a little secret of his own.
269	23	"Rebecca Gaines, Rebecca Loses"	James Burrows	David Lloyd	May 6, 1993	30.8
270	24	"Rebecca Gaines, Rebecca Loses"	James Burrows	David Lloyd	May 6, 1993	30.8
After Woody, Kelly and her father Walter arrive at Cheers talking about classical music (they'd been to a symphony), Rebecca joins in the conversation and impresses Walter. He invites her to a society function. Rebecca thinks it is a date and is thrilled to bits – but is in for a shock when she arrives. Meanwhile Esther Clavin has been put in a retirement home by Cliff, but while Cliff feels guilty, the others think he has murdered his mother.
271	25	"The Guy Can't Help It"	James Burrows	David Angell & Peter Casey & David Lee	May 13, 1993	29.5
Rebecca finds herself really attracted to a handsome plumber, Don Santry. Sam joins a help group for sexual compulsives.
272	26	"One for the Road"	James Burrows	Glen Charles & Les Charles	May 20, 1993	80.4
273	27	"One for the Road"	James Burrows	Glen Charles & Les Charles	May 20, 1993	80.4
274	28	"One for the Road"	James Burrows	Glen Charles & Les Charles	May 20, 1993	80.4
Diane returns to Boston after winning an award for her writings, although her life isn't exactly as it appears. Sam potentially leaves Cheers for good. Woody gets a job for Norm, and Cliff receives a promotion, while Rebecca hopes to wed Don. The gang ponders the meaning of life.
