= Cheers season 10 =

Cheers
- Season 10
- Region 1 DVD
- Showrunners: Cheri Eichen & Bill Steinkellner; Phoef Sutton
- Starring: Ted Danson; Kirstie Alley; Rhea Perlman; John Ratzenberger; Woody Harrelson; Kelsey Grammer; Bebe Neuwirth; George Wendt
- No. of episodes: 25/26 (one-double length episode)

Release
- Original network: NBC
- Original release: September 19, 1991 – May 14, 1992

Season chronology
- ← Previous; Season 9 Next → Season 11

The tenth season of the American television sitcom Cheers aired on NBC from September 19, 1991 to May 14, 1992. The show was created by director James Burrows and writers Glen and Les Charles under production team Charles Burrows Charles Productions, in association with Paramount Television.

== Cast and characters ==
- Ted Danson as Sam Malone
- Kirstie Alley as Rebecca Howe
- Rhea Perlman as Carla Tortelli
- John Ratzenberger as Cliff Clavin
- Woody Harrelson as Woody Boyd
- Kelsey Grammer as Frasier Crane
- Bebe Neuwirth as Lilith Sternin-Crane
- George Wendt as Norm Peterson

== Episodes ==
No. overall	No. in season	Title	Directed by	Written by	Original release date	U.S. viewers (millions)
221	1	"Baby Balk"	James Burrows	Dan O'Shannon & Tom Anderson	September 19, 1991	31.4
Sam and Rebecca decide to have a baby, but each get advice from Frasier and Lilith that kills the mood. Woody is left in charge of the bar while Sam and Rebecca are out spending the evening with each other. He has a hard time dealing with some bowlers and their smoking.
222	2	"Get Your Kicks on Route 666"	James Burrows	Dan O'Shannon & Tom Anderson	September 26, 1991	30.3
Sam, Frasier, Cliff, and Norm attempt to take a cross-country road trip. Meanwhile, back at the bar, Rebecca and Lilith ogle Carla's nephew Frankie. Note: Woody Harrelson does not appear in this episode.
223	3	"Madame LaCarla"	Tom Moore	Phoef Sutton	October 3, 1991	29.6
When Carla's psychic decides to retire, she selects Carla to succeed her. After receiving a bad review, Woody begins to doubt his acting abilities.
224	4	"The Norm Who Came to Dinner"	Tom Moore	Dan O'Shannon & Tom Anderson	October 10, 1991	27.8
Lilith and Frasier must deal with Norm as a house guest when he is injured painting their living room.
225	5	"Ma's Little Maggie"	James Burrows	Tracy Newman & Jonathan Stark	October 17, 1991	24.5
Cliff must confront his mother on being overbearing after she proposes to his girlfriend when his Ma feels it is time. Rebecca wants Sam to stop drinking coffee and stop wearing briefs to help their chances of conceiving.
226	6	"Unplanned Parenthood"	James Burrows	Dan Staley & Rob Long	October 24, 1991	25.3
Sam and Rebecca decide to babysit all of Carla's children in an effort to test their parenting skills. Meanwhile, Cliff helps Woody make a video to introduce Kelly to his family.
227	7	"Bar Wars V: The Final Judgment"	James Burrows	Ken Levine & David Isaacs	October 31, 1991	28.2
The Cheers crew prepares for their annual Halloween prank war with Gary's Olde Towne Tavern. This time, Sam may have gone a little too far.
228	8	"Where Have All the Floorboards Gone?"	James Burrows	Ken Levine & David Isaacs	November 7, 1991	29.3
The gang feels responsible when the Celtics' Kevin McHale goes into a slump after becoming obsessed with the number of bolts in the floor of Boston Garden.
229	9	"Head Over Hill"	John Ratzenberger	Dan Staley & Rob Long	November 14, 1991	27.8
After getting on Sam's nerves over the use of Melville's dumpsters, John Allen Hill is to be humiliated by Carla at Sam's request. Much to everyone's surprise, including her own, Carla ends up sleeping with Hill instead.
230	10	"A Fine French Whine"	James Burrows	Dan Staley & Rob Long	November 21, 1991	29.2
Woody wants to propose to Kelly, but Henrí and his expiring visa take precedence.
231	11	"I'm Okay, You're Defective"	James Burrows	Dan Staley & Rob Long	December 5, 1991	27.3
Frasier has to face making out a will while Sam braces himself for bad news from Rebecca's fertility doctor. In the end, after Frasier sets all of his affairs in order, Sam decides not to look at his sperm count and burns the envelope without opening it. Frasier's will is opened many decades later at his funeral to reveal that Sam's sperm count is perfectly average, indicating that Sam had accidentally burned the wrong envelope. The elderly Lilith immediately says, "that damn bar..."
232	12	"Go Make"	James Burrows	Phoef Sutton	December 12, 1991	27.5
Sam and Rebecca let their imaginations run free during a night of baby-making and dream up different versions of their future progeny, ultimately deciding against having a child together. Norm, Cliff, and Frasier participate in a polar bear plunge.
233	13	"Don't Shoot...I'm Only the Psychiatrist"	James Burrows	Kathy Ann Stumpe	January 2, 1992	30.0
Cliff and Norm help Frasier's low esteem self-help group really help themselves, and Woody makes a mistake while trimming Sam's hair.
234	14	"No Rest for the Woody"	James Burrows	Tracy Newman & Jonathan Stark	January 9, 1992	24.6
Woody's extracurricular work as a gravedigger may pay for Kelly's engagement ring, but it also jeopardizes his first meeting with her grandmother (Celeste Holm). Carla avoids giving a blood sample. Rebecca attempts to fix the furnace.
235	15	"My Son, the Father"	James Burrows	Dan Staley & Rob Long	January 16, 1992	26.7
Carla uses her son's decision to enter the priesthood to prank with impunity but finds herself in a bind when he decides to become a male model instead. Sam finds a way to get even with John Hill. Cliff tries to begin a stand-up comedy career.
236	16	"One Hugs, the Other Doesn't"	James Burrows	Cheri Eichen & Bill Steinkellner	January 30, 1992	26.4
A Boston performance by children's singer Nanny Gee (Emma Thompson) for Frederick's birthday sheds light on Frasier's past as Lilith and the barflies discover Nanny is Frasier's first wife. Frasier had forgotten to mention this fact to Lilith and when Nanny Gee arrives at Cheers she and Lilith soon get into a catfight.
237	17	"A Diminished Rebecca with a Suspended Cliff"	James Burrows	Dan O'Shannon & Tom Anderson	February 6, 1992	29.7
Woody's cousin (Harry Connick, Jr.) develops a crush on Rebecca and Cliff is very unhappy with the new postal uniforms.
238	18	"License to Hill"	James Burrows	Ken Levine & David Isaacs	February 13, 1992	22.6
Rebecca takes control of the bar while Sam and the gang play a game of poker. While trying to impress Sam by showing her responsibility, Rebecca finds out she forgot to renew the liquor license. Now they must serve non-alcoholic drinks without anyone knowing the difference until it is renewed. It turns out it was Sam's fault since he put the wrong postal stamp on the envelope, so it was returned. Note: Frasier mentions he and Lilith are taking a flight to Nantucket the following day. This storyline is shown on Wings in the crossover episode "Planes, Trains, and Visiting Cranes", which aired the same night.
239	19	"Rich Man, Wood Man"	James Burrows	Daniel Palladino	February 20, 1992	21.9
The gang tries to bring Woody back to earth after a vacation in London with Kelly and her money. Frasier hires Sam as his personal trainer.
240	20	"Smotherly Love"	James Burrows	Kathy Ann Stumpe	February 27, 1992	26.7
Lilith's overbearing mother comes to town for the renewal of the Crane's wedding vows and proceeds to take over every little detail. Norm comes into some money from a roulette win, and Rebecca wants Sam to get him to pay off his bar tab.
241	21	"Take Me Out of the Ball Game"	James Burrows	Kathy Ann Stumpe	March 26, 1992	23.9
Sam ponders a baseball comeback, but when he goes to play a few games, he discovers most of the players are much younger and more immature than he is. They're acting just like he used to, and Sam doesn't think he enjoys acting like that anymore. Meanwhile, back in Boston, Frasier loses Lilith's favorite lab rat and tries to get an identical one before she returns.
242	22	"Rebecca's Lover...Not"	James Burrows	Tracy Newman & Jonathan Stark	April 23, 1992	22.1
Rebecca's old high school flame Mark (Harvey Fierstein) moves to Boston. Oblivious to Mark's obvious homosexuality, Rebecca is convinced they are meant to be together. When she tries to seduce him, he explains that although she's the only woman who ever "confused" him, he is gay. They cuddle on the couch to watch TV and commiserate about how difficult it is to pursue relationships with men. Meanwhile, Sam's Corvette is stolen and he forms a support group for victims of auto theft, only to disband it the moment his car is found. Kelly spends time with the bar's patrons to better understand Woody's life. Cliff shows off photos his mother has doctored.
243	23	"Bar Wars VI: This Time It's for Real"	Rick Beren	Ken Levine & David Isaacs	April 30, 1992	30.5
Gary has sold his bar to a suspicious new owner whom the gang at Cheers decide to haze. It appears that they're in way over their heads when it is learned who the new owner really is and must now deal with potential consequences. Rebecca gets a magazine-sponsored makeover. Note: Senator John Kerry appears as himself in the pre-credits sequence. His last name is misspelled as Kerrey in the closing credits.
244	24	"Heeeeere's...Cliffy!"	James Burrows	Ken Levine & David Isaacs	May 7, 1992	25.4
Cliff purchases tickets to see The Tonight Show after believing the joke he sent to the writers was accepted and will appear on-air. Sam and Woody wax philosophic while installing a satellite dish. Johnny Carson appears as himself.
245	25	"An Old-Fashioned Wedding"	James Burrows	David Lloyd	May 14, 1992	32.9
246	26	"An Old-Fashioned Wedding"	James Burrows	David Lloyd	May 14, 1992	32.9
The time has come for Woody and Kelly to wed, despite Carla's predictions that the event will be disastrous, which may very well be the case.
