= Cheers (Spanish TV series) =

- Based on: Cheers by Glen and Les Charles; James Burrows
- Starring: Alberto San Juan; Antonio Resines; Alexandra Jiménez; Chiqui Fernández; Joan Pera; Pepón Nieto; Luis Bermejo; Adam Jeziersky
- Theme music composer: Gary Portnoy; Judy Hart Angelo
- Opening theme: "Donde la gente se divierte (Where Everybody Knows Your Name)"; Performed by Dani Martín
- Country of origin: Spain
- Original language: Spanish
- No. of seasons: 1
- No. of episodes: 13 (4 unaired)

Production
- Running time: 30 minutes

Original release
- Network: Telecinco
- Release: September 11, 2011 – July 16, 2012

Related
- Cheers (Original American version)

Cheers is the Spanish version of the American sitcom of same name created by Glen and Les Charles and James Burrows. It was produced by Plural Entertainment and Tom Collins and broadcast by Telecinco. It was first aired on 11 September 2011, and follows the same theme as its American counterpart.

== Production ==
On April 25, 2011, Telecinco unveiled the names of the main actors for the new sitcom, Antonio Resines and Alexandra Jiménez. Resines would be Frasier Crane and Jiménez would be Rebecca Howe. Three days later, both producing companies, Plural Entertainment and Tom Collins Productions, started filming the pilot episode.

On July 28, 2011, Mediaset Spain presented on a press conference the remake of Cheers with the future main cast members of the series, among them Alberto San Juan.

The first season was to have 26 episodes, around 30 minutes of length each. It was released on September 11, 2011, with a double episode.

The theme song from the original Cheers, "Where Everybody Knows Your Name" was translated as Donde la gente se divierte, and it was performed by Dani Martín, former singer from El Canto del Loco.

== Plot ==
Nico (Alberto San Juan) is the owner of an Irish pub named Cheers. He is a former footballer, womanizer, vain and a little bit illiterate who cannot help flirting with any attractive woman he sees in his way. His friend Félix (Antonio Resines) is a psychiatrist, very much analytic and unsure, who is forced to look for alternative jobs. Rebeca (Alexandra Jiménez) is a cultured woman who has seen herself forced to work as a waitress after her father went bankrupt.

Actor/Actress	Character	Cheers original character
Alberto San Juan	Nicolás "Nico" Arnedo	Sam Malone
Antonio Resines	Félix Simón de Aguirre	Frasier Crane
Alexandra Jiménez	Rebeca Santaolalla	Diane Chambers & Rebecca Howe
Pepón Nieto	Blas Román	Norm Peterson
Luis Bermejo	Ricardo Rodero	Cliff Clavin
Chiqui Fernández	Dolores "Lola" Mendoza	Carla Tortelli
Joan Pera	Pedro "Míster" Panero	Ernie "Coach" Pantusso
Adam Jezierski	Yuri Semionov	Woody Boyd

=== Cameos ===
Cheers had guest stars such as Ana Belén, José Coronado, Carolina Bang, Luis Varela, Xavier Deltell, Jaime Blanch, Sara Carbonero and Carlos Areces, among others.

== Link ==
Official Website
