= Woody Interruptus =

- Cheers episode
- Episode no.: Season 9 Episode 12
- Directed by: James Burrows
- Written by: Dan Staley and Rob Long
- Original air date: December 13, 1990

Guest appearances
- Jackie Swanson as Kelly; Michael Keenan as Dr. Eckworth; Douglas MacHugh as Night Manager; Anthony Cistaro as Henrí; Paul Willson as Paul; Tony DiBenedetto as Tony

Episode chronology
← Previous "Norm and Cliff's Excellent Adventure"	Next → "Honor Thy Mother"
- Cheers (season 9)

"Woody Interruptus" is the twelfth episode of Cheers's ninth season. It first aired on NBC in the United States on December 13, 1990. In the episode, Kelly returns from France with a male friend who says he's going to steal her from Woody. Woody deals with this by deciding to sleep with Kelly. This episode earned its director James Burrows accolades for Best Directing in 1991 and gained high viewership at its first airing.

== Plot ==
Kelly and Henrí return from France. Henrí, who Sam later learns is an arrogant womanizer during a conversation with him at the bar, swears to Woody that he is attempting to steal Kelly from Woody. Woody becomes angry as he realizes that Henrí is serious about his claims to take Kelly from him, while the naïve Kelly often dismisses Woody's concerns, claiming Henrí's attempts as jokes. When Woody becomes worried about losing her to Henrí, Sam suggests a motel to improve Woody and Kelly's relationship. Woody takes Kelly out to a cheap motel for their evening together, but Carla arrives to stop them. Carla tells them that making out in a cheap motel is a bad idea, that she got pregnant when she was sixteen in the same motel, and that their love is too precious for such a setting. Then the couple decide to save their moment for the right time, so they leave, while Carla brings in and then tries to seduce Henrí.

Meanwhile, Cliff tells his friends that he plans to freeze his head after death, but they mock him and his plans. Therefore, Cliff and Frasier pull a prank on bar patrons by bringing a box of apparently a frozen head, which turn out to be only a microcassette. At the end, Frasier, Norm and Paul pull a prank on Cliff by pretending to be decapitated.

== Reception ==
The episode earned director James Burrows the Primetime Emmy Award for Outstanding Directing for a Comedy Series at the 43rd Primetime Emmy Awards in 1991, as well as the Directors Guild of America Award for Outstanding Directing – Comedy Series at the 43rd Directors Guild of America Awards.

The episode placed first in the Nielsen Media Research Ratings for the week. It scored a 22.6 rating and a 36 share, which placed it ahead of second-place finisher 60 Minutes, which had a 20.6 rating and a 36 share. The episode was watched by an estimate of 33.8 million viewers.
