= Bar Wars (disambiguation) =

Bar Wars is an album by saxophonist Willis Jackson.

Bar Wars may also refer to:

- the title of a number of episodes of the American television sitcom Cheers:
  - Cheers season 6, episode #144 "Bar Wars"
  - Cheers season 7, episode #156 "Bar Wars II: The Woodman Strikes Back"
  - Cheers season 8, episode #189 "Bar Wars III: The Return of Tecumseh"
  - Cheers season 9, episode #196 "Bar Wars IV: Cheers Fouls Out"
  - Cheers season 10, episodes #227 "Bar Wars V: The Final Judgment" and #243 "Bar Wars VI: This Time It's for Real"
  - Cheers season 11, episode #266 "Bar Wars VII: The Naked Prey"
- Bar Wars (Tales From the Floating Vagabond), a 1991 supplement for the role-playing game Tales From the Floating Vagabond
