= 40th Primetime Emmy Awards =

1988 American television programming awards

- Date: August 28, 1988 (Ceremony); August 27, 1988 (Creative Arts Awards)
- Location: Pasadena Civic Auditorium, Pasadena, California, U.S.
- Presented by: Academy of Television Arts and Sciences
- Hosted by: John Forsythe

Highlights
- Most awards: Thirtysomething (3)
- Most nominations: L.A. Law (15)
- Outstanding Comedy Series: The Wonder Years
- Outstanding Drama Series: Thirtysomething
- Outstanding Miniseries: The Murder of Mary Phagan
- Outstanding Variety, Music or Comedy Program: Irving Berlin's 100th Birthday Celebration

Television/radio coverage
- Network: Fox
- Produced by: Lorne Michaels

The 40th Primetime Emmy Awards were held on Sunday, August 28, 1988. The ceremony was broadcast on Fox from the Pasadena Civic Auditorium in Pasadena, California, where 26 awards were presented. The ceremony was held earlier than its traditional September date to avoid conflict with the 1988 Summer Olympics in Seoul, South Korea. Cable stations HBO and Showtime received their first major nominations at this ceremony.

Despite a season that consisted of only six episodes, newcomer series The Wonder Years won Outstanding Comedy Series. After winning his fourth consecutive Primetime Emmy Award for Outstanding Supporting Actor in a Comedy Series, John Larroquette requested to have his name taken off the ballot for future ceremonies. Frank's Place became the most recent show whose only season was nominated for Outstanding Comedy/Drama Series until Bodyguard in 2019.

In the drama field L.A. Law came into the ceremony as the defending champ and with 15 major nominations, (second most ever by a drama series at that time), it was seen as the heavy favorite. However, it was upset by another first season show, Thirtysomething which won three major awards on the night including Outstanding Drama Series. L.A. Law only won one major award. The duo of Cagney & Lacey won Outstanding Lead Actress in a Drama Series for the sixth consecutive year. This tied The Mary Tyler Moore Show's record for acting categories, which still stands. (It stood for all categories until The Daily Show with Jon Stewart won ten consecutive Primetime Emmy Awards for Outstanding Variety, Music, or Comedy Series.) With the wins for Bea Arthur and Estelle Getty, The Golden Girls became the most recent show to have all of its cast members win Emmys. It became the second series to do so, following All in the Family. Three other programs would accomplish this feat: Will & Grace in 2003, The Simpsons in 2014, and Schitt's Creek in 2020.

There was controversy during the nomination process regarding the PBS series Rumpole of the Bailey. The series was initially placed in the miniseries field, but soon after the Academy disqualified it and placed it in the drama series field. Its slot in the miniseries category was filled by The Bourne Identity.

== Winners and nominees ==
=== Programs ===
Programs
Outstanding Comedy Series: The Wonder Years (ABC); Cheers (NBC); Frank's Place (CBS); The Golden Girls (NBC); Night Court (NBC)	Outstanding Drama Series: Thirtysomething (ABC); Beauty and the Beast (CBS); L.A. Law (NBC); Rumpole of the Bailey (PBS); St. Elsewhere (NBC)
Outstanding Drama/Comedy Special: Inherit the Wind (NBC); The Ann Jillian Story (NBC); The Attic: The Hiding of Anne Frank (CBS); Foxfire (CBS); The Taking of Flight 847: The Uli Derickson Story (NBC)	Outstanding Miniseries: The Murder of Mary Phagan (NBC); Baby M (ABC); Billionaire Boys Club (NBC); The Bourne Identity (ABC); Lincoln (NBC)
Outstanding Variety, Music or Comedy Program: Irving Berlin's 100th Birthday Celebration (CBS); Late Night with David Letterman (NBC); Late Night with David Letterman 6th Anniversary Special (NBC); The Smothers Brothers Comedy Hour (CBS); The Tracey Ullman Show (Fox)

=== Acting ===
==== Lead performances ====
Acting
Outstanding Lead Actor in a Comedy Series: Michael J. Fox as Alex P. Keaton in Family Ties (NBC) (Episode: "The Last of the Red Hot Psychologists"); Dabney Coleman as Slap Maxwell in The Slap Maxwell Story (ABC) (Episode: "Episode #2"); Ted Danson as Sam Malone in Cheers (NBC); Tim Reid as Frank Paris in Frank's Place (CBS) (Episode: "The Bridge"); John Ritter as Harry Hooperman in Hooperman (ABC) (Episode: "Pilot")	Outstanding Lead Actress in a Comedy Series: Bea Arthur as Dorothy Zbornak in The Golden Girls (NBC) (Episode: "My Brother, My Father"); Kirstie Alley as Rebecca Howe in Cheers (NBC) (Episode: "Backseat Becky, Upfront"); Blair Brown as Molly Dodd in The Days and Nights of Molly Dodd (NBC); Rue McClanahan as Blanche Devereaux in The Golden Girls (NBC) (Episode: "Strange Bedfellows"); Betty White as Rose Nylund in The Golden Girls (NBC) (Episode: "Bringing Up Baby")
Outstanding Lead Actor in a Drama Series: Richard Kiley as Joe Gardner in A Year in the Life (NBC) (Episode: "What Do People Do All Day"); Corbin Bernsen as Arnie Becker in L.A. Law (NBC); Ron Perlman as Vincent in Beauty and the Beast (CBS); Michael Tucker as Stuart Markowitz in L.A. Law (NBC); Edward Woodward as Robert McCall in The Equalizer (CBS)	Outstanding Lead Actress in a Drama Series: Tyne Daly as Mary Beth Lacey in Cagney & Lacey (CBS) (Episode: "Friendly Fire"); Susan Dey as Grace Van Owen in L.A. Law (NBC); Jill Eikenberry as Ann Kelsey in L.A. Law (NBC); Sharon Gless as Christine Cagney in Cagney & Lacey (CBS); Angela Lansbury as Jessica Fletcher in Murder, She Wrote (CBS)
Outstanding Lead Actor in a Miniseries or a Special: Jason Robards as Henry Drummond in Inherit the Wind (NBC); Hume Cronyn as Hector Nations in Foxfire (CBS); Danny Glover as Nelson Mandela in Mandela (HBO); Stacy Keach as Ernest Hemingway in Hemingway (Syndicated) (Episode: "Part I"); Jack Lemmon as Gov. John Slaton in The Murder of Mary Phagan (NBC)	Outstanding Lead Actress in a Miniseries or a Special: Jessica Tandy as Annie Nations in Foxfire (CBS); Ann Jillian as Herself in The Ann Jillian Story (NBC); Mary Tyler Moore as Mary Todd Lincoln in Lincoln (NBC); Mary Steenburgen as Miep Gies in The Attic: The Hiding of Anne Frank (CBS); JoBeth Williams as Marybeth Whitehead in Baby M (ABC)

==== Supporting performances ====
Outstanding Supporting Actor in a Comedy Series: John Larroquette as Dan Fielding in Night Court (NBC) (Episode: "No Hard Feelings"); Kelsey Grammer as Dr. Frasier Crane in Cheers (NBC) (Episode: "The Crane Mutiny"); Woody Harrelson as Woody Boyd in Cheers (NBC) (Episode: "The Big Kiss-Off"); Peter Scolari as Michael Harris in Newhart (CBS) (Episode: "The Big Uneasy"); George Wendt as Norm Peterson in Cheers (NBC) (Episode: "Let Sleeping Drakes Lie")	Outstanding Supporting Actress in a Comedy Series: Estelle Getty as Sophia Petrillo in The Golden Girls (NBC) (Episode: "Old Friends"); Julia Duffy as Stephanie Vanderkellen in Newhart (CBS) (Episode: "Till Depth Do Us Part: Part 1"); Jackée Harry as Sandra Clark in 227 (NBC) (Episode: "The Talk Show"); Katherine Helmond as Mona Robinson in Who's the Boss? (ABC) (Episode: "Marry Me, Mona"); Rhea Perlman as Carla Tortelli in Cheers (NBC) (Episode: "Slumber Party Massacred")
Outstanding Supporting Actor in a Drama Series: Larry Drake as Benny Stulwicz in L.A. Law (NBC) (Episodes: "The Brothers Grimm" + "Full Marital Jacket"); Ed Begley Jr. as Dr. Victor Ehrlich in St. Elsewhere (NBC); Timothy Busfield as Elliot Weston in Thirtysomething (ABC) (Episode: "Therapy"); Alan Rachins as Douglas Brackman, Jr. in L.A. Law (NBC); Jimmy Smits as Victor Sifuentes in L.A. Law (NBC)	Outstanding Supporting Actress in a Drama Series: Patricia Wettig as Nancy Krieger Weston in Thirtysomething (ABC) (Episode: "Therapy"); Bonnie Bartlett as Ellen Craig in St. Elsewhere (NBC) (Episode: "Their Town"); Polly Draper as Ellyn Warren in Thirtysomething (ABC) (Episode: "Nice Work If You Can Get It"); Christina Pickles as Nurse Helen Rosenthal in St. Elsewhere (NBC) (Episode: "Down and Out of Beacon Hill"); Susan Ruttan as Roxanne Melman in L.A. Law (NBC) (Episode: "Leaping Lizards")
Outstanding Supporting Actor in a Miniseries or a Special: John Shea as Bill Stern in Baby M (ABC); Dabney Coleman as Gary Skoloff in Baby M (ABC); Anthony Quinn as Socrates Onassis in Onassis: The Richest Man in the World (ABC); Ron Silver as Ron Levin in Billionaire Boys Club (NBC); Bruce Weitz as Rick Whitehead in Baby M (ABC)	Outstanding Supporting Actress in a Miniseries or a Special: Jane Seymour as Maria Callas in Onassis: The Richest Man in the World (ABC); Stockard Channing as Susan Reinert in Echoes in the Darkness (CBS); Ruby Dee as Elizabeth Keckley in Lincoln (NBC); Julie Harris as Alice in The Woman He Loved (CBS); Lisa Jacobs as Anne Frank in The Attic: The Hiding of Anne Frank (CBS)

==== Individual performances ====
Outstanding Individual Performance in a Variety or Music Program
- Robin Williams – ABC Presents a Royal Gala (ABC)
  - Mikhail Baryshnikov – Great Performances: "Celebrating Gershwin" (PBS)
  - Ray Charles – Irving Berlin's 100th Birthday Celebration (CBS)
  - Billy Crystal – An All-Star Toast to the Improv (HBO)
  - Julie Kavner - The Tracey Ullman Show (Fox)

=== Directing ===
Directing
Outstanding Directing in a Comedy Series: Hooperman (ABC): "Pilot" – Gregory Hoblit; Cheers (NBC): "Backseat Becky, Up Front" – James Burrows; The Days and Nights of Molly Dodd (NBC): "Here Comes That Cold Wind Off the River" – Jay Tarses; The Golden Girls (NBC): "Old Friends" – Terry Hughes; It's Garry Shandling's Show (Showtime): "No Baby, No Show" – Alan Rafkin	Outstanding Directing in a Drama Series: St. Elsewhere (NBC): "Weigh In, Way Out" – Mark Tinker; China Beach (ABC): "Pilot" – Rod Holcomb; L.A. Law (NBC): "Beauty and Obese" – Sam Weisman; L.A. Law (NBC): "Full Marital Jacket" – Win Phelps; L.A. Law (NBC): "Handroll Express" – Kim Friedman; L.A. Law (NBC): "The Wizard of Odds" – Gregory Hoblit
Outstanding Directing in a Variety or Music Program: Great Performances (PBS): "Celebrating Gershwin" – Patricia Birch and Humphrey Burton; Irving Berlin's 100th Birthday Celebration (CBS) – Walter C. Miller; Late Night with David Letterman 6th Anniversary Special (NBC) – Hal Gurnee; The Smothers Brothers Comedy Hour 20th Anniversary Reunion (CBS) – David Grossman	Outstanding Directing in a Miniseries or a Special: Lincoln (NBC) – Lamont Johnson; The Attic: The Hiding of Anne Frank (CBS) – John Erman; Billionaire Boys Club (NBC) – Marvin J. Chomsky; Echos in the Darkness (CBS) – Glenn Jordan; The Taking of Flight 847: The Uli Derickson Story (NBC) – Paul Wendkos

=== Writing ===
Writing
Outstanding Writing in a Comedy Series: Frank's Place (CBS): "The Bridge" – Hugh Wilson; Cheers (NBC): "Home Is the Sailor" – Glen Charles and Les Charles; Designing Women (CBS): "Killing All the Right People" – Linda Bloodworth-Thomason; It's Garry Shandling's Show (Showtime): "It's Angelica's Show, Part 2" – Sam Simon, Tom Gammill and Max Pross; It's Garry Shandling's Show (Showtime): "No Baby, No Show" – Alan Zweibel and Garry Shandling; The Wonder Years (ABC): "Pilot" – Neal Marlens and Carol Black	Outstanding Writing in a Drama Series: Thirtysomething (ABC): "Business as Usual" – Paul Haggis and Marshall Herskovitz; Beauty and the Beast (CBS): "Pilot" – Ron Koslow; China Beach (ABC): "Pilot" – John Sacret Young; L.A. Law (NBC): "Beauty and Obese" – Terry Louise Fisher and David E. Kelley; L.A. Law (NBC): "Full Marital Jacket" – Story by : Steven Bochco and Terry Louise Fisher Teleplay by : Terry Louise Fisher and David E. Kelley; St. Elsewhere (NBC): "The Last One" – Story by : Tom Fontana, John Tinker and Channing Gibson Teleplay by : Bruce Paltrow and Mark Tinker
Outstanding Writing in a Variety or Music Program: Jackie Mason on Broadway (HBO) - Jackie Mason; Late Night with David Letterman 6th Anniversary Special (NBC); The Smothers Brothers Comedy Hour 20th Anniversary Reunion (CBS); The Tracey Ullman Show (Fox): "Ginny Redux"	Outstanding Writing in a Miniseries or a Special: The Attic: The Hiding of Anne Frank (CBS) – William Hanley; Baby M (ABC): "Part I" – James Steven Sadwith; Billionaire Boys Club (NBC): "Part I" – Gy Waldron; Foxfire (CBS) – Susan Cooper; The Murder of Mary Phagan (NBC) – Story by : Larry McMurtry Teleplay by : Jeffrey Lane and George Stevens Jr.

== Most major nominations ==
Networks with multiple major nominations (Note: "Major" constitutes the categories listed above: Program, Acting, Directing, and Writing. Does not include the technical categories.)
Network	Number of Nominations
NBC	69
CBS	32
ABC	24

Programs with multiple major nominations
Program	Category	Network	Number of Nominations
L.A. Law	Drama	NBC	15
Cheers	Comedy	NBC	9
Baby M	Miniseries	ABC	6
The Golden Girls	Comedy	NBC	6
St. Elsewhere	Drama	NBC	6
The Attic: The Hiding of Anne Frank	Special	CBS	5
Thirtysomething	Drama	ABC	5
Billionaire Boys Club	Miniseries	NBC	4
Foxfire	Special	CBS	4
Lincoln	Miniseries	NBC	4
Beauty and the Beast	Drama	CBS	3
Frank's Place	Comedy	CBS	3
It's Garry Shandling's Show	Comedy	Showtime	3
Irving Berlin's 100th Birthday Celebration	Variety	CBS	3
Late Night with David Letterman 6th Anniversary Special	Variety	NBC	3
The Murder of Mary Phagan	Miniseries	NBC	3
The Tracey Ullman Show	Variety	Fox	3
The Ann Jillian Story	Special	NBC	2
Cagney & Lacey	Drama	CBS	2
China Beach	Drama	ABC	2
The Days and Nights of Molly Dodd	Comedy	NBC	2
Great Performances: "Celebrating Gershwin"	Variety	PBS	2
Hooperman	Comedy	ABC	2
Inherit the Wind	Special	NBC	2
Irving Berlin's 100th Birthday Celebration	Variety	CBS	2
Newhart	Comedy	CBS	2
Night Court	Comedy	NBC	2
Onassis: The Richest Man in the World	Special	ABC	2
The Smothers Brothers Comedy Hour 20th Anniversary Reunion	Variety	CBS	2
The Taking of Flight 847: The Uli Derickson Story	Special	NBC	2
The Wonder Years	Comedy	ABC	2

== Most major awards ==
Networks with multiple major awards
Network	Number of Awards
NBC	11
ABC	8
CBS	5

Programs with multiple major awards
Program	Category	Network	Number of Awards
Thirtysomething	Drama	ABC	3
The Golden Girls	Comedy	NBC	2
Inherit the Wind	Special	NBC	2
