= George and Leo =

American television sitcom (1997–98)

- Genre: Sitcom
- Created by: Dan Staley & Rob Long
- Written by: Dan Staley; Rob Long; Bob Sand; Betsy Borns; Reid Harrison; Drew Vaupen; Phil Baker; Howard Margulies; Aaron Shure; Tom Anderson; Larry Balmagia
- Directed by: James Burrows; Pamela Fryman; Philip Charles MacKenzie; Brian K. Roberts; Michael Lessac; Peter Baldwin
- Starring: Bob Newhart; Judd Hirsch; Jason Bateman; Bess Meyer; Robyn Lively
- Composer: Christophe Beck
- Country of origin: United States
- Original language: English
- No. of seasons: 1
- No. of episodes: 22

Production
- Executive producers: Dan Staley; Rob Long
- Producers: Tim Berry; Stephen C. Grossman
- Running time: 22 minutes
- Production companies: Staley-Long Productions; Paramount Television

Original release
- Network: CBS
- Release: September 15, 1997 – March 16, 1998

George and Leo is an American television sitcom created by Dan Staley and Rob Long, and starring Bob Newhart and Judd Hirsch. It aired on CBS from September 15, 1997 to March 16, 1998.

== Synopsis ==
Newhart and Hirsch starred as the respective title characters, widely divergent men who become in-laws when their children get married. George's (Newhart) son was played by Jason Bateman. Bess Meyer initially played Leo's (Hirsch) daughter, but was replaced after the first eight episodes by Robyn Lively. The series was set on Martha's Vineyard, where George owned a bookstore.

One episode, "The Cameo Show", featured guest appearances from many of the costars of Newhart's and Hirsch's previous sitcoms: The Bob Newhart Show, Taxi, Newhart, and Dear John. The series was cancelled after 22 episodes. Newhart later averred that the network wanted to renew the show with cast changes and a modified format, but he disagreed on a creative level with the proposed series revamp and declined the opportunity to continue.

== Cast ==
=== Main ===
- Bob Newhart as George Stoody
- Judd Hirsch as Leonard "Leo" Wagonman
- Jason Bateman as Theodore "Ted" Stoody
- Bess Meyer (episodes 1–7) and Robyn Lively (episodes 9–22) as Casey Wagonman
- Darryl Theirse as Ambrose
- Jason Beghe as Ronald "Ron"

=== Guest stars ===
- Veronica Cartwright as Grace
- Dave Coulier as Father Rick
- Judy Geeson as Louise
- Alexondra Lee as Mandy
- Dinah Manoff as Vicki
- Julia Sweeney as Alice
- Dick Martin as Mr. Roberson
- Paul Willson as Michael
- Nora Dunn as Debi

== Episodes ==
No.	Title	Directed by	Written by	Original release date	Prod. code	Viewers (millions)
1	"Pilot"	James Burrows	Dan Staley & Rob Long	September 15, 1997	001	13.78
2	"The Wedding"	Pamela Fryman	Teleplay by : Bob Sand	September 22, 1997	002	12.41
3	"The Bribe"	Philip Charles MacKenzie	Teleplay by : Betsy Borns	September 29, 1997	004	13.11
4	"The Baby-Care Class"	Philip Charles MacKenzie	Teleplay by : Reid Harrison	October 6, 1997	005	10.64
5	"The Job"	Pamela Fryman	Drew Vaupen & Phil Baker	October 13, 1997	003	12.14
6	"The Review"	Brian K. Roberts	Howard Margulies	October 20, 1997	007	11.38
7	"The Halloween Show"	Philip Charles MacKenzie	Bob Sand	October 27, 1997	006	11.27
8	"The Cameo Show"	Michael Lessac	Teleplay by : Aaron Shure	November 3, 1997	008	15.74
9	"The Housekeeper"	Michael Lessac	Teleplay by : Tom Anderson	November 10, 1997	009	11.95
10	"The Witness"	Michael Lessac	Teleplay by : Betsy Borns	November 17, 1997	010	12.51
11	"The Thanksgiving Show"	James Burrows	Bob Sand	November 24, 1997	013	10.78
12	"The Smokers"	Michael Lessac	Reid Harrison	December 8, 1997	011	10.87
13	"The Eggnog"	James Burrows	Teleplay by : Aaron Shure	December 15, 1997	012	10.87
14	"The Other Bookstore"	Michael Lessac	Teleplay by : Reid Harrison	January 5, 1998	015	11.42
15	"The Nine Wives of Leo Wagonman"	Michael Lessac	Teleplay by : Bob Sand	January 12, 1998	016	12.56
16	"The Teacher"	Peter Baldwin	Teleplay by : Aaron Shure	January 19, 1998	014	10.83
17	"The Poker Game"	Michael Lessac	Teleplay by : Howard Margulies	January 26, 1998	017	9.98
18	"The Gift"	Michael Lessac	Teleplay by : Larry Balmagia	February 2, 1998	018	11.66
19	"The Nanny"	Pamela Fryman	Story by : Tom Anderson; Teleplay by : Dan Staley & Rob Long	February 23, 1998	019	12.24
20	"The Massage: Part 1"	Pamela Fryman	Teleplay by : Aaron Shure	March 2, 1998	020	10.80
21	"The Massage: Part 2"	Michael Lessac	Teleplay by : Aaron Shure	March 9, 1998	021	9.61
22	"The Bongos"	Michael Lessac	Teleplay by : Reid Harrison	March 16, 1998	022	9.26
