= Love & Money =

- Genre: Sitcom
- Created by: Rob Long; Dan Staley
- Directed by: Michael Lessac; Pamela Fryman (pilot)
- Starring: Brian Van Holt; Paget Brewster; Brian Doyle-Murray; John Livingston; Judy Greer; Swoosie Kurtz; David Ogden Stiers
- Composer: Bruce Miller
- Country of origin: United States
- Original language: English
- No. of seasons: 1
- No. of episodes: 13 (8 unaired)

Production
- Executive producers: Rob Long; Dan Staley
- Producers: Stephen C. Grossman; Mark Petulla
- Camera setup: Multi-camera
- Running time: 30 minutes
- Production companies: Staley-Long Productions; CBS Productions; Paramount Network Television

Original release
- Network: CBS
- Release: October 8, 1999 – July 18, 2000

Love & Money is an American sitcom television series created by Rob Long and Dan Staley, that aired from CBS on October 8, 1999, to July 18, 2000. Aired and unaired episodes later aired on HDNet.

== Premise ==
On the day of her wedding, the eldest daughter of the wealthy Conklin family, Allison, has misgivings about the marriage's success. She locks herself in the bathroom but tells her family that the door is stuck. Her mother, Effie, calls for the building's superintendent, Eamon McBride, to fix the door. After getting into the bathroom, it's revealed that Eamon and Allison are former lovers, which reignites the dwindling flame of their love. Allison's father, Nicholas, doesn't approve of the relationship and even attempts to bribe Eamon into leaving Allison alone. However, Allison decides to follow her heart, regardless of what her family thinks. The show focuses on the development of the relationship and how the wealthy Conklin family get used to Eamon's father, Finn, who works as the building's doorman. The Conklins live in a mansions occupying the top three floors of the building and the McBrides reside in a small basement apartment.

== Cast ==
- Brian Van Holt as Eamon McBride
- Paget Brewster as Allison Conklin
- Brian Doyle-Murray as Finn McBride
- John Livingston as Nicky Conklin
- Judy Greer as Puff Conklin
- Swoosie Kurtz as Effie Conklin
- David Ogden Stiers as Nicholas Conklin

In a podcast interview with Ken Levine, creator Rob Long indicated that Frank Langella was initially cast as Nicholas Conklin, but was fired after the run-through of the pilot episode over creative differences regarding the character's prominence among the ensemble.

== Episodes ==
With the exception of "Pilot", every episode of the series was directed by Michael Lessac. The pilot instead was directed by Pamela Fryman.

No.	Title	Written by	Original release date	Prod. code
1	"Pilot"	Dan Staley and Rob Long	October 8, 1999	40305-001
A rich girl and the super of her building reunites on her wedding day.
2	"When WASPs Collide"	Daphne Pollon	October 15, 1999	40305-002
Allison tries to bring the concept of "honest discussion" to her family.
3	"Music Box"	Howard Margulies	October 22, 1999	40305-005
The Conklins invite Finn over for cocktails.
4	"Howard's End"	Cindy Collins	July 11, 2000	40305-010
Allison has a fight with Eamon, and Nicholas tries to get Allison and Howard back together.
5	"A Night at the Opera"	Ross Abrash	July 18, 2000	40305-008
Effie takes Finn to the opera.
6	"The Five Week Itch"	F.J. Pratt and Dan Cohen	Unaired	40305-003
Allison takes Eamon out on a cultural date.
7	"Make Room for Daddy"	Phil Baker and Drew Vaupen	Unaired	40305-004
Nicholas collapses due to stress.
8	"The Stepmummy"	Howard Margulies	Unaired	40305-006
Effie's stepmother (Cloris Leachman) comes for a visit.
9	"Career Daze"	Phil Baker and Drew Vaupen	Unaired	40305-007
It's revealed that Eamon never completed high school.
10	"Puff the Magic Sister"	Bob Sand	Unaired	40305-009
Finn finds out that a mysterious man has been breaking into all the apartments.
11	"Diagnosis Effie"	Daphne Pollon	Unaired	40305-011
Effie forces Nicholas to get to know a new couple in the building.
12	"Guess Who's Paying for Dinner"	F.J. Pratt and Dan Cohen	Unaired	40305-012
Eamon invites the Conklins to a Chinese restaurant so they can get to know each other better.
13	"Everybody Doesn't Love Eamon"	Rob Fox and Michael Fitzpatrick	Unaired	40305-013
Eamon runs into a rival who has been mocking him ever since a mistake on the hockey field.
