= The Jeff Foxworthy Show =

American sitcom (1995–1997)

- Genre: Sitcom
- Created by: Tom Anderson
- Starring: Jeff Foxworthy; Anita Barone; Haley Joel Osment; Matt Clark; Matt Borlenghi; Ann Cusack; G. W. Bailey; Bill Engvall; Jeanine Jackson; Jonathan Lipnicki
- Composer: Craig Stuart Garfinkle
- Country of origin: United States
- Original language: English
- No. of seasons: 2
- No. of episodes: 41 (1 unaired)

Production
- Executive producers: Tom Anderson; Brad Grey; Bernie Brillstein; Howard Michael Gould; Maxine Lapiduss; Jeff Foxworthy (season 2)
- Producers: Steven Schott; Mark Brull; David Castro; Jeff Foxworthy (season 1)
- Editors: Tony Porter; Richard Candib; Marco Zappia (pilot only)
- Camera setup: Videotape; Multi-camera (1995–1996); Film; Multi-camera (1996–1997)
- Running time: 30 minutes
- Production companies: Brillstein-Grey Communications; Mr. Willoughby, Inc.; TriStar Television (1995–1996) (season 1); Columbia Pictures Television (1996–1997) (season 2)

Original release
- Network: ABC
- Release: September 12, 1995 – May 15, 1996
- Network: NBC
- Release: September 23, 1996 – May 5, 1997

The Jeff Foxworthy Show is an American sitcom television series created by Tom Anderson, starring comedian Jeff Foxworthy and based on Foxworthy's stand-up comedy routine. The series originally aired on ABC from September 12, 1995, to May 15, 1996, and then on NBC from September 23, 1996, to May 5, 1997.

== History ==
=== ABC era ===
The first series aired on ABC during the 1995–1996 season, but was cancelled after one season. NBC picked up the show for the following season, but despite improving in the ratings, it was again cancelled after one season. In the first season, network executives considered his routine "too Southern" for a national network and based his sitcom in Bloomington, Indiana.

Jay Mohr and Bob Saget made regular or cameo appearances, as did country singers Tim McGraw and Travis Tritt.

==== Cast ====
- Jeff Foxworthy as Himself
- Anita Barone as Karen Foxworthy (1995–1996)
- Haley Joel Osment as Matt Foxworthy
- Matt Clark as Walt Bacon (1995–1996)
- Matt Borlenghi as Russ Francis (1995–1996)
- Dakin Matthews as Elliot (1995–1996)
- Bibi Besch as Lois (1995–1996)
- Debra Jo Rupp as Gayle (1995–1996)
- Jay Mohr as Wayne Foxworthy (1996)
- Michelle Clunie as DeeDee Landrow (1996)
- Sue Murphy as Sandi (1995)
- Steve Hytner as Craig Lesko (1995)

=== NBC era ===
When the show moved to NBC, in addition to the casting changes, the show's production changed. In the first series, the show was recorded on tape; the second season was shot on film. In the second season, the show was set in the fictitious town of Briarton in Calhoun County, Georgia, based on Foxworthy's real-life hometown in the South, and the series was given a redesigned opening and theme.

Haley Joel Osment was the only other actor besides Foxworthy to make the move to NBC with the series, and Jeff's wife Karen was the only character that carried over with Jeff and Matt, though the role was filled by a new actress. Jonathan Lipnicki was added to the cast as the Foxworthys' other son Justin.

==== Cast ====
- Jeff Foxworthy as Himself
- Ann Cusack as Karen Foxworthy (1996–1997)
- Haley Joel Osment as Matt Foxworthy
- G. W. Bailey as Big Jim Foxworthy (1996–1997)
- Bill Engvall as Bill Pelton (1996–1997)
- Jeanine Jackson as Livie Ann Pitts (1996)
- Jonathan William Lipnicki as Justin Foxworthy (1996–1997)
- Neil Giuntoli as Florus Workman (1996–1997)
- Kathryn Zaremba as Nettie (1996–1997)
- Candy Trubucco as Candy Conklin (1996–1997)
- Dave Powledge as Ebb Conklin (1996)
- Paula Sorge as Betty Pelton (1996–1997)
- Darryl Theirse as Andre Tucsan (1997)
- Fred Applegate as Ernie Binderman (1997)
- Kevin Crowley as Trey (1997)

== Episodes ==
=== Series overview ===
Season	Episodes	Originally released		
Season	Episodes	First released	Last released	Network
1	18	September 12, 1995	May 15, 1996	ABC
2	23	September 23, 1996	May 5, 1997	NBC

=== Season 1 (1995–96) ===
No. overall	No. in season	Title	Directed by	Written by	Original release date	Viewers (millions)
1	1	"Jeff's Life 101"	Alan Rafkin	Tom Anderson	September 12, 1995	24.2
2	2	"A Non-Affair to Remember"	Alan Rafkin	David Castro	September 16, 1995	12.8
3	3	"The Gene Pool"	Alan Rafkin	Bill Kunstler	September 23, 1995	11.7
4	4	"Elliot and Victoria's Secret"	Stan Lathan	Kathy Ann Stumpe	September 30, 1995	11.5
5	5	"Womb With a View"	Stan Lathan	Tom Seeley & Norm Gunzenhauser	October 14, 1995	10.6
6	6	"With Two You Get Cow's Milk"	Alan Rafkin	Susan Sebastian & Jennie Ayers	October 28, 1995	9.3
7	7	"Jeff & Ray & Rascal's Big Adventure"	Alan Rafkin	Susan Sebastian & Jennie Ayers	November 4, 1995	12.0
8	8	"A Sore Winner"	Alan Rafkin	Ricky Blitt	November 11, 1995	13.0
9	9	"He's Making a List, Checking It Twice"	Alan Rafkin	David Castro	November 25, 1995	10.0
10	10	"Foxworthy Family Feud"	Alan Rafkin	Kathy Ann Stumpe	December 16, 1995	8.7
11	11	"Matt About You"	Alan Rafkin	Andrew Gordon & Eileen Conn	December 23, 1995	10.5
12	12	"Clan of the Bare Caves"	Gil Junger	Kathy Ann Stumpe	January 6, 1996	11.5
13	13	"Before You Say `No,' Just Hear Me Out"	Gil Junger	Tom Anderson and Jeff Foxworthy	January 13, 1996	10.1
14	14	"Deedee Day"	Howard Murray	David Castro	January 20, 1996	11.2
15	15	"He Ain't Heavy, He's a Bully"	Howard Murray	Norm Gunzenhauser & Tom Seeley	January 24, 1996	19.9
16	16	"Moonstruck"	Gil Junger	Susan Sebastian & Jennie Ayers	February 3, 1996	N/A
17	17	"Shootout at the Comedy Corral"	Art Dielhenn	David Castro	Unaired	N/A
18	18	"One Wedding and a Baby"	Art Dielhenn	Tom Anderson and Jeff Foxworthy	May 15, 1996	14.8

=== Season 2 (1996–97) ===
No. overall	No. in season	Title	Directed by	Written by	Original release date	Viewers (millions)
19	1	"Where the Donuts Are Good. Not Great"	Linda Day	Maxine Lapiduss	September 23, 1996	13.8
20	2	"The List Is Strife"	Linda Day	Tom Anderson	September 30, 1996	11.0
21	3	"The Poor Sportsmen of the Apocalypse"	Ted Wass	Jack Amiel & Michael Begler	October 7, 1996	13.9
22	4	"My Dinner With Betty"	Andrew Tsao	John Pardee & Joey Murphy	October 14, 1996	12.2
23	5	"The Gift"	Linda Day	Story by : Jennie Ayers & Susan Sebastian; Teleplay by : Katie Ford	October 21, 1996	12.0
24	6	"The Practical Joke"	Ted Wass	David Garrett & Jason Ward	October 28, 1996	12.4
25	7	"Puppy Love Triangle"	Ted Wass	Robert Peacock	November 11, 1996	13.0
26	8	"Like Florus, Like Son"	Ted Wass	Katie Ford	November 18, 1996	12.0
27	9	"Thanksgiving"	Ted Wass	John Pardee & Joey Murphy	November 25, 1996	12.8
28	10	"Merry Christmas, Y'all"	Andrew Tsao	Story by : Russ Woody & Howard M. Gould; Teleplay by : Susan Sebastian, Jennie Ayers & Robert Peacock	December 16, 1996	11.2
29	11	"Feud for Thought"	Andrew Tsao	Story by : David Garrett & Jason Ward; Teleplay by : Jack Amiel & Michael Begler and Ritch Shydner	January 6, 1997	13.80
30	12	"You Can't Teach a Dead Dog New Tricks"	Ted Wass	Jack Amiel & Michael Begler	January 13, 1997	12.27
31	13	"The Briarton Syndrome"	Ted Wass	Story by : Russ Woody; Teleplay by : Jeff Foxworthy & Howard M. Gould	January 20, 1997	11.78
32	14	"Jeff, You the Man"	Jonathan Weiss	Jennie Ayers & Susan Sebastian	February 3, 1997	10.53
33	15	"Big Dogs"	Patrick Maloney	Story by : Jennie Ayers & Susan Sebastian; Teleplay by : Ritch Shydner & Robert Peacock	February 17, 1997	11.84
34	16	"Foxworthy Shall Rise Again"	Ted Wass	Ritch Shydner	March 3, 1997	10.71
35	17	"Gone Fishin'"	Ted Wass	Glenn Gers	March 10, 1997	10.94
36	18	"Mooseface Loves Nuzzles"	Patrick Maloney	Dan Wilcox	March 17, 1997	11.90
37	19	"The Good, the Bad, and the Hairless"	Lex Passaris	Dan Wilcox	April 7, 1997	10.91
38	20	"Real Men"	Ted Wass	Russ Woody	April 14, 1997	9.41
39	21	"Wrestling Opera"	Ted Wass	Susan Dickes	April 28, 1997	10.51
40	22	"Twister of Fate"	Ted Wass	Russ Woody	May 5, 1997	10.01
41	23	"Field of Schemes"	Ted Wass	Ritch Shydner & Robert Peacock	May 5, 1997	11.81

== Broadcast ==
Reruns aired on the USA Network from January 14, 2000, to August 4, 2001. In 2005, Nick@Nite began airing the show. It was removed from the lineup a few years later. In 2012, TBS began airing the show on Saturday mornings from 5 to 5:30 am.

In early October 2016, the sitcom came back to TV twice over: first on INSP Friday nights 10p-12a PT/1a-3a ET starting with season 2 on October 7. Then season 1 started broadcasting on Tuesday, October 11 on GetTV 5p-6:30p PT/8p-9:30p ET with repeats the following Friday night/Saturday morning at 1a PT/4a ET until 2019, and from 2020 to 2022, the show aired on Circle. The show debuted on Cozi TV on January 3, 2026, airing Fridays-Sundays from 12a-2a ET.

== Home media ==
Sony Pictures Home Entertainment released the complete series on DVD between 2004 and 2009.

On August 27, 2013, it was announced that Minnesota-based Mill Creek Entertainment had acquired the home media distribution rights to various television series from the Sony Pictures Television library including The Jeff Foxworthy Show. On August 18, 2015, they re-released both seasons on DVD in a 4-disc complete series set.

DVD name	Ep#	Release date
The Complete 1st Season	18	July 27, 2004
The Complete 2nd and Final Season	23	May 12, 2009
The Complete Series	41	August 18, 2015

=== Streaming ===
The series was formerly available on Pure Flix Entertainment's streaming service (later acquired by the show's distributor, Sony Pictures in 2021). The series is also available on Crackle and Tubi in the United States and the CTV Television Network's streaming service, CTV Throwback in Canada. As of 2021, both seasons were formerly available on NBC's streaming service, Peacock.
