= The Show Where Sam Shows Up =

- Frasier episode
- Episode no.: Season 2 Episode 16
- Directed by: James Burrows
- Written by: Ken Levine; David Isaacs
- Original air date: February 21, 1995

Guest appearances
- Ted Danson as Sam Malone (special guest star); Téa Leoni as Sheila

Episode chronology
← Previous "You Scratch My Book..."	Next → "Daphne's Room"
- Frasier (season 2)

"The Show Where Sam Shows Up" is the 16th episode of the second season of the American sitcom Frasier. This episode originally aired on February 21, 1995, on NBC, intended as part of a February ratings sweep by the network. It features a special guest appearance by Ted Danson as Sam Malone, a recovering sex addict, bartender and ex-baseball player. In this episode, Sam arrives in Seattle to see his old friend Frasier and is then introduced to Frasier's family at a dinner in Frasier's home, where the inconsistencies about Martin's supposed "death" are cleared up. Danson's appearance in this episode has received mixed reviews, and the positive highlight about it is his interaction with the cast of Frasier.

== Plot ==
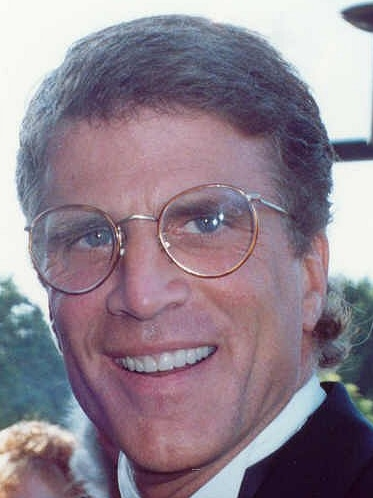
Ted Danson guest stars as Cheers character Sam Malone.

=== Act One ===
Bartender and ex-baseball player Sam Malone (Ted Danson) from Cheers arrives in Seattle to see his psychiatrist friend Frasier Crane at the KACL-AM radio station, and then Frasier becomes so happy and overjoyed by his old friend's arrival that he almost ruins the segment of his show. According to Sam, after the 1993 Cheers finale, "One for the Road," the characters' lives have radically changed since Frasier left Boston. Former bar manager of Cheers, Rebecca Howe, was dumped by her plumber husband Don Santry, who became rich after a successful plumbing invention, and then she became despondent and settled her life back at the bar without intent to work there again. After his term in the Boston city council was over, Woody Boyd became a bartender again and he and his wife, Kelly Gaines-Boyd, have a son who against all odds is smart. Bar regular and postman Cliff Clavin still lives with his mother, stopped attending the bar, and has not left home after he read information about a flesh-eating bacteria.

=== "Martin Rises from the Dead" ===
Then Frasier brings Sam home for dinner and introduces him to his family: his father Martin (John Mahoney) (Note: Coincidentally, John Mahoney portrayed a failing jingle pianist and singer, Sy Flembeck, in the Cheers episode, "Do Not Forsake Me, O' My Postman" (1992). In that episode, Sam Malone is frustrated Sy's talents is driving away bar customers.) who is an ex-cop and a baseball fan of Sam Malone, his brother Niles (David Hyde Pierce) who is also a psychiatrist, and his housekeeper Daphne Moon (Jane Leeves). During the family introduction, Sam explains that, as mentioned in Cheers, Frasier's father was supposed to be a dead scientist and that Frasier is supposed to be the only child, much to the dismay of Frasier's family. (Note: Writers of this episode, Ken Levine and David Isaacs, cleared up inconsistencies between a tale of Frasier's father as a dead scientist from the show Cheers and actualization of Frasier's dad, Martin, as a disabled ex-cop in Frasier.) Frasier explains the inconsistency, indicating that he had had an ugly argument with Martin at the time, which motivated him into making up the "dead scientist father" story.

Daphne is charmed when Sam flirts with her, which enrages Niles. Frasier tells Niles that Sam has a sexual addiction and assures Niles that Sam still attends group meetings for sex addicts, recommended by Frasier in the Cheers episode "The Guy Can't Help It" (1993).

After the family gathering, Frasier and Sam are alone in the living room. Sam tells Frasier that he left his fiancée Sheila, with whom Sam has had a relationship for six months, at the wedding altar the previous day. Frasier assures Sam that he has wedding jitters and that he is ready to leave his old empty sex life behind in favor of a committed relationship. Frasier advises him to continue this relationship and to be always honest to her, especially about leaving her at the altar.

=== "A Dirty Little Secret" ===
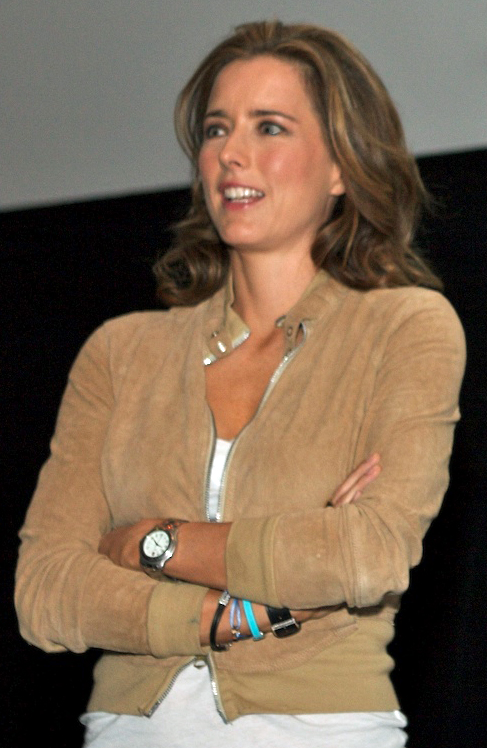
Téa Leoni guest stars as Sam's fiancée Sheila.

At the café, Sam introduces his fiancée Sheila (Téa Leoni) to Frasier, who is horrified to recognize her as a woman he slept with three months ago. Then Frasier goes to the hotel room, where she and Sam are staying. Sheila explains that she is also a sex addict, like Sam, and that Sam and she met for the first time at a group meeting. Frasier begs her not to tell Sam about their short-time affair. Suddenly, Sam arrives into the room and then, in order to be honest to her, confesses to Sheila that, on the day of their engagement, Sam slept with another woman twice. Then Sheila confesses that she slept with two regular patrons: Paul ("short, bald, fat") and then Cliff Clavin. Though he forgives her dalliance with Paul, Sam is disgusted to learn about Cliff and breaks off his relationship with Sheila. (When she turns to Frasier for help, he is equally disgusted about Cliff.)

At Frasier's car, Sam, to Frasier's relief, still does not find out about Frasier's fling with Sheila, yet Sam is still bothered that she and Cliff had a fling, and is relieved to go back to Boston. Frasier assures Sam that Sam has proven himself to be competent for a "meaningful" committed relationship, even if Sheila is "not the one." However, Sam considers pursuing a cocktail waitress at an airport bar, disappointing Frasier.

== Reception ==
This episode originally aired on NBC on Tuesday, February 21, 1995, at 9:00 pm (Eastern) / 8:00 pm (Central) as part of the February ratings sweep, rivaling against ABC's Home Improvement, CBS's television movie Falling for You, and Fox's broadcast of the 1992 film Housesitter, and landed on No. 6 with an 18.8 rating and a 27 share. (Note: Ratings from 1994–95 are based on 95.4 million households with at least one television set.)

Mike Drew from Milwaukee Journal Sentinel rated this episode three and a half stars out of four and praised Cheers character Sam Malone's guest appearance in this episode, even if he disdained Sam's sexual escapades. John Martin, a syndicate writer from The New York Times, found Sam's interaction with characters of Frasier brilliant, especially Daphne Moon. Ginny Holbert from Chicago Sun-Times rated this episode, three and a half stars out of four, as well, and called it a must for Cheers fans and trivia buffs who wanted inconsistencies of Frasier's family background "[cleared] up". Dusty Saunders from Rocky Mountain News was marveled by the comparison between "the macho Sam and the unathletic Niles" and presented blend of "the macho, rakish spirit of Cheers and the neurotic, off-the-wall style of Frasier." Rick Kushman from The Sacramento Bee praised a reunion between two friends, Sam Malone and Frasier Crane, even when they are different from each other.

On the other hand, Donna Callea from The Daytona Beach News-Journal found this episode disappointing, called Ted Danson's guest reprisal as Sam Malone a ratings ploy, considered Danson's performance apathetic and uncomforting, and saw a reunion between Sam and Frasier Crane not well-executed. Frazier Moore from The Associated Press called Sam's appearance a ratings ploy as well, but a must-see for a Cheers fan and any other viewer who lacks interest on the show Frasier. Elaine Liner from Corpus Christi Caller-Times found Sam Malone "sheepish" in this episode. Scott D. Pierce from Deseret News found this episode not as good as previous Frasier episodes that featured Frasier's ex-wife, Lilith Sternin (Bebe Neuwirth), Sam "old and [tiring]" in Frasier, and Danson's performance "lethargic", but Pierce found some of its moments funny, especially from "fresh" Niles. Reviews from Frasier Online, a fan dedication website for the show Frasier, were mixed. Some liked Sam's interaction with Frasier's family but found a romantic story and its scenes between Ted Danson and Téa Leoni poorly executed. One found Cheers references not suitable for viewers not familiar with the show's predecessor Cheers, especially ones used for humor.
