= Rebecca Howe =

Fictional character in the series Cheers

- Cheers character
- Rebecca exclaiming, "I'm Doin' It, Babe!", in "Don't Paint Your Chickens" (season 7, episode 15)
- First appearance: "Home is the Sailor" (season 6, episode 1)
- Last appearance: "One for the Road" (season 11, episode 25)
- Created by: Glen and Les Charles
- Portrayed by: Kirstie Alley

In-universe information
- Gender: Female
- Occupation: Bar manager and waitress
- Family: Captain Franklin Howe (father); Susan Howe (sister); Rebecca (aunt)
- Spouses: Don Santry (ex-husband)

Rebecca Howe is a fictional character of the American television sitcom Cheers, portrayed by Kirstie Alley and created by Glen and Les Charles. Rebecca appeared in 147 episodes of Cheers between 1987 and 1993 and in one episode of Wings. She debuts in the season six episode "Home Is the Sailor" after Shelley Long—who played waitress Diane Chambers—left the show to pursue a movie career. Much of the show's humor in previous seasons had been based around the interaction and sexual tension between the womanizing, working-class main character, bartender Sam Malone, and the high-class, snobbish Diane. Rebecca was intended to fill the gap as Sam's new female foil.

After Sam sells the bar to a corporation, the audience learns Rebecca is the new manager of Cheers. She spars with Sam and frequently rejects his advances. She gradually becomes neurotic and falls in love with almost every rich man in Boston. With the exception of the late Nicholas Colasanto, Alley was the only Cheers regular cast member who never reprised her role in the spin-off series Frasier, even when her character Rebecca is briefly mentioned in the episode, "The Show Where Sam Shows Up".

For her performance as Rebecca, Alley won a Golden Globe Award in 1991 as the Best Actress in a Comedy or Musical Series and an Emmy Award in 1991 as an Outstanding Lead Actress in a Comedy Series.

== Role ==
Rebecca Howe is first seen at Cheers as the manager assigned by the bar's new corporate franchise owner, the Lillian Corporation. Elements of her back story are revealed over several years. She was born in San Diego, one of four children. Rebecca's father (Robert Prosky) is an ex-Navy man and her mother was a concert cellist. Rebecca's sister Susan (Marcia Cross) is an actress and former Miss San Diego who has stolen her past boyfriends. Revealed in "The Last Angry Mailman" (1987), Rebecca was nicknamed "Backseat Becky" for her behavior as a party girl while at the University of Connecticut. In her early appearances, Rebecca appears as a confident, cool and collected businesswoman. Her behavior slowly becomes neurotic as the series progresses and her competent and driven façade crumbles away entirely by the series' end.

=== Storylines ===
We thought of the part as a martinet, a bitch. Then we met [Alley] and there was this vulnerability, so we made her the neurotic woman of the [1980s].

— — James Burrows

When she first meets bartender and ladies' man Sam Malone (Ted Danson), Rebecca's reaction to him is negative. Sam often tries to seduce her; in her first couple (or few) years at Cheers she always rejects his advances. In the sixth season (her debut season), Rebecca has a crush on her boss, Evan Drake (Tom Skerritt). Throughout the season she tries unsuccessfully to make Evan notice her until, toward the end of the season, Evan departs for Japan and is found to have a lover, so Rebecca is forced to let him go. In the seventh season, after Evan's departure, his replacement fires Rebecca and promotes Sam to manager. Rebecca does occasional waitressing and eventually gets her job back. In the eighth season, she dates millionaire Robin Colcord (Roger Rees), but Sam discovers that he intends to secretly retrieve information from Rebecca's computer to facilitate a corporate takeover, leading to their breakup. Rebecca finally falls for Sam after he saves her from Robin's scheme, and after three years of suppressed attraction the two have sex in the Cheers office, leaving it wrecked. Rebecca later confessed to Sam it was one of the most powerful moments in her life. However, the affair is short-lived because Sam becomes complacent about it.

In the ninth season, Robin—now a wanted white-collar criminal—surrenders himself to the police and confesses his love for Rebecca. Meanwhile, Sam recovers his ownership of the bar just after the Lillian Corporation fires Rebecca. Sam rehires her as manager. Robin proposes matrimony to Rebecca after he is released from jail, and she accepts. In "The Days of Wine and Neuroses" (1991), Rebecca becomes drunk and confesses that she is questioning her feelings for Robin now that he has lost much of his fortune. In the following episode "Wedding Bell Blues" (1991), Rebecca jilts Robin at their wedding and tells him, "I only loved you for your money!" Robin leaves her, retrieving a stash of $6 million hidden in the bar office under Rebecca's desk. Later in the season, Rebecca decides to buy Cheers for herself after John Allen Hill becomes the new owner of the restaurant upstairs. John also owns the bar's back room. Using money from her father, Rebecca helps Sam buy the back room of Cheers, and the two co-own the bar.

During the first half of the tenth season, Sam and Rebecca try to conceive a child, but they realize they have no feelings for each other and then decide to stay friends (the arc was originally to write in Alley's pregnancy, but was scrapped when she miscarried). Towards the end of the show, Rebecca does little work, often mentioned by Carla Tortelli (Rhea Perlman). In the eleventh and final season, Rebecca's cigarette causes an enormous fire at Cheers, and she remorsefully uses her life savings to repair the bar. In "Look Before You Sleep" (1993), she is revealed to be the building superintendent of her apartment complex. In the penultimate episode "The Guy Can't Help It" (1993), Rebecca initially rejects the advances of plumber Don Santry (Tom Berenger), but Frasier orders her to give Don another chance. For weeks Rebecca and Don date each other. Sam tries to convince her that she is making a big mistake with Don. In the series finale, she marries Don and resigns from Cheers to devote more time to her husband and to start a family. At first she regrets the marriage, but when Don later works for the Boston sewer department, she becomes happier with it.

Alley appeared as Rebecca briefly in a fourth-season episode of Wings titled "I Love Brian". In the episode of the Cheers spin-off series Frasier called "The Show Where Sam Shows Up", Sam visits Frasier and tells him that Don left Rebecca after he made a fortune on a plumbing-related invention, and Rebecca was "back at the bar". When Frasier asks whether Sam means she is working at Cheers again, Sam replies, "No, she's just back at the bar." Alley opted not to appear on an episode of Frasier due to the sitcom being centered on two psychiatrists, which conflicted with her Scientology beliefs.

== Creation and casting ==
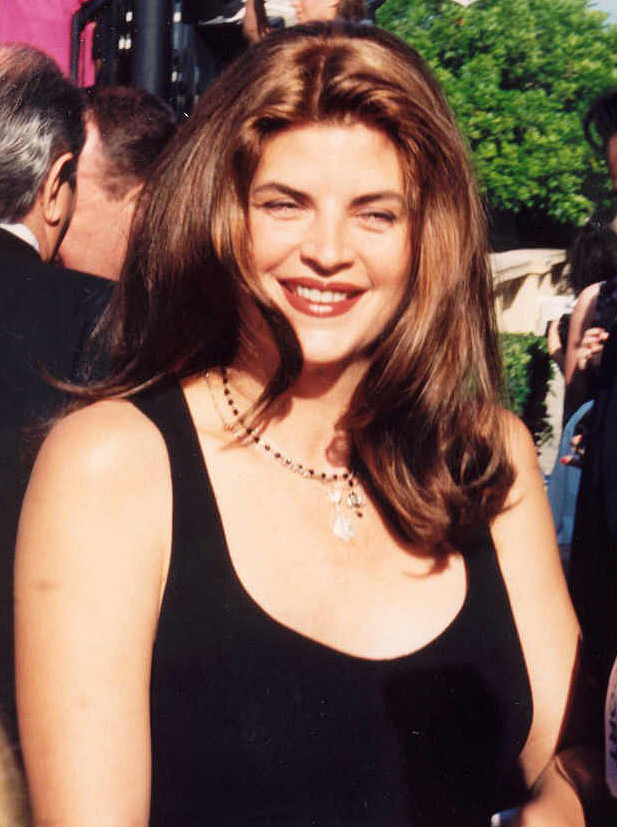
Kirstie Alley debuted as Rebecca Howe in 1987 after Shelley Long left the show as Diane Chambers.

When Shelley Long decided to leave the show in 1987, ending the five-year Sam and Diane storyline, the creators wanted a new female lead and decided that she would not have blonde hair, would not resemble Long, and would be unknown to television viewers. Kirstie Alley, one of the first actresses to audition for the role of Rebecca Howe, was championed by casting director Jeff Greenberg and seemed to be the ideal choice. Other actresses who auditioned for Rebecca included Sharon Stone, Marg Helgenberger, and Kim Cattrall. Although Alley met all the criteria, the producers continued auditioning actresses for the part but none improved on Alley's portrayal of the character. The main reservation on the part of the network and producers was whether Alley would be funny enough to play the role, since she had a dramatic acting background rather than one in comedy. Greenberg continued to advocate for her, and the Charles brothers were able to watch a clip from a comedy Alley had just completed, Summer School, and consult the director Carl Reiner, to judge Alley's comic skills. Reiner praised Alley and assured Glen and Les Charles that she was the right choice.

According to Cheers' co-creator and executive producer James Burrows, Diane Chambers, Rebecca Howe's predecessor, was conceived as an executive businesswoman. Eventually, Diane evolved into a pretentious, college-educated waitress. After Long's departure, the producers created Rebecca Howe as the businesswoman.

Despite concerns about losing Long, ratings rose after Alley's debut. Rebecca began as a martinet and a "smart, tough businesswoman". However, the writers were not thrilled with the character and did not find her funny. Writer Ken Levine said, "In one episode though, she had to fall apart for some reason and was hysterical. We realized that the more neurotic, insecure, and sexually frustrated she was—the funnier she was. So the character evolved in that direction."

Rebecca has made a lot of mistakes in the corporate structure. She's going to be fired by the corporation, unless she handles Sam's bar correctly. She's not a ditz, but she has a neurotic side. She's volatile and eccentric, so when she loses it emotionally, she really loses it. She's either strong and in control or way out there.

— Kirstie Alley, Lawrence Journal-World, 1987

== Reception ==
=== Popularity ===
According to a telephone survey of 1,011 people by the Times Mirror Center for the People and the Press (now Pew Research Center) conducted on April 1–4, 1993, Sam Malone was a favorite of 26% and Rebecca was a favorite by 6%. Twenty-one percent said Sam should marry Diane Chambers, 19% said he should marry Rebecca, 48% wanted him to stay single, and 12% had "no opinion" on this matter. When asked which character should be spun off, 15% voted for Sam, 12% voted for Woody Boyd (Woody Harrelson), 10% voted for Norm Peterson (George Wendt), and 29% voted no spin-offs. 2% of those questioned said Frasier Crane (Kelsey Grammer)—whose own spin-off Frasier debuted in September 1993—should have his own show.

According to a 1993 article from People magazine, newspaper columnist Mike Royko chose Diane to marry Sam, novelist Jackie Collins picked Rebecca, actress Zsa Zsa Gabor chose both as Sam's potential partners. Tennis player Martina Navratilova found Sam too good for either of them. Novelist and archaeologist Clive Cussler said Carla Tortelli (Rhea Perlman) was "Sam's best bet."

=== Critical reaction ===
A syndicated television columnist from Chicago in 1989 said that in her second season on the show, Rebecca was "nothing more than an annoying presence on a program otherwise populated with lovable wackos". Bill Carter of The New York Times in April 1990 said Rebecca was "hard-on-the-outside-mush-on-the-inside". J.D. Reed of People magazine in October 1990 called her a "neurotic overachiever". Rick Marin of The Washington Times in November 1990 praised Kirstie Alley for bringing life into Rebecca Howe and making Rebecca a sympathetic "loser" who is full of ideals but lacks success, and her bringing more physical comedy than Shelley Long did. Steve Craig from the University of North Texas in 1993 considered Rebecca a parody of femininity for rejecting Sam's advances and attempting to marry a tycoon. Columnist Faye Zuckerman in 1991 praised Rebecca's "broad range of talents" as a character.

Bill Simmons, who wrote for ESPN in 2002, considered her one of his two least favorite characters, along with Lilith Sternin. In 2006, Lance Mannion in his Typepad blog said Rebecca wanted to be "part of a world the gang at Cheers could never join. To be part of the gang, she would have to give up her too high opinion of herself, just as Diane had to." Mannion praised Kirstie Alley for physical comedy and her comical scenes with Ted Danson in the series. Josh Robertson of Complex website in 2013 included Rebecca and Sam at number 13 on his list of "The 25 Most Sexual Sitcom Couples of All", said Rebecca "may not have been as good for the comedy on Cheers, but she was way more attractive than Diane". Screen Rant critic Simone Torn in 2019 wrote that Rebecca's transformation from "a smart, goal-oriented businesswoman" to "a poorly-written woman who only cared about frivolous matters" has been one of "[ten] things from Cheers that have not aged well." Torn further wrote that Rebecca "became a gold-digger and an active complainer who was more cartoonish in nature[.]"

This role earned Kirstie Alley a Golden Globe Award in 1991 as the Best Actress in a Comedy or Musical Series. It also earned her an Emmy Award in 1991 as an Outstanding Lead Actress in a Comedy Series.

== Notes ==
=== References ===
- Craig, Steve. "Selling Masculinities, Selling Femininities: Multiple Genders and the Economics of Television." The Mid-Atlantic Almanack 2 (1993): 15–27. Internet Archive Wayback Machine. 1–21. Web. January 14, 2011.
- Harmetz, Alijean. "Changes on tap at `Cheers'." The Ledger [Lakeland, FL] September 23, 1987: 1C+. Google News. Web. January 27, 2012. Original The New York Times article
