= Dan Staley =

American screenwriter

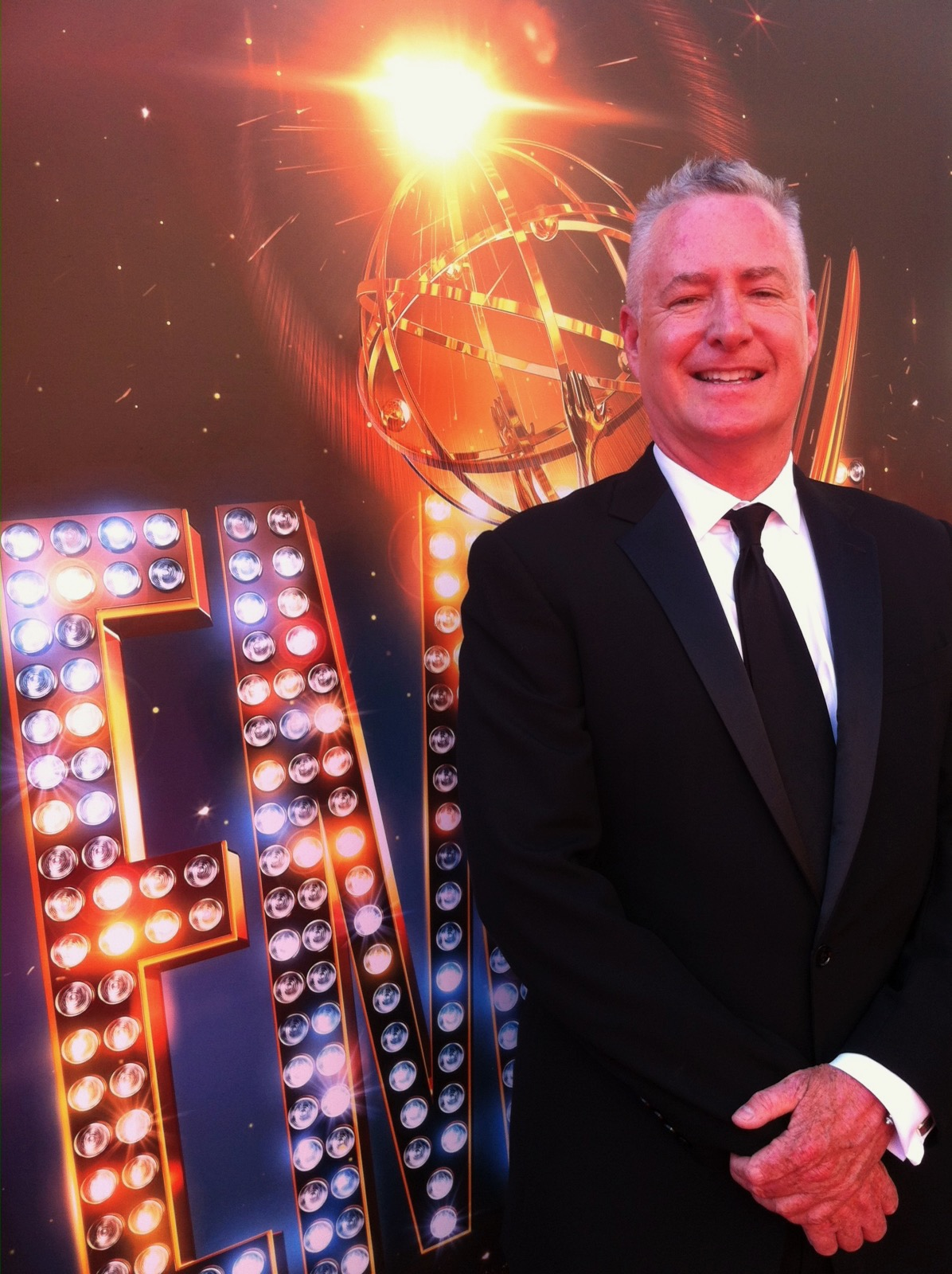
- Staley in 2014.
- Born: February 3, 1963 (age 62); Manhattan Beach, California, United States
- Occupation(s): Television producer, television writer
- Years active: 1990–present

Dan Staley is an American screenwriter and television producer.

Staley began his career in advertising, working as a copywriter at J. Walter Thompson and David Deutsch Associates, now Deutsch Inc. In his five years in advertising, he won the Clio and One Show Gold, the highest creative awards in the advertising industry.

Staley began writing for television in 1990. With former writing partner Rob Long, he worked on the final four seasons of NBC's Cheers. Staley & Long wrote 14 episodes of Cheers and eventually rose to be co-executive producers for the show's final season (1992–93). The team went on to create numerous pilots and series for Paramount's Network Television division, including Pig Sty, Good Company, George and Leo, Love & Money and Men, Women & Dogs. Staley began writing on his own in 2008; his first solo credit was an episode of the hit U.K. sitcom My Family (BBC) in 2010. Staley went on to be executive producer and showrunner of Disney Channel's Good Luck Charlie, which ended its 100-episode run in 2014. From 2017 to 2018, Staley was on the writing staff of Kevin Can Wait (CBS).

Staley has been nominated for the Emmy award five times: in 1992, 1993, 2012, 2013 and 2014. In 2013, he was nominated for a PGA award for Outstanding Children's Program. In 2015, he was nominated for a GLAAD award for Outstanding Individual Episode for the Good Luck Charlie episode "Down a Tree” (the first episode of children's TV to feature same-sex parents).

Born and raised in Southern California, Staley is a 1985 graduate of Yale University. He currently divides his time between Los Angeles and Palm Springs, California.
