= Frasier Crane =

Fictional character in the television series Frasier and Cheers

Dr. Frasier Crane, MD
- Cheers / Frasier / Frasier (2023) character
- Dr. Frasier Crane doing his radio show at KACL in the Frasier episode "Shrink Wrap" (1995)
- First appearance: Cheers: "Rebound (Part 1)" (episode 3.01)
- Last appearance: Frasier (2023): "Father Christmas" (episode 02.20)
- Created by: Glen Charles; Les Charles
- Portrayed by: Kelsey Grammer

In-universe information
- Nicknames: Doc, Fras
- Gender: Male
- Occupation: Psychiatrist (1983–1993); Radio host and psychotherapist (1993–2004); TV host and psychotherapist (For 14–15 years); Harvard professor (2023); Apartment owner (2023)
- Family: Martin Crane (father; deceased); Hester Crane (mother; deceased); Niles Crane (younger brother); Ronee Lawrence (stepmother)
- Spouses: Nanette "Nanny G" Guzman (before 1984); Lilith Sternin (1988–1993)
- Significant other: Charlotte Connor (2003–2023)
- Children: Frederick Crane (b. 1989; son, with Lilith)
- Relatives: Walt Crane (paternal uncle); Zora Crane (paternal aunt); Nikos Crane (paternal cousin); David Crane (nephew); Maris Crane (ex-sister-in-law); Daphne Moon (sister-in-law)
- Religion: Episcopalian
- Nationality: American

Dr. Frasier Winslow Crane (born c. 1952) (Note: Various episodes like "The Late Dr. Crane" and "Back Talk" (both 1999) inconsistently claim different dates as Frasier's exact birth date. A book by Dennis A. Bjorklund verifies just his birth year as 1952.) is a fictional character who is both a supporting character on the American television sitcom Cheers and the titular protagonist of its spin-off Frasier and the latter's 2023 sequel. In all three series, he is portrayed by Kelsey Grammer. The character debuted in the Cheers third-season premiere, "Rebound (Part 1)" (1984), as Diane Chambers's love interest, part of the Sam and Diane story arc. Intended to appear for only a few episodes, Grammer's performance in the role was praised by producers, prompting them to expand his role and increase his prominence.

Later in Cheers, Frasier marries Lilith Sternin (Bebe Neuwirth) and has a son, Frederick. After Cheers ended, the character moved to a spin-off series, Frasier, through which the span of his overall television appearances totals twenty years. In the spin-off, Frasier moves back to his birthplace, Seattle, after his divorce from Lilith, who retained custody of Frederick in Boston, and is reunited with a newly created family: his estranged father, Martin, and brother, Niles. In February 2021, ViacomCBS (now Paramount Global) announced that Grammer would reprise the character in a new series on Paramount+.

Grammer received award recognitions for portraying this character on these two shows, in addition to a 1992 one-time appearance on Wings. For his portrayal on Cheers, Grammer was nominated twice for Outstanding Supporting Actor in a Comedy Series but did not win in that category. For portraying the character on Frasier, Kelsey Grammer won four Emmy Awards out of eleven nominations for Outstanding Lead Actor in a Comedy Series and two Golden Globe Awards out of eight nominations for Best Performance by an Actor in a Television Series (Musical or Comedy).

== Creation and casting ==
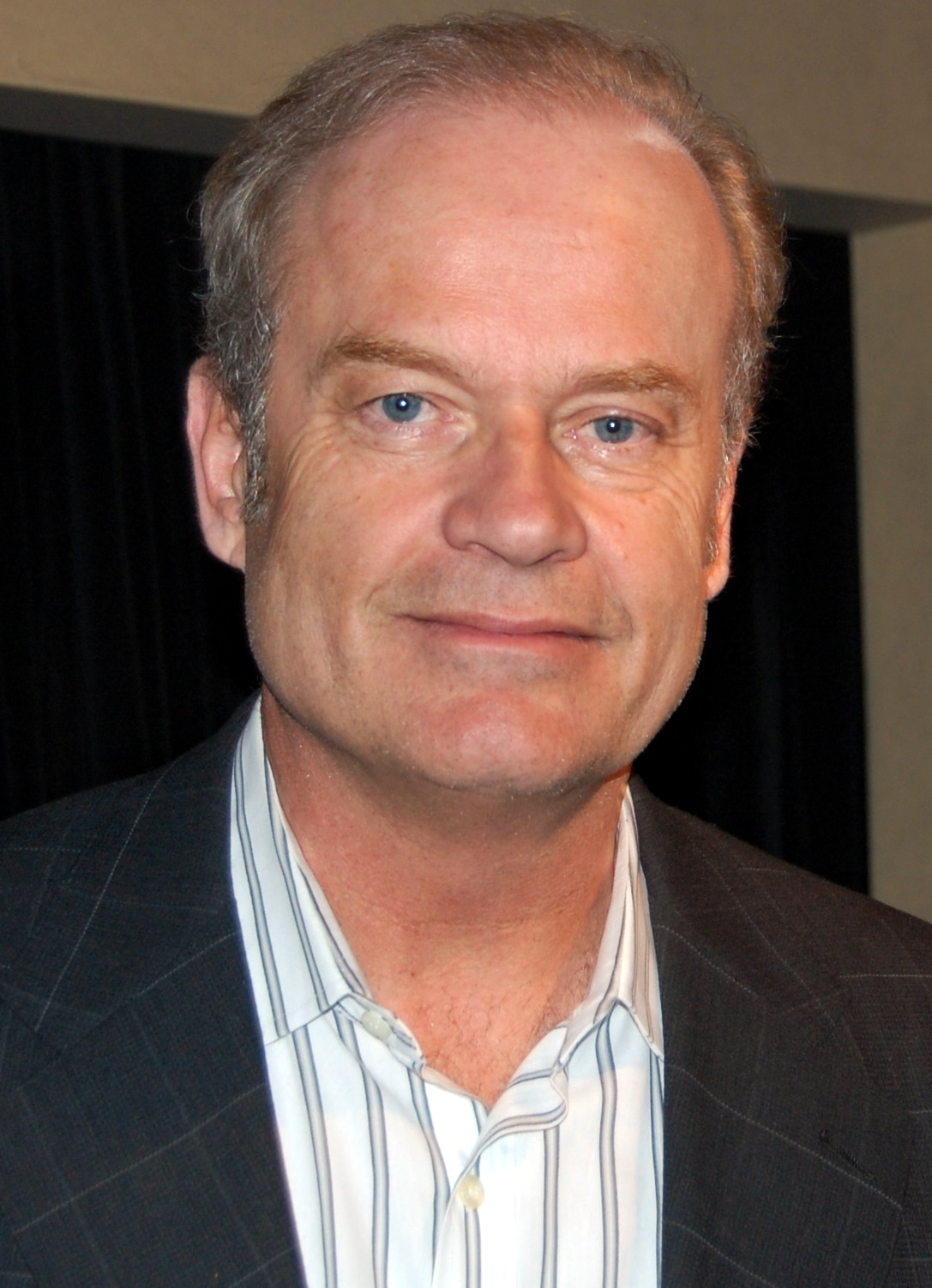
Kelsey Grammer, portrayer of Frasier Crane since 1984

The character Frasier Crane was created in the third season of Cheers (1984–1985) by series creators Glen and Les Charles as Diane Chambers's (Shelley Long) "romantic and intellectual ideal" following her breakup with Sam Malone (Ted Danson). Not only Sam Malone's rival and opposite, Frasier Crane was also part of the love triangle, "a different form of the Sam-Diane relationship," said Glen Charles. The show's writers initially conceived the character as "the role Ralph Bellamy used to play in Cary Grant movies — the guy the lady falls in love with, but is not real. You just know he doesn't have the sexual dynamism Grant does."

John Lithgow was originally chosen by Cheers producers for the role, but turned it down because he felt that television at the time would down his dignity. Grammer believed that he had failed the audition because no one laughed, but was chosen because of the quality of his performance with Danson. Frasier was supposed to appear only on a few episodes before Diane left him, but Grammer's performance was praised by series executives, leading to an extended role in the series. His character was not universally popular, however, for coming between Sam and Diane; a viewer approached Grammer asking "Are you that pin dick that plays Frasier?", and the show received fan mail denouncing Grammer.

== Role in Cheers ==
Frasier Crane, an alumnus of Harvard College, Harvard Medical School, and Oxford University, debuted in the two-part episode "Rebound" (1984), the premiere of Cheers season three (1984–85), as a psychiatrist to help bartender Sam Malone recover from a brief return to alcoholism and also cope with his breakup from Diane Chambers.

As Diane's fiancé throughout the third season, he and Diane are supposed to wed in Italy in "Rescue Me" (1985), the finale of season three. However, in "Birth, Death, Love, and Rice" (1985), the premiere of season four (1985–86), Frasier enters the bar and tells Sam that he was jilted by Diane at the altar in Europe. A despondent Frasier, who had given up his practice to go to Europe, loses his job lecturing at a university in Europe.

Later in season four, he begins to regularly attend Cheers for drinks and finds himself depending more and more on alcohol. In "The Triangle" (1986), Sam feigns symptoms of depression, planned by Diane, to help Frasier recover from alcoholism and regain his self-confidence. This leads Frasier to conclude that Sam's symptoms indicate his love for Diane. However, upon arrival, Frasier sees Sam and Diane arguing in the bar office, and Sam admits the whole plan. Furious, Frasier declares himself to be sober, refuses to be a part of their relationship, and vows to practice psychiatry again.

The character finally becomes a permanent fixture among the other bar patrons by the middle of the series' run and adds to his comedic repertoire an occasional penchant for commenting on the personality flaws of the other Cheers regulars while still managing to remain a likable addition to the gang. As his role is expanded, Frasier becomes romantically involved with a stereotypical "intelligent ice queen" Lilith Sternin (Bebe Neuwirth). Their first date in "Second Time Around" (1986) does not go well; they exchange insults with each other until she leaves the bar, disappointing him. In "Abnormal Psychology" (1986), Frasier and Lilith feel mutual attraction after Diane gives Lilith a makeover. At first reluctant to start anew, they then decide to go on another date. They live together for a year before being married one month before "Our Hourly Bread" (1988) as revealed in the episode and give birth to their son Frederick in "The Stork Brings a Crane" (1989). In "Smotherly Love" (1992), they reenact their wedding to please Lilith's mother Betty (Marilyn Cooper), who was irritated that she had not been present for their marriage.

In "One Hugs, the Other Doesn't" (1992), Frasier is revealed to have been previously married to Nanette Guzman (Emma Thompson), now known as the popular children's entertainer Nanny G. When Nanette sings a song implying her possible feelings for Frasier (despite being fully aware he's remarried), Lilith attacks her during Frederick's second birthday party.

In "Teaching with the Enemy" (1992), Lilith admits her affair with another man, Dr. Louis Pascal (Peter Vogt), dooming their marriage. In "Is There a Doctor in the Howe?" (1993), a distraught Frasier is going to sleep with Rebecca Howe in his bed until Lilith unexpectedly returns and—in the following episode, "The Bar Manager, The Shrink, His Wife and Her Lover" (1993)—storms out of the room and heads to Cheers. There, Lilith reveals that the eco-pod experiment with Pascal was a disaster—Pascal turned out to be claustrophobic, among other mental problems—and she abandoned the project to return to Boston. Frasier, Rebecca, and eventually Pascal converge on Cheers in pursuit of Lilith. Pascal, armed with a pistol, demands Lilith return to him, threatening to shoot Frasier and the others. Lilith demands that he shoot her first, which causes him to back down and surrender to the police. Although Frasier initially refuses to take Lilith back after all this, her pathetic sobbing wins him over, and he hesitantly reconciles with her.

== Role in Frasier ==
=== Spin-off development ===
When Cheers ended in 1993, at first the creators did not plan to spin off the character from the predecessor because they were concerned that a spinoff might fail. Instead, they wanted to cast Kelsey Grammer as a paraplegic millionaire resembling Malcolm Forbes, "a magazine mogul [and] a motorcycle enthusiast". The idea was deemed unsuitable and scrapped. Then the show's creators decided to move Frasier Crane out of Boston to avoid any resemblance to Cheers. The spinoff idea would have focused primarily on "his work at a radio station", but they found it resembled an older sitcom, WKRP in Cincinnati, too much. Therefore, they decided to add in his private life, such as his father Martin and younger brother Niles. In his titular spin-off, Frasier becomes "haughty, disdainful, and exceedingly uptight."

=== Moving to Seattle ===
After Cheers, Frasier and Lilith (Bebe Neuwirth) divorce off-screen, and Lilith is awarded custody of their son, Frederick, with Frasier granted visiting rights. In the pilot "The Good Son", Frasier explains that he left Boston because he felt that his life and career had grown stagnant (and he had been publicly humiliated after climbing onto a ledge and threatening to commit suicide before being talked down). Therefore, he returned to his original hometown of Seattle, where his father Martin (John Mahoney) and younger brother Niles (David Hyde Pierce) live, to have a fresh start.

Frasier works for the radio station KACL as the host of his psychotherapeutic radio show, The Dr. Frasier Crane Show, produced by his producer and friend, Roz Doyle (Peri Gilpin), who has many ex-boyfriends. Later, his father Martin, a retired Seattle Police Department detective who was shot in the line of duty, ends up moving in with him. Frasier is worried about his father in his current state as he can barely walk, and requires a cane to move. In Cheers, Frasier had said that his father was dead and had been a scientist. He also says that he is an only child. This inconsistency is later explained in "The Show Where Sam Shows Up": At Frasier's apartment, Sam Malone (Ted Danson) tells Martin and Niles what Frasier had said about them, and Frasier explains that he was trying to distance himself from his family at the time. He confirms in "To All the Girls I've Loved Before" (1988) that his mother Hester, portrayed by Nancy Marchand in "Diane Meets Mom" (1984) and then by Rita Wilson in flashbacks in "Mamma Mia" (1999) and "Don Juan in Hell: Part 2" (2001), is dead off-screen.

Frasier hires a live-in physical therapist, Daphne Moon (Jane Leeves), to care for Martin. Daphne is an eccentric, working class Englishwoman who professes to be "a bit psychic". Moreover, Martin brings his beloved Jack Russell Terrier, Eddie, whom Frasier is uncomfortable around. After some initial hostility, Frasier grows very close to his new family.

=== Life with Martin and Niles ===
During the spin-off's run, especially in scenes at Frasier's apartment, Frasier and Martin regularly fight over the living arrangements and each other's personalities: Frasier is intellectual, elitist, and mild-mannered, while Martin is a rugged man of simple tastes who speaks (according to Frasier) in words that no "sophisticated, educated" person could understand. While Frasier has many common interests with Niles and shares adventures (or misadventures) with him, he has little in common with his father, Martin.

In "Dinner at Eight" (1993), Martin takes Frasier and Niles to a themed steakhouse, where health-conscious Frasier and Niles criticize the food, the restaurant's customs, and the clientele. Martin becomes frustrated and angry before leaving, remarking upon departing that their mother, Hester, would be disappointed with their behavior. Frasier and Niles try to prove that they are not "snobs" by finishing their meal, although it takes them until after closing time. Ironically, in the Cheers season seven episode "I Kid You Not" (1988), Frasier invites Carla and her son Ludlow to a fine dining restaurant, but Carla and Ludlow criticize and mock it, enraging Frasier.

In "Chess Pains" (1996), Frasier teaches Martin how to play chess, but is horrified when Martin becomes a better player than him, due to Martin's seasoned insight as a police detective. Frasier becomes obsessed with winning against his father until Frasier wins one match and Martin does not want to play with Frasier anymore. One late night, Frasier wakes Martin up and asks him whether he lost the chess match on purpose. Martin responds that Frasier "won, fair and square" and nothing more. In the Cheers season five episode "Spellbound" (1987), dimwitted Woody Boyd consistently beats Frasier in chess, frustrating Frasier.

In an episode of the seventh season "A Tsar Is Born" (1999), Martin takes an old family clock, which Frasier and Niles consider ugly, to exhibit on the television show Antiques Roadshow. As the boys soon discover, the clock is related to their ancestors and royalty, and may be worth a fortune, and heightens their expectations of being descended from royalty. Unfortunately, when they try to sell the clock later, the brothers learn from an antique specialist that it was stolen from the daughter of Tsar Alexander II. Moreover, their great-great-grandmother was discovered to have been the clock thief and the daughter's scullery maid and is discovered to have later been a prostitute in New York City. Therefore, the brothers are left without a fortune, a clock, and their royal dreams are destroyed, as Frasier puts it, they are descended from "thieves and whores". Much to their anger, Martin buys a Winnebago RV with money Frasier claimed was the proceeds from selling the clock.

==== Reunion with Lilith and Frederick ====
Actress Bebe Neuwirth left Cheers for fear of becoming typecast and to do Broadway; she did not expect to appear recurrently on Frasier. Cheers and Frasier writers Ken Levine and David Isaacs found the chemistry between Frasier and Lilith "special" enough to compare them with Katharine Hepburn and Spencer Tracy on Prozac. In "The Show Where Lilith Comes Back" (1994), Lilith surprises Frasier by dialing into the radio show. They later make love in a hotel room but end up regretting it, prompting them to part ways again. They decide to remain friends and help each other co-parent their son, Frederick (Trevor Einhorn), who also appears occasionally in this spin-off. In "Adventures in Paradise, Part Two" (1994), Lilith gets engaged to her fiancé Brian (James Morrison), much to Frasier's chagrin. In "A Lilith Thanksgiving" (1996), Frasier and Lilith have Frederick admitted to a private school after they annoy the administrator (Paxton Whitehead) several times on Thanksgiving. In "The Unnatural" (1997), Frasier is proven unathletic and bad at softball, which he reluctantly admits to Frederick. Then Frasier tells him that, when Frasier was a third-grade elementary student, Martin was bad at math.

In "Room Service" (1998), Lilith is recently divorced from her husband Brian for his gay affair. Frasier attempts to renew the relationship but changes his mind when he finds out, to his horror, that Lilith and Niles had a drunken one-night stand. Lilith last appears in "Guns 'N Neuroses" (2003), in which she and Frasier are accidentally set up to go on a blind date. Lilith and Frasier are close to restarting a relationship in the hotel room, but they are interrupted by a loud argument between a young married couple next door. Frasier and Lilith can resolve the couple's dispute, spend the night together watching television, and finally fall asleep on the couch without having had sex. The next morning, they part ways with a tender final onscreen moment together.

=== Reunions with Cheers characters ===
Except for Rebecca Howe (Kirstie Alley), all the surviving main cast members of Cheers appear in the show at various points. In "The Show Where Sam Shows Up" (1995), Sam Malone reunites with Frasier in Seattle. Later, Frasier is discovered to have slept with Sam's fiancée Sheila (Téa Leoni), but Sam has not discovered the affair, much to Frasier's relief. Nevertheless, Sam finds out her dalliances with Paul Krapence (Paul Willson) and Cliff Clavin (John Ratzenberger). Though Sam isn't initially angry when told of her infidelity with Paul when Sheila reveals she slept with Cliff (something that shocked and horrified both Sam and Frasier), it leads to him ending the romantic relationship. In "The Show Where Diane Comes Back" (1996), Frasier is reunited with Diane Chambers and learns that due to an accident with her and Dr. Quinn, Medicine Woman (Jane Seymour), much of her personal life had been turned upside down and the financial backers for her upcoming play rescinded their support, prompting him to support it instead. The play turns out to be based on their relationship in Boston, including her leaving him at the altar. Frasier angrily confronts her about it, but they end up reconciling.

In "The Show Where Woody Shows Up" (1999), Woody Boyd (Woody Harrelson), still married to Kelly with his son and daughter, accidentally reunites with Frasier after landing in the wrong destination, Seattle. However, they realize that they are no longer friends, as their lives are too different. Nevertheless, they admit that they had good times together in Boston, and they will always think about each other. In "Cheerful Goodbyes" (2002), Frasier arrives in Boston for a psychiatric conference. At the airport, Frasier unexpectedly bumps into Cliff Clavin and is invited to Cliff's retirement party the following evening, where he is reunited with Carla Tortelli (Rhea Perlman) and then briefly Norm Peterson (George Wendt). Later, Cliff confides in Frasier that he fears that his friends will not miss him. Frasier tells everyone to say a nice farewell to Cliff; even Carla, who hates him. Moved, Cliff decides to stay in Boston, much to Carla's annoyance.

=== Final years: 2003–04 ===
In "Caught in the Act" (2004), Frasier's ex-wife Nanette Guzman (Laurie Metcalf), tries to rekindle their relationship, but Frasier refuses. (The character was previously portrayed by Emma Thompson in Cheers episode "One Hugs, the Other Doesn't" (1992) and by Dina Spybey in "Don Juan in Hell, Part 2" (2001) as part of Frasier's imaginary dream.) Later, he falls in love with Charlotte Connor (Laura Linney), but the romance turns out to be short-lived when she moves to Chicago. In the 2004 two-part series finale, "Goodnight, Seattle", Frasier is offered a job as the host of his television talk show, located in San Francisco, and has decided to accept the job. However, in the final scene of the show, it is revealed that Frasier has boarded a plane to Chicago, implying he will be with Charlotte.

=== The revival: 2023–2024 ===
In the revival series, Frasier again returns to Boston, coming from Martin's funeral. Off-screen, Frasier has since been disillusioned with and then quit his eponymous television talk show in Chicago, and his relationship with Charlotte has ended as well. He tries to reconnect with his son Frederick (now Jack Cutmore-Scott), nicknamed Freddy, who has dropped out of Harvard and then become a firefighter. Frasier becomes recruited by Harvard's psychology department as a psychology professor, especially to prove himself as a serious psychiatrist rather than a mere showman. He also buys Freddy's apartment building, and has Freddy move in with him in his new apartment across the hall from Freddy's old apartment.

Frasier and Freddy visit Seattle in the revival's second season, where Frasier reunites with his old KACL coworkers.

== Other appearances ==
Kelsey Grammer has made several appearances as Dr. Frasier Crane outside of Cheers and Frasier.

- Mickey's 60th Birthday (1988)
- Walt Disney's Wonderful World of Color Season 34, Episode 15, "Disneyland's 35th Anniversary Celebration" (1990)
- The Earth Day Special (1990)
- Wings Season 3, Episode 16, "Planes, Trains and Visiting Cranes" (1992)
- The John Larroquette Show Season 3, Episode 1, "More Changes" (1995) (Note: Via archive footage)
- Dr Pepper TV Commercial (2008)

An animated version of the character appears in The Simpsons episode "Fear of Flying", although Grammer, who voices Sideshow Bob on the show, does not voice the character of Frasier.

== Characterization and analysis ==
Frasier Crane is a licensed psychiatrist who is, as Kelsey Grammer described, "flawed, silly, pompous, and full of himself, [yet] kind [and] vulnerable." Judy Berman from Flavor Wire describes him as also "a child prodigy, theater geek, and frequent target for bullies." According to Cheers and Frasier writer Peter Casey, Frasier is "very complicated, very intelligent, but also very insecure"; he may have solutions to such problems as a psychiatrist but is clueless about himself.

== Reception ==
=== Reception on the character ===
At the time Cheers originally aired, Rick Sherwood from Los Angeles disdained Frasier Crane and his existence as part of the "Sam and Diane" dynamic. Sherwood found Frasier's frequent appearances in the bar setting ("his [former] girlfriend's former lover's bar") responsible for turning Cheers into "as believable as [conservative] Archie Bunker [from All in the Family] voting for a liberal Democrat." According to a 1993 telephone survey before the Frasier premiere and the Cheers finale, Sam Malone (Ted Danson) scored 26 percent as a favorite character, and Frasier Crane scored 1 percent. In response to the question of spinning off a character, 15 percent voted Sam, 12 percent voted Woody Boyd (Woody Harrelson), 10 percent voted Norm Peterson (George Wendt), and 29 percent voted no spin-offs. Frasier Crane, whose own spin-off Frasier debuted in September 1993, was voted by 2 percent to have his own show.

Later, while the character became more prominent in the series, inspiring a spin-off Frasier, in a 1999 book Writing and Responsibility, Beverly West and Jason Bergund noted that Frasier's father Martin was supposed to be dead in Cheers but turns out still alive in Frasier, calling it inconsistent with "a bout of amnesia[,] poor scriptwriting", or desperation to elicit more laughter. (In "The Show Where Sam Shows Up" [1995], Frasier addresses the inconsistency by explaining that he told his friends Martin was dead after an argument with him.) In another book TV Therapy, Frasier Crane in Cheers is considered "high-strung [and] pseudo-sophisticated" and an attraction to 1980s demographics of "anti-intellectual snobbery", but Frasier in Frasier is considered a good, positive role model for intellectuality and sophistication. In 2004, he was ranked by Bravo No. 26 of Bravo's The 100 Greatest TV Characters of all time. In 2009, the National Lampoon website ranked him No. 20 of "Top 20 Sitcom Characters You'd Kill in Real Life" and called him "hilarious" in the fictional world and "unbearable" in the real world.

Robert Bianco from USA Today considered Frasier Crane masculine in the days of "Fred Astaire and William Powell" instead of recent "beer-belching" days of the reality show, Survivor. Bianco found the series of Frasier's love life repetitive and "tiring". Gillian Flynn from Entertainment Weekly considered Frasier Crane's "diction" an inspiration of Fringe's Walter Bishop (John Noble), who has an addition of "daffiness" of roles portrayed by actor Christopher Lloyd. Joe Sixpack, a pseudonymous name for writer Don Russell, called Frasier an "insufferable twerp". An internet user from Ken Levine's blog considered Frasier a successor to more prestigious, experienced Bostonian medical doctor and surgeon Charles Winchester (David Ogden Stiers) from the television series M*A*S*H. However, Levine did not consider the comparison when Frasier was introduced in Cheers in 1984. (Coincidentally, in the Frasier episode "Fathers and Son" (2003), actor Stiers, portrayer of Winchester, appears as Hester Crane's former lab assistant Leland Barton, who is suspected as Frasier and Niles' biological father.) Television Without Pity called Frasier "snooty and pretentious", even if he may be "smart" on television and a "rare" species of all characters. Steve Silverman from Screen Junkies praised Kelsey Grammer's performances as Frasier Crane but found them "predictable". Silverman thought that Grammer did not deserve an Emmy, especially in 1998. In a note, Silverman deemed the character Frasier as "a windbag with a sense of humor" and "a whining schoolboy with a series of lame excuses."

=== Reception on Frasier and Lilith ===
Martha Nolan from The New York Times called Frasier and Lilith "repressed" when married together in Cheers. Josh Bell from About.com called Frasier and his ex-wife Lilith Sternin one of the "best sitcom divorced couples" of all time. Steven H. Scheuer from Sarasota Herald-Tribune considered Lilith's significance to and marriage with Frasier "fun" to watch, especially when, in "Severe Crane Damage" (1990), she uses comparisons between "the duller good boy" Frasier and "the interesting bad boy" Sam Malone as "psychiatric examples of the good boy-bad boy syndrome". Faye Zuckerman and John Martin from The New York Times called their marriage in Cheers a hilariously "perfect mismatch". Television critic Kevin McDonough from New York praised Kelsey Grammer and Bebe Neuwirth's performances as "repressed individuals" and "separate couple on TV" with "acidic and hilarious" chemistry together.

=== Accolades ===
For his performance as Frasier Crane in Cheers, Kelsey Grammer was Primetime Emmy Award-nominated for Outstanding Supporting Actor in a Comedy Series in 1988 and 1990. For the same role in Wings episode "Planes, Trains, and Visiting Cranes", he was nominated for Outstanding Lead Actor in a Comedy Series in 1992. (Note: There were no nominations for guest performances in 1992.)

For the same role in Cheers spin-off Frasier, Grammer was consecutively nominated for Outstanding Lead Actor in a Comedy Series during the series' entire run (except in 2003), winning in 1994, 1995, 1998, and 2004. He earned eight Golden Globe Award nominations for Best Performance by an Actor in a Television Series – Musical or Comedy throughout the series' run, winning in 1996 and 2001. Grammer won the American Comedy Award for Funniest Male Performer in a TV Series (Leading Role) – Network, Cable or Syndication in 1995 and 1996. Grammer won the Screen Actors Guild Award for Outstanding Performance by an Ensemble in a Comedy Series as part of the cast ensemble of Frasier in 2000.
