= Tom Anderson (producer) =

American producer and screenwriter

- Occupation(s): Producer, screenwriter

Tom Anderson is an American producer and screenwriter. He won a Primetime Emmy Award and was nominated for three more in the category Outstanding Comedy Series for his work on the television program Cheers. Anderson produced and wrote for television programs including Living Single, Kevin Can Wait, Something Wilder, Newhart and The Jeff Foxworthy Show.

Anderson is the brother of the former mayor of Willoughby, Ohio, David Anderson.
