= Woody Boyd =

Fictional character in the series Cheers

- Cheers character
- from "I Will Gladly Pay You Tuesday" (episode 75, 1985)
- First appearance: Cheers: "Birth, Death, Love and Rice" (season 4, episode 1)
- Last appearance: Frasier: "The Show Where Woody Shows Up" (season 6, episode 13)
- Portrayed by: Woody Harrelson

In-universe information
- Full name: Woodrow Huckleberry Tiberius Boyd
- Gender: Male
- Occupation: Actor; Assistant bartender Politician
- Family: Edgel Boyd (father); Margaret Boyd (mother); Tom Boyd (brother); Meg (grandmother)
- Spouse: Kelly Gaines (1992–)
- Children: Unnamed son Unnamed daughter
- Relatives: Walt (uncle); Fergie (uncle); Russell Boyd (cousin)
- Religion: Lutheran Church–Missouri Synod (Before marriage); Lutheran Church of America (After marriage)
- Nationality: American
- Birth date: July 23

Woodrow Huckleberry Tiberius Boyd is a fictional character on the American television show Cheers, portrayed by Woody Harrelson. Woody, simple-minded but good-hearted, debuts in the season premiere of the fourth season, "Birth, Death, Love and Rice". He also appears in one Frasier episode "The Show Where Woody Shows Up".

== Cheers ==
Woody was born on July 23 (like Harrelson) and hails from Hanover, Indiana, where he was voted the smartest student in school. His mother's name was Margaret and his father's name is Edgel.

He and his childhood sweetheart, Beth Curtis, were voted "Couple Most Likely to Explode," as they were both obese at the time. It was later revealed that they always ate, to excess, around one another due to their palpable sexual tension.

Woody followed in Coach's footsteps in many ways, failing to understand the most obvious jokes, concepts, and situations. Woody was essentially a straight man for all of the other characters at Cheers, though his humor stemmed from his misunderstandings.

Woody seemed to have an off-center mentality, misunderstanding others' comments much as Coach had done. For example, when Bill Medley of The Righteous Brothers appears and starts singing "You've Lost That Loving Feeling," Woody asks him, "How come you changed your name from Righteous?" With the exception of Carla, Eddie, and Sam, Woody always addresses other characters by their honorific. Sometimes this leads to awkward phrasing such as referring to Lilith as Mrs. Dr. Sternin-Crane.

Woody arrived at Cheers expecting to meet his "pen pal" Coach, with whom he exchanged pens instead of letters. Upon learning of Coach's death, he filled the open bartender position, and was quickly accepted by the staff and regulars. He also developed a "big brother/little brother" relationship with Sam Malone, the owner of Cheers. In the coming years, he filled the void left by Coach and eventually married the wealthy Kelly Gaines (Jackie Swanson), overcoming her father's objections to Woody's lowly station in life as well as conflicting religious views: he's Lutheran Church–Missouri Synod, she's "Evangelical Lutheran Church of America" (in the episode "... of America" is used, but the real denomination name ends "... in America").

In the final season, Frasier Crane orchestrated an experiment that went awry and resulted in Woody's election to the Boston City Council. He and Kelly were expecting their first child when Cheers ended. Frasier extrapolates on Woody's interest in a political career to the point that Woody becomes President of the United States and shows his displeasure with another country by using "The Bomb" (illustrated twice in Frasier's imagination as a mushroom cloud).

== In other appearances ==
Woody Harrelson reprised his role in the 1990 Walt Disney anthology television series episode Disneyland 35th Anniversary Celebration, where his young self in a flashback is played by Branden Maciel. The character also appeared on The Simpsons episode "Fear of Flying".

== Frasier ==
Woody makes a guest appearance on Frasier, the spin-off show from Cheers, in the season 6 episode "The Show Where Woody Shows Up". During a visit to Seattle he reconnects with Frasier Crane, who had since moved there from Boston. After a one-night reunion, the two begin to spend a great deal of time with each other – which gradually turns into an ordeal for both, as they quickly realize they have moved on from their past and settled into new lives, with neither man seeing the other's life as being particularly fulfilling. The two men decide to part company on good terms, after sharing a final drink with each other, leading Woody to utter his final line: "Cheers".

Although this is Woody's only appearance on the show, he is referenced both prior to and after this. When Sam visits Frasier in the season 2 episode, "The Show Where Sam Comes Back", he reveals that Kelly and Woody's first child was a boy, who is of normal intelligence. In the season 9 episode "Cheerful Goodbyes," Frasier reveals that at his going-away party at Cheers before returning to Seattle, Woody grabbed onto his legs and begged him not to go. Woody's political career was not mentioned in Frasier; he states at the beginning of the season 6 episode "The Show Where Woody Shows Up" that he is still tending bar at Cheers.
