= Carla Tortelli =

Fictional character in the series Cheers

- Cheers character
- in "The Tortelli Tort" (episode 3, 1982)
- First appearance: "Give Me a Ring Sometime" (episode 1.01)
- Last appearance: "Cheerful Goodbyes" (Frasier episode 9.21)
- Portrayed by: Rhea Perlman

In-universe information
- Aliases: Carla Maria Victoria Angelina Teresa Apollonia Lozupone Tortelli LeBec; Carla LeBec; Carla Lozupone
- Gender: Female
- Occupation: Waitress
- Family: Benito Lozupone (father); Mrs. Lozupone, née Mussolini (mother); Annette Lozupone (sister); Angeline (sister); Sal Lozupone (brother); Unnamed brother
- Spouses: Nick Tortelli (divorced); Eddie LeBec (widowed)
- Significant others: Dr. Bennett Ludlow; John Allen Hill
- Children: Anthony Tortelli; Serafina McDougall (née Tortelli); Gino Tortelli; Anne Marie Tortelli; Lucia Tortelli; Ludlow Tortelli; Elvis LeBec; Jesse LeBec
- Relatives: Frankie (nephew); Annie Tortelli (daughter-in-law); Pat McDougall (son-in-law); Antonio Lozupone (grandfather); Paolo (uncle); Santo Cabone (cousin); Amerigo (great-uncle); Sophia (great-aunt); Unnamed grandchild
- Nationality: Italian-American

Carla Maria Victoria Angelina Teresa Apollonia Lozupone Tortelli LeBec, commonly known as Carla Tortelli, is a fictional character in the American television show Cheers, portrayed by Rhea Perlman. Outwardly, at least, Carla is a sarcastic woman who often mocks and makes jabs at others. She had five children with her then-husband Nick when the series started and eight children with three different men when it ended.

Carla appeared in all 275 episodes of Cheers in 1982–1993 and guest-starred in "Cheerful Goodbyes", an episode of the spin-off Frasier. She has also appeared in "Cheers", an episode of St. Elsewhere; "Fear of Flying", an episode of The Simpsons, and the pilot episode of the short-lived spinoff The Tortellis. Along with Sam Malone and Norm Peterson, she is one of only three characters to appear in every episode of Cheers.

== Casting ==
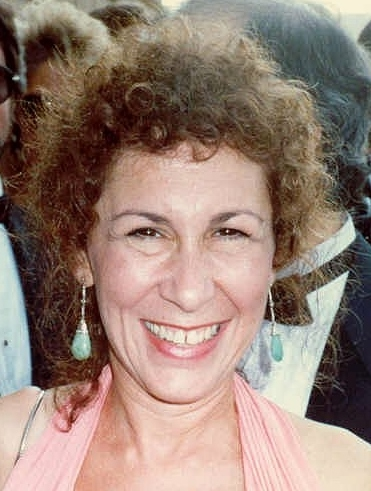
Perlman at the 1988 Primetime Emmy Awards

According to an interview with Ted Danson, Perlman was the first person of all actors to be hired as part of a cast ensemble and then was cast as Carla Tortelli, "a wisecracking, cynical waitress". Before she starred as Carla, she worked once as a waitress in a New York City restaurant, serving meals like spaghetti and fish. Also, she was trained in the Bull & Finch Pub (now called Cheers Beacon Hill) by a waitress to prepare her character. Perlman previously appeared as Louie DePalma's (Danny DeVito) sweet and kind girlfriend, in contrast to tomboy Carla, on Taxi.

I think Carla's a lot of things I'd like to be. I'm not like her, but she's a person who's always got a wisecrack. I always think of something two hours later. But we're both earthy and practical. We're survivors. The character is well-written, but you always put a lot of yourself into it.

— Rhea Perlman, The Associated Press, April 1983

== Role ==
When the show premiered in 1982, "feisty", "worldly-wise", Catholic and highly superstitious waitress Carla Tortelli has four children to support, fathered by her ex-husband Nick Tortelli (Dan Hedaya): Anthony (Timothy Williams), Serafina (Leah Remini), Gino (Josh Lozoff), and Anne Marie (Risa Littman). During their marriage, he was a deadbeat father and disloyal, unfaithful husband to Carla by cheating on her with other women. Over time, she gives birth to four more children: Lucinda (Sabrina Wiener) fathered by Nick; (Note: "Father Knows Last", season 1) Ludlow, nicknamed Lud (Jarrett Lennon), by Frasier's mentor Dr. Bennett Ludlow (James Karen); (Note: "Whodunit?", season 3) and twins Elvis (Danny Kramer) and Jesse (Thomas Tulak) by Eddie Lebec (Jay Thomas), a then-ice hockey player who later becomes an ice show performer. All children but one (Lud) turn out to be unruly, rotten, and spoiled. They defy whoever is substituting for their mother Carla, including babysitters.

In Season 1, Carla says she is from Federal Hill in Providence. Carla has siblings, including two sisters (younger Annette (also played by Perlman) (Note: "Little Sister Don't Cha", season 2) and Angeline) and two brothers (including Sal). (Note: "Honor Thy Mother", season 10) Six of her siblings are older. (Note: "The Tortelli Tort," Season 1) In "The Cranemakers" (1989), according to Whitney Norris (James R. Winker), representative of the estate of Carla's late grandfather, Antonio Lozuponi, Antonio deserted his wife in 1921, moved to Los Angeles with just his "lucky quarter", and made fortune selling peach and oil products. Feeling bad about leaving his family behind, he gave his surviving legitimate family a will of $20 million, suppressed by his illegitimate son, Paolo, who "squandered the entire fortune on fast horses and loose women." The will was not discovered until Paolo's death in the previous month. Norris delivers just Antonio's "lucky quarter" to Carla, devastating her. (Note: "The Cranemakers", season 7) She also has a nephew Frankie, to whom Lilith and Rebecca are attracted while he works as a temporary bartender for one time. (Note: "Get Your Kicks On Route 666", season 10)

As a waitress, she is more experienced than her nemesis Diane Chambers (Shelley Long), who has a nice personality and upper-class traits, contrary to Carla, who treats regular customers with disdain and mostly negative sarcasm, including Cliff Clavin, a know-it-all bar patron. A devoted and often-disappointed Boston Red Sox fan, (Note: "The Tortelli Tort", season 1) she became friends with Sam Malone (Ted Danson) and Coach Ernie Pantusso (Nicholas Colasanto) during Sam's baseball days at least five years before the show started (Note: "Truce or Consequences", season 1) and came to work for him at Cheers when Sam retired from baseball and bought the bar.

Carla notably idolizes Elvis Presley, opting to take annual trips to Graceland, naming one of her later kids after him, and even eventually trying to make contact with him in "Don't Shoot... I'm Only the Psychiatrist" (1992).

In two-part episode "Never Love a Goalie" (1987), Carla briefly dates the Boston Bruins ice hockey player, Guy "Eddie" LeBec, who has an endless winning streak and a French Canadian background. As a result, Eddie's winning streak ends abruptly. Since both are superstitious, they promise to break up repeatedly before every game to avoid the "curse". In "Home Is the Sailor", Carla is revealed to be several months pregnant with Eddie's twins (incorporated by another of Perlman's pregnancies), so she and Eddie wed in "Little Carla, Happy at Last: Part 2". Also, in the episode, the Bruins replaces him with a younger player, and he could not find another team. In "Airport V" (1988), Eddie becomes a penguin mascot for a traveling ice show in another state. In "Tale of Two Cuties", Carla gives birth to their twin boys, named Elvis and Jesse.

In "Death Takes a Holiday on Ice" (1989), Eddie was killed by an ice resurfacer when he saved the life of another member of the ice show. At the funeral, it was revealed that he had concurrently another wife Gloria with twins, as well. Carla changes her surname back to Tortelli to avoid being confused with the other "Mrs. LeBec". The demise of Jay Thomas's character Eddie LeBec has been claimed to stem from Thomas's comments "about" Perlman in a radio show. However, Thomas denied this and declared that he was referring only to the Carla character. Despite Ken Levine's praise on Thomas's acting and pairing of Eddie and Carla, Eddie was written out of the show because Perlman thought that the pairing would make her "not part of the people in the bar."

In "Head Over Hill" (1991), Carla tries to pull a vengeance on John Allen Hill (Keene Curtis), Sam's upper-class rival, owner of the restaurant Melville's, and co-owner of Cheers, on Sam's behalf. However, she ironically ends up sleeping with him. Since then, she has on-and-off sexual encounters with John. In "Feelings... Whoa, Whoa, Whoa" (1992), she comes into terms of her feelings for John, but she and John find each other incompatible except in bed.

In her only episode of Frasier, "Cheerful Goodbyes" (2002), according to her, two of Carla's sons are imprisoned and her house is on the verge of foreclosing. She is relieved that Cliff will be retiring into Florida. However, in his retirement party, influenced by his friends' farewell comments - including a vicious tirade by Carla which he mistakes as a sarcastic tribute - Cliff decides to stay in Boston, much to her dismay. She attempts to attack him with a harpoon but is restrained by others.

== Reception ==
Carla says something really crass and stupid here, and we move on before the audience hates her.

— —David Lloyd

Carla Tortelli was voted a favorite character by eight percent of 1,011 people, who were surveyed in 1993 by the Times Mirror Center for the People and the Press (now Pew Research Center). She was ranked No. 66 out of Bravo's The 100 Greatest TV Characters of all-time. Steve Craig of the University of North Texas noted that she "lacks the charm, warmth, and demureness of the feminine ideal" and is a ridicule of anti-feminism for her "un-ladylike" promiscuity. Bill Simmons, previously of ESPN, praised her in episodes that do not mainly focus on her.

Heather Hundley noted that the series sends a "double standards" message about men and women involved in promiscuity. She noted that the series portrays Sam Malone as heroic, who never suffers from negative consequences of his promiscuity, while it portrays Carla as "nymphomaniac", who regrets her own promiscuities for out-of-wedlock pregnancies and wrong lovers. She finds the series's portrayal of premarital sex "negative and unhealthy", especially for omitting other dangers of promiscuity, like sexually transmitted diseases and HIV/AIDS.

Rhea Perlman won Emmy Awards as an Outstanding Supporting Actress in a Comedy Series in 1984, 1985, 1986, and 1989 for her portrayal of Carla. She was honored as the Best Supporting Actress (Comedy) by Viewers for Quality Television in 1985 and the "Funniest Supporting Actress" by the American Comedy Awards in 1989.
