= Cheers season 2 =

Cheers
- Season 2
- Region 1 DVD
- Showrunner: Glen and Les Charles
- Starring: Ted Danson; Shelley Long; Nicholas Colasanto; Rhea Perlman; John Ratzenberger; George Wendt
- No. of episodes: 22

Release
- Original network: NBC
- Original release: September 29, 1983 – May 10, 1984

Season chronology
- ← Previous; Season 1 Next → Season 3

The second season of the American television sitcom Cheers aired on NBC from September 29, 1983, to May 10, 1984. The show was created by director James Burrows and writers Glen and Les Charles and was produced by Charles Burrows Charles Productions in association with Paramount Television. The second season has been released on DVD as a four-disc set.

The show won Emmy Awards, including one for Outstanding Comedy Series, in 1983 and 1984. Critical reception was mostly positive, with negative commentary about the extended romance between Sam and Diane.

== Background ==
During season one (1982–1983), the show's Nielsen ratings were very low, despite strong, positive reviews. Nonetheless, NBC renewed the show for another season, which was announced on March 13, 1983. In mid-1983, reruns improved the show's ratings, which rose into the top 20 for most episodes. Four days before the second season premiered, the show won five Emmy Awards out of thirteen nominations, including an Outstanding Comedy Series of 1982–83. Meanwhile, Taxi and Fame, two shows that were originally part of NBC's 1982–83 Thursday night lineup, struggled with low ratings. Taxi was moved from Thursday to Saturday, and Fame was moved into first-run syndication. As announced in May 1983, the Fall 1983 Thursday lineup consisted of, in order of time sequence starting at 8 pm (Eastern) / 7 pm (Central), Gimme a Break!, Mama's Family, We Got It Made, Cheers and Hill Street Blues. In December, We Got It Made was on hiatus and later moved to Saturdays, Buffalo Bill took over the 9:30 pm time slot, and Cheers was shown at 9 pm.

== Cast and characters ==
- Sam Malone (Ted Danson)—a bartender, bar owner, recovering alcoholic, and ex-baseball player.
- Diane Chambers (Shelley Long)—a college student and waitress. She is often pretentious, annoys customers with her lengthy speeches, and becomes the butt of their jokes.
- Ernie "Coach" Pantusso (Nicholas Colasanto)—an aging bartender and retired baseball coach. Coach is vulnerable to other people's exploits, and is a father figure—especially to Sam and Diane. Although he lacks intelligence, he reveals a glimmer of deep wit.
- Carla Tortelli (Rhea Perlman)—a brassy, divorced waitress. She gives birth to a baby girl and watches her disloyal ex-husband Nick (Dan Hedaya)—unseen in the first season—marry Loretta, an unintelligent blonde.
- Cliff Clavin (John Ratzenberger)—a mailman. During this season it is revealed that he is Norm's best friend. Cliff constantly makes misleading and trivial references, which others find annoying and excessive. In the first season, Ratzenberger was often credited as a guest star, but he appears in the opening credits of the main cast in this season and thereafter.
- Norm Peterson (George Wendt)—semi-unemployed accountant who during this season separates from, then reconciles with, his wife, Vera.

Sam and Diane finally pair up, but their relationship is dysfunctional and has problems. They have fulfilling casual sex but seem to have little else in common. They constantly compete with each other, argue, break up, and make up again until they end their on-again, off-again relationship at the end of the season.

== Episodes ==
Original air dates of following episodes are not actual premiere dates for some television stations of the United States, like KTUU-TV from Anchorage, Alaska. In those areas, episodes may have been broadcast at later dates.

No. overall	No. in season	Title	Directed by	Written by	Original release date	Rating/share/rank (households)
23	1	"Power Play"	James Burrows	Glen Charles & Les Charles	September 29, 1983	18.4 / 29 / #19
After their first kiss, Sam and Diane pick her apartment for a place to have sex. There, he makes fun of her stuffed animals, prompting Diane to throw him out. On Carla's advice, Sam shows up and kicks Diane's door open and kisses her. Diane responds by saying she has called the police. Sam apologizes for his inappropriate behavior, and Diane admits that she never actually called the police.
24	2	"Li'l Sister Don't Cha" "Little Sister Don't Cha"	James Burrows	Heide Perlman	October 13, 1983	18.6 / 28 / #21
Carla goes into labor and her sister Annette Lozupone—also played by Rhea Perlman—substitutes for her at the bar. At first Annette is seen as a goody two-shoes, but she flirts with seemingly every man in Boston, especially those in the bar. Cliff falls in love with Annette and plans to propose to her, but his best friend Norm convinces him that she is not what she seems, and Cliff ends his relationship with her. Coach announces that Carla has given birth to a girl and makes a film which shows Carla dealing with her unruly children. Actress Rhea Perlman actually gave birth to her child in March 1983. Cheers was pre-empted on October 6, 1983, by a nationally broadcast baseball game.
25	3	"Personal Business"	James Burrows	Tom Reeder	October 20, 1983	17.4 / 26 / #29
Diane begs Carla to let her take one night off, but Carla refuses and complains that Sam treats the incompetent waitress Diane too well. Sam and Diane become convinced that lovers cannot work together in the same place, so Diane resigns to find a job elsewhere. Mr. Hedges offers Diane a position, but she refuses it when Mr. Hedges asks Sam whether he saw her naked, making her realize that she is being hired as a sex object rather than for meticulous reasons. Disappointed, Diane returns to her job at Cheers but accuses Sam of rehiring her for the same reasons as Mr. Hedges. Sam assures her that this is not the case, so she is mollified. Norm and his wife Vera are separated. Norm cannot find himself another woman, but Vera is revealed to be dating another man.
26	4	"Homicidal Ham"	James Burrows	David Lloyd	October 27, 1983	18.0 / 28 / #22
Diane's former blind date Andy (Derek McGrath), who studied acting in high school, is unemployed because of his criminal record. He returns to Cheers intending to commit an armed robbery. Sam grabs Andy's unloaded gun, and Carla restrains him. Diane convinces her colleagues not to turn Andy in to the police, and decides to try to reform him. Andy becomes infatuated with Diane and becomes jealous when he sees her kissing Sam. During a live performance of Othello, Andy wrings Diane's neck. Sam thinks that this is part of the play until Andy begins ranting about Sam. Sam rescues Diane while Norm and Cliff ably restrain Andy. On the date that this episode aired, President Ronald Reagan performed his address on live television at 8pm Eastern (ET)/5pm Pacific (PT). The episode was broadcast at 10pm ET/9pm Central rather than its regular time slot. In Pacific and Mountain Time Zones (MT), it still aired at 9:30pm PT/8:30pm MT.
27	5	"Sumner's Return"	James Burrows	Michael J. Weithorn	November 3, 1983	15.3 / 23 / #34
Sam and Diane agree to have dinner with her ex-fiancé Sumner Sloane (Michael McGuire). Fearing that he is not sophisticated enough for Diane and may lose her to more sophisticated Sumner, Sam spends five days reading the novel War and Peace, recommended by Cliff, without sleep. Unfortunately for Sam, Diane and Sumner find the novel too well-known to discuss during dinner. Feeling left out, Sam confesses his jealousy toward Sumner and accuses Sumner of attempting to steal Diane away from him. Sumner admits that Sam was correct and that he and his ex-wife Barbara split up weeks before. Diane chooses Sam for his touching efforts in reading War and Peace, which he learns has been adapted into a movie.
28	6	"Affairs of the Heart"	James Burrows	Heide Perlman	November 10, 1983	18.1 / 26 / #24
Tough, street-talking Carla turns down a date offer from sweet, intelligent Hank (Don Amendolia). Diane advises Carla to enjoy quality time with Hank, so Carla decides to have sex with him. Since both of their homes are unavailable, Diane reluctantly lets Carla and Hank use her apartment. Later, Coach tells Sam and Diane that Hank has a heart condition and that any exertion, especially during sex, will endanger his life. Sam and Diane arrive at Diane's apartment to stop Carla and Hank having sex, but no one is there. When Carla and Hank arrive, Sam and Diane tell Carla about Hank, prompting her to break up with Hank. Sam raises the price of his beer, and Norm struggles to lower his consumption to save his money. However, Norm cannot manage this and has other customers pay for his beers.
29	7	"Old Flames"	James Burrows	David Angell	November 17, 1983	17.2 / 25 / #25
Because of his relationship with Diane, Sam declines to accompany his old divorced friend, sportscaster Dave Richards (Fred Dryer), on a trip to have casual sex with women. Dave assures Sam and Diane that their relationship would only last 24 hours. At first implausible, Sam uses his address book, filled with women's contact details, to give a woman's telephone number to Dave, which shocks Diane. Sam refuses to discard his book for Diane's sake, prompting a temporary break between them. Later, he spends the previous night with Didi (Elizabeth McIvor), arranged by Dave, at the hotel, but he does not sleep with her. The following day, Sam tells Dave that his relationship with Diane is not over and that Dave must accompany someone else. When Dave tells them that Sam kissed Didi last night, Diane bites Sam's lip during a kiss.
30	8	"Manager Coach"	James Burrows	Earl Pomerantz	November 24, 1983	14.2 / 25 / #42
Coach accepts a coaching position for the Titans, a Little League Baseball team. The Titans win games under Coach, but he becomes tyrannical and either berates the players or kicks them out of the team for minor issues. Tired of his tyranny, the players want to quit the team but Coach refuses to let them. Sam reminds Coach about a teacher who tormented Coach during his boyhood and how he's doesn't want to be remembered like that. To cheer the team up, Coach promises changes: a fewer baseball practice sessions and his buying sodas for the team. Carla takes her newborn daughter Lucia to Cheers for breastfeeding, which patrons find disturbing when Coach sees Carla burping the baby, she also helps Coach by gently leaning him against her shoulder, and burping him. Cliff loans Norm $500, and Norm spends some money to take Cliff to dinner.
31	9	"They Called Me Mayday"	James Burrows	David Angell	December 1, 1983	16.9 / 25 / #30
Dick Cavett (himself) enters the bar and meets Sam, whom he recognizes as a former baseball player. Dick suggests that Sam should write an autobiography. The next day, Diane's biography of Sam—which she wrote under the pseudonym Jessica Simpson-Bourget—is rejected by Dick's publisher for not being controversial enough. As Cavett recommends, Diane reluctantly writes more about Sam's sex life in order to get the book published. Wally (Walter Olkewicz), Norm's old high school wrestling rival, dates Norm's ex-wife Vera. Jealous Norm and Wally wrestle for hours until Coach declares Norm the winner. However, Norm reluctantly approves Wally and Vera. When one of Coach's old teammates dies after becoming unfit, Coach begins an exercise program.
32	10	"How Do I Love Thee, Let Me Call You Back"	James Burrows	Earl Pomerantz	December 8, 1983	16.4 / 25 / #28
Sam tell Diane that he loves her; Diane is romantically awestruck until Sam tells her that it was a casual remark that he often says to others, including other women and Coach. Diane and Sam argue and then break up for one week. After time passes, Sam says "ditto" to Diane, which does not impress her. Enraged with her inappreciativeness, Sam tries to literally and comprehensively say, "I love you," but his ineptitude is obvious, which ironically impresses her.
33	11	"Just Three Friends"	James Burrows	David Lloyd	December 15, 1983	16.0 / 26 / #34
Diane's old friend Heather (Markie Post), who has recently moved to Boston, flirts with Sam, who takes it as a sexual overture. However, she and Heather tell him that Heather's flirtations were meant as a compliment. The three make up and plan to have dinner at Diane's apartment. Carla convinces Diane that Sam and Heather may be sexually attracted to each other, making Diane paranoid. During dinner at her apartment, Diane accuses Heather of flirting with Sam. Heather regrets going to Diane's apartment for dinner and decides to leave. Diane realizes her error, apologizes to Heather for her misunderstandings, and tells her that they are still best friends. Coach brings a ferocious dog to Cheers and locks it in the bar office. Norm gives the dog an alcoholic cocktail in attempt to sedate it, but the dog becomes amorous while drunk.
34	12	"Where There's a Will..."	James Burrows	Nick Arnold	December 22, 1983	18.3 / 27 / #15
Beloved Malcolm Kramer (George Gaynes), who has six months to live, gives a signed will of $100,000 inheritance to Cheers' patrons. When people become greedy, Sam apparently burns the will, disappointing all except Diane, who is glad that the madness has stopped. Sam had burned a copy of the will and still retains the original one. Diane berates him for crossing his friends, so Sam burns the paper before her eyes. Suspecting that Sam has tricked her again, Diane warns him that anyone responsible for such a devious trick would be eternally guilty. Infuriated by her morals, Sam reluctantly burns the actual will.
35	13	"Battle of the Exes"	James Burrows	Ken Estin & Sam Simon	January 5, 1984	19.6 / 28 / #23
Carla wants to bring a date to the wedding of her ex-husband Nick (Dan Hedaya), soon to be married to ditzy blond Loretta (Jean Kasem). With no one available, prompting Carla to almost decline, Sam poses as Carla's boyfriend. After the wedding, Nick begs Carla to start a relationship again, but she refuses in favor of Sam. Nick kisses her, but Carla tells him that the spark is already gone. When Nick leaves, Carla weeps and tells Sam that the kiss reignited the spark. Then Sam and Carla passionately kiss, which befuddles them, but they decide they are better off as friends.
36	14	"No Help Wanted"	James Burrows	Max Tash	January 12, 1984	17.3 / 26 / #29
Norm has almost run out of unemployment funds and has reduced himself to washing dishes at Melville's. At Diane's request, Sam reluctantly hires Norm as the bar's new accountant. Norm files tax forms that claims a $15,000 tax refund. The next day, Norm finds out from a telephone call that Sam has sent the tax forms that his long-time accountant had prepared, which resulted in Sam paying about $3,000 in tax every year. Betrayed, Norm wants to leave the bar and to never return. However, then he weeps and begs Sam not to fire him. Feeling guilty, Sam rehires Norm for the next tax season, and Norm reluctantly accepts.
37	15	"And Coachie Makes Three"	James Burrows	Heide Perlman	January 19, 1984	18.5 / 27 / #21
At night, Coach shows up at Diane's apartment and spoils Sam and Diane's attempt at sex. Rather than throw him out, they reluctantly let him stay. This causes Coach to constantly hang out with the couple, allowing them no private time. Sam and Diane set Coach up with Katherine (Eve Roberts)—a woman from the bank. After Coach drops Katherine at the bus stop, he returns to Diane's apartment to watch television. Sam and Diane reluctantly tell Coach not to bother them anymore. The next day, Sam and Diane regret their actions until, to their relief, Coach tells them that he had a wonderful evening with Katherine at her place and would like to see her again.
38	16	"Cliff's Rocky Moment"	James Burrows	David Lloyd	January 26, 1984	19.3 / 29 / #20
Victor (Peter Iacangelo), a Cheers patron, confronts Cliff for his know-it-all attitude and challenges him to a fight. Cliff runs off and, the following day, unsuccessfully attempts to have someone else fight on Cliff's behalf. Later, Victor demands that Cliff either admit he is a liar and a coward, or leave the bar and never return. Cliff disappoints his friends by leaving the bar. After Sam kicks Victor out, the regulars are surprised when Cliff returns with bricks and a piece of wood to prove that he has practiced karate. Cliff kicks the wood and then breaks a brick with his head, making the crowd cheer. Cliff secretly tells Diane that he has never practiced karate and asked to be taken to the hospital. While his friends review the broken pieces, Diane quietly struggles to carry Cliff outside the bar. Meanwhile, Diane has beaten Sam consecutively in betting on American football teams, outraging Sam.
39	17	"Fortune and Men's Weight"	James Burrows	Heide Perlman	February 2, 1984	13.1 / 19 / #51
Everyone tries out a 40-year-old fortune-telling machine that was bought by Coach. Norm's fortune says "Your most troublesome problem will soon be solved." One night, Norm discovers that his "blind date"—set up by a friend—is his ex-wife Vera. Norm and Vera have sex and reconcile their marriage. Sam and Diane deny that these fulfilled predictions are anything more than mere coincidences. However, Diane becomes concerned when her fortune says "Deception in romance proves costly." At closing time the next day, Diane tells Sam about a platonic evening with her male classmate, with whom she shares interests. Sam feels betrayed and argues with her, bringing them to the cusp of a breakup. Infuriated, Sam kicks the machine, which immediately ejects a card. Deciding that the message will decide the fate of their relationship, they're shocked to read "Machine empty. Order more fortunes today."
40	18	"Snow Job"	James Burrows	David Angell	February 9, 1984	17.1 / 25 / #26
Diane learns that, in the past, Sam sought women at ski trips with his friends in Stowe, Vermont. Sam enters the bar and tells Diane that he is going to Vermont for the "funeral" of his uncle Nathan, supposedly killed by a bus in a hit-and-run accident. Not wanting to fall for Sam's lies, Diane says she'll scrutinize obituaries to confirm the death of Sam's uncle. To prevent her from doing so, Sam admits that the funeral and Uncle Nathan are nonexistent. Diane admits that she knew the whole situation all along and did not read obituaries to catch him out. Sam threatens to go on the trip anyway, but he returns seconds later, just as everyone predicted. Norm befriends George Foley (James Gallery)—another unemployed man—making Cliff jealous. George ditches Norm at a hockey game, causing Norm to remember who his real friend is. Coach tries to break his record of fewest glasses broken, but is denied when he slips on a banana peel.
41	19	"Coach Buries a Grudge"	James Burrows	David Lloyd	February 16, 1984	14.6 / 21 / #33
Coach returns from his old friend T-Bone's funeral in Phoenix, Arizona and decides to hold T-Bone's memorial in the bar, as Diane suggests. He overhears Sam revealing that T-Bone once made a pass at Coach's wife Angela, enraging him. At the memorial, Coach discovers that T-Bone did the same to another man's wife and did inappropriate things to Coach's friends. He and his old friends become angry and try to dishonor T-Bone by destroying a cardboard picture of him. However, when they hear Diane sing "Amazing Grace", they quell their anger and sing along. Norm learns from Vera that her parents, who disdain him for being unemployed, have already arrived at Norm and Vera's house, so he claims employment search to avoid his in-laws.
42	20	"Norman's Conquest"	James Burrows	Lissa Levin	February 23, 1984	17.2 / 26 / #22
Married Norm is attracted to his client Emily Phillips (Anne Schedeen). Rather than seduce her, Norm drops Emily off at her apartment and suddenly leaves. In the billiard room, Norm tells Sam that he loves Vera, who is the only woman he wants for life, especially during the 11-year marriage. Diane encourages Norm to stand up for Vera. However, Norm later tells his bar mates his jokes about Vera to cover-up his feelings for her, disappointing Diane.
43	21	"I'll Be Seeing You"	James Burrows	Glen Charles & Les Charles	May 3, 1984	13.9 / 21 / #32
44	22	"I'll Be Seeing You"	James Burrows	Glen Charles & Les Charles	May 10, 1984	13.6 / 22 / #30
Part 1: Diane learns that Sam has concealed their relationship from the Boston Magazine, which includes him on its "20 Most Eligible Bachelors" list. To make peace with Diane, Sam takes Carla's suggestion that he commission a portrait of Diane by an artist Cliff knows. Philip Semenko (Christopher Lloyd), a pretentious artist who insults Sam and his lack of originality, becomes attracted to Diane. Sam fires Philip, but the artist, who Diane recognizes and admires, decides to paint an original portrait of her. Sam warns her that, if she does anything with Philip, their relationship will end. Coach fails to encourage unenthusiastic bar patrons into signing up for picnic and softball, and Norm warns his friends to stay away from a new restaurant—the Hungry Heifer—for its bad service and bad food. Part 2: A week passes: Coach resorts to do the "pathetic old man" trick, prompting unenthusiastic bar patrons into signing up for the picnic and softball. Norm still dislikes the Hungry Heifer, but he often dines there to take advantage of its special offers. Sam discovers that Diane has betrayed him by commissioning Philip to paint her portrait—which she brings in—and chides her for it. Tired and exhausted, she contends that her relationship with Sam "has always been a contest of wills" and has degraded into immaturity. As she is leaving, Sam orders her to leave and never return. Without Diane around, Sam unwraps Philip's painting and says, "Wow!".

== Ratings ==
The second season of Cheers was scheduled against CBS's Simon & Simon and various ABC programs, including the short-lived sitcom It's Not Easy and short-lived medical drama Trauma Center. The season scored an average rating of 17.6 and achieved a 27% audience share in its first seven weeks. At the end of the season, Cheers finished in 35th place in the Nielsen ratings, a considerable improvement over its debut season, which finished under top 70.

== Reception ==
This season was reviewed at the time of its first broadcast on NBC. According to April 26, 1984, survey from The Philadelphia Inquirer (polled by almost 5,000 people) and an April 1984 survey from The Cincinnati Enquirer, Cheers was one of the top ten favorite programs. David Bianculli from Knight Ridder news agency praised it as "the best comedy on TV". Ron Miller and Steve Sonsky from the same news agency gave the same praise. Sonsky said the show was hilarious, unrealistic, absurd, superbly crafted and " ... its just the way comedy should be: comic exaggeration built on a grain of truth you can identify with".

Other reviews were less than positive. According to Sonsky, Harry Stein writing for TV Guide said Cheers and shows like it are "destructive". Sonsky wrote that Stein and other critics "call[s] such shows to task for failing to display ... commendable and enduring relationships, based on trust and moral values". Mike Boone from the Montreal newspaper The Gazette wrote that the romance between Sam and Diane lasted far too long, spoiled the atmosphere of the bar, and transformed the supporting cast into a "Greek chorus of concerned bystanders". Fred Rothenberg from Associated Press said the program's second season "had some great shows, but dwelled incessantly on the conflict between Sam and Diane without developing the other characters .

Twenty years after the series was first broadcast, reviews grew more positive. Adam Arseneau from DVD Verdict gave the series a rating of 90 percent on the story and 93 percent on acting. Shannon Nutt from DVD Talk rated it four stars out of five for content. Kyle Crawford from TheBoxSet.com called it "smartly written and well acted". Robert David Sullivan ranked the two-part season finale "I'll Be Seeing You" at number four in his list of top 100 favorite sitcom episodes, and wrote that trying to change each other and hurting each other—physically or emotionally—took its toll on Sam and Diane's relationship. The A.V. Club graded "I'll Be Seeing You" A−. Meredith Blake of that website wrote that a fight scene—which she described as a "[t]hree Stooges-esque nose-pinching, face-slapping farce"—is "sublimely well-executed, but it also has a troubling subtext". Blake added, "[w]hen Diane expresses her shock over the violence, Sam fires back that he hadn't hit her as hard as he wanted to. It sounds less like a defense of his behavior than a confession to even darker emotions." TV Guide named "How Do I Love Thee... Let Me Call You Back" a "classic episode".

== Production ==
In response to criticism on Diane and Sam's relationship, Cheers' creators said that they still entertained viewers without diminishing the show's quality and going out of character. Les Charles, the co-creator, co-writer, and producer of Cheers, said that the on-and-off relationship between Sam and Diane would evolve into consummation and was never meant to last. Charles said that Sam and Diane have strong chemistry but incompatible backgrounds. Glen Charles said that Sam and Diane still antagonize each other, no matter what the state of relationship. Director James Burrows said that pairing Diane and Sam was not a mistake and that keeping them apart for the whole season would have been worse. The cliffhanger after their breakup in the two-part season finale "I'll Be Seeing You" was intended so that "[t]he audience will have all summer to wonder whether Sam will ever see Diane again", said Charles. Meanwhile, writers planned to give Diane another love interest for the next season.

On August 25, 1983, a fire broke out at Paramount Studios where Cheers was filmed. Two or three sound stages and four outdoor sets were destroyed; the show's production set and the rest of the studios were unharmed. Diane's apartment is the first place outside the bar to appear on screen since the season premiere "Power Play". John Ratzenberger, who appeared frequently as a guest star in the first season, was billed in the second season as a permanent character on the opening credits. In 1984, NBC renewed the show for its third season (1984–1985).

== Accolades ==
Cheers received twelve Emmy Award nominations for the 1983–84 season and won four, including Outstanding Comedy Series. Rhea Perlman won Outstanding Supporting Actress in a Comedy Series, David Angell won Outstanding Writing in a Comedy Series for "Old Flames", and Andrew Chulack won Outstanding Film Editing for a Series. Cheers received three Golden Globe nominations for Best Musical/Comedy Series of 1983; Best Actor in a Musical/Comedy Series (Ted Danson), and Best Actress in a Musical/Comedy Series (Shelley Long); neither were won in 1984. Of the nominees for 1984, Shelley Long won a Golden Globe in 1985 as the Best Actress in a Musical/Comedy Series.

== DVD and Blu-ray release ==
This season was released into Region 1 DVD on January 6, 2004, almost twenty years its first television broadcast. Adam Arseneau of DVD Verdict rated the video 91 percent. He rated audio 84 percent and found it "less spectacular".

The second season did not receive its own separate release on Blu-ray. It was released as part of the Cheers: The Complete Series box set on April 25, 2023, with the DVD special features intact.

Cheers: The Complete Second Season
Set Details		Special Features
22 episodes; 4-disc set; 1:33:1 aspect ratio; English - Stereo; Closed captioning (Region 1); Subtitles: Danish, English, Spanish, French, Italian, Norwegian, Swedish (Region 2)		Strictly Top Shelf: The Guys Behind The Bar; Cliff's Notes: The Wisdom of Cliff Clavin; Carla The Comeback Queen: Insults For Every Occasion; Di Another Day: Diane Chambers From A-Z; Gag Reel: Bloopers From Season 2
Release Dates
Region 1	Region 2	Region 4
January 6, 2004	24 June 2004	5 May 2004
