= Coach's Daughter =

- Cheers episode
- Episode no.: Season 1 Episode 5
- Directed by: James Burrows
- Written by: Ken Estin
- Original air dates: October 28, 1982 (Continental U.S.); November 11, 1982 (Alaska)
- Running time: 24:54 (DVD)

Guest appearances
- Allyce Beasley as Lisa Pantusso; Philip Charles MacKenzie as Roy

Episode chronology
← Previous "Sam at Eleven"	Next → "Any Friend of Diane's"
- Cheers (season 1)

"Coach's Daughter" is the fifth episode of the American television sitcom Cheers, written by Ken Estin and directed by James Burrows. It first aired on NBC on October 28, 1982. This episode guest stars Allyce Beasley as Coach's daughter, Lisa Pantusso. In this episode, Lisa arrives with her fiancé Roy, who is boorish and obnoxious and rude to her, causing Coach to resent him.

When it first aired, this episode scored very low Nielsen ratings; however, network reruns of this episode improved. Although it did not earn award nominations, it has been praised as a favorite by critics and cast alike, including the late Nicholas Colasanto.

== Plot ==
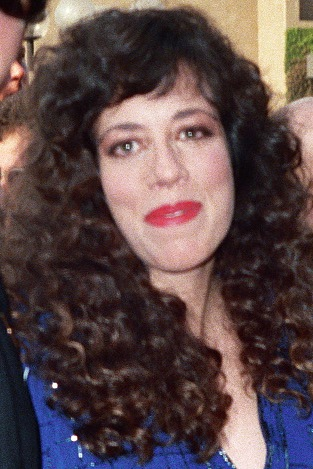
Allyce Beasley portrays Coach's daughter, Lisa Pantusso, in this episode.

Coach Ernie Pantusso's daughter, Lisa, a district manager of her company, arrives with her fiancé Roy, a door-to-door salesman who works for her company but turns out to be abrasive and insensitive. (Note: Lisa personally characterizes Roy during her conversation with Coach in the office.) Repulsed by Roy's obnoxious, boorish personality and insults toward people, including Lisa, Coach finds Roy not good enough for her. However, Coach is too reluctant to tell her about Roy because she appears to like him and wants her father's blessings. To make matters worse, at Melville's restaurant, Roy forces her to pay for dinner herself, angering Coach.

Unable to keep silent, Coach escorts Lisa into an office and openly refuses to let Lisa marry someone who treats her badly, like Roy. Lisa admits that she knows this about Roy and that Roy wants to marry her merely for business reasons. Then Lisa reluctantly tells Coach that, despite all that, she wants to have a family of her own, that Roy is the first man in her life to propose, but she fears will be the last. Coach, shocked with disbelief, tells her that she's "beautiful", but Lisa objects and begs him for one moment to look at her and see what she really is. Coach then realizes and tells Lisa how much she resembles her mother, (Note: Coach's wife died before the show premiered in 1982.) who Lisa said was not "comfortable about her [own] beauty." Coach tells Lisa that she is more beautiful every day, regardless of her appearance, just as her mother was more beautiful every day.

Lisa, feeling self-confident from her talk with Coach, tells Roy that she does not want to marry him because she finds him "more and more obnoxious." Roy vows that he will be "gone" as he exits the bar. Lisa prepares to celebrate her freedom from Roy with Coach, as they leave the bar. Meanwhile, Diane Chambers draws sketches of people, but her efforts show no resemblance to their subjects.

== Production ==
Ken Levine remarked that the whole audience laughed during the filming of an office scene between Coach and his daughter at the end of the episode. It was reshot but the audience still laughed. Glen and Les Charles decided to lift the laughter from the office scene, so it is not heard in the final cut. Before portraying Tim—a minor recurring character—in multiple episodes, Tim Cunningham portrays Chuck, who works at the lab that mutates viruses. Jacqueline Cassel and Teddy Bergeron are credited as a couple, to whom Diane shows her botched artwork.

== Reception ==
=== Ratings ===
This episode first aired on NBC on October 28, 1982, at 9:00pm Eastern/Pacific (8:00pm Central/Mountain), competing against CBS's Simon & Simon and ABC's Too Close for Comfort, (Note: October 28, 1982. "Television Schedule", Calendar section (Pt. VI), p. 10.) and landed on No. 66 out of 75 nationally broadcast prime time programs with an 11.0 Nielsen rating. (Note: November 4, 1982. "Television Ratings", Calendar section (Part VI), page 12. A rating is based on 83.3 million households with at least one television set.) In Alaska, it aired on November 11, 1982, at 8:00pm AKT.

This episode subsequently aired on NBC on March 10, 1983, at 9:30pm ET/PT (8:30pm CT/MT), competing against Simon & Simon and It Takes Two, (Note: March 10, 1983. "Television Schedule", Calendar section (Pt. VI), p. 8.) and landed on No. 42 out of 72 nationally broadcast programs with the 14.8 rating. (Note: March 17, 1983. "Television Ratings", Calendar section (Pt. VI). A rating is based on 83.3 million households with at least one television set.) It aired again on NBC on July 7, 1983, at 9:30pm ET/PT (8:30pm CT/MT), competing against a rerun of Simon & Simon and ABC's two-hour television movie, The Last Ninja, and landed on No. 21 out of 66 nationally broadcast programs with a 12.9 rating and 23 share.

=== Critical reaction ===
You couldn't hear a pin drop the night we filmed it. It is one of those rare times when the emotions dug so deeply. It was an event.

— John Ratzenberger, USA Today, May 1993.

Reviews have been positive. It is considered one of the favorites of cast and crew who were involved with this episode, including Allyce Beasley (Note: King, Susan. "With An Eye On...: The Beast In Beasley Finally Emerges In 'The Tommyknockers'." May 9, 1993. Web. June 8, 2012.) and especially the late Nicholas Colasanto. George Wendt and John Ratzenberger—who portrayed Norm and Cliff, respectively—considered it one of their personal favorites, mainly because of the office scene between Coach and his daughter. R.D. Heldenfels from The Sunday Gazette called the office scene "poignant." Robert Bianco of The Pittsburgh Press praised this episode as one of his favorites and called its office scene between Coach and his daughter "tender".

Many reviewers at The A.V. Club agreed that the scene between Coach and his daughter at the office is the most redeeming part of the episode, but they have mixed feelings about the rest of the episode. Ryan McGee found this episode too draggy and found Coach's daughter—Lisa—underdeveloped. Meredith Blake found this episode "underwhelming". Others praised this episode overall, including moments outside the story of Coach's daughter. Erik Adams observed that Coach can immediately sense a bad aspect about Roy, even when Coach is a "simpleton".

== Aftermath ==
Glen and Les Charles wanted this episode Emmy-nominated for Outstanding Writing for a Comedy Series, but Ken Estin, writer of this episode, declined. (Estin was working simultaneously on Taxi, and as he was permitted only to submit one episode to the nominating committee for consideration, he submitted a Taxi script instead.)

Before appearing as a receptionist for a fictional detective agency in the television show, Moonlighting, Allyce Beasley had not found other roles for one year after this episode, according to Beasley herself.

== In popular culture ==
This episode is referenced in the novel American Gods by Neil Gaiman. In the novel, the main character is revealed to have watched this episode, particularly the office scene between Coach and his daughter. Later, gods contact him by controlling Carla, Cliff, and Diane via broadcast of this episode.
