= Cheers season 3 =

Cheers
- Season 3
- Region 1 DVD
- Showrunners: Ken Estin; Sam Simon
- Starring: Ted Danson; Shelley Long; Nicholas Colasanto; Rhea Perlman; John Ratzenberger; George Wendt
- No. of episodes: 25

Release
- Original network: NBC
- Original release: September 27, 1984 – May 9, 1985

Season chronology
- ← Previous; Season 2 Next → Season 4

The third season of the American television sitcom Cheers aired on NBC from September 27, 1984 to May 9, 1985. The show was created by director James Burrows and writers Glen and Les Charles under production team Charles Burrows Charles Productions in association with Paramount Television. The third season is available on DVD in a four-disc set.

The season marks major events that affected, or could have affected, the show. Kelsey Grammer made his debut as psychiatrist Frasier Crane, intended as part of a love triangle with Sam and Diane for the season. Actresses Rhea Perlman and Shelley Long were pregnant; Perlman's pregnancy was written into the arc of her character (Carla Tortelli), while Long's was hidden to avoid disrupting the development of her character (Diane Chambers). This was the final season for Nicholas Colasanto as Coach Ernie Pantusso; Colasanto died of a heart condition (dating back to the 1970s) which worsened during production, contributing to his absence from a number of episodes before his death in February 1985.

== Background ==
During the preceding two years NBC had struggled to put together a successful Thursday lineup, introducing "The Best Night of Television on Television." The initial lineup included the critically acclaimed comedy Cheers and crime series Hill Street Blues. Except for Hill Street Blues, the other series received low Nielsen ratings. A number of shows, including critically panned sitcoms, were tried and replaced over the years. NBC renewed Cheers for a second season; the show's ratings improved during summer 1983, and the second season received higher ratings. Cheers won awards (including Emmys) for both seasons.

The 1984–85 Thursday lineup consisted of—in time-slot order beginning at 8 pm Eastern (7 pm Central)—a new sitcom (The Cosby Show), three renewed sitcoms (Family Ties, Cheers and Night Court) and the renewed Hill Street Blues. This lineup received high Nielsen ratings for the entire season, beating other Thursday shows from CBS and ABC.

== Cast and characters ==
- Sam Malone (Ted Danson): Bartender, bar owner, ex-athlete
- Diane Chambers (Shelley Long): often pretentious college-student, and waitress, the moral compass of the bar
- Ernie "Coach" Pantusso (Nicholas Colasanto): Retired coach and bartender. After Colasanto's death, the absence of his character in later episodes is explained by various events.
- Carla Tortelli (Rhea Perlman): Bitter waitress, divorced mother of six and Nick's ex-wife.
- Cliff Clavin (John Ratzenberger): unmarried, U.S. postman, and bar know-it-all
- Norm Peterson (George Wendt): Underemployed accountant who (with his wife, Vera) attempts to conceive a child
- Frasier Crane (Kelsey Grammer): Psychiatrist and Diane's significant other
  Recurring throughout Seasons 3 and 4 with his appearances becoming more frequent. Grammer is finally credited in the opening credits beginning in Season 5.

After the "end" of the on-off relationship between Sam and Diane in the previous season, Sam begins drinking again and indulges in a series of affairs; Diane quits, signing herself into a mental hospital to forget Sam. She meets upper-class psychiatrist Frasier Crane, and begins dating him. Months later, Diane returns to her apartment and learns about Sam's relapse from Coach. With help from Diane, Frasier and Coach, Sam recovers. At first Diane decides not to work as a waitress again, but Coach tells her if she does not return to the bar Sam will relapse again. Coach also tells Sam that Diane will lose her mind again, and tells Frasier that if Diane and Sam are apart they would yearn for each other. As a result, Diane returns to work at the bar as a waitress. While she is dating Frasier, she and Sam flirt with each other.

Diane and Frasier decide to elope in Europe, leaving Sam heartbroken once more. One night at the bar Sam and Diane are close to making love again, but realize they are uncertain about their future together. Before Diane leaves, Sam tells her to call him if she wants to make love again. Weeks later Sam, regretting letting Diane go, takes a plane to Italy (with Cliff's help) to stop her from marrying Frasier.

== Episodes ==
No. overall	No. in season	Title	Directed by	Written by	Original release date	Rating/share/rank (households)
45	1	"Rebound"	James Burrows	Glen Charles & Les Charles	September 27, 1984	20.7 / 32 / #7
46	2	"Rebound"	James Burrows	Glen Charles & Les Charles	October 4, 1984	19.5 / 29 / #13
After the breakup between Sam and Diane in the season-two finale, "I'll Be Seeing You", Sam has been drinking and womanizing for months. After Diane left, the bar went through eight other waitresses (with whom Sam slept, leaving Carla and Coach to run Cheers). When Diane returns home from a sanitarium (where she went to forget Sam), she learns about Sam's relapse from Coach and asks her psychiatrist friend Frasier Crane to help Sam recover. Sam thinks Diane still has feelings for him, not knowing that Diane and Frasier are romantically involved. Norm and Vera want to have a child. Cliff comes back from a two-week vacation in Florida, annoying everyone with his stories. After 10 days of sobriety and counseling with Frasier, Sam regains his stability and learns from Diane that she and Frasier are dating (smashing his hopes of being reunited with her). At first Diane refuses to be a waitress again (much to Sam and Frasier's relief), even when the position is available. However, Coach tells Diane that her refusal would cause Sam to relapse, he tells Sam it would make Diane go crazy again, and tells Frasier that it would make Sam and Diane yearn for each other. Diane reluctantly accepts Sam's offer, and they promise to resist each other. This two-parter marks the first appearance of Kelsey Grammer as Frasier Crane.
47	3	"I Call Your Name"	James Burrows	Peter Casey & David Lee	October 18, 1984	18.6 / 28 / #17
After closing time, Frasier comes into the bar asks Sam's advice about a patient, whose girlfriend shouted out an old lover's name during sex. Sam correctly deduces Frasier is discussing himself and Diane. The next day, Sam broaches his theory to Diane in the office. Frasier walks in, and Diane angrily chides him for telling Sam the story. Frasier believes that Sam and Diane are still attracted to each other; they deny it, Diane insisting that Frasier is the man of her dreams. When Frasier leaves, Diane admits still having feelings for Sam, only to call out Frasier's name when they kiss, much to Sam's fury. Cliff secretly reports fellow mailman Lewis (Sam Scarber) on the theft of fragrance samples from magazines, which gets Lewis fired. Lewis deduces that Cliff was the snitch, but decides not to beat him up, as he's found another job. Sam Scarber portrayed Lewis in a previous episode "Cliff's Rocky Moment" (season 2, episode 16).
48	4	"Fairy Tales Can Come True"	James Burrows	Sam Simon	October 25, 1984	19.8 / 30 / #14
During a costume party at Cheers, Cliff (dressed as Ponce de León) meets his shy, female counterpart—Sharon O'Hare (Bernadette Birkett), dressed as Tinker Bell—and is attracted to her. The following day, at Norm's encouragement, Cliff reveals himself unmasked to the unmasked Sharon. Frasier departs to another city for a seminar, and cannot accompany Diane to the Boston Pops Orchestra concert of George Gershwin music. At Frasier's suggestion, Diane takes Sam to the concert for a "non-romantic[,] friendly" evening free of sexual tension. Bernadette Birkett, George Wendt's real-life wife, would later appear in an episode "Thanksgiving Orphans" uncredited as Norm's wife Vera in a body appearance sans the face covered with a pumpkin pie.
49	5	"Sam Turns the Other Cheek"	James Burrows	David Lloyd	November 1, 1984	17.8 / 27 / #19
When Sam calms down Maxine's (Kim Lankford) jealous husband Marvin (Carmen Argenziano) and retrieves his gun, he accidentally shoots himself in the buttock while putting it into his back pocket. Rather than admit what really happened, Sam tells everyone an elaborate lie about his heroism in foiling a gang of robbers, although Diane does not believe him. At closing time, angry after seeing Sam's lies told on TV, Marvin returns with a gun and holds Sam and Diane hostage. Diane falsely claims herself and Sam as still a couple, so Marvin spares Sam's life for Diane's sake. Cliff gives a lowball offer for Norm's house and is shocked when Norm gladly accepts. Carla tells about her seduction of the dentist treating her toothache.
50	6	"Coach in Love"	James Burrows	David Angell	November 8, 1984	16.7 / 25 / #19
51	7	"Coach in Love"	James Burrows	David Angell	November 15, 1984	19.2 / 29 / #15
Part 1: Coach dates Irene Blanchard (Bette Ford). Days later, he proposes to her, and she accepts. When she hears of the $2-million lottery winnings from her daughter Sue (Ellen Regan), Irene immediately forgets the proposal. When Diane returns Sam's things to him that were left behind when they broke up, Diane discovers that her hand-puppet, Brian the Lion, was used as a bar rag and that her hand-spun lamb's-wool sweater was ruined when Sam put it in the washing machine. Part 2: After Coach's girlfriend Irene wins the lottery, she becomes a socialite and breaks up with him. Coach learns from her daughter Sue that Irene is engaged to a foreign millionaire. Undaunted, Coach proceeds with the wedding plans, only to be stood up at the altar. When the phone rings, Coach picks it up and tells the caller (assuming to be Irene) that their relationship is over and she is better off with the rich man. When he leaves, the phone rings again and is left unanswered (again assuming that it is Irene).
52	8	"Diane Meets Mom"	James Burrows	David Lloyd	November 22, 1984	14.4 / 25 / #38
Frasier's mother, Hester (Nancy Marchand), threatens Diane with violence if she continues seeing him. Convinced that Hester may be joking, Diane makes some joking threats to Hester in return, which are met with horror. When Frasier drags both women into the office, Diane tells him about Hester's threats, and Hester explains that she made it in fear of losing Frasier. Although the dispute seems settled, unbeknownst to Diane and Frasier, Hester unsuccessfully tries bribing Sam into dating Diane again. On Norm's birthday, he is hit on the forehead by a wine cork when Coach opens the bottle. At the hospital, test results show the injury is not serious; however, Norm arranges a procedure to remove a mole (which increases the hospital charges to $683) and sticks Sam with the bill. Hester Crane would later appear in flashback scenes within the spinoff, Frasier, portrayed by different actress, Rita Wilson.
53	9	"An American Family"	James Burrows	Heide Perlman	November 29, 1984	20.5 / 30 / #15
Nick's (Dan Hedaya) new wife Loretta (Jean Kasem) is unable to conceive, so Nick demands custody of Anthony (one of Carla's children). Carla refuses, but Nick seduces her into agreeing. When Carla is ready to sign the custody papers, the gang tells her to resist Nick's charm; she changes her mind and keeps Anthony. Cliff, Norm, and Coach attempt to one up each other on frivolous bets about Sam's batting average.
54	10	"Diane's Allergy"	James Burrows	David Lloyd	December 6, 1984	20.0 / 17 / #20
After moving in with Frasier, Diane develops an allergy and thinks his puppy Pavlov is the cause. Sam and Frasier think that moving into Frasier's place (not the puppy) caused the allergy, but Frasier gives the puppy to Sam (who renames it Diane). Although Frasier's place is sanitized and renovated, Diane is still allergic, and Frasier misses his puppy. Diane overhears her name, unaware that Frasier is referring to his dog, and concludes it as his love "confession". Carla is disappointed that all her birthday presents are gag gifts.
55	11	"Peterson Crusoe"	James Burrows	David Angell	December 13, 1984	18.8 / 29 / #21
Norm is worried about his mortality because an X-ray showed a spot on his chest, and is relieved to hear that the X-ray was flawed. Because of the near-death experience, however, he announces that he is going to Bora Bora. A week later (with his trip a failure), Norm is found to have been hiding in the office the entire time. The gang tells Norm about their own failures to achieve their dreams, including Cliff's dream of becoming a trapeze artist. Carla and Diane compete for the most tips.
56	12	"A Ditch in Time"	James Burrows	Ken Estin	December 20, 1984	17.4 / 26 / #20
After his first date with Diane's friend Amanda (Carol Kane), Sam learns that Diane and Amanda met at the mental hospital and Amanda is obsessive, manipulative and self-destructive about men. When Sam attempts to end things with her, she threatens suicide. To rescue Sam, Diane informs Amanda that Sam was the boyfriend she complained about during her hospital therapy. Amanda storms off in disgust, leaving Sam to reconsider how he had treated Diane during their relationship. Norm and the gang list names for Norm and Vera's future child (omitting Cliff and Clifford, to Cliff's disappointment). In some syndication prints, the brief reference to "Snow Job" is omitted.
57	13	"Whodunit?"	James Burrows	Tom Reeder	January 3, 1985	18.4 / 26 / #21
Frasier's mentor Bennett Ludlow (James Karen) is infatuated with the tough-talking, brash Carla. They begin dating, and she becomes pregnant. She breaks up with Bennett, rejecting his proposal, but he promises to financially support her and their child.
58	14	"The Heart Is a Lonely Snipehunter"	James Burrows	Heide Perlman	January 10, 1985	19.9 / 27 / #18
When Frasier is bored with his work, Diane encourages the guys (including Sam) to invite him to their "guys only" weekend. Because he is dull they abandon him, leaving him snipe hunting alone. He returns, apparently happy to be part of the gang (which worries Diane). However, he tells her he knew the game was fabricated and plans to retaliate.
59	15	"King of the Hill"	James Burrows	Elliot Shoenman	January 24, 1985	18.7 / 28 / #22
Sam wins 7–0 against Playboy Playmates in a charity softball game to everyone's displeasure, including the men who only wanted to ogle his opponents. Sensing the mood, Sam withdraws to the poolroom. Diane joins him, telling him he is overcompetitive in everything he does. Sam retaliates by accusing her of being as competitive as he is. They play ping pong until closing time, ending the game in a draw. The actual Playmates of the Month—Ola Ray, Heidi Sorenson, and Jeana Tomasina—portrayed their own named fictional counterparts with spoken lines and were credited. The episode "The Boys in the Bar" reaired on January 17, 1985.
60	16	"Teacher's Pet"	James Burrows	Tom Reeder	January 31, 1985	20.6 /29 / #13
To earn his high-school diploma, Sam sleeps with his attractive instructor for higher grades in a geography class. Diane finds out when Coach (taking the same class and receiving honest grades) mentions that Sam is uncooperative and does not study. Confronted by Diane, Sam calls the teacher to end the affair and to grade his final exam honestly. Since he did not study, Coach tutors him, allowing Sam to earn his diploma with an honest "D" grade. Cliff wants his ears redone, but then decides to leave them as they are mostly because his insurance does not cover it.
61	17	"The Mail Goes to Jail"	James Burrows	David Lloyd	February 7, 1985	18.2 / 26 / #22
The day is cold and snowy; the bar's furnace is broken; the repairman is unable to come. Rather than stand around suffering from cold temperature, Diane goes inside the vent to troubleshoot and then gets stuck. Cliff has the flu, so Norm illegally substitutes for him and is arrested for tampering with the mail. To save his job, Cliff denies his connection to Norm to the police officer (Troy Evans). Pressured by the gang, Cliff eventually tells his superiors the truth. Due to his clean record he is only suspended for 30 days. Released from jail, infuriated Norm tries to attack him and is restrained by Sam. Cliff admits his mistake, prompting Norm to forgive him (after making Cliff imitate a seal, with his pants down). This was the final episode to air during Nicholas Colasanto's lifetime, and he died five days after this episode aired.
62	18	"Bar Bet"	James Burrows	Jim Parker	February 14, 1985	21.3 / 32 / #9
Due to a drunken bar bet, Eddie Gordon (Michael Richards) will obtain the bar from his old drinking buddy Sam unless Sam can marry the actress Jacqueline Bisset by midnight the next day. Although the court would void the contract because he signed it while intoxicated, Sam wants to prevent public knowledge of his relapse. The gang discovers a West Virginia woman also named Jacqueline Bisset and asks her to be Sam's bride. When Jackie reluctantly accepts the offer, Eddie agrees to call off the bet. Nicholas Colasanto does not appear in this episode. It is explained that Coach is in Vermont, getting his driver's license. This episode aired two days after Nicholas Colasanto's passing.
63	19	"Behind Every Great Man"	James Burrows	Ken Levine & David Isaacs	February 21, 1985	22.3 / 33 / #9
Sam aggressively flirts with Paula Nelson (Alison La Placa), a magazine reporter studying the Boston singles scene. Paula is not impressed, so he takes lessons in French impressionism from Diane to appear cultured. Diane assumes he is trying to win her back, and when she hears Sam making hotel reservations, she assumes he wants the two of them to go away together. Diane shows up for Cheers packed for the weekend, only to realize that Sam is taking Paula. Nicholas Colasanto does not appear in this episode. It is explained that he is at a family reunion for another family who invited him by mistake.
64	20	"If Ever I Would Leave You"	James Burrows	Ken Levine & David Isaacs	February 28, 1985	19.9 / 29 / #16
When his wife Loretta throws him out for not supporting her singing, Carla's ex-husband Nick comes to Cheers and begs her to be part of his life again. She refuses, so Nick asks to work at the bar as a cleaner to prove he is a changed man. Three weeks later, Loretta begs Nick to return to her. At first he refuses, but he realizes his mistake and dumps Carla for Loretta. Nicholas Colasanto does not appear in this episode. It is explained that Coach is at the airport, visiting his sister from Duluth, following which he'll visit her—at the Duluth airport.
65	21	"The Executive's Executioner" "Executive's Executioner Hines"	James Burrows	Heide Perlman	March 7, 1985	22.9 / 34 / #5
Norm is promoted to fire people due to his unique way of doing so. While firing several people, Norm is overcome with sorrow, prompting fired workers to cheer him up despite their own plight. Norm then becomes callous and hard, which hampers his attempt to fire an employee. Having had enough of terminating jobs, Norm tries to resign, but people are too afraid to talk to him, including his own boss. Cliff is tired of his noisy, partying neighbors and tries to send an insulting letter (written by Carla on his behalf). When his rival Walt Twitchell (Raye Birk) tries to mail the letter, Cliff changes his mind and wants it back. Walt refuses, so Cliff attacks him and rips the letter to shreds. Nicholas Colasanto does not appear in this episode.
66	22	"Cheerio, Cheers"	James Burrows	Sam Simon	April 11, 1985	20.6 / 31 / #8
Frasier is hired by the University of Bologna in Italy, and offers Diane a six-month trip to Europe. She accepts, and Sam gives her a going-away party. After the party, Sam and Diane embrace and kiss passionately, but their embrace is brief because of their uncertainty about their future together and her refusal to cheat on Frasier. Sam tells Diane that a commitment to Frasier provides "security", while passion with Sam is "a day at a time". Before she leaves, Sam tells her to call him if she wants to try again. The following day, Diane calls Sam from London to thank him for the night and promises to send him postcards from Europe. This episode (filmed in late November 1984) is Nicholas Colasanto's last appearance in a full episode. He would appear for the last time in the cold opening of the season finale "Rescue Me".
67	23	"The Bartender's Tale"	James Burrows	Sam Simon	April 18, 1985	20.1 / 31 / #6
After Carla refuses to hire attractive-but-inexperienced waitresses, Sam reluctantly hires well-liked, experienced and older Lillian Huxley (Lila Kaye). Sam is attracted to Lillian's daughter Carolyn (Camilla More). In order to prevent Carla from quitting, Sam tries to obtain Lillian's permission to date Carolyn. Lillian thinks Sam is coming on to her, but he convinces her not to go beyond their working relationship. Sam is intrigued when Lillian tells him of her prowess at lovemaking, and then discovers Carolyn detests sex as her father died of a coronary while in bed with her mother. Nicholas Colasanto does not appear in this episode.
68	24	"The Belles of St. Clete's"	James Burrows	Ken Estin	May 2, 1985	19.7 / 32 / #4
Carla is reunited with her former, sadistic principal (Camila Ashland) from St. Clete's School for Wayward Girls. Carla is determined to exact revenge on her by shaving her head, but ends up getting drunk with her (after shaving half her head). Cliff tells his barmates that a letter from Florida is from his secret admirer. Norm finds the letter, and he and Sam learn it is an angry message from a motel manager, demanding that Cliff return stolen items from his room. To save Cliff from humiliation, Norm and Sam pretend it is a love letter. Frasier and Diane rent a hotel room in the Alps, where Frasier skis and Diane calls Sam several times. Nicholas Colasanto does not appear in this episode.
69	25	"Rescue Me"	James Burrows	Ken Estin	May 9, 1985	17.9 / 30 / #13
Frasier proposes to Diane in Italy. She calls Sam in the hope that he will dissuade her from accepting, but he congratulates her. When he daydreams about stopping Diane and Frasier's wedding, Sam realizes how he really feels and Cliff helps him reserve a flight to Italy. When Frasier and Diane have car trouble in a small town, Diane secretly calls Sam, hoping he'll be on a plane to Italy. She hears Sam's voice, unaware that it is an answering machine, and Diane and Frasier decide to have a local wedding. Nicholas Colasanto appears in this episode's cold opening as Coach, using discarded footage from a previous episode. His last completed episode was "Cheerio Cheers" (filmed in late November 1984).

== Production ==
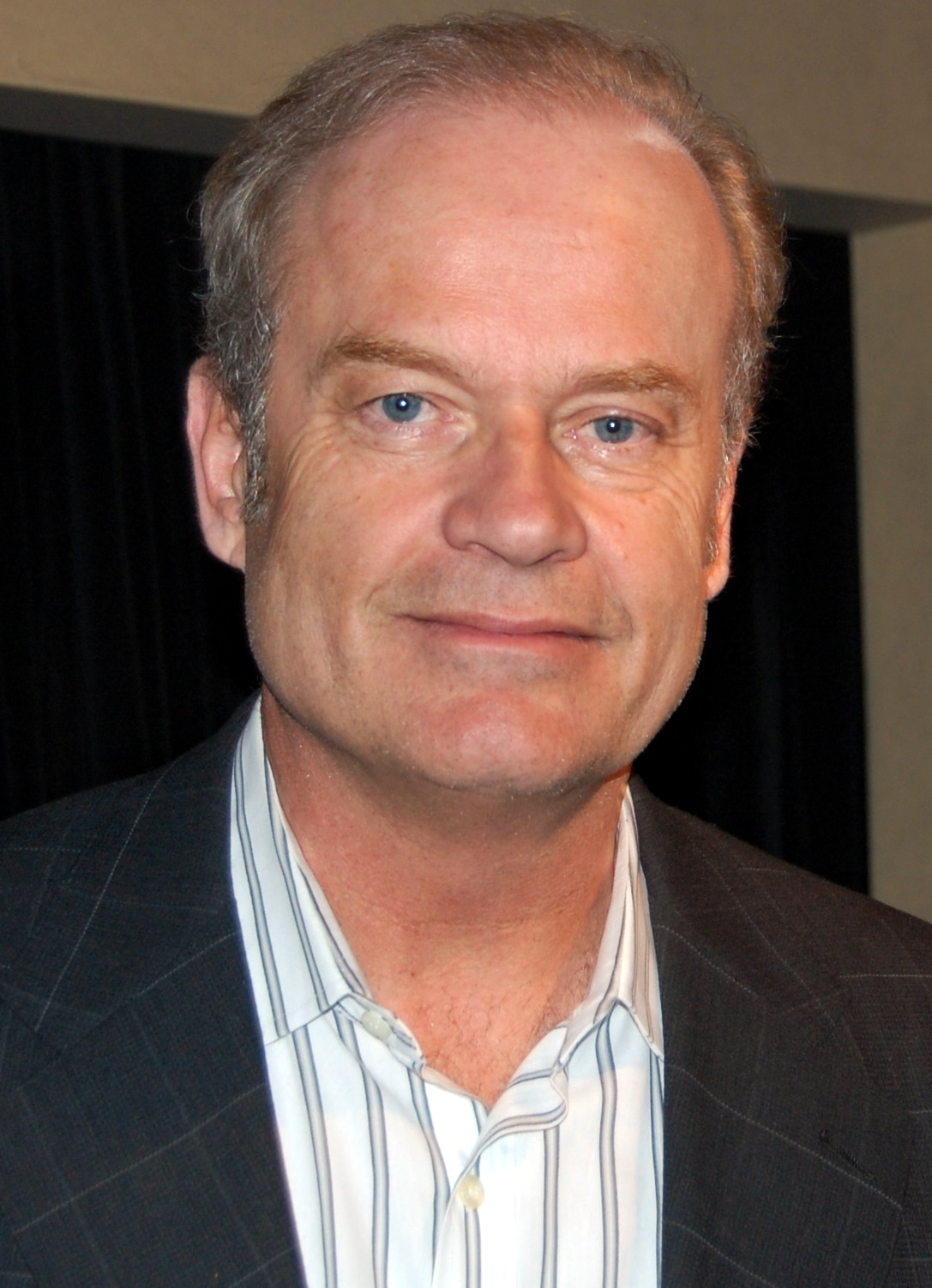
Kelsey Grammer debuted this season as upper-class psychiatrist Frasier Crane, beau of Diane Chambers and rival of bartender Sam Malone.

After Sam and Diane's breakup the previous season, psychiatrist Frasier Crane was introduced this season by series creators Glen and Les Charles as Diane's upper-class "romantic and intellectual ideal". Frasier was the opposite of his lower-class rival, Sam Malone; as part of a love triangle he gave "a different form to the Sam-Diane relationship", said Glen Charles. It was originally planned for Frasier to appear only in the first few episodes before being dumped by Diane, when he would disappear. John Lithgow was originally chosen by Cheers' producers for the role, but he turned it down. Kelsey Grammer (who believed he had flunked his audition) was chosen for his performance with Danson, which elicited praise from show executives and led to an extended role in the series for his character. Before Cheers, Grammer appeared in the soap opera Another World and two miniseries: Kennedy and George Washington.

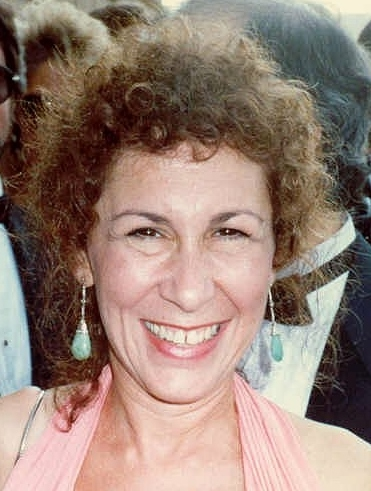
Actress Rhea Perlman (and her character, Carla Tortelli) became pregnant again this season.

In late August 1984, the pregnancies of actresses Rhea Perlman and Shelley Long were announced after at least four episodes of the season were completed. Perlman's second pregnancy was incorporated into the show by having her character, Carla Tortelli, become pregnant again (with another man, not her ex-husband Nick as in the series' first season). Long's character's (Diane Chambers') unmarried pregnancy was considered, with the father of her child either Sam or Frasier. However, the producers felt that incorporating Long's pregnancy into the show would adversely impact her character and the romantic storyline. Therefore, Long's pregnancy was concealed by either putting her behind the bar or filming her above the waist; scenes with Diane and Frasier in Europe were filmed before Long's pregnancy became noticeable. In March 1985, both actresses gave birth to baby girls.

Nicholas Colasanto, who played Coach Ernie Pantusso, had heart disease since the mid-1970s exacerbated by alcoholism. After years of sobriety, during production his heart disease worsened. Castmates noticed his weight loss, although the actor kept the severity of his illness a secret. Shortly after Christmas 1984, Colasanto was admitted to a local hospital with water in his lungs. Co-star Ted Danson later said that the veteran actor had difficulty remembering his lines during production that season. After he was released from the hospital, Colasanto's doctor recommended that he not return to work. Although he appeared in the cold opening of the third-season finale ("Rescue Me"), his last full episode was "Cheerio Cheers" (filmed in late November 1984). Colasanto died of a heart attack at his home on February 12, 1985, at age 61. Instead of recasting him, Colasanto's character Coach was written out of the show the following season as deceased without explanation.

== Ratings ==
Cheers was scheduled on Thursdays at 9 pm Eastern (8 pm Central) against CBS's crime series Simon & Simon and ABC programming, which included the short-lived series Glitter, made-for-television and hit theatrical films such as Grease. As reported on April 25, 1985, Cheers was No. 12 (with an average 19.7 Nielsen rating) for the season, tied with ABC's Hotel.

== Reception ==
...The best thing to happen in [this season], of course, is the addition of one Dr. Frasier Crane, MD, to the cast. Soon everybody knew his name, and nobody would be able to forget it for twenty-odd years (Frasier [recently went] off the airwaves at NBC). But back in 1984, Frasier was cocky, bright-eyed, incredibly youthful, and had a lot more hair on his gigantic forehead. His awkward integration into the tight-knit group of friends was the subject of many an episode this season, as he stuck out like a gigantic tool. By the end of the season, though, he ceased to be the nerdy kid nobody liked, and fit in with the gang like a glove.

— Adam Arseneau, DVD Verdict, July 12, 2004

Despite praise for Kelsey Grammer from show executives, at the time of Cheers' original run Frasier Crane was disliked for coming between Sam and Diane. A fan approached Grammer, asking "Are you that pin dick that plays Frasier?" and the show received fan mail opposing him. Mike Boone of the Montreal Gazette was unhappy with "a shrink [as becoming another regular] hanging out in a bar, annoying decent drinking folk". Gail Shister of Knight-Ridder Newspapers called Frasier a "creepy boyfriend".

In a 1985 survey of 36 critics for United States newspapers, Cheers was ranked the second "Best Regular Series" (tying with the NBC crime series Hill Street Blues). Mike Duffy of Knight News Service called it the "best comedy series on television...about [a] family of circumstance" since The Mary Tyler Moore Show and Taxi, and the characters "a family whose common bond is hanging out at a bar where everybody knows your name".

Later reviews were also positive, especially when its DVD was released in 2004. Nate Meyers of digitallyObsessed!com gave the season an "A" and called it well-aged and "nearly flawless". However, Meyers found Coach's disappearances in the final eight "somewhat awkward" episodes poorly handled. He pointed out that Coach was not mentioned in several episodes, and found the explanations of his disappearances not "natural" for the episodes in which he was mentioned but not seen. Nevertheless, Meyers praised the season's writing, James Burrows's directing (especially for "[fooling] the audience into believing a dream sequence" in season finale "Rescue Me"), the season's humor as "character and situation driven" (although "[a] few jokes are dated") and its ability to focus less on humor and more on "genuine character moments" as "refreshing" compared to other situation comedies of the time.

Adam Arseneau of DVD Verdict gave the storylines (including those featuring Norm and Cliff) 89 percent and the acting 94 percent. However, Arseneau found this season neither the best nor the worst of the series. Although Frasier was created to come between Sam and Diane, Arseneau praised the addition of the new character but criticized the love-triangle storyline as "disappointing". Like Meyers, Arseneau disliked the handling of Coach's "absence" for dishonoring the memory of Nicholas Colasanto and "[robbing] fans [of] their opportunity to properly and respectfully mourn his passing."

Jeffrey Robinson of DVD Talk rated this season four out of five stars and found its DVD release highly rewatchable. Robinson said that the plots were uncomplicated, praised the acting and writing of this season as "superb" and liked the introduction of Frasier Crane. Because of Colasanto's death, he called this season the final one for the original "wonderful" ensemble cast, finding the mixing of different characters in later seasons less accomplished.

Cliff Wheatley of IGN called one of the episodes "The Heart Is a Lonely Snipe Hunter" the tenth best Cheers episode, despite not being "the funniest episode by a long shot" but "a little mean spirited."

== Accolades ==
The series won three honors in April 1985 from Viewers for Quality Television, which began that year. Shelley Long was the Best Lead Actress (Comedy), Rhea Perlman the Best Supporting Actress (Comedy) and Nicholas Colasanto posthumously received the Best Supporting Actor (Comedy) award. Of twelve Emmy nominations, in 1985 Perlman won for Outstanding Supporting Actress in a Comedy Series and "The Executive's Executioner" earned its sound crew the "Outstanding Live and Tape Sound Mixing and Sound Effects for a Series" award. Of nominees for 1984, Shelley Long won a Golden Globe in 1985 as Best Actress in a Musical-Comedy Series.

== DVD release ==
This season was released on DVD in Region 1 on May 25, 2004. Nate Meyers of Digitally Obsessed graded the video transfer a B+ (despite "print defects" in some episodes) and found the audio "proper", noting that the special features were (like other season DVDs) compilation clips of episodes, including a tribute to Nicholas Colasanto.

Cheers: The Complete Third Season
Set Details		Special Features
25 episodes; 4-disc set; 1:33:1 aspect ratio; English - Stereo; Closed captioning (Region 1); Subtitles: Danish, English, French, Italian, Swedish, Spanish, Norwegian (Region 2)		Virtual Vera; Carla's Whipping Boy; Shrink-Warped: Introducing Frasier Crane; Cheers Bar Tour; Nicholas Colasanto: His Final Season
Release dates
Region 1	Region 2	Region 4
May 25, 2004	6 September 2004	10 September 2004
