= Cheers season 4 =

Cheers
- Season 4
- Region 1 DVD
- Showrunners: David Angell; Peter Casey; David Lee
- Starring: Ted Danson; Shelley Long; Rhea Perlman; John Ratzenberger; Woody Harrelson; George Wendt
- No. of episodes: 26

Release
- Original network: NBC
- Original release: September 26, 1985 – May 15, 1986

Season chronology
- ← Previous; Season 3 Next → Season 5

The fourth season of the American television sitcom Cheers aired on NBC from September 26, 1985 to May 15, 1986. This season marks Woody Harrelson's television debut as Woody Boyd after Nicholas Colasanto, who portrayed Coach Ernie Pantusso, died during the previous season. The show was created by director James Burrows and writers Glen and Les Charles, under production team Charles Burrows Charles Productions, in association with Paramount Television.

== Background ==
During the previous season, 1984–85, after two years of struggling with low ratings, rapid schedule changes, and failed series, NBC's Thursday night lineup (years before the Must See TV promotional slogan was developed) consisted of, in time slot order starting at 8:00 p.m. Eastern / 7:00 p.m. Central: The Cosby Show, Family Ties, Cheers, Night Court, and Hill Street Blues, and became a ratings success for the network. The 1985–86 Thursday schedule was similar to the previous season's and was still a success.

== Cast and characters ==
- Ted Danson as Sam Malone — bartender, owner, retired Red Sox relief pitcher
- Shelley Long as Diane Chambers — snobby waitress, the moral compass of the bar staff and patrons
- Rhea Perlman as Carla Tortelli — bitter waitress, divorced mother of six. Gives birth to Ludlow, named after his father Dr. Bennett Ludlow, Frasier's mentor.
- John Ratzenberger as Cliff Clavin — postal carrier and virginal, loquacious bar know-it-all
- Woody Harrelson as Woody Boyd — dim small town Indiana bar-tender, hired by Sam to fill-in for the coach's absence following the latter's death.
- George Wendt as Norm Peterson — a semi-unemployed accountant, a childless husband
- Kelsey Grammer as Frasier Crane (recurring) — jilted psychiatrist
  Recurring and credited in the end credits, though appears in most episodes. In remastered prints of the episode "Cliffie's Big Score", seen on DVD and later syndication, Grammer's name appears in the opening credits, although he does not appear in the episode and is not officially credited in the opening until Season 5.

During the previous season, Sam went to Italy to stop Frasier and Diane's wedding. This season, he fails to do so, and returns to Boston. Several months later, Frasier comes to the bar to announce that Diane jilted him at the altar, had sex with other men, and is now in a convent, located one hour away from Boston. Sam retrieves Diane from the convent and rehires her as a bar waitress. After having lost everything, including his career, Frasier frequently visits the Boston bar, Cheers, for drinks and then slowly degenerates into alcoholism. He recovers, then begins another psychiatric job, distancing himself from Sam and Diane's relationship. Sam then begins a relationship with the city councillor Janet Eldrige (Kate Mulgrew). Tired of being part the triangle with Sam and Diane, Janet breaks up with Sam. In the season's finale, during a telephone call, Sam proposes to an unidentified woman.

== Episodes ==
No. overall	No. in season	Title	Directed by	Written by	Original release date	Rating/share/rank (households)
70	1	"Birth, Death, Love and Rice"	James Burrows	Heide Perlman	September 26, 1985	26.0 / 39 / #4
Sam, returning from Italy, explains that he was arrested for trespassing at the previous location of Frasier and Diane's wedding and then purchased by a local landowner to work on his farm. Months later, Carla has already given birth, (Note: Ludlow's name and sex are not revealed until "I Kid You Not" (season 7, episode 14)) while Norm and Vera have decided never to have children. Woody Boyd, a naïve young man from a small, provincial Indiana town, visits Cheers only to discover that his pen-pal Coach Ernie Pantusso has died; Sam offers him a chance to tend bar at Cheers. Frasier, entering the office, tells Sam that Diane jilted him at the altar, resulting in the loss of his dignity, teaching tenure, and Italian practice. After unsuccessfully scaring Sam with an unloaded revolver, Frasier informs that, according to sources, Diane is now serving a self-inflicted penance at a convent outside of Boston after a spree of decadence in Italy. Against Frasier's wishes, Sam goes to the convent and offers Diane the old job back, but she refuses. Before he leaves, Sam tells Diane that he flew to Italy to stop the wedding and that he had hoped that they would be a couple again. Diane, moved by his words, decides to return to Cheers.
71	2	"Woody Goes Belly Up"	James Burrows	Heide Perlman	October 3, 1985	23.4 / 35 / #5
The bar gang learns about Woody's old small-town girlfriend Beth (Amanda Wyss) from Indiana, so Diane brings her to big city Boston. Suddenly, Woody and Beth begin to overeat, and the gang tries—but fails—to stop them. Frasier, now working as the bar janitor just to humiliate Diane, tells Woody that he and Beth substitute overeating for premarital sex. Rather than take Frasier's psychoanalysis seriously, Diane takes the couple out to a French restaurant for vegetarian dinner in order to help them control their eating habits. However, Woody and Beth end up taking Frasier's psychological advice seriously, and make plans for sex.
72	3	"Someday My Prince Will Come"	James Burrows	Tom Seeley & Norm Gunzenhauser	October 17, 1985	23.5 / 36 / #4
Diane dates Stuart Sorenson (Frank Dent), who is cultured and everything that Diane wants, after returning a lost expensive coat to him. However, he is not attractive, and she is relieved when the relationship ends when he reconciles with his old girlfriend. Carla's son cannot complete his science project, so Carla reluctantly asks Cliff to help him. Cheers was preempted by the second game of the 1985 National League Championship Series on October 10, 1985.
73	4	"The Groom Wore Clearasil"	James Burrows	Peter Casey & David Lee	October 24, 1985	20.9 / 30 / #13
Carla repeatedly fails to dissuade her teenage son Anthony (Timothy Williams) from marrying his girlfriend Annie (Amanda Ingber). Sam tries to expose Anthony the joys of bachelorhood, but Sam's own one-night stands and lack of commitments result in failure. Much to Carla's relief and Annie's displeasure, Anthony becomes attracted to Annie's cousin Gabrielle (Sherilyn Fenn). During an interview for a position as a teaching assistant, Diane inadvertently accuses Professor Moffat (John Ingle) of making a pass. Although she soon realizes her mistake, she is unable to make up for her misunderstanding.
74	5	"Diane's Nightmare"	James Burrows	David Lloyd	October 31, 1985	24.1 / 36 / #6
Diane has a series of dreams. In the first, everyone goes to the wine cellar, but no one comes out during a blackout. In the next, an ex-con Andy Schroeder (Derek McGrath)—healed in psychological sessions by Frasier Crane, who then becomes a kleptomaniac—marries a woman to move on from Diane, and Sam becomes Diane's upper-class ideal, complete with urbane speeches and a tobacco pipe. When she wakes up to reality, Diane finds Sam to be normal, every-day Sam and discovers that the "pipe" he uses blows soap bubbles.
75	6	"I Will Gladly Pay You Tuesday"	James Burrows	Cheri Eichen & Bill Steinkellner	November 7, 1985	21.1 / 30 / #14
Diane buys a rare autographed first edition of the Ernest Hemingway novel The Sun Also Rises for $500, which was loaned to her by Sam. Diane plans to sell it and asks Sam to keep it in his safe. Sam starts reading the novel, and then ruins it by accidentally dropping it into a filled bathtub. When Diane shows up with a book collector who wishes to buy the novel, Sam claims he's fallen in love with the book and outbids him, impressing Diane. While they passionately embrace, Diane asks for Sam's share of the money, infuriating him. Cliff walks backwards in order to break a world record, but he stops when he backs into his mother's curling iron.
76	7	"2 Good to Be 4 Real"	James Burrows	Peter Casey and David Lee	November 14, 1985	24.7 / 37 / #4
Carla's personal ad in the classifieds has remained unanswered. In order to lift her spirits, the men write fake love letters, posing as "Mitch Wainwright, an international airline pilot". They send a photo of an anonymous model (which came with Norm's wallet). Fortunately, Carla assumes that "Mitch" is also a model when a customer recognizes him. When she turns down a real person, funeral director Vinnie Claussen (Michael Alaimo), Sam confesses the truth to Carla, that "Mitch" is a character created by the men, angering her. After a heart-to-heart talk with Diane, Carla forgives the men and then reluctantly dates Vinnie.
77	8	"Love Thy Neighbor"	James Burrows	David Angell	November 21, 1985	21.9 / 33 / #11
Norm and his next-door neighbor Phyllis Henshaw (Miriam Flynn) fear that his wife Vera and Phyllis' husband Ron may be having an affair. They hire a private investigator to spy on their spouses. Later, Norm and Phyllis are close to making love in the billiard room, but they are interrupted when Santo arrives. Much to their mutual relief, Santo's compact cassette reveals that Vera and Ron never had an affair and are still faithful to their respective spouses, ending their partnership with each other. During an interview with his friend, sportscaster Dave Richards (Fred Dryer), Sam tells an embarrassing story about Diane and is later forced to apologize on air. On the East Coast, due to Ronald Reagan's presidential address at 9:00 p.m. (ET)/8:00 p.m. (CT), this episode aired at either 9:30 p.m. or 9:40 p.m. ET, preempting Night Court. Nevertheless, on the West Coast, it aired at 9:00 p.m. (Pacific)/8:00 p.m. (Mountain), as regularly scheduled, followed by Night Court. Ernie Sabella appears on a previous episode, "Whodunit?", as Stan.
78	9	"From Beer to Eternity"	James Burrows	Peter Casey & David Lee	November 28, 1985	21.6 / 36 / #10
The Cheers gang decides to compete against the gang of a rival bar, Gary's Old Towne Tavern, in bowling after suffering losing streaks against them in other sports. Woody, who was a trophy-winning bowler back in Indiana, refuses to bowl again because he once injured a man in a freak bowling accident. When the Cheers team is losing, Gary (Joel Polis) wagers that, if the Cheers team wins, Diane would go out with him. Offended, Diane joins the team and proves to be a ringer, beating Gary's team. Joel Polis and Robert Desiderio alternately reprise the same role of Gary in later seasons. This episode introduces the long-running rivalry between Cheers and Gary's Old Towne Tavern; future episodes featuring this rivalry all included the words "Bar Wars" in their titles, and ran from seasons 6 through 11.
79	10	"The Barstoolie"	James Burrows	Andy Cowan & David S. Williger	December 5, 1985	24.4 / 36 / #5
Cliff meets his long-lost estranged father, Cliff Sr. (Dick O'Neill), and enjoys the reunion. His father later confesses that he is a runaway felon for fraud and disappears after going to the bathroom. Sam's upper-class date Claudia (Claudia Cron) befriends Diane and invites her to join them for dinner. After supper, Sam orders a cheesecake for himself and Claudia at Melville's, but then she dumps him for being too sexually aggressive and less classy. Afterwards, Sam invites Diane instead, who reluctantly accepts.
80	11	"Don Juan Is Hell"	James Burrows	Phoef Sutton	December 12, 1985	24.0 / 36 / #6
Happy to be the subject of Diane's psychological term paper, Sam invites Diane's class to the bar for the presentation. Worried, she orders Sam to read the paper in the hopes that he will change his mind. Sam, however, only reads the cover page before deeming it boring. The next day, Sam humiliates the class with his self-praise over his sexual history. Diane takes him to the office and reads the paper to him, which describes him as promiscuous, an aging sexist whose life is "cheap and pathetic", and unable to commit to a relationship, putting him at risk of loneliness. Sam attempts to prove that he can have a non-sexual relationship with a woman, which backfires when both he and Diane become aroused. Woody attempts to beat Carla at sports trivia. Cliff sends to The Chronicle a photo of a squash that he compares to a map of Hawaii.
81	12	"Fools and Their Money"	James Burrows	Heide Perlman	December 19, 1985	23.1 / 35 / #4
Sam prevents Woody from making a $1,000 sports bet by pretending to place the bet on Woody's behalf. Sam's intentions backfire when the teams win, and Woody is out $10,000. Sam admits this situation to Woody, and Woody initially forgives him until Sam refuses to give Woody his Corvette as compensation. To settle differences between them, Sam sings "Home on the Range", which Coach used to sing with Sam whenever things went wrong between them. Much to Diane's annoyance, Frasier tries to correct her grammar all day.
82	13	"Take My Shirt... Please"	James Burrows	David Lloyd	January 9, 1986	24.3 / 36 / #7
Sam sends his old baseball jersey to a public television auction, where Diane is working as a telephone receptionist for one day. When it comes up for auction, Diane buys the jersey for $100 to prevent it from being unsold and then randomly given to someone whose name is drawn out of the coconut by the chimpanzee, Mr. Bobo. Sam refuses her gesture and wants it auctioned again. However, crushed that no one buys it, Sam poses as a female phone customer and tries to buy it for $200 until Diane catches him right away, prompting him to quickly cancel. Another customer, Bert Simpson (Patrick Cronin), purchases it for $300 in order to prevent it from appearing again during the auction, and returns it to Sam. In order to get a job, Norm tries unsuccessfully to impress his clients, Mr. Brubaker (Robert Symonds) and his wife (Frances Bay), by taking them to the bar and Melville's. They turn out to be major bores, and only Cliff, whom Norm warned to stay away, is able to charm them.
83	14	"Suspicion"	James Burrows	Tom Reeder	January 16, 1986	25.4 / 36 / #5
Diane studies paranoid behavior among bar mates by hiring Irving (M. C. Gainey) to pose as a suspicious man. Afterwards, Diane becomes worried that the gang will pull pranks on her for her charade. When a journalist comes to the bar asking Diane to read some of her poetry on the air, she assumes it's a setup and clucks like a chicken during the segment. To her humiliation, the show was genuine and the clip airs. Diane admits she still feels like an outsider because the Cheers gang didn't bother to get back at her like they would anyone else. She then immediately walks into a booby trap which douses her with water and proves the gang does like her enough to get revenge.
84	15	"The Triangle"	James Burrows	Susan Seeger	January 23, 1986	24.0 / 35 / #7
Frasier deteriorates into alcoholism and has no interest in practicing psychiatry any more. Feeling bad about Frasier, Diane concocts a plan where Sam feigns psychiatric symptoms in order to boost Frasier's self-confidence. Frasier concludes that Sam is still in love with Diane and advises him to confess it to her. Sam and Diane try to write phony love letters in the office, but they end up arguing. Frasier walks in to intervene, but then Sam admits that the whole situation is a charade. Despite feeling cheated, Frasier angrily tells them that they are still in love but denying it, declares himself to be no longer part of their relationship, and decides to practice psychiatry again. Cliff invites Norm to his party and promises that his postal workers would arrive, but only Norm arrives to the party that is lacking food and beer.
85	16	"Cliffie's Big Score"	James Burrows	Heide Perlman	January 30, 1986	23.8 / 34 / #6
Cliff asks Diane to be his dancing partner for a ball, but she turns him down. Then he promises to give Carla money, a dress, and a VCR if she would go as his date, which Carla reluctantly accepts. Diane then has second thoughts about Cliff's offer and accepts it. Rather than turn down Diane, Cliff gives Carla another dancing partner. After the dance, Cliff inadvertently tells her that he was torn between her and Diane. In retaliation, Carla tells him that Diane has the hots for him. Cliff tries to seduce Diane, but Diane kicks him out of the car and leaves him stranded.
86	17	"Second Time Around"	Thomas Lofaro	Cheri Eichen & Bill Steinkellner	February 6, 1986	24.7 / 35 / #5
After Frasier's unsuccessful date with a psychiatrist, Dr. Lilith Sternin (Bebe Neuwirth), Sam sets him up on a date with ditzy Candi Pearson (Jennifer Tilly), one of Sam's women. After a one-night stand, Frasier and Candi get engaged. When Diane tries to help Frasier come to his senses, Frasier berates Diane and then insults Candi. Realizing what he did, Frasier apologizes to Candi. Frasier and Candi decide to halt the wedding in order to develop their relationship. Cliff brings in his mother's eccentric-shaped pretzels. Unfortunately, no one likes them, but they cannot tell him because they do not want to hurt his mother's feelings. This episode is Bebe Neuwirth's only season appearance, and first series appearance, as Lilith Sternin. Neuwirth reprises her role as Lilith in later seasons before joining the spinoff Frasier. Jennifer Tilly later appears as Kim, Frasier's casual fling in Frasier episode, "Miss Right Now" (2004).
87	18	"The Peterson Principle"	James Burrows	Peter Casey & David Lee	February 13, 1986	23.9 / 35 / #5
Norm finds out from his coworker (Chip Zien) that his main competitor Morrison is having an affair with his boss Mr. Reinhardt's (Daniel Davis) wife. When Morrison gets a promotion, rather than reveal the affair, Norm decides to conceal it for his own dignity. Then Mr. Reinhardt admits to Norm that Norm's wife Vera did not get along with the other coworkers' wives, thereby costing Norm his promotion. Frasier mocks Diane in front of everyone for tearing his heart apart during a slide presentation of their European trip. In order to help Frasier get over his feelings for Diane, Sam brings him along to find ladies. Because of Family Ties's special one-hour broadcast, this episode aired at 9:30 p.m. instead of 9:00 p.m., its regular time, preempting Night Court.
88	19	"Dark Imaginings"	James Burrows	David Angell	February 20, 1986	23.4 / 34 / #6
While Sam and Woody compete with each other at racquetball for a young woman, Sam develops a hernia. Soon, he is unable to bear the pain any longer while hiding it from the others. He secretly goes to the hospital under the assumed name of "Lance Manion" until the others find out. At the bar, after Sam returns from the hospital, Woody slaps Sam's butt, causing Sam to suffer a relapse and prompting him to return to the hospital. After Sam's friends visit him, Sam meets his counterpart Jack Turner (Thomas Callaway), whose attractive 'date' turns out to be his grown daughter. In the final scene, Sam views the rainy night through the window, symbolically reflecting his life without marriage and children. Frasier professionally consults Cliff about his unusual comparisons of homegrown vegetables to famous people. However, Cliff confronts Frasier for billing him hundreds of dollars for such sessions.
89	20	"Save the Last Dance for Me"	James Burrows	Heide Perlman	February 27, 1986	26.0 / 38 / #3
Carla turns down Nick's (Dan Hedaya) request for her to be his dancing partner for a dancing reunion contest, so Nick picks his wife Loretta (Jean Kasem), and Carla picks Eddie (Nick Dimitri). When Eddie injures himself after tripping on the bar stairs, Sam replaces him as Carla's partner. Sam and Carla are eliminated in the first round, as are Nick and Loretta. The judges grant Nick's request to dance with Carla, and the two win a trophy. At the bar after the dance contest, Nick begs Carla to help him rebuild their relationship, but she refuses to have an affair with a married man.
90	21	"Fear Is My Co-Pilot"	James Burrows	Cheri Eichen & Bill Steinkellner	March 13, 1986	23.5 / 35 / #3
Diane is reunited with Jack Dalton (Joseph Whipp), an enthusiast of danger, whom she met in Europe after she dumped Frasier. Diane reluctantly goes out with Jack on a private jet and brings Sam along for protection. In the jet at 20,000 feet, Jack is found apparently dead. Sam and Diane try to fly the plane, fearing for their lives. However, Jack turns out to be alive and practicing a Tibetan meditation, causing him to appear dead without a heartbeat or a pulse. When Jack safely lands the plane, Sam and Diane report the incident to the FAA.
91	22	"Diane Chambers Day"	James Burrows	Kimberly Hill	March 20, 1986	26.2 / 39 / #3
After watching the western film The Magnificent Seven without her, the gang feels guilty for leaving Diane out of their activities and making her feel depressed. In an attempt to make her feel better, Frasier arranges for his male buddies, against their will, to watch the opera Lucia di Lammermoor with Diane. During the performance, everyone falls asleep, including Diane. After the opera is over, Sam and Diane return to the bar. While they are close to making passionate love, Sam admits to her that Frasier came up with the opera idea. Diane appreciates Sam's honesty and, much to Sam's displeasure, decides to postpone sex until the time is right.
92	23	"Relief Bartender"	James Burrows	Miriam Trogdon	March 27, 1986	22.3 / 35 / #6
In order to compete with two new bars, Sam promotes himself to manager and host. To increase his chances of success, he hires another bartender, Ken (Tony Carreiro), and arranges a seafood feast. The plan fails when only three people show up, so Sam decides to fire one of bartenders in order to save the bar. He is unable to fire Ken because he has a wife (Patricia Veselich) and two kids (Edan Gross and Judith Barsi), so instead he fires Woody. When Ken is hired by another company, Sam rehires Woody with a $30 per week raise.
93	24	"Strange Bedfellows"	James Burrows	David Angell	May 1, 1986	23.9 / 37 / #3
94	25	"Strange Bedfellows"	James Burrows	David Angell	May 8, 1986	22.6 / 35 / #5
95	26	"Strange Bedfellows"	James Burrows	David Angell	May 15, 1986	24.4 / 37 / #4
Part 1: Sam dates the local councilwoman Janet Eldridge (Kate Mulgrew), who is campaigning for her re-election. Diane accuses Janet of exploiting Sam as part of her campaign. Janet admits it, but tells her that she has feelings for him, which Diane doubts. Janet wins the election, and Sam and Janet resume their relationship, much to Diane's dismay. Part 2: While jealous Frasier tells others that Diane had a sex change operation, Sam and Janet grow closer. One night at closing time, Janet admits to Sam her jealousy toward Diane, and orders him to fire Diane. Diane overhears their conversation and resigns before Sam has the chance to fire her. Norm fears that Vera's sister Donna may attempt to seduce him. Part 3: At Janet's press conference, Diane, who works as a temporary checkout clerk, asks Janet questions about Janet's relationship with Sam. Reporters follow through, and then Diane squirts liquid from a squirt gun at Sam. He escorts her out and she grabs and holds his tie so it catches in the closed front door. After the conference, Janet breaks up with Sam because she believes that Sam is still in love with Diane and has cared less about Janet and her political career. At closing time, Sam dials a phone number and proposes to an unidentified person on the other end of the line. Norm is left alone with Vera's sister Donna when Vera has been called away to care for her ill aunt. At dinner, Donna turns out to be sweet and innocent, leading to no sex or romance between her and Norm.

== Production ==
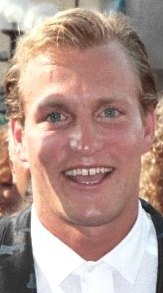
Woody Harrelson debuts as Woody Boyd this season.

During filming of the series' third season, Nicholas Colasanto, who portrayed regular character Coach Ernie Pantusso, died of a heart attack. Rather than recast the character, Coach was written out. In the season's premiere episode, "Birth, Death, Love and Rice", it was revealed that the character of Coach had died, although no explanation was given. As a replacement for Coach, the show's producers created a new character, Woody Boyd, "an Indiana farm boy" who becomes a bartender in the bar of big city Boston, portrayed by Woody Harrelson. Before Cheers, Harrelson was an understudy in a Broadway play, Biloxi Blues, and made his film debut in Wildcats, which was released to theaters in February 1986.

== Reception ==
In the 1985–86 season, Cheers was scheduled at 9:00 p.m. (Eastern) / 8:00 p.m. (Central) against CBS's Simon & Simon and ABC's The Colbys, which replaced Lady Blue, which moved to Saturdays in mid-November 1985. On December 26, 1985, the series gained 33 percent in the Nielsen ratings from the previous season. As of January 29, 1986, it became one of top three rated series among females, along with the other two Must See TV sitcoms, The Cosby Show and Family Ties. As of April 23, 1986, it scored an overall 23.7 rating and a 35 share, putting it into fifth place in the 1985–86 season.

Despite disdaining the Sam-and-Diane romance, and considering this series a typical sitcom in earlier seasons, television critic Rick Sherwood praised the fourth season as the "funniest [and] most intelligent" since the debut season.

The fourth season ended with the cliffhanger of Sam Malone calling and proposing to an unknown individual. A telephone survey polled callers regarding who they thought that recipient was: politician Janet Eldridge or Sam's on again/off again girlfriend Diane Chambers. Nearly 140 picked Diane, and almost 60 picked Janet. Those who voted for Janet were not fans of Janet; rather, they expected the love triangle to continue in the next season. A few of the callers polled considered Janet as "funny and appealing". The rest thought Janet was wrong for Sam.

Jeffrey Robinson of DVD Talk perceived this season as neither as great nor as strongly rewatchable nor as hilarious as earlier seasons, but worth watching, especially for fans. Robinson found its shows "episodic". Adam Arseneau of DVD Verdict described it as "impeccable and golden", with 95 percent on the story and 94 on acting. The critics deemed the introduction of a new character, Woody Boyd (even if not well-developed and well-integrated), the growing prominence of Frasier Crane, and the supposedly one-time character Lilith Sternin, who becomes a recurring character in later seasons, as highlights of the fourth season. However, they found the unexplained death of Coach Ernie Pantusso to be one of the season's low points.

Nate Meyers of Digitally Obsessed praised this fourth season as well-aged and still "fresh", especially after mostly omitting "topical humor" and developing characters. Robert David Sullivan ranked "I'll Gladly Pay You Tuesday" (1985) at number 36 in his list of top 100 favorite sitcom episodes.

== Accolades ==
All cast members, except newcomer Woody Harrelson and actor Kelsey Grammer (whose character Frasier Crane appears recurringly this season), were nominated for Primetime Emmy Awards in 1986. Only Rhea Perlman won her own Emmy Award, as an Outstanding Supporting Actress in a Comedy Series. The episode "Fear Is My Co-Pilot" earned the following crew an award for Outstanding Sound Mixing for a Comedy Series or Special: Michael Ballin, Robert Douglass, Douglas Grey, and Thomas J. Huth.

Shelley Long was awarded the Best Lead Actress in a Comedy Series by Viewers for Quality Television in 1986 for her performance throughout the whole season. Long also won a Golden Globe in 1985 as the Best Actress in a Musical/Comedy Series for her performance in 1985.

== DVD release ==
The fourth season is available on DVD, with four discs in the set. On February 1, 2005, the entire season was released to Region 1 DVD with four discs in the set. Unlike DVD releases of earlier seasons, the season four set lacks special features, such as interviews and outtakes.

Cheers: The Complete Fourth Season
Set Details
26 episodes; 4-disc set; 1:33:1 aspect ratio; English – Stereo; Closed captioning (Region 1); Subtitles: Danish, English, French, Italian, Swedish, Spanish, Norwegian (Region 2)
Release dates
Region 1	Region 2	Region 4
February 1, 2005	July 18, 2005	July 21, 2005
