= 35th Primetime Emmy Awards =

1983 American television programming awards

- Date: September 25, 1983 (Ceremony); September 18, 1983 (Creative Arts Awards)
- Location: Pasadena Civic Auditorium, Pasadena, California
- Presented by: Academy of Television Arts and Sciences
- Hosted by: Eddie Murphy; Joan Rivers

Highlights
- Most awards: Cheers (4)
- Most nominations: Hill Street Blues (14)
- Outstanding Comedy Series: Cheers
- Outstanding Drama Series: Hill Street Blues
- Outstanding Limited Series: The Life and Adventures of Nicholas Nickleby
- Outstanding Variety, Music or Comedy Program: Motown 25: Yesterday, Today, Forever

Television/radio coverage
- Network: NBC

The 35th Primetime Emmy Awards were held on September 25, 1983. The ceremony was broadcast on NBC, from the Pasadena Civic Auditorium, Pasadena, California. It is remembered for the vulgar language during the ceremony, much of it from Joan Rivers who cohosted the ceremony with Eddie Murphy. Rivers also wore nine dresses throughout the ceremony. 26 awards were presented.

Despite being one of the lowest-rated shows of the season, the critically acclaimed first season of Cheers won Outstanding Comedy Series as well as three other major awards. For the third straight year, Hill Street Blues won Outstanding Drama Series, it received at least 14 major nominations for the third straight year, unprecedented at the time, and also received every nomination in the Outstanding Writing in a Drama Series field. Second City Television also garnered every nomination in a category, for Outstanding Writing in a Variety, Music or Comedy Program. NBC dominated the night, on the strength of the shows mentioned, it received 71 of the 128 major nominations, and won 19 of 25 major categories.

In its final ceremony, M*A*S*H was once again nominated for Outstanding Comedy Series. M*A*S*H was nominated every year it was on the air, 11/11, winning once in 1974, this record would be tied by Cheers a decade later when it too went 11/11, finishing with four victories.

== Winners and nominees ==
=== Programs ===
Programs
| Outstanding Comedy Series: Cheers (NBC); Buffalo Bill (NBC); M*A*S*H (CBS); Newhart (CBS); Taxi (NBC) | Outstanding Drama Series: Hill Street Blues (NBC); Cagney & Lacey (CBS); Fame (NBC); Magnum, P.I. (CBS); St. Elsewhere (NBC) |
| Outstanding Drama Special: Special Bulletin (NBC); Little Gloria... Happy at Last (NBC); M.A.D.D.: Mothers Against Drunk Drivers (NBC); The Scarlet Pimpernel (CBS); Who Will Love My Children? (ABC) | Outstanding Limited Series: The Life and Adventures of Nicholas Nickleby (Syndicated); Smiley's People (Syndicated); The Thorn Birds (ABC); To Serve Them All My Days (CBS); The Winds of War (ABC) |
Outstanding Variety, Music or Comedy Program: Motown 25: Yesterday, Today, Forever (NBC); The 37th Annual Tony Awards (CBS); The Kennedy Center Honors: A Celebration of the Performing Arts (CBS); Second City Television (NBC); The Tonight Show Starring Johnny Carson (NBC)

=== Acting ===
==== Lead performances ====
Acting
| Outstanding Lead Actor in a Comedy Series: Judd Hirsch as Alex Reiger in Taxi (NBC) (Episode: "Alex's Old Buddy"); Alan Alda as Hawkeye Pierce in M*A*S*H (CBS); Dabney Coleman as Bill Bittinger in Buffalo Bill (NBC); Ted Danson as Sam Malone in Cheers (NBC); Robert Guillaume as Benson DuBois in Benson (ABC) | Outstanding Lead Actress in a Comedy Series: Shelley Long as Diane Chambers in Cheers (NBC) (Episode: "Give Me a Ring Sometime"); Nell Carter as Nell Harper in Gimme a Break! (NBC); Mariette Hartley as Jennifer Barnes in Goodnight, Beantown (CBS); Swoosie Kurtz as Laurie Morgan in Love, Sidney (NBC); Rita Moreno as Violet Newstead in 9 to 5 (ABC); Isabel Sanford as Louise Jefferson in The Jeffersons (CBS) |
| Outstanding Lead Actor in a Drama Series: Ed Flanders as Dr. Donald Westphall in St. Elsewhere (NBC); William Daniels as Dr. Mark Craig in St. Elsewhere (NBC); John Forsythe as Blake Carrington in Dynasty (ABC); Tom Selleck as Thomas Magnum in Magnum, P.I. (CBS); Daniel J. Travanti as Capt. Frank Furillo in Hill Street Blues (NBC) | Outstanding Lead Actress in a Drama Series: Tyne Daly as Mary Beth Lacey in Cagney & Lacey (CBS) (Episode: "Burn Out"); Debbie Allen as Lydia Grant in Fame (NBC); Linda Evans as Krystle Carrington in Dynasty (ABC); Sharon Gless as Christine Cagney in Cagney & Lacey (CBS); Veronica Hamel as Joyce Davenport in Hill Street Blues (NBC) |
| Outstanding Lead Actor in a Limited Series or a Special: Tommy Lee Jones as Gary Mark Gilmore in The Executioner's Song (NBC); Robert Blake as Jimmy Hoffa in Blood Feud (Syndicated); Richard Chamberlain as Ralph de Bricassart in The Thorn Birds (ABC); Alec Guinness as George Smiley in Smiley's People (Syndicated); Roger Rees as Nicholas Nickleby in The Life and Adventures of Nicholas Nickleby (Syndicated) | Outstanding Lead Actress in a Limited Series or a Special: Barbara Stanwyck as Mary Carson in The Thorn Birds (ABC) (Episode: "Part 1"); Ann-Margret as Lucile Fray in Who Will Love My Children? (ABC); Rosanna Arquette as Nicole Baker in The Executioner's Song (NBC); Mariette Hartley as Candy Lightner in M.A.D.D.: Mothers Against Drunk Drivers (NBC); Angela Lansbury as Gertrude Vanderbilt Whitney in Little Gloria... Happy at Last (NBC) |

==== Supporting performances ====
| Outstanding Supporting Actor in a Comedy or Variety or Music Series: Christopher Lloyd as Jim Ignatowski in Taxi (NBC) (Episode: "Jim's Inheritance"); Nicholas Colasanto as Coach Ernie Pantusso in Cheers (NBC); Danny DeVito as Louie De Palma in Taxi (NBC); Harry Morgan as Sherman T. Potter in M*A*S*H (CBS); Eddie Murphy as Various Characters in Saturday Night Live (NBC) | Outstanding Supporting Actress in a Comedy or Variety or Music Series: Carol Kane as Simka Dahblitz-Gravas in Taxi (NBC) (Episode: "Scenkees From a Marriage"); Eileen Brennan as Doreen Lewis in Private Benjamin (CBS); Marla Gibbs as Florence Johnston in The Jeffersons (CBS); Rhea Perlman as Carla Tortelli in Cheers (NBC); Loretta Swit as Margaret Houlihan in M*A*S*H (CBS) |
| Outstanding Supporting Actor in a Drama Series: James Coco as Arnie in St. Elsewhere (NBC) (Episode: "Cora and Arnie"); Ed Begley Jr. as Dr. Victor Ehrlich in St. Elsewhere (NBC); Michael Conrad as Sgt. Phil Esterhaus in Hill Street Blues (NBC); Joe Spano as Det. Henry Goldblume in Hill Street Blues (NBC); Bruce Weitz as Det. Mick Belker in Hill Street Blues (NBC) | Outstanding Supporting Actress in a Drama Series: Doris Roberts as Cora in St. Elsewhere (NBC) (Episode: "Cora and Arnie"); Barbara Bosson as Fay Furillo in Hill Street Blues (NBC); Christina Pickles as Nurse Helen Rosenthal in St. Elsewhere (NBC); Madge Sinclair as Nurse Ernestine Shoop in Trapper John, M.D. (CBS); Betty Thomas as Sgt. Lucille Bates in Hill Street Blues (NBC) |
| Outstanding Supporting Actor in a Limited Series or a Special: Richard Kiley as Paddy Cleary in The Thorn Birds (ABC) (Episode: "Part I"); Ralph Bellamy as President Franklin D. Roosevelt in The Winds of War (ABC); Bryan Brown as Luke O'Neill in The Thorn Birds (ABC); Christopher Plummer as Archbishop Vittorio Contini-Verchese in The Thorn Birds (ABC); David Threlfall as Smike in The Life and Adventures of Nicholas Nickleby (Syndicated) | Outstanding Supporting Actress in a Limited Series or a Special: Jean Simmons as Fiona 'Fee' Cleary in The Thorn Birds (ABC); Judith Anderson as Nurse in Medea (PBS); Polly Bergen as Rhoda Henry in The Winds of War (ABC); Bette Davis as Alice Gwynne Vanderbilt in Little Gloria... Happy at Last (NBC); Piper Laurie as Anne Mueller in The Thorn Birds (ABC) (Episode: "Part III") |

==== Individual performances ====
Outstanding Individual Performance in a Variety or Music Program
- Leontyne Price – Live from Lincoln Center: "Leontyne Price, Zubin Mehta and the New York Philharmonic" (PBS)
  - Carol Burnett – Texaco Star Theater...Opening Night (NBC)
  - Michael Jackson – Motown 25: Yesterday, Today, Forever (NBC)
  - Luciano Pavarotti – Live from Lincoln Center: "Luciano Pavarotti and the New York Philharmonic" (PBS)
  - Richard Pryor – Motown 25: Yesterday, Today, Forever (NBC)

=== Directing ===
Directing
| Outstanding Directing in a Comedy Series: Cheers (NBC): "Showdown, Part II" – James Burrows; Buffalo Bill (NBC): "Pilot" – Tom Patchett; Buffalo Bill (NBC): "Woody Quits" – Jim Drake; The Love Boat (ABC): "The Dog Show" – Bob Sweeney; M*A*S*H (CBS): "Goodbye, Farewell and Amen" – Alan Alda; M*A*S*H (CBS): "The Joker Is Wild" – Burt Metcalfe | Outstanding Directing in a Drama Series: Hill Street Blues (NBC): "Life in the Minors" – Jeff Bleckner; Fame (NBC): "And the Winner Is" – Marc Daniels; Fame (NBC): "Feelings" – Robert Scheerer; The Mississippi (CBS): "Old Hatreds Die Hard" – Leo Penn |
| Outstanding Directing in a Variety or Music Program: Sheena Easton... Act One (NBC) – Dwight Hemion; The 55th Annual Academy Awards (ABC) – Marty Pasetta; Live from Lincoln Center: "Stravinsky and Balanchine: A Genius Has a Birthday!" (PBS) – Emile Ardolino; Live from Lincoln Center: "Zubin Mehta Conducts Beethoven's Ninth with the New York Philharmonic" (PBS) – Kirk Browning; Motown 25: Yesterday, Today, Forever (NBC) – Don Mischer; Second City Television (NBC): "Sweeps Week" – John Blanchard and John Bell | Outstanding Directing in a Limited Series or a Special: Who Will Love My Children? (ABC) – John Erman; Smiley's People (Syndicated): "Part VI" – Simon Langton; Special Bulletin (NBC) – Edward Zwick; The Thorn Birds (ABC): "Part II" – Daryl Duke; The Winds of War (ABC): "Into the Maelstrom" – Dan Curtis |

=== Writing ===
Writing
| Outstanding Writing in a Comedy Series: Cheers (NBC): "Give Me a Ring Sometime" – Glen Charles and Les Charles; Buffalo Bill (NBC): "Pilot" – Tom Patchett and Jay Tarses; Cheers (NBC): "The Boys in the Bar" – Ken Levine and David Isaacs; Cheers (NBC): "Diane's Perfect Date" – David Lloyd; Taxi (NBC): "Jim's Inheritance" – Ken Estin | Outstanding Writing in a Drama Series: Hill Street Blues (NBC): "Trial by Fury" – David Milch; Hill Street Blues (NBC): "Eugene's Comedy Empire Strikes Back" – Story by : Steven Bochco, Anthony Yerkovich and Jeffrey Lewis Teleplay by : Anthony Yerkovich, David Milch and Karen Hall; Hill Street Blues (NBC): "A Hair of the Dog" – Steven Bochco, Anthony Yerkovich and Jeffrey Lewis; Hill Street Blues (NBC): "No Body's Perfect" – Story by : Steven Bochco, Anthony Yerkovich and Jeffrey Lewis Teleplay by : Michael Wagner and David Milch; Hill Street Blues (NBC): "Officer of the Year" – Karen Hall |
| Outstanding Writing in a Variety or Music Program: Second City Television (NBC): "Sweeps Week"; Second City Television (NBC): "Christmas Show"; Second City Television (NBC): "Joe Walsh"; Second City Television (NBC): "Robin Williams"; Second City Television (NBC): "Towering Inferno" | Outstanding Writing in a Limited Series or a Special: Special Bulletin (NBC) – Story by : Edward Zwick Teleplay by : Marshall Herskovitz; The Executioner's Song (NBC) – Norman Mailer; The Life and Adventures of Nicholas Nickleby (Syndicated): "Part IV" – David Edgar; Little Gloria... Happy at Last (NBC) – William Hanley; Who Will Love My Children? (ABC) – Michael Bortman |

== Most major nominations ==
Networks with multiple major nominations (Note: "Major" constitutes the categories listed above: Program, Acting, Directing, and Writing. Does not include the technical categories.)
| Network | Number of Nominations |
|---|---|
| NBC | 71 |
| ABC | 23 |
| CBS | 22 |

Programs with multiple major nominations
| Program | Category | Network | Number of Nominations |
|---|---|---|---|
| Hill Street Blues | Drama | NBC | 14 |
| Cheers | Comedy | NBC | 9 |
| The Thorn Birds | Limited | ABC | 9 |
| Second City Television | Variety | NBC | 7 |
| St. Elsewhere | Drama | NBC | 7 |
| M*A*S*H | Comedy | CBS | 6 |
| Taxi | Comedy | NBC | 6 |
| Buffalo Bill | Comedy | NBC | 5 |
| The Life and Adventures of Nicholas Nickleby | Limited | Syndicated | 4 |
| Little Gloria... Happy at Last | Special | NBC | 4 |
| Live from Lincoln Center | Variety | PBS | 4 |
| Motown 25: Yesterday, Today, Forever | Variety | NBC | 4 |
| Who Will Love My Children? | Special | ABC | 4 |
| The Winds of War | Limited | ABC | 4 |
| Cagney & Lacey | Drama | CBS | 3 |
| The Executioner's Song | Special | NBC | 3 |
| Smiley's People | Limited | Syndicated | 3 |
| Special Bulletin | Special | NBC | 3 |
| Dynasty | Drama | ABC | 2 |
| The Jeffersons | Comedy | CBS | 2 |
| M.A.D.D.: Mother's Against Drunk Drivers | Special | NBC | 2 |
| Magnum, P.I. | Drama | CBS | 2 |

== Most major awards ==
Networks with multiple major awards
| Network | Number of Awards |
|---|---|
| NBC | 19 |
| ABC | 4 |

Programs with multiple major awards
| Programs | Category | Network | Number of Awards |
|---|---|---|---|
| Cheers | Comedy | NBC | 4 |
| Hill Street Blues | Drama | NBC | 3 |
| St. Elsewhere | Drama | NBC | 3 |
| Taxi | Comedy | NBC | 3 |
| The Thorn Birds | Limited | ABC | 3 |
| Special Bulletin | Special | NBC | 2 |
