= Ron Luciano =

American baseball umpire (1937–1995)

- Born: Ronald Michael Luciano; June 28, 1937; Endicott, New York, U.S.
- Died: January 18, 1995 (aged 57); Endicott, New York, U.S.
- Resting place: Calvary Cemetery, Johnson City, New York
- Education: Syracuse University
- Occupations: Umpire, Author
- Years active: 1969–1979
- Employer: Major League Baseball

Ronald Michael Luciano (June 28, 1937 – January 18, 1995) was an American professional baseball umpire who worked in Major League Baseball's American League from 1969 to 1979. He was known for his flamboyant style, clever aphorisms, and a series of published collections of anecdotes from his colorful career.

== Early life ==
Luciano was born in Endicott, New York, a suburb of Binghamton near the Pennsylvania border, and lived his entire life there. The 6-foot-4, 260-pound Luciano was a standout offensive and defensive tackle at Syracuse University, where he majored in mathematics. He played in the 1957 Cotton Bowl and was named to the 1958 College Football All-America Team. In 1959, he played on the Orangemen's national championship squad with future Heisman Trophy winner Ernie Davis. The Detroit Lions selected him as an offensive tackle in the third round of the 1959 NFL draft; however, he suffered a serious shoulder injury in the College All-Star Game, and never played for the Lions. He was traded in 1960 to the Minnesota Vikings, who released him at the end of the season. The AFL Buffalo Bills picked him up in 1961, although a severe knee injury forced his retirement after only two games.

== Umpiring career ==
Luciano's first book

Luciano began umpiring in the Class A Florida State League in 1964, was promoted to the Double-A Eastern League in 1965 and the Triple-A International League in 1967. In 1969, he became a Major League umpire, in the American League, and remained so until his retirement just before the 1980 regular season.

As an umpire he was known for his flamboyant calls, particularly his habit of "shooting out" players. "My personal record is 16 shots; Bill Haller counted them," he wrote. "I started screaming my calls and leaping in the air, making an attraction out of myself. The fans loved it. Naturally, the League officials hated it."

For all his antics, his skills were respected by the players: In a 1974 Major League Baseball Players Association poll, Luciano was one of only two American League umpires rated "excellent."

In addition to making theatrical events of routine outs, he was considered an "individualist" who played fast and loose with the league's rules of conduct. For example, rather than working from behind second base as mandated by the American League, he would frequently stand between the pitcher and the base, National League-style. He refused to call balks, insisting that the official definition was too vague to permit consistent enforcement. "I never called a balk in my life," he wrote. "I didn't understand the rule." He once congratulated Oakland infielder Sal Bando as he rounded the bases after hitting a home run to end a long slump. "The third baseman was looking at me as if I were slightly out of my mind," he wrote. "But before he could say a word, I said firmly, 'It's okay. We're Italian.' " In 1973 during spring training, he switched positions and hats with Buddy Bell, playing a portion of an inning at third base while Bell umpired. (Both were reprimanded by the League.)

Luciano would routinely converse with players during between-inning breaks and even during play, a practice strictly forbidden by the League. While behind the plate, he would often chat with batters. In his first memoir, he recalled a situation involving future Hall of Fame outfielder Carl Yastrzemski:

I remember Yaz coming to bat in a gamer situation in Boston in 1976 ... Before I could say a word, he looked right at me and said, "Listen, Ronnie. My kid is hitting .300, my wife is fine, and I haven't heard any new jokes. I don't want to know about Polish restaurants. I'm nothing-for-15, and I want you to keep your mouth shut." What could I say? On the second pitch, he hit a home run. As he crossed home plate, he looked right at me and nodded. "Okay," he said, "you can talk to me now."

He later admitted that "on bad days following good nights"—when a hangover hampered his ability to call pitches accurately—he would sometimes allow trusted catchers, such as Elrod Hendricks, Ed Herrmann, or John Roseboro, to umpire for him:

It would work just fine. If they held the ball, I'd call it a strike. And if they threw it right back, it was a ball. If the game was close in the later innings, I'd take back control. No one I ever worked with ever took advantage of the situation. And no hitter ever figured out what I was doing. And only once (when Herrmann was calling the pitches) did a pitcher (Herrmann's own pitcher!) ever complain about a call. I smiled. I laughed. But I didn't say a word. (I was tempted, though. Really tempted.)

Luciano's antics amused players and fans, but earned him frequent reprimands from the League office:

Tommy John was pitching for the White Sox against the Orioles and accidentally dropped the ball behind him during his motion. He completed his delivery, and as a joke I called "steee-rike" on the batter. The batter, Don Buford, was aghast. He looked at me as though I was crazy. And out on the mound John was falling all over himself with laughter. I changed the call to "no pitch", of course, but John couldn't stop laughing. He walked the next three batters, gave up a double and was taken out of the game. He laughed all the way to the showers.

League President Joe Cronin sent Luciano a registered letter the next day, chiding him for "conduct unbecoming of a major league umpire".

Luciano was a member of the 1974 World Series umpire crew, but did not work the plate; the Oakland Athletics closed out the Los Angeles Dodgers in five games. Other extra-season duties included the 1971, 1975, and 1978 American League Championship Series and the 1973 All-Star Game. He was the home plate umpire for Nolan Ryan's second no-hitter in Detroit on July 15, 1973.

Luciano served two full terms as president of the Major League Umpires Association, and was one of its principal leaders and spokesmen during the 1979 umpires strike. "The umpires have kept this game honest for 100 years," he explained to a reporter, in 1978. "We're the only segment of the game that has never been touched by scandal. We gotta be too dumb to cheat. We must have integrity, because we sure don't have a normal family life. We certainly aren't properly paid. We have no health care, no job security, no tenure. Our pension plan is a joke. We take more abuse than any living group of humans, and can't give back any. If we're fired without notice, our only recourse is to appeal to the league president. And he's the guy that fires you. That's gotta be unconstitutional!"

== Weaver feud ==
Luciano was also known for a long-running feud with Orioles manager Earl Weaver, whose career closely paralleled Luciano's. The two men first met in Double-A during a four-game series in Reading, Pennsylvania in 1965; Weaver was managing the Elmira Pioneers. Luciano ejected Weaver from all four games, with the last ejection coming during the pre-game lineup exchange. After an argument with Luciano during a 1967 Triple-A game, Weaver literally stole second base, taking it to his dugout and refusing to give it back. In the majors, Luciano once ejected Weaver from both games of a doubleheader; the second ejection came, once again, before any pitches had been thrown. "The problem with Earl is that he holds a grudge," he said. "Other managers, if they disagree with a call, may holler and shout, but you can still go out for a beer with them after the game. Not Earl. He never forgets. Heck, he even holds your minor league record against you. Once, a couple of years ago, I made a controversial call at the plate. Earl charged out of the dugout, screaming that that was the same call I'd blown at Elmira in '66. That sort of thing can get to you."

Luciano ejected Weaver so often that Orioles players reportedly placed bets on the inning in which their skipper would be removed. Jim Palmer wrote that Weaver "protested any game Luciano umped." The friction became so intense that for an entire year, Luciano was transferred whenever his umpiring crew was scheduled to work an Orioles series. In the third inning of Luciano's first Orioles game a year later (August 26, 1979, at Chicago's Comiskey Park), he ejected Weaver — who in turn publicly questioned Luciano's "integrity" and received a three-game suspension. Eventually, each admitted a grudging respect for the other. Weaver said Luciano was "one of the few umpires people have paid their way into the park to see." Of Weaver, Luciano wrote, "It's impossible for me not to admire him, but it's pretty hard for me to like him."

== Personal life ==
Luciano married Polly Dixon, an airline flight attendant from Chicago, in 1974. During the baseball season they saw very little of each other, and during the off-season they could not agree on where to live: she did not want to move to upstate New York, and he did not want to live in Chicago. They had no children and divorced after less than two years. "I once went four months—from March 3 to June 28—without seeing my wife," he said. "I remember the dates because, on June 29, we decided to get a divorce."

Luciano was an enthusiastic amateur ornithologist and an avid reader. "I don't understand Shakespeare's sonnets at all, but I follow his tragedies," he said. "I like the mean characters, people like Macbeth's wife. Hey, you've got to be a masochist to be an umpire, right?"

== Retirement ==
After his retirement in 1980, Luciano spent two seasons partnered with Merle Harmon as a color commentator on NBC's Game of the Week; but he became best known as the author of five books—The Umpire Strikes Back, Strike Two, The Fall of the Roman Umpire, Remembrance of Swings Past and Baseball Lite— compilations of humorous anecdotes and reminiscences from his umpiring days. He also became a popular speaker on the banquet circuit.

In 1982 he auditioned for the role of Coach Ernie Pantusso in hit TV show Cheers, but producers "wanted an experienced actor". The part went to Nicholas Colasanto.

== Death ==
In January 1995 Luciano was found dead at age 57 in his garage at his home in Endicott, a victim of suicide via carbon monoxide poisoning. He reportedly suffered from depression for many years, and he was hospitalized for its treatment in early 1994. He is buried at the Calvary Cemetery in Johnson City, New York.

== See also ==
- List of Major League Baseball umpires (disambiguation)
