= Thanksgiving Orphans =

- Cheers episode
- Episode no.: Season 5 Episode 9
- Directed by: James Burrows
- Written by: Cheri Eichen and Bill Steinkellner
- Original air date: November 27, 1986
- Running time: 30 minutes (including commercials)

Episode chronology
← Previous "Knights of the Scimitar"	Next → "Everyone Imitates Art"
- Cheers (season 5)

"Thanksgiving Orphans" is the ninth episode of the fifth season of the American television sitcom Cheers, co-written by Cheri Eichen and Bill Steinkeller and directed by James Burrows. It aired originally on November 27, 1986, on NBC. The characters do not have families or friends to spend time with, and some of their plans backfire. They gather for a Thanksgiving feast which degenerates into a food fight. Burrows filmed the food-fight scene (which was only partially choreographed) twice. The episode had a generally positive reception. TV Guide ranked it number seven on its 100 Greatest Episodes of All Time list while The Huffington Post included the food fight sequence in a list of the 10 Most Awkward Thanksgiving Scenes of All Time from movies and television.

== Plot ==
At Thanksgiving, Sam has plans with his girlfriend Wendy. Frasier is lonely, and wants some company. Cliff's mother volunteers to feed the homeless, but Cliff—who has done this during the past year—is unwilling to do so. Norm does not want to go to his mother-in-law's overheated house where there is no beer or television. Woody is not visiting his family in Indiana. Carla's children are with her ex-husband, Nick. At Diane's insistence, Carla invites the gang for a Thanksgiving potluck. However, Diane has been invited to her American literature professor's annual Thanksgiving party where she hopes to meet William Styron.

At Carla's new house (first seen in the 1986 episode "House of Horrors with Formal Dining and Used Brick"), Norm arrives with a raw turkey and puts it in Carla's oven while he explains that Vera went to her mother's house alone. Sam arrives with dessert, but without Wendy; she and her sister, who arrived from out of town, did not want to go to Carla's. Diane then arrives, dressed as a pilgrim. At the professor's party she discovered that she had been invited to be domestic help, and left in tears. The gang decides to allow her to stay for dinner. The group relaxes before the meal and watches football. The 1986 games included: the Green Bay Packers at the Detroit Lions followed by the Seattle Seahawks at the Dallas Cowboys.

At the dining room, Diane orders them to wait for dinner until the turkey is ready. As suppertime is passing, the turkey is still very undercooked and the trimmings have gone cold. Carla and Norm start blaming each other for the turkey's slow cooking. Norm throws some of Carla's peas at her, and she then throws carrots back at him. Cliff throws mashed yams at Frasier, who accidentally throws gravy skin back at Woody, intended for Cliff. The whole gang is poised to start a food fight until Diane stands up and tells them loudly to stop. When she is close to scolding them, Sam throws cranberry sauce at her, so the food fight resumes. By the time the food fight ends, the turkey is finally cooked. The gang calms down and decides to eat what they can. Diane comes out of the kitchen and throws a pumpkin pie to spite Sam for throwing cranberry sauce at her. The pie misses Sam but accidentally hits Vera in the face as she enters. Vera tells Norm to fetch his coat, and Norm says, "Yes, dear."

== Production ==
Cheri Eichen and Bill Steinkellner wrote the episode and it was directed by James Burrows. Burrows shot the food fight scene twice, with the scene unchoreographed after the point where the character Sam Malone throws cranberry sauce at Diane Chambers' face. The extended takes resulted in a strong food odor around the set. In one of the food fight takes, the floor was covered with a "plastic tarp" in order to prevent vital materials from being broken while the cast was slipping on the floor during the scene. However, the attempt was ineffective. After the episode aired, the production crew received a few angry letters disapproving of the food fight scene "at a time when world hunger was a political cause du jour." According to Burrows, food not used for the scene was donated to charity.

Bernadette Birkett, whose husband George Wendt portrays Norm Peterson, has voiced as Norm's wife Vera in this episode and other episodes, Vera's physical appearance is portrayed by Rebecca Soladay, but Vera's face is never visible to the audience because she is struck by a pumpkin pie thrown by Diane. Neither Birkett nor Soladay is credited for the role. Birkett had previously appeared in a 1984 episode, "Fairy Tales Can Come True", as Sharon O'Hare, who dressed as Tinker Bell on Halloween.

== Reception ==
The episode aired on NBC on Thanksgiving Day, November 27, 1986. For the week ending November 30, it had the sixth highest Nielsen rating at 21.7, with a 38 share. Leigh Weingus of The Huffington Post included the food fight sequence in a list of the 10 Most Awkward Thanksgiving Scenes of All Time from movies and television. TV Guide ranked it number seven on its 100 Greatest Episodes of All Time list. IGN called it the fourth best Cheers episode, highlighting the witty dialogue and the bonding between characters.

An A.V. Club retrospective group review praised the episode, especially for the food fight. The reviewers also highlighted the effective short reference and a toast by the characters to their past colleague and friend, the late Coach Ernie Pantusso, and the setting of much of the episode at Carla's house rather than at the bar. Molly Eichel, one of the reviewers, was especially interested in moments other than the food fight, such as the "childishness" (also described as "devolution") of the characters, Diane's motherliness toward the gang, and Eichel's "favorite part", Vera's long-awaited appearance, even though her face was covered with pumpkin pie.
