= Allyce Beasley =

American actress (born 1951)

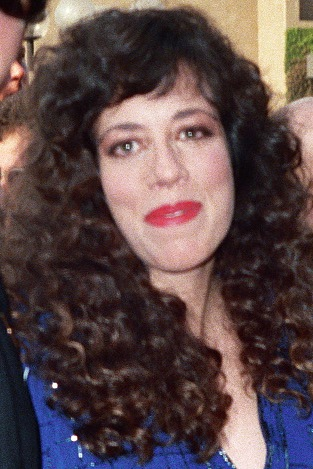
- Beasley at the 1987 Primetime Emmy Awards
- Born: Allyce Tannenberg; July 6, 1951 (age 75); Brooklyn, New York City, U.S.
- Education: SUNY Brockport
- Occupations: Actress; voice actress; comedian
- Years active: 1982–present
- Known for: Moonlighting; Legally Blonde; Coach's Daughter; Stuart Little
- Spouses: Christopher Sansocie (m. 1970; div. 1972) Vincent Schiavelli (m. 1985; div. 1988) Jim Bosche (m. 1999)
- Children: 1

Allyce Beasley (née Tannenberg; born July 6, 1951) is an American actress. She is best known for her role as rhyming, love-struck receptionist Agnes DiPesto in the television series Moonlighting. From 2001 to 2007, she was the announcer on Playhouse Disney, a morning lineup of programming for young children on Disney Channel. She appeared briefly as a guidance counselor in the comedy film Legally Blonde and played Coach's daughter, Lisa Pantusso, on Cheers.

== Early life ==
Beasley was born in Brooklyn, New York as Allyce Tannenberg, the daughter of Marvin, a magazine cartoonist, and Harriet Tannenberg, who worked as a bookkeeper. Beasley is Jewish. She and her family moved frequently during her childhood, living in Philadelphia, Long Island, and New York City, before settling in the latter location.

She studied philosophy at SUNY Brockport, aspiring to be a poet. However, Beasley developed an interest in acting and soon shifted her focus to theater. She dropped out of college and began acting in local theater productions in New Mexico. Upon returning to New York, Beasley took drama classes under Lee Strasberg during the day while working nights as a waitress to make ends meet. Her professional surname was chosen after football player Beasley Reece. She moved to Los Angeles, California, in 1982.

== Career ==
=== Television and film work ===
Early in her career, Beasley appeared as Coach Pantusso's daughter on Cheers and played the role of Latka Gravas' one night stand on the sitcom Taxi. She also made guest appearances on crime drama Remington Steele and sitcom ALF.

In 1985, she landed the role of receptionist Agnes DiPesto on Moonlighting, starring opposite Cybill Shepherd and Bruce Willis. Beasley claims to have auditioned for the role multiple times before getting the part. For her work on Moonlighting, Beasley received two Primetime Emmy Award nominations for Outstanding Supporting Actress in a Drama Series in 1986 and 1987. Beasley continued playing the character until the series ended in 1989.

Following the end of Moonlighting, Beasley was often typecast in roles similar to Agnes, which she found creatively frustrating. She was a friend of Susan Dey's character in the television film Lies and Lullabies and acted in the 1993 miniseries The Tommyknockers, based on the novel by Stephen King. Beasley started appearing in films during the 1990s, having roles in Dream with the Fishes (1997) and Stuart Little (1999).

She guest starred in one episode of Joan of Arcadia as Cat Woman God. On Bored to Death, she played the role of Florence, the mother of Jonathan Ames (Jason Schwartzman), and appeared on the YouTube Premium series Champaign ILL.

=== Voice work ===
Beasley has also worked as a voice actress. Her first voice over work was portraying two cats in the Garfield special Garfield on the Town (1983). She is best known for her role as Miss Alordayne Grotke in the popular Disney TV series Recess (1997−2001), reprising this role in the feature film Recess: School's Out (2001) and three direct-to-video specials.

She voiced herself in an episode of Johnny Bravo, made a guest appearance in the television series The Wild Thornberrys, Extreme Ghostbusters, Pound Puppies, Darkwing Duck, Lloyd in Space and Duckman in addition to voicing several characters in the video game EverQuest II.

Beasley narrated for Playhouse Disney from March 2001, until March 30, 2007. She was also the announcer for the safety video with Itchy and Scratchy that plays during The Simpsons Ride at Universal Studios Hollywood and Florida.

=== Stage work ===
During the summer of 2009, she performed onstage in The Drowsy Chaperone at Gateway Playhouse on Long Island, playing Mrs. Tottendale.

She replaced Veanne Cox in the role of Mme. Renaud/Mme. Dindon in the Tony Award-winning revival of La Cage aux Folles alongside Kelsey Grammer and Douglas Hodge on September 14, 2010.

In the spring of 2014, Beasley portrayed Doris in the musical Damn Yankees with Lora Lee Gayer at the Goodspeed Opera House in East Haddam, Connecticut.

== Personal life ==
Beasley married photographer Christopher Sansocie in 1970. They divorced in 1972. While appearing on Taxi, Beasley met actor Vincent Schiavelli. The two were married from 1985 to 1988, and had one son, Andrea Schiavelli. In 1999, Beasley married for the third time to her current husband Jim Bosche, a writer.

Beasley was diagnosed with breast cancer in 1998. After undergoing a partial mastectomy and stem cell transplant, she was declared cancer free.

== Filmography ==
=== Film ===
Year	Title	Role	Notes
1990	Silent Night, Deadly Night 4: Initiation	Janice	Direct-to-video
1991	Motorama	Chimera Receptionist	
1993	Loaded Weapon 1	Destiny Demeanor	
1993	Wilder Napalm	Announcer	
1994	Magic Kid II	Waitress	
1995	Rumpelstiltskin	Hildy	
1996	Entertaining Angels: The Dorothy Day Story	Franke	
1997	Dream with the Fishes	Sophia	
1999	Stuart Little	Beatrice Little	
1999	The Prince and the Surfer	Constance	Direct-to-video
2001	Recess: School's Out	Alordayne Grotke (voice)	
2001	Legally Blonde	CULA Advisor	
2001	Recess Christmas: Miracle on Third Street	Alordayne Grotke (voice)	Direct-to-video
2002	Wishcraft	Mom Bumpers	
2003	Recess: Taking the Fifth Grade	Alordayne Grotke (voice)	Direct-to-video
2003	Recess: All Growed Down	Alordayne Grotke (voice)	Direct-to-video
2003	Two Brothers and a Bride	Librarian	
2008	Shattered	Peg	
2013	It Goes Quiet	Margie	Short
2017	Bessie	Helen	Short
2024	8 Minutes 20 Seconds	Joan	Short
2025	Poreless	Marci	Short

=== Television ===
Year	Title	Role	Notes
1982	King's Crossing	Salesgirl	Episode: "Triangle"
1982	Taxi	Cindy Bates	Episode: "Scenskees from a Marriage"
1982	Cheers	Lisa Pantusso	Episode: "The Coach's Daughter"
1982	Filthy Rich	Darleen	Episode: "The Kidnapping of Stanley"
1983	Remington Steele	Lynette Mercer	Episode: "Steele Crazy After All These Years"
1983	One Cooks, the Other Doesn't	Mrs. Cutler	Television film
1983	Garfield on the Town	Girl Cats (voice)	Television special
1984	The Ratings Game	Paisan Receptionist	Television film
1985–1989	Moonlighting	Agnes DiPesto	Main cast
1990	ALF	Margaret	Episode: "Love on the Rocks"
1991	Superboy	Agent Harris	Episode: "A Day in the Double Life"
1991	Darkwing Duck	Tia (voice)	Episode: "U.F. Foe"
1993	The Tommyknockers	Becka Paulson	2 episodes
1996	Touched by an Angel	Kate Pound	Episode: "The Sky is Falling"
1997	Extreme Ghostbusters	Bess (voice)	Episode: "Witchy Woman"
1997–2001	Recess	Alordayne Grotke (voice)	Main cast
1998	The Wild Thornberrys	Ground Finch, Penguins (voice)	Episode: "Eliza-cology"
2000	Diagnosis: Murder	Sarah Finch	Episode: "Two Birds with One Sloan"
2000	7th Heaven	Mrs. Beasley	Episode: "Liar, Liar"
2001	Call Me Claus	Telemarketer	Television film
2004	Johnny Bravo	Herself (voice)	Episode: "Some Walk by Night"
2004	Joan of Arcadia	Woman	Episode: "The Cat"
2009	As the World Turns	Edna	4 episodes
2009	Medium	Ruth Boddicker	Episode: "The Talented Ms. Boddicker"
2010	Gravity	Karen Robinson	2 episodes
2010–2011	Bored to Death	Florence Ames	3 episodes
2015	Gotham	Dorothy Duncan	Episode: "Rogues' Gallery"
2016	Law & Order: Special Victims Unit	Mrs. Weissman	Episode: "Forty-One Witnesses"
2018	Maniac	Amelia / Subject 11	8 episodes
2018	Champaign ILL	Gayle	10 episodes
2022	New Amsterdam	Pauline	Episode: "Truth Be Told"
