= Ken Estin =

American television producer

- Occupations: Television producer, screenwriter
- Years active: 1970s–present
- Known for: Co-creating The Tracey Ullman Show, writing Elegant Iggy episode of Taxi
- Notable work: Taxi, Cheers, The Tracey Ullman Show, Beverly Hills Cop
- Awards: Emmy Award (1982, 1989), Writers Guild of America Award (1979)

Ken Estin is an American television producer and screenwriter. He has worked on Taxi and Cheers and co-created The Tracey Ullman Show with James L. Brooks. In 1982, Estin won an Emmy Award for Best Writing in a Comedy Series for the Taxi episode "Elegant Iggy" featuring Christopher Lloyd and, in 1989, he won an Emmy Award for producing The Tracey Ullman Show. Estin has had an additional eleven Emmy Award nominations and won the 1979 Writers Guild of America Award. Estin rewrote the screenplay for Beverly Hills Cop (1984) and received a special "thank you" credit in the feature film Big (1988).

Estin co-wrote the sitcom Shaping Up with Sam Simon.

Estin worked on as executive producer for the short-lived NBC/UPN show Minor Adjustments through Ken Estin Entertainment.
