= Coach Ernie Pantusso =

Fictional character in the series Cheers

Ernie "Coach" Pantusso
- Coach ruins the blender by mixing a recipe with the coconut cup in "Cliff's Rocky Moment" (episode 38, 1984)
- First appearance: Give Me a Ring Sometime (episode 1.01)
- Last appearance: Rescue Me (episode 3.25)
- Portrayed by: Nicholas Colasanto

In-universe information
- Occupation: Baseball coach (retired); Assistant bartender (1982–1985) (until death)
- Family: Two unnamed brothers Unnamed sister
- Spouse: Angela (deceased)
- Children: Lisa Pantusso (daughter)
- Relatives: Joyce Pantusso (niece); Phyllis Pantusso (sister-in-law)

Ernie Pantusso (or Pantuso), commonly known as "Coach", is a fictional character on the American television show Cheers, portrayed by Nicholas Colasanto from 1982 to 1985. Coach is Sam Malone's former baseball coach, who becomes a bartender at Cheers under Sam's ownership. He is not "worldly wise" but has some shred of wit. He had a daughter, Lisa, who appeared in the episode "Coach's Daughter", by his late wife, Angela.

While he last appeared in the cold opening of "Rescue Me", Colasanto's last filmed appearance as Coach was in the episode "Cheerio, Cheers". When Colasanto died in 1985, Coach was written out as deceased without cause of death stated. Woody Harrelson joined the cast as Woody Boyd, a pen pal of Coach's who would end up replacing him as a bartender at Cheers for the remainder of the series.

== Casting ==
Former umpire Ron Luciano auditioned for Coach Ernie Pantusso (or Pantuso), but he failed to get the part because producers "wanted an experienced actor". Robert Prosky, who later appeared in the eleventh-season episode "Daddy's Little Middle-Aged Girl" (1992) as the father of character Rebecca Howe, was originally offered the role of Coach, but he turned down the role. John Madden was also offered the role, but also turned it down. Therefore, the role went to Colasanto.

According to Colasanto, Coach was nearly "child-like" and more of a surrogate "son" than a surrogate "father" to Sam Malone (Ted Danson), while Sam was more of a "father" to Coach for dependency on Sam's "moral support". Moreover, Coach was beloved by everyone and a good "lovable man". According to director and producer James Burrows, the character of Coach was much different from the actor Nick: Coach was slow, while Nick was sharp.

Coach is a component of many people. [...] [He] is not a worldly man [and] not well-read. He comes from the dugouts. He may be intelligent, but he's not worldly wise. He's so positive; that's what makes him funny. He'll say the most absurd thing, but, if someone corrects him, he immediately capitulates because he doesn't want to offend anyone.

— Nicholas Colasanto, The Associated Press, August 1984

== Role ==
Ernie "Coach" Pantusso was a somewhat dim, forgetful bartender with a gravel voice, a caring personality, and a warm heart. Colasanto himself said of the character: "The Coach doesn't have any worldly ambitions — he's very happy to make his paycheck, and drink with the boys,". Moreover, he listened to people and their problems very well.

Ernie was nicknamed "Coach" because he was a baseball coach with the Boston Red Sox and other teams, like the minor league baseball team Pawtucket Red Sox (discovered in "The Tortelli Tort", episode 3 [1982]). When Sam succumbed to alcoholism, leading to the end of his baseball career, Sam bought the bar Cheers and hired Coach as a bartender. He is still nicknamed "Coach" by everyone, although he has been retired from coaching for years.

As a young man, Ernie attended Catholic schools, but dropped out of high school to join the Navy. He has a sister and two brothers; the younger brother has a daughter Joyce (Cady McClain), who appears in only "The Godfather, Part III" (episode 117, 1987). As learned in "An American Family" (season 3, episode 9), he served in the Vietnam War.

Coach is a widower as his wife Angela died before the show debuted. They have a daughter, Lisa (Allyce Beasley), who appeared in the episode "Coach's Daughter" (1982). He has had numerous love interests, like the widow Irene Blanchard (played by Bette Ford) in the two-part episode "Coach in Love", who breaks off the engagement after winning the lottery and later marries a millionaire. He later earns his high school diploma for passing a geography class in "Teacher's Pet" (1985).

In the two-part episode "Rebound" (1984), after Sam and Diane ended their on-and-off relationship, Coach goes to Diane Chambers' (Shelley Long) apartment to inform her about Sam's relapse into alcoholism, so she brings in her love interest, a psychiatrist Frasier Crane, to help Sam cope with his alcoholism. Coach cunningly convinces the trio reasons to rehire Diane as a waitress again, such as preventing Sam's relapse, Diane from losing her mind again, and Sam and Diane from thinking about each other.

== Death ==
I don't think anything will happen this season. There's a great deal of talking to be done, and nothing is definite. But we're a realistic show, and we will deal with what happened to the coach in a realistic manner.

— James Burrows (February 14, 1985)

Colasanto, who played Coach, had heart disease since the mid-1970s exacerbated by alcoholism. After years of sobriety, during production his heart disease worsened. Castmates noticed his weight loss, although Colasanto kept the severity of his illness a secret. Shortly after Christmas 1984, Colasanto was admitted to a local hospital with water in his lungs. Co-star Ted Danson later said that the veteran actor had difficulty remembering his lines during production that season. After he was released from the hospital, Colasanto's doctor recommended that he not return to work. Although he appeared in the cold opening of the third-season finale ("Rescue Me"), his last full episode was "Cheerio Cheers" (filmed in late November 1984).

Following Colasanto's death by heart attack on February 12, 1985, the show's creators decided not to recast Coach's role. As the series episodes were filmed out of order, with the third season finale filmed early for logistical production reasons, writing Coach out immediately was not possible. Accordingly, for several episodes, Coach was said to be out of town for various reasons in the episodes in which he did not appear.

At the beginning of season 4, Coach was written out of the show as having died offscreen. There was no cause of death revealed for the character.

Coach was replaced in the episode "Birth, Death, Love and Rice" (episode 70, 1985) by co-bartender Woody Boyd, portrayed by Woody Harrelson. Apparently Coach and Woody were "Pen Pals" exchanging pens in the mail. Sam explained to Woody that Coach died recently. When Sam visited Diane, she expressed sympathy about Coach's death. Coach was referenced occasionally thereafter, including Sam's toast dedication "to Coach" in "Thanksgiving Orphans" (1986) and the time that his niece Joyce appears in one episode, "The Godfather, Part III" (1987). In the final moments of the series finale, "One for the Road", Sam straightens a photograph of Geronimo, used by Colasanto in his dressing room. The photo was hanging at the bar wall of the stage set "as a remembrance."

== Reception ==
Colasanto was Emmy-nominated three times as an Outstanding Supporting Actor in a Comedy Series for his role of Coach, including a posthumous award nomination in 1985, but never won. On April 19, 1985, Colasanto was awarded posthumously the Best Supporting Actor by Viewers for Quality Television, a defunct non-profit organization that determined what was considered high-quality on television, for this role. Michael Hill from The Baltimore Evening Sun called Coach "the brilliant character". Robert Bianco praised Coach as the "heart" of the show, an ensemble's father figure, and Diane Chambers' "dependable ally". Bianco praised Coach for giving heart to the "Sam and Diane" story and for making the show a "classic". He was devastated that the actor and the character himself died, and he was disappointed that the show was not as great without him. Despite Coach's replacement Woody Boyd, Bianco considered Coach irreplaceable.

Ted Danson, who played Sam Malone on Cheers, felt that the show lost its "heart and soul" following Colasanto's death. Bill Simmons, previous writer of ESPN, praised Coach for making the show a "show", yet he felt that his death transformed the show into a "sitcom". A writer using a pseudonym, Joe Sixpack, from Philadelphia Daily News, named Coach his second most-favorite "complete professional" bartender with a warm heart to customers, despite his limited range of intelligence. Columnist Amber Lee from the Bleacher Report website called Coach one of "25 funniest coaches of film and television".

Jeffrey Robinson of the DVD Talk website praised Colasanto's performance for executing many dimensions to his character Coach, as opposed to his replacement Woody Boyd, whom he found one-dimensional and clueless. Adam Arseneau disdained the show for, in his view, improperly honoring the memory of Colasanto by poorly handling his character Coach's disappearance in the third season and death in the fourth.

== Bibliography ==
- Snauffer, Douglas (2008). The Show Must Go On: How the Deaths of Lead Actors Have Affected Television Series. Jefferson, North Carolina: McFarland. ISBN 978-0-7864-3295-0.
- Bjorklund, Dennis (1997). Cheers TV Show: A Comprehensive Reference. Praetorian Publishing. ISBN 978-0-9679852-3-7.
