= Nicholas Colasanto =

American actor and director (1924–1985)

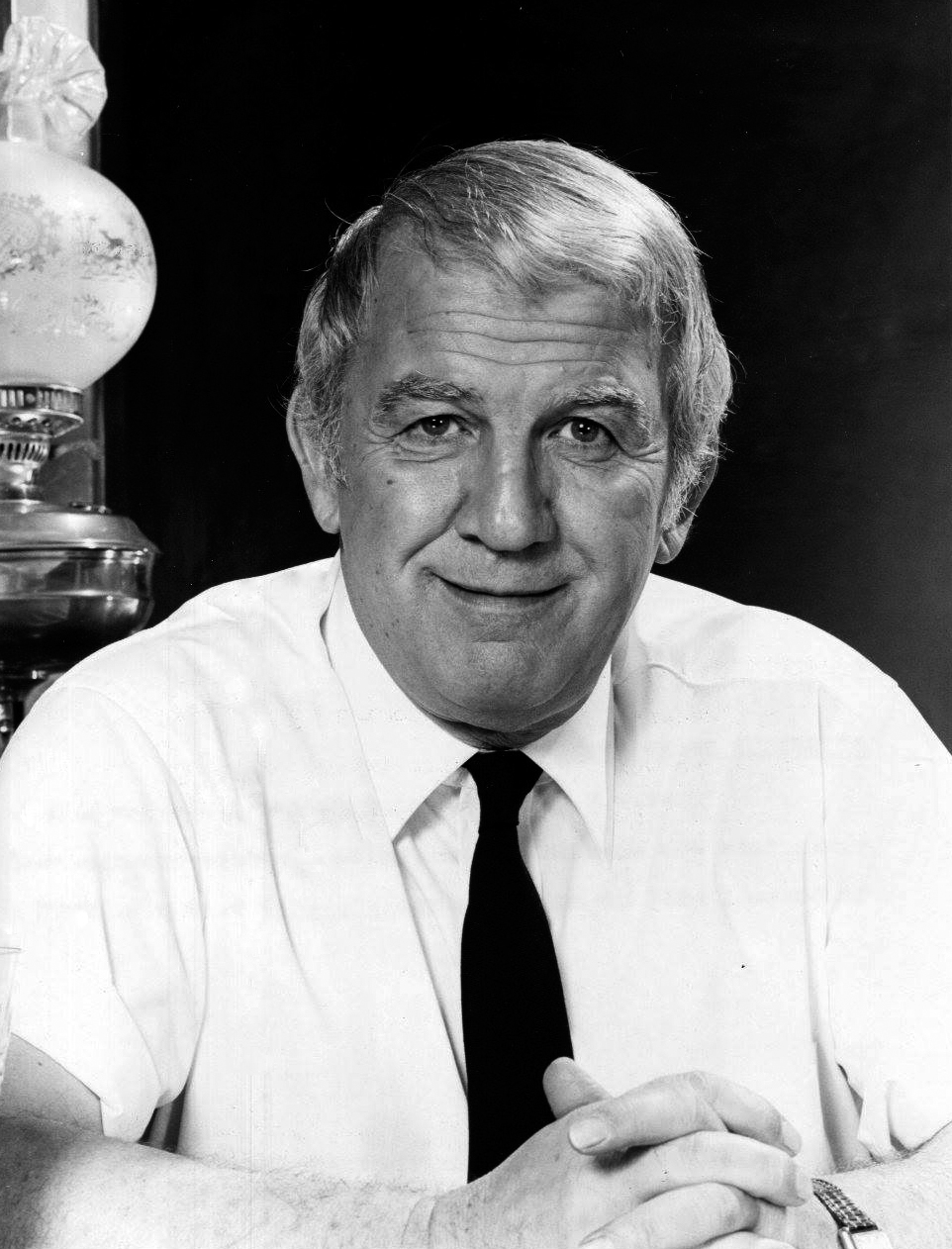
- Colasanto as Coach Ernie Pantusso in Cheers, 1982
- Born: January 19, 1924; Providence, Rhode Island, U.S.
- Died: February 12, 1985 (aged 61); Los Angeles, California, U.S.
- Resting place: Saint Ann Cemetery, Cranston, Rhode Island
- Education: Bryant University; American Academy of Dramatic Arts
- Occupations: Actor; television director
- Years active: 1959–1985
- Military career
- Allegiance: United States
- Branch: United States Navy
- Rank: Coxswain
- Conflicts: World War II

Nicholas Colasanto (January 19, 1924 – February 12, 1985) was an American actor and television director. He is best known for his role as Ernie Pantusso in the American television sitcom Cheers (1982–1985).

== Early life ==
Colasanto was born on January 19, 1924, in Providence, Rhode Island, to Giuseppe "Joseph" Colasanto (1889 – 1944) and Maria "Mary" Colasanto (née Gelfoni; 1889 – 1955), both first-generation Italian Americans. Colasanto attended Bryant University (now located in Smithfield, Rhode Island) and was a decorated veteran of World War II, during which he served as a coxswain in the United States Navy.

== Early career ==
By 1951, he was a bookkeeper. Around 1954, he intended to work as an accountant for a company in Saudi Arabia. Inspired by Henry Fonda's performance in the Broadway play Mister Roberts, Colasanto applied to the American Academy of Dramatic Arts but was rejected, so he joined a small theater company instead in Phoenix, Arizona.

== Acting and directing career ==
Colasanto is best known for his role as Coach Ernie Pantusso, a character in the television sitcom Cheers. His early acting career included a theatrical play A Hatful of Rain (1956), starring Ben Gazzarra, and another role that earned him an Obie Award nomination in 1962. He also directed episodes of many television series, including Hawaii Five-O, Starsky & Hutch, The Streets of San Francisco, Bonanza, Columbo, and CHiPs. He also appeared in feature films, including The Counterfeit Killer (1968), Fat City (1972), and Alfred Hitchcock's Family Plot (1976).

Colasanto was in demand as an actor and director, but in the mid-1970s he was diagnosed with heart disease, which was exacerbated by his alcoholism. After twenty years of alcoholism, he became an active member of Alcoholics Anonymous from March 31, 1976, and became sober in the same year. In the late 1970s, he began having difficulty securing directing jobs as his health was declining. His last major film role was as mob boss Tommy Como in Raging Bull (1980).

Colasanto was preparing to retire when the role of Coach Ernie Pantusso was offered to him on Cheers. Coach would become his best known role. By the third season of Cheers, Colasanto's health had seriously deteriorated. His fellow cast members noticed his weight loss, but Colasanto kept the severity of his illness secret. Shortly after the Christmas holiday in 1984, he was admitted to a local hospital for water in his lungs. Co-star Ted Danson later said Colasanto had difficulty remembering his lines during production of the season.

When Colasanto was released from the hospital in the week of January 28 – February 3, 1985, after a two-week stay, his doctor recommended he not return to work. Although he appeared in the cold opening of the third-season finale episode "Rescue Me" (1985), Colasanto's last full episode was "Cheerio Cheers" (1985), which was filmed in late November 1984.

== Death ==
Colasanto died of a heart attack at his home on February 12, 1985, at the age of 61. A memorial service was held in North Hollywood, Los Angeles, and attended by the full staff and cast of Cheers. In addition, over 300 mourners, including castmate John Ratzenberger, attended the February 16 funeral Mass at Holy Cross Church in Providence. Colasanto is buried in Saint Ann Cemetery in Cranston, Rhode Island.

On April 19, 1985, Colasanto was posthumously awarded the Best Supporting Actor by Viewers for Quality Television, a non-profit organization that determined what was considered high-quality on television.

Colasanto's character was written out of the show as also having died. The fourth-season premiere episode, "Birth, Death, Love and Rice" (1985), deals with Coach's death and introduces Colasanto's successor Woody Harrelson, who played Woody Boyd. Colasanto had hung a picture of Geronimo in his dressing room. After his death, the picture was placed on the wall in the bar of the Cheers production set in his memory. Near the end of the final episode of Cheers in 1993, eight years after Colasanto's death, bar owner Sam Malone (Ted Danson) walks over to the picture and straightens it.

== Selected filmography ==
=== Film ===
- The Counterfeit Killer (1968) – Plainclothesman
- Fat City (1972) – Ruben
- The Manchu Eagle Murder Caper Mystery (1975) – Bert
- Family Plot (1976) – Constantine
- Raging Bull (1980) – Tommy Como, mob boss

=== Television ===
==== Actor ====
- Cheers (1982–1985) – Coach Ernie Pantusso, co-bartender (final appearance)
- The Streets of San Francisco – "Deathwatch" (1973)
- Baretta – "The Secret Of Terry Lake" (1975)

==== Director ====
- Run for Your Life (1965–1968)
- Ironside – "The Challenge" (1968)
- Hawaii Five-O – "A Thousand Pardons, You're Dead" (1969), "To Hell with Babe Ruth" (1969), "Just Lucky, I Guess" (1969), and "Most Likely to Murder" (1970)
- Bonanza – "Ambush at Rio Lobo" (1972), "The Twenty-Sixth Grave" (1972)
- Hec Ramsey – "The Detroit Connection" (1973)
- Columbo – "Étude in Black" (1972) and "Swan Song" (1974)
- Nakia (1974) – "No Place to Hide" and "A Matter of Choice"
- Logan's Run – "Man Out of Time" (1977)
- The Name of the Game
- Starsky & Hutch
- The Streets of San Francisco
- CHiPs

== Sources ==
- Bjorklund, Dennis A. Cheers TV Show: A Comprehensive Reference. Praetorian Publishing. pp. 35–39.
- Rhodes, Karen (1997). Booking Hawaii Five-O: An Episode Guide and Critical History of the 1968–1980 Television Detective Series. Jefferson, North Carolina: McFarland & Company, Inc. ISBN 978-0-7864-3108-3.
- Snauffer, Douglas (2008). The Show Must Go On: How the Deaths of Lead Actors Have Affected Television Series. Jefferson, NC: McFarland & Company, Inc. ISBN 978-0-7864-3295-0.
