= List of awards and nominations received by Cheers =

Cheers is an American situation comedy. It has won and been nominated for a variety of different awards, including 13 Emmy Award nominations for its first season alone, the most nominations a comedy series had ever received at that time. The show went on to receive a total of 179 Primetime Emmy nominations, winning a total of 28 over the course of its eleven seasons.

== American Comedy Awards ==
| Year | Category | Nominee | Result |
|---|---|---|---|
| 1987 | Funniest Newcomer - Male or Female | Woody Harrelson | Won |
| 1989 | Funniest Supporting Female Performer in a TV Series | Rhea Perlman | Won |
| 1990 | Funniest Female Performer in a TV Series (Leading Role) Network, Cable or Syndication | Kirstie Alley | Nominated |
| 1990 | Funniest Male Performer in a TV Series (Leading Role) Network, Cable or Syndication | Ted Danson | Nominated |
| 1990 | Funniest Supporting Female Performer in a TV Series | Rhea Perlman | Nominated |
| 1990 | Funniest Supporting Male Performer in a TV Series | Woody Harrelson | Nominated |
| 1991 | Funniest Male Performer in a TV Series (Leading Role) Network, Cable or Syndication | Ted Danson | Won |

== Directors Guild of America Awards ==
| Year | Category | Nominee(s) | Episode | Result |
|---|---|---|---|---|
| 1983 | Outstanding Directorial Achievement in Comedy Series | James Burrows | "Sam at Eleven" | Nominated |
| 1984 | Outstanding Directorial Achievement in Comedy Series | James Burrows | "Showdown: Part 2" | Won |
| 1985 | Outstanding Directorial Achievement in Comedy Series | James Burrows | "I Call Your Name" | Nominated |
| 1986 | Outstanding Directorial Achievement in Comedy Series | James Burrows | "Birth, Death, Love and Rice" | Nominated |
| 1987 | Outstanding Directorial Achievement in Comedy Series | James Burrows | "Tan 'n' Wash" | Nominated |
| 1988 | Outstanding Directorial Achievement in Comedy Series | James Burrows | "Home is the Sailor" | Nominated |
| 1990 | Outstanding Directorial Achievement in Comedy Series | James Burrows | "Sisterly Love" | Nominated |
| 1991 | Outstanding Directorial Achievement in Comedy Series | James Burrows | "Woody Interruptus" | Won |
| 1992 | Outstanding Directorial Achievement in Comedy Series | James Burrows | "Days Of Wine & Neurosis" | Nominated |
| 1993 | Outstanding Directorial Achievement in Comedy Series | James Burrows | "An Old-Fashioned Wedding" | Nominated |

== Emmy Awards ==
Cheers received 117 Emmy Award nominations over its eleven seasons.

=== Primetime Emmy Awards ===
| Year | Category | Nominee(s) | Episode | Result |
|---|---|---|---|---|
| 1983 | Outstanding Comedy Series | ^{See below} | | Won |
| 1983 | Outstanding Lead Actress in a Comedy Series | Shelley Long | "Give Me a Ring Sometime" | Won |
| 1983 | Outstanding Writing in a Comedy Series | Glen Charles, Les Charles | "Give Me a Ring Sometime" | Won |
| 1983 | Outstanding Directing in a Comedy Series | James Burrows | "Showdown: Part 2" | Won |
| 1983 | Outstanding Lead Actor in a Comedy Series | Ted Danson | | Nominated |
| 1983 | Outstanding Supporting Actor in a Comedy, Variety or Music Series | Nicholas Colasanto | | Nominated |
| 1983 | Outstanding Supporting Actress in a Comedy, Variety or Music Series | Rhea Perlman | | Nominated |
| 1983 | Outstanding Writing in a Comedy Series | David Lloyd | "Diane's Perfect Date" | Nominated |
| 1983 | Outstanding Writing in a Comedy Series | Ken Levine, David Isaacs | "The Boys in the Bar" | Nominated |
| 1984 | Outstanding Comedy Series | ^{See below} | | Won |
| 1984 | Outstanding Supporting Actress in a Comedy Series | Rhea Perlman | | Won |
| 1984 | Outstanding Writing in a Comedy Series | David Angell | "Old Flames" | Won |
| 1984 | Outstanding Lead Actor in a Comedy Series | Ted Danson | | Nominated |
| 1984 | Outstanding Lead Actress in a Comedy Series | Shelley Long | | Nominated |
| 1984 | Outstanding Supporting Actor in a Comedy Series | Nicholas Colasanto | | Nominated |
| 1984 | Outstanding Supporting Actor in a Comedy Series | George Wendt | | Nominated |
| 1984 | Outstanding Writing in a Comedy Series | Glen Charles, Les Charles | "Power Play" | Nominated |
| 1984 | Outstanding Writing in a Comedy Series | David Lloyd | "Homicidal Ham" | Nominated |
| 1984 | Outstanding Directing in a Comedy Series | James Burrows | "Old Flames" | Nominated |
| 1985 | Outstanding Supporting Actress in a Comedy Series | Rhea Perlman | | Won |
| 1985 | Outstanding Comedy Series | ^{See below} | | Nominated |
| 1985 | Outstanding Lead Actor in a Comedy Series | Ted Danson | | Nominated |
| 1985 | Outstanding Lead Actress in a Comedy Series | Shelley Long | | Nominated |
| 1985 | Outstanding Supporting Actor in a Comedy Series | Nicholas Colasanto | | Nominated |
| 1985 | Outstanding Supporting Actor in a Comedy Series | John Ratzenberger | | Nominated |
| 1985 | Outstanding Supporting Actor in a Comedy Series | George Wendt | | Nominated |
| 1985 | Outstanding Writing in a Comedy Series | Peter Casey, David Lee | "I Call Your Name" | Nominated |
| 1985 | Outstanding Writing in a Comedy Series | Glen Charles, Les Charles | "Rebound, Part 2" | Nominated |
| 1985 | Outstanding Writing in a Comedy Series | David Lloyd | "Sam Turns the Other Cheek" | Nominated |
| 1985 | Outstanding Directing in a Comedy Series | James Burrows | "Cheerio, Cheers" | Nominated |
| 1986 | Outstanding Supporting Actress in a Comedy Series | Rhea Perlman | | Won |
| 1986 | Outstanding Comedy Series | ^{See below} | | Nominated |
| 1986 | Outstanding Lead Actor in a Comedy Series | Ted Danson | | Nominated |
| 1986 | Outstanding Lead Actress in a Comedy Series | Shelley Long | | Nominated |
| 1986 | Outstanding Supporting Actor in a Comedy Series | John Ratzenberger | | Nominated |
| 1986 | Outstanding Supporting Actor in a Comedy Series | George Wendt | | Nominated |
| 1986 | Outstanding Writing in a Comedy Series | Peter Casey, David Lee | "2 Good 2 Be 4 Real" | Nominated |
| 1986 | Outstanding Directing in a Comedy Series | James Burrows | "The Triangle" | Nominated |
| 1987 | Outstanding Guest Performer in a Comedy Series | John Cleese for playing "Dr. Simon Finch-Royce" | "Simon Says" | Won |
| 1987 | Outstanding Comedy Series | ^{See below} | | Nominated |
| 1987 | Outstanding Lead Actor in a Comedy Series | Ted Danson | "Diamond Sam" | Nominated |
| 1987 | Outstanding Supporting Actor in a Comedy Series | Woody Harrelson | | Nominated |
| 1987 | Outstanding Supporting Actor in a Comedy Series | George Wendt | | Nominated |
| 1987 | Outstanding Supporting Actress in a Comedy Series | Rhea Perlman | | Nominated |
| 1987 | Outstanding Writing in a Comedy Series | Janet Leahy | "Abnormal Psychology" | Nominated |
| 1987 | Outstanding Directing in a Comedy Series | James Burrows | "Chambers vs. Malone" | Nominated |
| 1988 | Outstanding Comedy Series | ^{See below} | | Nominated |
| 1988 | Outstanding Lead Actor in a Comedy Series | Ted Danson | | Nominated |
| 1988 | Outstanding Lead Actress in a Comedy Series | Kirstie Alley | "Backseat Becky, Upfront" | Nominated |
| 1988 | Outstanding Supporting Actor in a Comedy Series | Kelsey Grammer | "The Crane Mutiny" | Nominated |
| 1988 | Outstanding Supporting Actor in a Comedy Series | Woody Harrelson | "The Big Kiss-Off" | Nominated |
| 1988 | Outstanding Supporting Actor in a Comedy Series | George Wendt | "Let Sleeping Drakes Lie" | Nominated |
| 1988 | Outstanding Supporting Actress in a Comedy Series | Rhea Perlman | "Slumber Party Massacred" | Nominated |
| 1988 | Outstanding Writing in a Comedy Series | Glen Charles, Les Charles | "Home Is the Sailor" | Nominated |
| 1988 | Outstanding Directing in a Comedy Series | James Burrows | "Backseat Becky, Up Front" | Nominated |
| 1989 | Outstanding Comedy Series | ^{See below} | | Won |
| 1989 | Outstanding Supporting Actor in a Comedy Series | Woody Harrelson | "Golden Boyd" + "The Gift of the Woodi" + "Call Me Irresponsible" | Won |
| 1989 | Outstanding Supporting Actress in a Comedy Series | Rhea Perlman | "Swear to God" + "Those Lips, Those Ice" + "I Kid You Not" | Won |
| 1989 | Outstanding Lead Actor in a Comedy Series | Ted Danson | "Swear to God" | Nominated |
| 1989 | Outstanding Supporting Actor in a Comedy Series | George Wendt | "Norm, Is That You?" + "Jumping Jerks" + "Don't Paint Your Chickens" | Nominated |
| 1989 | Outstanding Directing in a Comedy Series | James Burrows | "The Visiting Lecher" | Nominated |
| 1990 | Outstanding Lead Actor in a Comedy Series | Ted Danson | "Cry Harder, Part II" | Won |
| 1990 | Outstanding Supporting Actress in a Comedy Series | Bebe Neuwirth | "The Stork Brings a Crane" + "Severe Crane Damage" + "The Ghost and Mrs. Lebec" | Won |
| 1990 | Outstanding Comedy Series | ^{See below} | | Nominated |
| 1990 | Outstanding Lead Actress in a Comedy Series | Kirstie Alley | "The Improbable Dream, Part I" | Nominated |
| 1990 | Outstanding Supporting Actor in a Comedy Series | Kelsey Grammer | "The Stork Brings a Crane" + "Severe Crane Damage" + "The Ghost and Mrs. Lebec" | Nominated |
| 1990 | Outstanding Supporting Actor in a Comedy Series | Woody Harrelson | "Woody or Won't He" + "50–50 Carla" + "Loverboyd" | Nominated |
| 1990 | Outstanding Supporting Actress in a Comedy Series | Rhea Perlman | "Death Takes a Holiday on Ice" + "50–50 Carla" + "The Ghost and Mrs. Lebec" | Nominated |
| 1990 | Outstanding Guest Actress in a Comedy Series | Georgia Brown for playing "Madame Lazora" | "The Ghost and Mrs. LeBec" | Nominated |
| 1990 | Outstanding Guest Actress in a Comedy Series | Alexis Smith for playing "Alice Anne Volkman" | "Sammy and the Professor" | Nominated |
| 1990 | Outstanding Writing in a Comedy Series | Ken Levine, David Isaacs | "Death Takes a Holiday on Ice" | Nominated |
| 1990 | Outstanding Directing in a Comedy Series | James Burrows | "The Improbable Dream, Part 1" | Nominated |
| 1991 | Outstanding Comedy Series | ^{See below} | | Won |
| 1991 | Outstanding Lead Actress in a Comedy Series | Kirstie Alley | "The Days of Wine and Neuroses" | Won |
| 1991 | Outstanding Supporting Actress in a Comedy Series | Bebe Neuwirth | "Veggie-Boyd" + "Rat Girl" | Won |
| 1991 | Outstanding Directing in a Comedy Series | James Burrows | "Woody Interruptus" | Won |
| 1991 | Outstanding Lead Actor in a Comedy Series | Ted Danson | "Bad Neighbor Sam" | Nominated |
| 1991 | Outstanding Supporting Actor in a Comedy Series | Woody Harrelson | "Veggie-Boyd" + "Woody Interruptus" | Nominated |
| 1991 | Outstanding Supporting Actress in a Comedy Series | Rhea Perlman | "Carla Loves Clavin" + "Pitch It Again, Sam" | Nominated |
| 1991 | Outstanding Guest Actor in a Comedy Series | Sheldon Leonard for playing "Sid Nelson" | "Grease" | Nominated |
| 1991 | Outstanding Guest Actress in a Comedy Series | Frances Sternhagen for playing "Esther Clavin" | "Ma Always Liked You Best" | Nominated |
| 1991 | Outstanding Guest Actress in a Comedy Series | Sada Thompson for playing "Mama Lozupone" | "Honor Thy Mother" | Nominated |
| 1992 | Outstanding Comedy Series | ^{See below} | | Nominated |
| 1992 | Outstanding Lead Actor in a Comedy Series | Ted Danson | "Go Make" | Nominated |
| 1992 | Outstanding Lead Actress in a Comedy Series | Kirstie Alley | "An Old Fashioned Wedding" | Nominated |
| 1992 | Outstanding Supporting Actor in a Comedy Series | Harvey Fierstein | "Rebecca's Lover... Not" | Nominated |
| 1992 | Outstanding Supporting Actress in a Comedy Series | Frances Sternhagen | "Heeeeeere’s... Cliffy!" | Nominated |
| 1992 | Outstanding Directing in a Comedy Series | James Burrows | "An Old Fashioned Wedding" | Nominated |
| 1993 | Outstanding Lead Actor in a Comedy Series | Ted Danson | "The Guy Can't Help It" | Won |
| 1993 | Outstanding Comedy Series | ^{See below} | | Nominated |
| 1993 | Outstanding Lead Actress in a Comedy Series | Kirstie Alley | "One for the Road" | Nominated |
| 1993 | Outstanding Supporting Actress in a Comedy Series | Rhea Perlman | "Loathe and Marriage" + "It’s Lonely on the Top" | Nominated |
| 1993 | Outstanding Guest Actor in a Comedy Series | Tom Berenger for playing "Don Santry" | "One for the Road" | Nominated |
| 1993 | Outstanding Guest Actress in a Comedy Series | Shelley Long for playing "Diane Chambers" | "One for the Road" | Nominated |
| 1993 | Outstanding Directing in a Comedy Series | James Burrows | "One for the Road" | Nominated |

^1983 "Outstanding Comedy Series" Nominees James Burrows, Glen Charles, Les Charles, David Isaacs, Ken Levine

^1984 "Outstanding Comedy Series" Nominees James Burrows, Glen Charles, Les Charles

^1985 "Outstanding Comedy Series" Nominees James Burrows, Glen Charles, Les Charles, Ken Estin, Sam Simon

^1986 "Outstanding Comedy Series" Nominees James Burrows, Glen Charles, Les Charles, Peter Casey, David Lee, Heide Perlman, David Angell, Tim Berry

^1987 & 1988 "Outstanding Comedy Series" Nominees James Burrows, Glen Charles, Les Charles, Peter Casey, David Lee, David Angell, Tim Berry

^1989 "Outstanding Comedy Series" Nominees James Burrows, Glen Charles, Les Charles, Peter Casey, David Lee, David Angell, Phoef Sutton, Tim Berry

^1990 "Outstanding Comedy Series" Nominees James Burrows, Glen Charles, Les Charles, Peter Casey, David Lee, David Angell, Phoef Sutton, Tim Berry, Andy Ackerman

^1991 "Outstanding Comedy Series" Nominees James Burrows, Glen Charles, Les Charles, Cherie Steinkellner, Bill Steinkellner, Phoef Sutton, Tim Berry, Andy Ackerman, Brian Pollack, Mert Rich, Dan O'Shannon, Tom Anderson, Larry Balmagia

^1992 "Outstanding Comedy Series" Nominees James Burrows, Glen Charles, Les Charles, Cherie Steinkellner, Bill Steinkellner, Phoef Sutton, Dan O'Shannon, Tom Anderson, Tim Berry, Dan Staley, Rob Long

^1993 "Outstanding Comedy Series" Nominees James Burrows, Glen Charles, Les Charles, Dan O'Shannon, Tom Anderson, Rob Long, Dan Staley, Tim Berry

=== Creative Arts Emmy Awards ===
| Year | Category | Nominee(s) | Episode | Result |
|---|---|---|---|---|
| 1983 | Outstanding Individual Achievement in Graphic Design and Title Sequences | James Castle, Bruce Bryant | "Show Down: Part 1" | Won |
| 1983 | Outstanding Achievement in Music and Lyrics | Gary Portnoy, Judy Hart-Angelo for Where Everybody Knows Your Name | "Give Me a Ring Sometime" | Nominated |
| 1983 | Outstanding Art Direction for a Series | George Gaines, Richard Sylbert | "Give Me a Ring Sometime" | Nominated |
| 1983 | Outstanding Film Editing for a Series | Andrew Chulack | "Endless Slumper" | Nominated |
| 1984 | Outstanding Film Editing for a Series | Andrew Chulack | "Old Flames" | Won |
| 1984 | Outstanding Live and Tape Sound Mixing and Sound Effects for a Series | Sam Black, Douglas Gray, Thomas Huth, Gordon Klimuck | "No Help Wanted" | Nominated |
| 1985 | Outstanding Live and Tape Sound Mixing and Sound Effects for a Series | Michael Ballin, Sam Black, Douglas Gray, Thomas Huth | "The Executive's Executioner" | Won |
| 1986 | Outstanding Sound Mixing for a Comedy Series or a Special | Michael Ballin, Robert Douglas, Douglas Grey, Thomas J. Huth | "Fear is My Co-Pilot" | Won |
| 1986 | Outstanding Editing for a Series (Multi-Camera Production) | Andy Ackerman | "Birth, Death, Love and Rice" | Nominated |
| 1986 | Outstanding Editing for a Series (Multi-Camera Production) | Douglas Hines | "The Triangle" | Nominated |
| 1987 | Outstanding Sound Mixing for a Comedy Series or a Special | Michael Ballin, Bob Douglas, Doug Grey, Tom Huth | "The Proposal" | Won |
| 1987 | Outstanding Editing for a Series (Multi-Camera Production) | Andy Ackerman | "Cheers: The Motion Picture" | Nominated |
| 1988 | Outstanding Editing for a Series (Multi-Camera Production) | Andy Ackerman | "The Big Kiss-Off" | Won |
| 1988 | Outstanding Sound Mixing for a Comedy Series or a Special | Bob Douglas, Doug Grey, Thomas J. Huth, Pete San Filipo | "The Last Angry Mailman" | Nominated |
| 1989 | Outstanding Sound Mixing for a Comedy Series or a Special | Sam Black, Robert Crosby, Jr., Robert Douglass, Thomas J. Huth | "Jumping Jerks" | Nominated |
| 1990 | Outstanding Sound Mixing for a Comedy Series or a Special | Sam Black, Robert Crosby, Jr., Robert Douglass, Thomas J. Huth | "The Stork Brings a Crane" | Won |
| 1991 | Outstanding Informational Special | ^{See above} | "Cheers 200th Anniversary Special" | Nominated |
| 1991 | Outstanding Editing for a Miniseries or a Special - Multi-Camera Production | Andy Ackerman | "Cheers 200th Anniversary Special" | Nominated |
| 1991 | Outstanding Editing for a Series (Multi-Camera Production) | Andy Ackerman | "The Days Of Wine And Neuroses" | Nominated |
| 1991 | Outstanding Editing for a Series (Multi-Camera Production) | Sheila Amos | "Rat Girl" | Nominated |
| 1991 | Outstanding Sound Mixing for a Comedy Series or a Special | Sam Black, Robert Crosby, Jr., Robert Douglass, Thomas J. Huth | "The Days Of Wine And Neuroses" | Nominated |
| 1992 | Outstanding Individual Achievement in Editing for a Series (Multi-Camera Production) | Robert Bramwell, Peter J. Chakos | "An Old Fashioned Wedding" | Nominated |
| 1992 | Outstanding Individual Achievement in Sound Mixing for a Comedy Series or a Special | Sam Black, Robert Crosby, Jr., Robert Douglass, Thomas J. Huth | "Bar Wars IV: This Time it's for Real" | Nominated |
| 1993 | Outstanding Editing for a Series - Multi-Camera Production | Robert Bramwell | "One for the Road" | Won |

== Golden Globe Awards ==
| Year | Category | Nominee(s) | Result |
|---|---|---|---|
| 1983 | Best Performance by an Actress in a Supporting Role in a Series, Mini-Series or Motion Picture Made for Television | Shelley Long | Won |
| 1983 | Best Television Series – Comedy or Musical | | Nominated |
| 1984 | Best Television Series – Comedy or Musical | | Nominated |
| 1984 | Best Performance by an Actress in a Television Series – Comedy or Musical | Shelley Long | Nominated |
| 1984 | Best Performance by an Actor in a Television Series – Comedy or Musical | Ted Danson | Nominated |
| 1985 | Best Performance by an Actress in a Television Series – Comedy or Musical | Shelley Long | Won |
| 1985 | Best Television Series – Comedy or Musical | | Nominated |
| 1985 | Best Performance by an Actor in a Television Series – Comedy or Musical | Ted Danson | Nominated |
| 1985 | Best Performance by an Actress in a Supporting Role in a Series, Mini-Series or Motion Picture Made for Television | Rhea Perlman | Nominated |
| 1986 | Best Performance by an Actor in a Television Series – Comedy or Musical | Ted Danson | Nominated |
| 1987 | Best Television Series – Comedy or Musical | | Nominated |
| 1987 | Best Performance by an Actor in a Television Series – Comedy or Musical | Ted Danson | Nominated |
| 1987 | Best Performance by an Actress in a Supporting Role in a Series, Mini-Series or Motion Picture Made for Television | Rhea Perlman | Nominated |
| 1988 | Best Television Series – Comedy or Musical | | Nominated |
| 1988 | Best Performance by an Actress in a Supporting Role in a Series, Mini-Series or Motion Picture Made for Television | Rhea Perlman | Nominated |
| 1989 | Best Television Series – Comedy or Musical | | Nominated |
| 1989 | Best Performance by an Actor in a Television Series – Comedy or Musical | Ted Danson | Nominated |
| 1989 | Best Performance by an Actress in a Supporting Role in a Series, Mini-Series or Motion Picture Made for Television | Rhea Perlman | Nominated |
| 1990 | Best Performance by an Actor in a Television Series – Comedy or Musical | Ted Danson | Won |
| 1990 | Best Television Series – Comedy or Musical | | Nominated |
| 1990 | Best Performance by an Actress in a Television Series – Comedy or Musical | Kirstie Alley | Nominated |
| 1990 | Best Performance by an Actress in a Supporting Role in a Series, Mini-Series or Motion Picture Made for Television | Rhea Perlman | Nominated |
| 1991 | Best Television Series – Comedy or Musical | | Won |
| 1991 | Best Performance by an Actress in a Television Series – Comedy or Musical | Kirstie Alley | Won |
| 1991 | Best Performance by an Actor in a Television Series – Comedy or Musical | Ted Danson | Won |
| 1992 | Best Television Series – Comedy or Musical | | Nominated |
| 1992 | Best Performance by an Actress in a Television Series – Comedy or Musical | Kirstie Alley | Nominated |
| 1992 | Best Performance by an Actor in a Television Series – Comedy or Musical | Ted Danson | Nominated |
| 1992 | Best Performance by an Actress in a Supporting Role in a Series, Mini-Series or Motion Picture Made for Television | Rhea Perlman | Nominated |
| 1993 | Best Television Series – Comedy or Musical | | Nominated |
| 1993 | Best Performance by an Actress in a Television Series – Comedy or Musical | Kirstie Alley | Nominated |
| 1993 | Best Performance by an Actor in a Television Series – Comedy or Musical | Ted Danson | Nominated |
