= The Tortellis =

1987 American television sitcom

- Series premiere print advertisement
- Genre: Sitcom
- Created by: Ken Estin; Glen Charles; Les Charles; James Burrows
- Based on: Characters by Ken Estin; Sam Simon
- Starring: Dan Hedaya; Jean Kasem; Timothy Williams; Mandy Ingber; Aaron Moffatt; Carlene Watkins
- Composer: Perry Botkin Jr.
- Country of origin: United States
- Original language: English
- No. of seasons: 1
- No. of episodes: 13

Production
- Executive producers: James Burrows; Glen Charles; Les Charles
- Producer: Stu Kreisman
- Editor: Robert Bramwell
- Camera setup: Multi-camera
- Running time: 30 minutes
- Production companies: Charles/Burrows/Charles Company; Paramount Television

Original release
- Network: NBC
- Release: January 22 – May 12, 1987

Related
- Cheers

The Tortellis is an American television sitcom and the first spin-off of the sitcom Cheers, starring Dan Hedaya and Jean Kasem. It was produced by Charles/Burrows/Charles Company and Paramount Television and aired on NBC from January 22 to May 12, 1987.

== Synopsis ==
Hedaya and Kasem had appeared on Cheers on several occasions as Nick and Loretta Tortelli, who were (respectively) Carla Tortelli's loutish ex-husband and his cheerful, bubble-headed new trophy wife. The series co-stars Timothy Williams as Anthony Tortelli, Nick and Carla's teenage son, and Mandy Ingber as Annie Tortelli, Anthony's young bride, reprising their roles from Cheers.

At the beginning of the series, Loretta leaves Nick and moves to Las Vegas to live with her sensible, divorced sister Charlotte (played by Carlene Watkins), and Charlotte's young son Mark (Aaron Moffat). The series follows Nick as he moves to Las Vegas to try to reconcile with Loretta, vowing to change his sleazy, conniving ways in the process. Nick and Loretta tentatively get back together, and Nick sets up a TV repair business and tries to reform—not always successfully. Anthony and Annie follow Nick to Las Vegas, and all six characters live in the same house.

After the series was canceled, all four Tortelli characters returned to Cheers, where it was revealed that Nick's TV repair business in Las Vegas went under, but also that Nick and Loretta were still together (albeit somewhat shakily) and were still living in Las Vegas.

The characters of Charlotte and Mark Cooper were never seen or even referred to on any episode of Cheers, either before or after The Tortellis' run.

== Cast ==
- Dan Hedaya as Nick Tortelli
- Jean Kasem as Loretta Tortelli
- Timothy Williams as Anthony Tortelli
- Mandy Ingber as Annie Tortelli
- Aaron Moffatt as Mark Cooper
- Carlene Watkins as Charlotte Cooper

=== Guest stars ===
- Rhea Perlman appeared as her Cheers character Carla in the pilot, in a dream sequence.
- George Wendt (Norm Peterson) and John Ratzenberger (Cliff Clavin) appeared in episode 3, paying a visit to Las Vegas and meeting up with Nick.
- Mitchell Laurance was seen in a recurring role as Pete Bruno, Charlotte's untrustworthy boyfriend.

== Reception and cancellation ==
The Tortellis drew sharp criticism for its stereotypical depiction of Italian Americans. Television writer Bill Kelley wrote: "The Italian-American Anti-Defamation League should be about as enchanted with Nick Tortelli as it was with The Untouchables."

The series drew low ratings, ranking 50th out of 79 series with an average rating/share of 13.3/20. As a result, NBC canceled The Tortellis after 13 episodes. The next attempts at a Cheers spin-off, Wings and Frasier, were considerably more successful, running for eight and 11 seasons, respectively.

== Episodes ==
No.	Title	Directed by	Written by	Original release date
1	"Pilot"	James Burrows	Ken Estin	January 22, 1987
Nick Tortelli follows his wife Loretta to Las Vegas, hoping to get a second chance with her.
2	"An Affair to Remember"	Greg Antonacci	Jake Weinberger & Mike Weinberger	January 28, 1987
Charlotte tries to make her boyfriend jealous after learning he's seeing another woman.
3	"Frankie Comes to Dinner"	Michael Zinberg	Jeff Abugov	February 4, 1987
When Cliff and Norm come to Vegas, Nick tells them that Frank Sinatra is coming to dinner.
4	"Svengali"	Jack Shea	Kimberly Hill	February 11, 1987
Loretta finally gets a job after finding a new manager, leading Nick to spring into action.
5	"The Ad Game"	Jack Shea	Cheri Eichen & Bill Steinkellner	February 18, 1987
A woman challenges Nick to fulfill his guarantee of fixing a TV in a day or eating a bug.
6	"Viva Las Vegas"	Greg Antonacci	Stuart Silverman	February 25, 1987
An Elvis impersonator, whom Nick takes under his wing, takes a shine to Charlotte.
7	"Coochie, Coochie"	Charlotte Brown	Anne Convy	March 18, 1987
Charo summons Nick to her dressing room for a repair, but when the job takes longer than it should, Loretta gets jealous and decides to confront her.
8	"Man of the Year"	Michael Zinberg	Tom Moore & Phil Kellard	March 25, 1987
Nick receives a "Man of the Year" when he offers a year of free TV repair service in order to raise money for charity.
9	"The Good Life"	Michael Zinberg	Jeff Abugov	April 1, 1987
Nick pretends to be a wealthy businessman just so his family can spend a night in a luxurious hotel.
10	"Father Knows Best"	Charlotte Brown	Jake Weinberger & Mike Weinberger	April 21, 1987
Nick decides to teach Anthony how to be a man when he sees how his son relates to Annie.
11	"The Customer's Always Right"	Charlotte Brown	Chris Cluess & Stu Kreisman	April 28, 1987
After fixing a TV for a condescending customer, Nick takes him to court when the man's check bounces.
12	"Innocent as Charged"	Jack Shea	Timothy Williams & Ray Morton	May 5, 1987
Nick and Anthony get in trouble with their wives, who catch them with scantily-clad women by the pool.
13	"His Girl Friday"	Michael Zinberg	Ken Levine & David Isaacs	May 12, 1987
Nick regrets hiring a secretary who turns out to be a tyrant.
