= Cheers season 1 =

Season of television series

Cheers
- Season 1
- Region 1 DVD edition
- Showrunner: Glen and Les Charles
- Starring: Ted Danson; Shelley Long; Nicholas Colasanto; Rhea Perlman; George Wendt
- No. of episodes: 22

Release
- Original network: NBC
- Original release: September 30, 1982 – March 31, 1983

Season chronology
- Next → Season 2

The first season of the American television sitcom Cheers aired on NBC from September 30, 1982, to March 31, 1983. The show was created and produced by director James Burrows and writers Glen and Les Charles, who previously worked on Taxi, another sitcom. Cheers was produced by Charles Burrows Charles Productions in association with Paramount Television. The concept and production design of the show were inspired by a public house in Boston, the Bull & Finch, which is now called Cheers Beacon Hill.

When it was first broadcast, critics praised the series as intelligent, sophisticated, cleverly written, well-cast, and well-timed. However, the Nielsen ratings for its original runs were very low. Typically, low ratings result in a show's cancellation, but before the season finale aired, the network renewed it for another season. Reruns of season 1 scored higher ratings than its first airing and the series earned award recognitions, including five Emmy Award wins in 1983. In later years, this season has still elicited positive reviews and is currently available on DVD.

== Cast and characters ==
This season introduces six characters:

- Sam Malone (Ted Danson)—a bartender, bar owner, and retired baseball player. Before the series premiered, his baseball career took a toll due to his alcoholism. He quit drinking three years prior to the series start, but retained ownership of Cheers, which he had bought when he was still drinking.
- Diane Chambers (Shelley Long)—a college-educated, sophisticated academic who is jilted by her fiancé and left without money or a job. Diane is hired by Sam as a waitress. She proves to be pretentious, annoys customers with her long-winded speeches, and becomes the butt of their jokes.
- Carla Tortelli (Rhea Perlman)—a hard-working, "wisecracking, cynical waitress". Carla is a divorced mother of her ex-husband Nick's four children and then becomes pregnant with his fifth child. Diane and Carla do not get along and often insult each other.
- Ernie "Coach" Pantusso (Nicholas Colasanto)—an aging befuddled, "gravelly voiced" retired coach and co-bartender. Coach is vulnerable to other people's exploits, which puts the bar at stake. Coach and Sam take care of each other as father and son figures whenever help is needed. Nevertheless, he listens to people's problems and solves them with advice and analysis.
- Norm Peterson (George Wendt)—a semi-employed accountant and bar regular. Whenever Norm enters the bar, people yell out his name, "Norm!" Diane, however, always calls him by his full first name, "Norman", after everyone has already said "Norm!"
- Cliff Clavin (John Ratzenberger)—a postal worker and bar regular. Cliff is often present in the bar and his words confuse or irritate other people. (The actor Ratzenberger in this season was never credited in the opening title sequence but in ending credits of almost every episode. He would be billed in the opening sequence in subsequent seasons.)

== Episodes ==
Original air dates of episodes are not premiere dates for some areas of the United States. In those areas, episodes may have been broadcast at later dates, but these dates are not included in this article. This series' original time slot was 9:00pm (Eastern)/8:00pm (Central). In January 1983, it was moved to 9:30pm ET/8:30pm CT due to lineup changes.

No.	Title	Directed by	Written by	Original release date	Rating/share/rank (households)
1	"Give Me a Ring Sometime"	James Burrows	Les Charles	September 30, 1982	9.6 / 15 / #60
Boston University student Diane and her fiancé, professor Sumner Sloane (Michael McGuire), plan to marry in Barbados. When he receives a telephone call from his ex-wife at the bar, Sumner returns to her and leaves an unsuspecting Diane behind. When she tries to change their flight reservations, Diane learns that Sumner and his ex-wife have already used the reservations. Owner and bartender Sam offers Diane a job as a waitress, which she initially refuses, but reluctantly accepts when she finds she can repeat verbatim a lengthy order from one table.
2	"Sam's Women"	James Burrows	Earl Pomerantz	October 7, 1982	14.7 / 22 / #49
Diane confronts Sam for his serial dating of attractive yet unintelligent women. To prove he can date an intelligent woman, Sam uses his ex-wife as a dating charade, which becomes foiled when Diane sees that their orchestra program is from two years ago. Humiliated, Sam blames Diane for making him discontent with his womanizing ways, and assures her that he will not give up on winning an intelligent woman. A former customer, Leo (Donnelly Rhodes), comes to the bar seeking advice from Gus, the former owner. When Leo hears that Gus is dead, he reluctantly turns to Coach for help. Leo's son Ron has a fiancé Rick, an African-American man. Coach advises Leo to simply abandon Ron if he is "unhappy about it". However, Leo mistakes Coach's advice for deliberate reverse-psychology and leaves the bar as an accepting father. According to Bjorklund's book about the series, Gus from the 11th season episode, "The Last Picture Show" (1993), may not be the deceased former owner of the same name. In some syndicated prints, mention of Sam's past marriage is omitted.
3	"The Tortelli Tort"	James Burrows	Tom Reeder	October 14, 1982	11.1 / 17 / #63
Carla attacks Big Eddie (Ron Karabatsos) for insulting the Boston Red Sox, including Sam. Confronted with a lawsuit threatening either Carla's losing her job or Sam's losing the bar, Carla tries to placate the issue by seeing an anger management counselor. When Big Eddie next encounters Carla in the bar, he is both frustrated and impressed by her self-control, and ultimately drops the lawsuit against Sam and Cheers. A tough patron who plays for the Boston Bruins has overheard Eddie's insulting comments about his sports team, and escorts Eddie from the bar—apparently to beat up Big Eddie, much to everybody's pleasure. However, Carla still apparently carries anger when she rudely throws the beer mug to a customer from the pool table room. Jon Miller, a then-announcer for the Boston Red Sox, provides the play-by-play of the game on the television in the opening scene.
4	"Sam at Eleven"	James Burrows	Glen Charles & Les Charles	October 21, 1982	11.1 / 17 / #62
Sportscaster Dave Richards (Fred Dryer) wants to interview Sam because no better-known celebrities are available. Later, Dave shatters Sam's second bid for fame by leaving in the middle of the interview for a now-available celebrity. In the billiard room, Diane tries to convince Sam to take pride in his past but enjoy the present, which backfires when Sam tries to kiss Diane. Diane flips him onto the pool table, revealing her unexpected knowledge of judo. To cheer up Sam, she expresses further interest in Sam's baseball reminiscences. A con artist, Harry "the Hat" Gittes (Harry Anderson), makes his first appearance, conning people throughout the episode. Though credited, John Ratzenberger (as Cliff) does not appear in this episode. This is one of two Cheers episodes in which Cliff does not appear—the other is "50–50 Carla."
5	"Coach's Daughter"	James Burrows	Ken Estin	October 28, 1982	11.0 / 17 / #69
Coach's daughter Lisa (Allyce Beasley) arrives with her fiancé Roy (Philip Charles MacKenzie), who is rude and obnoxious. Coach tries to keep silent about his disapproval to make her happy, but Roy continues to insult others. Then Coach tells Lisa that she is too good for the likes of Roy. Lisa reluctantly agrees with her father and says that she will marry Roy only because she is ashamed of her own beauty, which resembles her mother's. However, Coach tells Lisa that she is more beautiful every day, like her mother. Feeling more self-confident, Lisa tells Roy off and ends their relationship and prepares to celebrate her freedom with her father. Diane draws sketches of people, but her efforts show no resemblance to their subjects.
6	"Any Friend of Diane's"	James Burrows	Ken Levine & David Isaacs	November 4, 1982	12.4 / 18 / #62
Diane's university friend Rebecca Prout (Julia Duffy) tells her that she has dumped her fiancé Elliott, who has been unfaithful to her. In desperation, Rebecca wants to have sex with Sam. Diane tries to stop them but is unsuccessful, and Sam and Rebecca leave the bar. Later, Sam returns and tells Diane that nothing happened, and that he found Rebecca "boring, depressing, [and] long-winded," much to Diane's relief. However, Rebecca returns in tears and tells Diane that Sam abandoned and neglected her, which angers Diane. In response, Diane and Sam pretend to be in a relationship, which boosts Rebecca's self-esteem over the rejection. In an attempt to impress one of his clients (Macon McCalman), Norm initially limits himself to one beer to avoid being seen as a barfly. However, his boss wants to drink more. Coach reluctantly lets Norm order a pitcher full of beer instead.
7	"Friends, Romans, Accountants"	James Burrows	Ken Levine & David Isaacs	November 11, 1982	13.6 / 21 / #49
Accountant Norm Peterson chooses a toga theme, suggested by Diane, and Cheers for the annual office party as an effort to impress his boss Herbert Sawyer (James Read). When Norm arrives wearing a toga, the party turns out to be moribund and lifeless, leaving Norm humiliated, disappointed, and the only person wearing a toga. Desperate, Norm begs Diane to be his boss's date for the evening, but she refuses until Sawyer turns out to be attractive. In the billiard room, Sawyer tries to seduce Diane. When she rejects his advances, Herbert begins attempting to sexually assault her. Norm sees Sawyer attacking Diane and saves her by grabbing Sawyer, who fires Norm. Norm is unhappy about losing his job, but then everyone finds out that Norm stood up to Herbert, causing everyone to celebrate.
8	"Truce or Consequences"	James Burrows	Ken Levine & David Isaacs	November 18, 1982	11.9 / 18 / #63
Sam intervenes in a conflict between Diane and Carla, who cannot stand each other. He warns them about losing their jobs and orders them to patch things up. After Sam leaves the bar, Carla confesses to Diane that Gino, one of her children, is Sam's child, and commands Diane to keep this a secret. The next day, Diane inadvertently reveals Carla's secret to Coach. Then Coach tells her that Sam and Carla have only known each other for five years and Gino is seven and a half, exposing Carla's confession to be a lie. When another conflict between the two waitresses ensues, Sam drags them into the office to settle the matter. When they tell Sam the whole situation, and Carla shows a picture of Gino, all of them burst into laughter. Carla and Diane make a truce with a handshake.
9	"Coach Returns to Action"	James Burrows	Earl Pomerantz	November 25, 1982	10.0 / 18 / #69
The weather in Boston is very cold. Coach has a crush on his new neighbor Nina (Murphy Cross), who comes into the bar because the heater in her apartment is not working, but Coach is too shy to ask her out. When Coach has almost given up asking Nina out, Diane and Carla cheer him up by telling him that, even old in age, he is still attractive to woman. As she is about to leave, Coach finally asks Nina out, but Nina kindly rejects his offer. Coach purposely falls down the stairs and feigns injury, and Nina takes him back to her apartment to nurse him back to health. An unhappy tour guide (Bill Wiley) repeatedly brings tourists into the bar until Sam kicks him out.
10	"Endless Slumper"	James Burrows	Sam Simon	December 2, 1982	12.7 / 19 / #57
After Sam gives a struggling baseball player Rick (Christopher McDonald) his lucky bottle cap to improve Rick's struggling baseball career, Sam experiences bad luck as his bartending skills deteriorate. Sam admits to Diane that the cap prevents him from relapsing into alcoholism, as it was from the last beer he ever drank. Sam calls Rick, who tells Sam that he lost the bottle cap a week ago in Kansas City. Shocked, Sam pours beer into a mug and then resists drinking it, and claims the new bottle cap as his lucky charm.
11	"One for the Book"	James Burrows	Katherine Green	December 9, 1982	12.4 / 19 / #60
"Shy, serious-minded" young man Kevin (Boyd Bodwell), planning to enter a monastery, comes to the bar for a one-time visit. Kevin mistakes Diane's positive compliments about his physique as flirtation and tries to kiss her, upsetting Diane. Feeling bad about it, Kevin figures that he is unfit for the monastery and would rather go decadent. Kevin puts a coin in the coin-operated piano that has not worked for twenty years. When it "miraculously" works, he believes that he has healed the piano and will become a monk. After Kevin leaves, Coach reveals that he had the piano fixed "a couple days ago". An elderly World War I veteran Buzz (Ian Wolfe) enters the bar for another reunion with his former troops. However, no others arrive, devastating him. Nevertheless, all employees and Norm sing 'Mademoiselle from Armentières' to cheer him up. Diane writes down quotes from bar customers that appeal to her. Sam learns that she was uninspired by his quotes and then omitted them from her "stupid, pretentious book". Frustrated, he angrily says, "What does a stuffed shirt know about blue-collar poetry?", which Diane happily writes down.
12	"The Spy Who Came In for a Cold One"	James Burrows	David Lloyd	December 16, 1982	12.1 / 18 / #64
Stranger "Eric Finch" (Ellis Rabb) enters the bar and claims to be a spy, impressing barflies. When Diane sees through his stories, he shamefully admits that he is really just a boring man who writes poetry. Diane is impressed with his poetry until Coach recites a poem that Eric simultaneously recites, which turns out to be from another author, destroying Diane's faith in him. Eric then claims to be millionaire "Thomas Hilliard III", who wants to buy the bar from Sam with a $2 million check. Angry and betrayed, Diane tears up the check and expresses no regret until a chauffeur enters and calls the man "Mr. Hilliard". To cheer her up, Sam assures Diane that he will never sell the bar.
13	"Now Pitching, Sam Malone"	James Burrows	Ken Levine & David Isaacs	January 6, 1983	14.8 / 22 / #56
Sam flirts with Lana (Barbara Babcock), an advertising agent, and then becomes her client. As a result, Sam appears in a beer commercial, but he is not happy about the arrangement. Sam confesses to Diane about the affair, so she tries to help figure out what to do. When Coach threatens to kick Sam's butt, Sam reluctantly ends his relationship with Lana and his contract with her.
14	"Let Me Count the Ways"	James Burrows	Heide Perlman	January 13, 1983	12.9 / 20 / #61
Diane's cat Elizabeth Barrett Browning has recently died, and no one is consoling her for grieving over the pet. When she breaks down in tears, Sam takes Diane into the office to calm her down and orders her to discuss the cat. Diane relates how she had been close to Elizabeth; the pair enjoyed each other's mutual support, especially when Diane's parents separated. Sam and Diane almost embrace until Diane interrupts and accuses him of taking advantage of her grief for sex. They argue and insult each other, and decide not to hug each other again in order to avoid sexual tension. Coach and Sam win their secret bet on the Boston Celtics losing the basketball game—based on Marshall Lipton's (Mark King) book of cybernetics.
15	"Father Knows Last"	James Burrows	Heide Perlman	January 20, 1983	14.9 / 22 / #46
Carla is pregnant with a fifth child and tells nerdy MIT teacher Marshall that he is the father. When Marshall tells Diane that he and Carla dated only once, Diane suspects Carla is lying and confronts her. Carla admits that the child's father is her ex-husband Nick and refuses to tell Marshall this. Diane taunts Carla by repeatedly making "boom-boom" sounds from The Tell-Tale Heart, a short story by Edgar Allan Poe. Still bothered by Diane's antics, Carla tells Marshall the truth, which ends his relationship with her. The Cheers gang volunteers to help Carla support the baby. Rhea Perlman was pregnant while this season was filmed.
16	"The Boys in the Bar"	James Burrows	Ken Levine & David Isaacs	January 27, 1983	14.9 / 22 / #41
Sam supports the coming out of his former baseball teammate (Alan Autry), to the annoyance of the bar's patrons, including Norm, who fear that Cheers will become a gay bar. The next day, Diane reveals that "there are two gay men" in this bar. The customers suspect that three male newcomers are gay and want them to leave the bar. However, when three men congratulate Sam for his support the day before, Sam decides not to eject them and to avoid turning Cheers into a discriminative place. Norm and other patrons announce last call for drinks at 7:00pm and escort the men from the bar. Diane reveals the three men are not gay, and that two gay men are still inside. The two men in question kiss Norm on his cheeks.
17	"Diane's Perfect Date"	James Burrows	David Lloyd	February 10, 1983	13.3 / 18 / #44
Diane arranges a blind date for Sam with an intellectual woman. Sam assumes that Diane is his "date" and does not arrange one for Diane. Diane introduces Sam to Gretchen (Gretchen Corbett). Panicked, Sam randomly chooses Andy (Derek McGrath), an ex-convict. During their dates, Andy stuns others with his murderous behavior, frightening Gretchen away. When their dates leave, Sam admits his actions and clears up the misunderstandings and tells Diane that she may be a perfect match for him. Diane infuriates Sam by teasing him for admitting his romantic feelings for her. The bar patrons debate the relationship. Cheers was postponed on Thursday, February 3, 1983, because of television miniseries Shogun.
18	"No Contest"	James Burrows	Heide Perlman	February 17, 1983	15.9 / 24 / #49
Diane finds out that without her knowledge, Sam has registered her into the 45th Annual Miss Boston Barmaid contest, a beauty pageant representing bar waitresses of Boston, which Diane considers "degrading to women". While going to decline her registration, she discovers that reporters and interviewers will be present so continues with the contest. While she is preparing to denounce the contest, Diane becomes overwhelmingly excited by winning two tickets to Bermuda and other prizes. When Sam promises to be a 'perfect gentleman', Diane declines to take him to Bermuda.
19	"Pick a Con... Any Con"	James Burrows	David Angell	February 24, 1983	13.1 / 20 / #58
Coach loses $8,000 savings to George Wheeler (Reid Shelton) in rounds of gin rummy, a card game. Sam bails out con artist Harry the Hat from jail and fronts him $5,000 to get the money back from George. That night, George plays poker with Harry and with others, including Sam. George wins every round when his opponents, including Harry, fold. Coach and Sam discover that, in a recent round, Harry's four 3s in his hand (four of a kind) would have beaten George's straight hand. George and Harry confess that they have been teaming together to cheat the bar patrons the whole night. George threatens to report them to the police for gambling if they try anything. However, Coach begs for another round with Harry and George alone. At the final round, Coach rubs his nose as a sign that George could beat Harry with three Queens. Harry wins with four 3s and exits the bar. When George leaves, Harry re-enters from the back room and admits that he teamed up with Coach to retrieve the $8,000 by cheating George.
20	"Someone Single, Someone Blue"	James Burrows	David Angell	March 3, 1983	14.7 / 22 / #43
Diane's mother Helen (Glynis Johns) is about to lose her wealth unless, under her father's will, Diane marries by the following day. Diane and her mother pick Sam to be Diane's groom, as suggested by Carla, and Sam reluctantly plays along. During the wedding in the bar, as justice of the peace Harrison Fiedler (Dean Dittman) waxes on the virtues of marriage, Diane grows emotional, and becomes angered when Sam looks at another woman. Sam and Diane erupt into an argument, prompting Helen to halt the wedding. Although the fortune is gone, Helen's chauffeur Boggs (Duncan Ross) reveals he has been embezzling from the Chambers family for years. He then proposes to Helen, who accepts. Producers wanted Lucille Ball as Diane's mother, but she turned down the role.
21	"Showdown"	James Burrows	Glen Charles & Les Charles	March 24, 1983	13.6 / 21 / #51
22	"Showdown"	James Burrows	Glen Charles & Les Charles	March 31, 1983	14.7 / 23 / #36
Part 1: Sam's brother, Derek (an unseen character, voiced by George Ball), who exceeds Sam in success, education, talent, and looks, arrives to Boston with his private jet. Derek entertains bar patrons with his talents. He teaches Coach to speak Spanish for a coaching job in Venezuela and offers Norm a job. Derek and Diane begin dating, making Sam jealous. Part 2: Norm is fired from the job that Derek offered last week, the corporation having committed tax fraud. Coach loses the coaching job to someone else, putting the Spanish lessons to waste. Sam and Diane confess their feelings for each other putting Derek out of their picture. However, when Diane resists Sam's advances, Sam and Diane end up arguing, then spewing bad remarks about each other, and passionately kiss.

Specials

No.	Title	Directed by	Written by	Original release date
S01	"Super Bowl XVII Pregame segment"	James Burrows	Ken Levine & David Isaacs	January 30, 1983
A short sketch, running under three minutes. The gang is assembled at Cheers to watch the Super Bowl. While Diane mocks the game, they all meet sportscaster Pete Axthelm. Aired as part of 1983's Super Bowl pre-game show. Other NBC shows Remington Steele, Taxi, and The A-Team also produced sketches for that year's Super Bowl pre-game. This short sketch is not available on home video. Nicholas Colasanto does not appear in this sketch.
S02	"Uncle Sam Malone"	James Burrows	Ralph Phillips additional material: Brian H. Sato & Steven Amaya	TBA
Cliff is about to go on vacation to Tahiti, paid for by his investment in U.S. Savings Bonds. Sam, Cliff and Norm convince Diane, Carla, and Coach to also invest in bonds. "Uncle Sam Malone" is presented as a complete (if short) episode of Cheers, including opening theme and closing credits, and was produced by the United States Department of Treasury to promote sales of U.S. Savings Bonds. The abbreviated episode runs 13 minutes, and stars the whole main cast of Cheers, in character.

== Production ==
=== Conception, setting, and filming ===
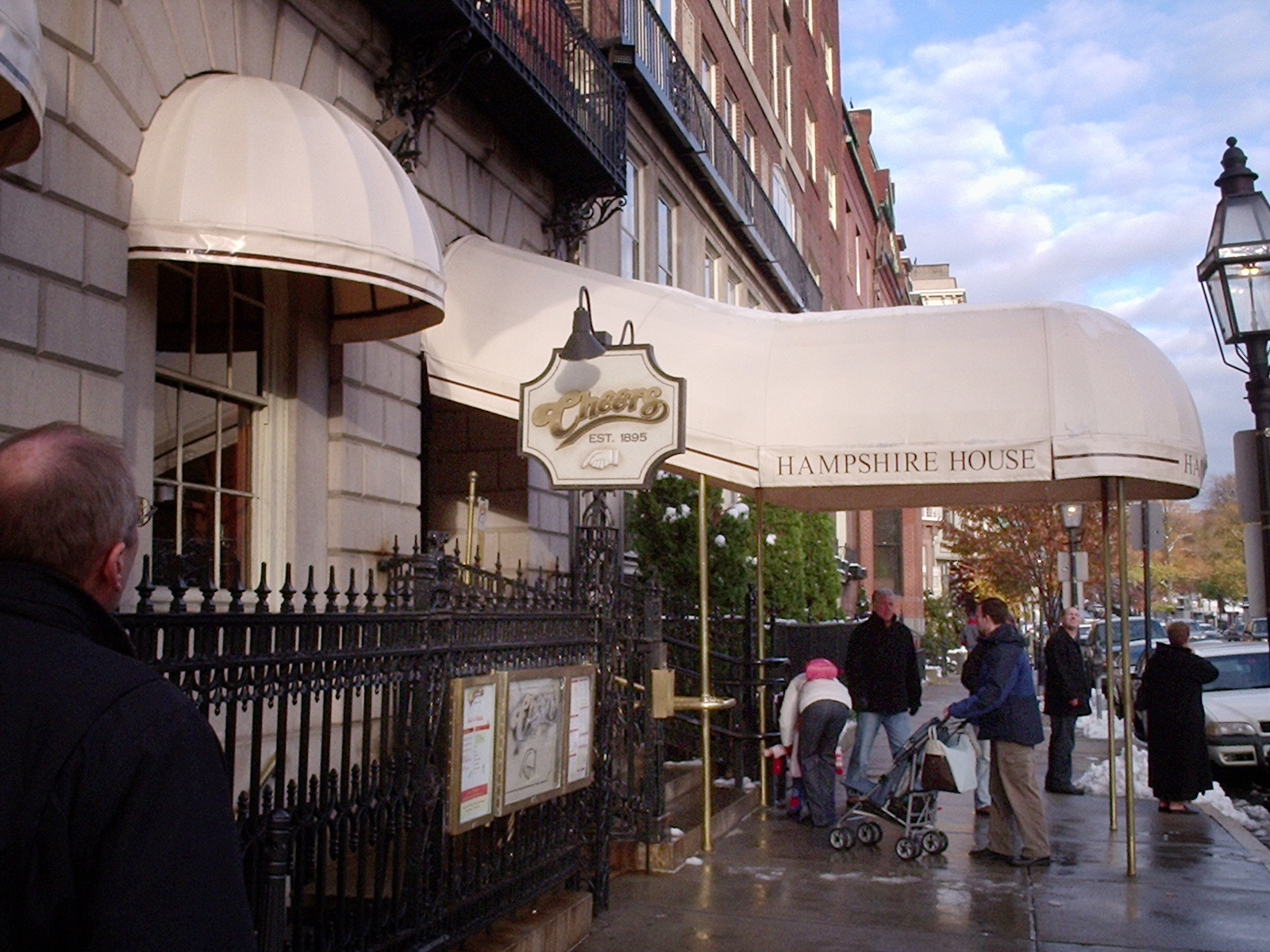
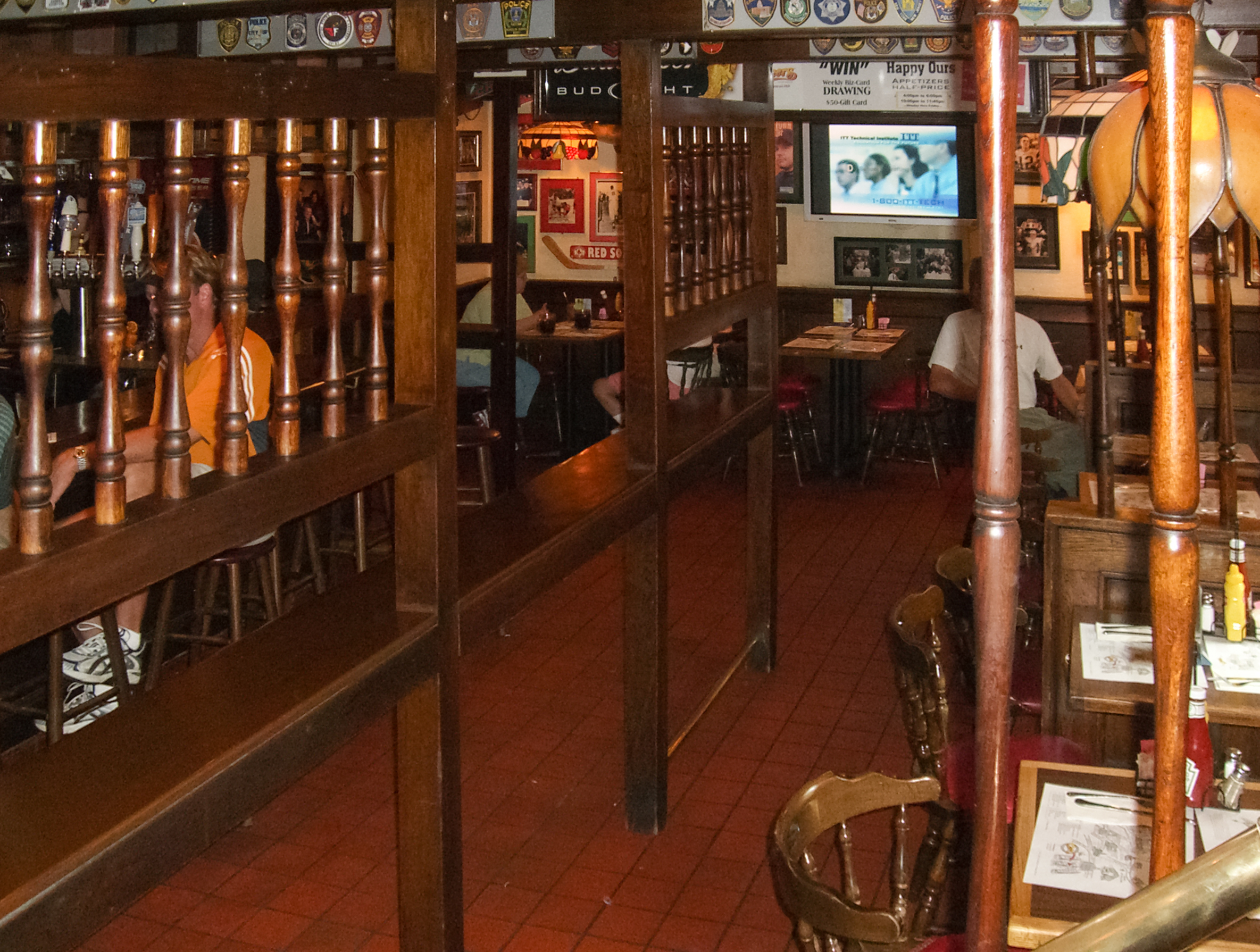
Exterior (left) and interior of the Bull & Finch Pub, now Cheers Beacon Hill, that inspired the show's bar stage set.

Director James Burrows observed that this series is intended to be about the bar, where anybody comes in for any reason, not just drinks. The show was originally set in a hotel, a setting inspired by Fawlty Towers, Burrows's favorite British sitcom. The producers narrowed the setting down to a hotel bar, but later evolved it into a neighborhood bar in Boston, according to Glen Charles, "because it was more cozy". The "athletic element" was added to the bar because the show's creators, Burrows and Charles brothers (Glen and Les) were sports fans.

The show's bar setting was inspired by the Bull & Finch Pub in Boston. It was not filmed in the pub, but on the Stage 25 lot of Paramount Studios with the set decoration of Cheers. The Bull & Finch Pub was later renamed Cheers Beacon Hill. The entire season is set exclusively in the bar, its office, the bathroom, and the billiard room; no locations outside the bar were used until Diane Chambers' apartment is seen in the second season.

Drinks and snacks in the show were neither alcoholic nor edible. The scotch was made from water, the beer was non-alcoholic and was made out of "less lingering ingredients" with salt to produce a foam, and the cheese puffs were not real. The bathroom did not have toilets and sinks. Canned laughter was not used on the show; live audience reactions were recorded on film. From episode 13, each episode was preceded with the announcement, "Cheers is filmed before a live studio audience", and this continued during the remainder of the show's run.

NBC praised the show when the network was given test experiments and ordered initial thirteen episodes to be produced. The series' Nielsen ratings were low during this season, and the network tried to attract more viewers to the series. One episode was experimentally shot on videotape to lower production costs, but the producers were not satisfied with the results and continued to shoot the show on film. NBC also produced a scripted Super Bowl sketch with sportscaster Pete Axthelm, which was broadcast during the Super Bowl pre-game segment on January 30, 1983, along with sketches for other NBC shows, including The A-Team. After efforts to improve the ratings failed, NBC approved production of nine more episodes, and renewed the series for the next season.

=== Casting and character development ===
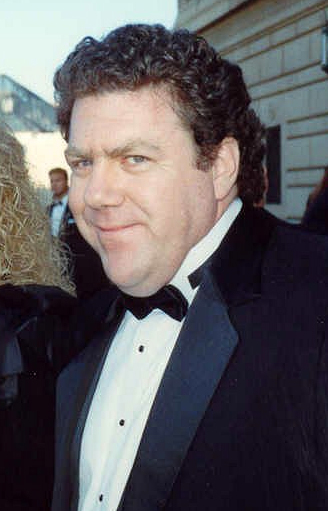
George Wendt

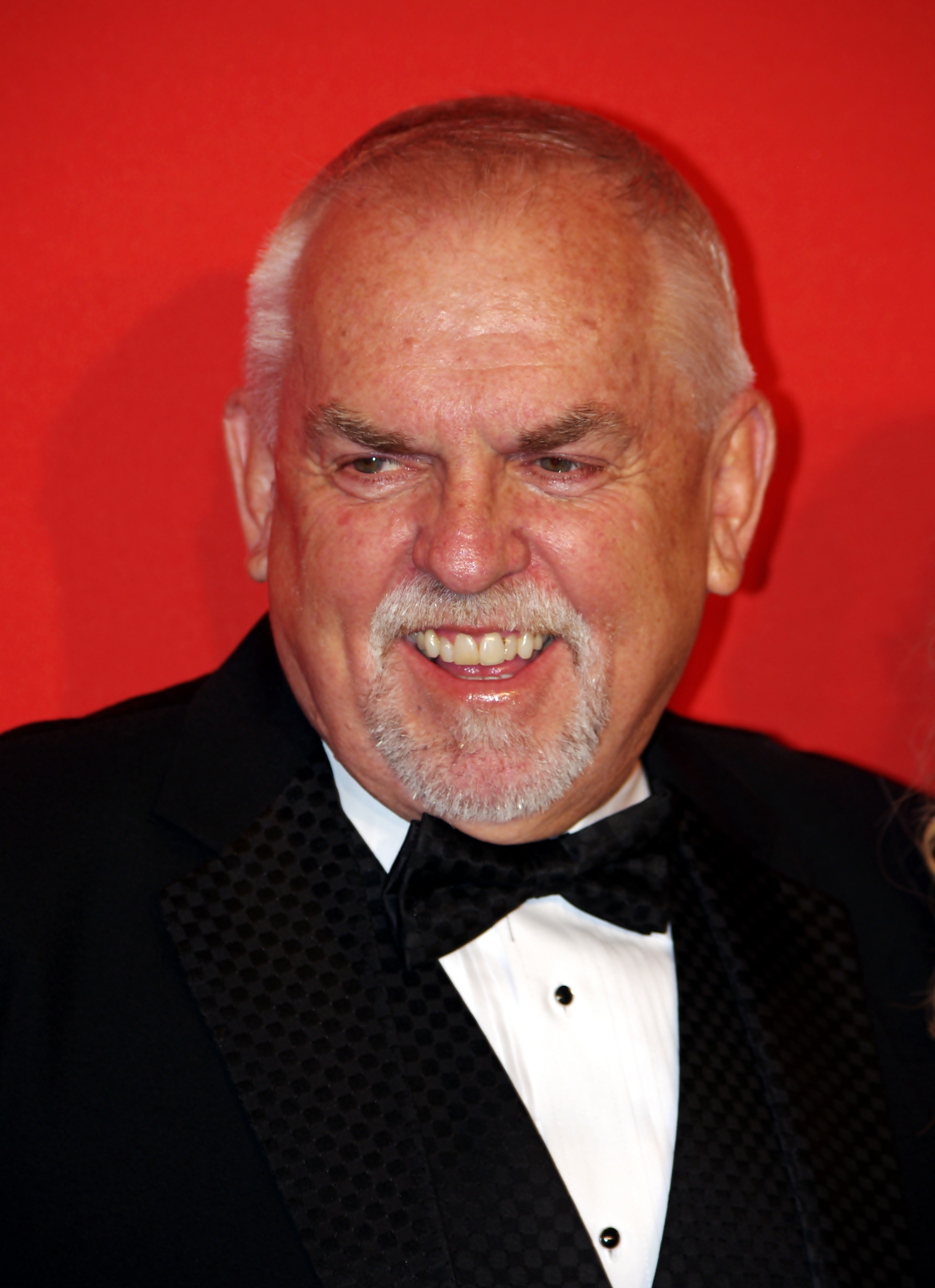
John Ratzenberger

Their respective roles (Norm Peterson and Cliff Clavin) were not envisioned until they auditioned for a minor, originally scripted role.

In the pilot episode's original script, there were only four principal characters: Sam Malone, Diane Chambers, Carla Tortelli, and Ernie "Coach" Pantusso. Norm Peterson and Cliff Clavin were absent from the original script. George Wendt and John Ratzenberger had auditioned for the role of George, a character who would have been included in the ending scene of the pilot episode with just one line, "Beer."

Wendt was cast as George, who evolved into Norm Peterson, while a know-it-all character Cliff Clavin was added at Ratzenberger's suggestion. Therefore, influenced by the casting of Wendt and Ratzenberger, the pilot script was revised before production began on the show. Wendt became part of the program's regular cast and continued until it ended. Ratzenberger was credited in almost every episode for his recurring appearances in season 1, and he became part of the regular cast in the following season.

Another character in the pilot script that was intended to be a regular was an elderly bar patron named "Mrs. Littlefield", who injected her conservative (and often racist) political opinions into the bar conversation. The character, played by Margaret Wheeler, was actually filmed appearing in the pilot, but producers decided the concept did not work and cut every single one of Mrs. Littlefield's lines from the final edit (and wrote her out of any subsequent episodes). Wheeler can still be seen as an extra in a few shots in the completed pilot ("Just look for a sweet white-haired little old lady who used to have lines", jokes Cheers producer Ken Levine), but was not credited.

Sam Malone was supposed to be an ex-wide receiver for the New England Patriots football team, but Danson's casting led the program's writers to change Sam's former sporting role into a former relief pitcher for the Boston Red Sox baseball team, as Danson's build did not resemble that of a typical football player. Nicholas Colasanto, director and actor who appeared in the 1980 film Raging Bull, was cast as Coach. About 1,000 actors who were not widely known were auditioned for these characters, and Stephen Kolzak was in charge of casting. According to Ted Danson, Perlman was the first actor to be hired for the show and was cast as Carla. Perlman had previously appeared in Taxi as the girlfriend (ex-girlfriend during the show's final season) of Louie de Palma, played by her husband Danny DeVito. Danson and Long were cast as a romantic duo.

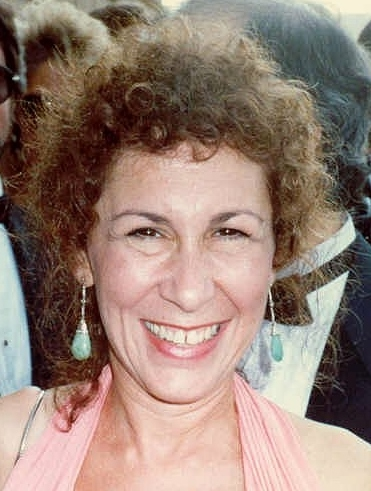
Rhea Perlman was first to be cast. Also, she was pregnant during the whole season, as well as her character Carla.

At the time the show was being filmed, Rhea Perlman was pregnant. She told the producers during filming of the third or fourth episode (produced or aired), and the episodes were filmed out of sequence to allow Perlman to hide her pregnancy with a tray until the episode "Father Knows Last", after which Perlman's pregnancy was assimilated into her character Carla Tortelli, who was pregnant with her ex-husband Nick's child for the rest of the season. Perlman's daughter Lucy was born on March 12, 1983.

=== Theme song ===
Before "Where Everybody Knows Your Name", written by Gary Portnoy and Judy Hart Angelo became the show's theme song, Cheers' producers rejected two of Portnoy's and Hart Angelo's previous songs. The songwriters had collaborated to provide music for Preppies an unsuccessful Broadway musical. When told they could not appropriate "People Like Us", Preppies's opening song, the pair wrote My Kind of People, intended to satirize "the lifestyle of old decadent old-money WASPs," but, to meet producers' demands, they rewrote the lyrics to be about "likeable losers" in a Boston bar. The show's producers rejected this song, as well as later songs that Portnoy and Angelo wrote. When Portnoy and Hart Angelo heard that NBC had commissioned thirteen episodes, they created "Where Everybody Knows Your Name", and rewrote the lyrics.

== Broadcasts ==
Cheers was an easy call. That is just so well done that we should be sent to jail for cancelling it.

— Grant Tinker, NBC chairman and chief executive

Cheers was first broadcast at 9:00pm (Eastern) / 8:00pm (Central) on Thursday during fall 1982, which later became NBC's Must See TV, which followed the hour-long musical series Fame and preceded another half-hour sitcom Taxi, and hour-long crime series Hill Street Blues. Cheers was scheduled against CBS's Simon & Simon and ABC's Too Close for Comfort. Because of poor Nielsen ratings, NBC changes its Thursday schedule. Critically acclaimed comedy Taxi moved to Saturdays; critically panned Gimme a Break! moved to Thursdays at 9pm ET/8pm CT and Cheers was moved to the 9:30pm ET/8:30pm CT slot, still competing against Simon & Simon and ABC's It Takes Two. Fame and Hill Street Blues remained in the same time slot. The overall performance of the season was 74th place out of "[ninety-nine] regularly scheduled shows".

Despite low ratings and unsuccessful attempts to improve them, NBC renewed Cheers for a second season, which it announced in March 1983. During mid-1983, reruns of the show's first season scored high ratings, most episodes reaching the top 20. "No Contest" was rerun on July 14, 1983, at 9:30pm ET/8:30pm CT and tied with Remington Steele in 12th place out of 65 programs in the ratings week of July 11, 1983. "Let Me Count the Ways" was rerun on May 26, 1983, and came 19th out of 63 programs with a 17.4 rating. "The Boys in the Bar" aired again on July 28, 1983, and scored a 12.8 rating and 23 share.

In Sydney, Australia, the first season aired on Sundays on Network Ten from November 1983 to April 8, 1984.

== Reception ==
During the first broadcast of its first season in 1982–1983, Cheers received positive reviews. Rick Sherwood called it "ever-charming". Montreal critic Mike Boone from The Gazette called it "unpredictable" and the supporting characters "splendid". Fred Rothenberg of the Associated Press called it the "funniest, most adult comedy on TV".

Later reviews were more positive. Jason Bovberg from DVD Talk praised season 1's writing quality above its "odd assortment of [characters]" and gave its content four and a half stars out of five. Steve Butts from IGN called this season "some of the best comedy writing and acting seen on television", praised the cast's performances, and gave it nine out of ten points. Another IGN critic Cliff Wheatley called the pilot "Give Me a Ring Sometime" the ninth best Cheers episode and another episode "Truth or Consequences" fifth. Stephen Tropiano from PopMatters called it "fresh and very funny", even for a very old show, but said that some situations seem "forced", especially for customers with no connections to main characters. He also wrote that the show has "witty dialogue, talented ensemble, and a premise reminiscent of 1930s screwball comedies", which compared with the most popular sitcoms of the 1970s—Three’s Company, Laverne and Shirley, and The Love Boat—"Cheers was a welcome change of pace.".

Michael Speier from Variety magazine called it "clever and touching" with "fresh" stories and praised chemistry between Ted Danson and Shelley Long. Jonathan Boudreaux from the website TVDVDReviews.com wrote, "[w]hile the episodes are often outrageously funny, the show's humor is character-based. The laughs arrive from the personalities and foibles of the group rather than from wacky situations." He also wrote, "Cheers is probably one of the best TV series of all time." Elizabeth Skipper from DVD Verdict rated the story 90 percent and acting 95 percent and wrote, "[t]here's nothing terribly unique about the series; it's ... fueled by the sexual tension between the two leads and fanned by a well-rounded supporting cast, a portrayal of the attempts of a downtown boy to win over an uptown girl—it's all been done before." Matt Brighton from Blu-ray Authority called the season's writing and directing "clever" and was "impressed at how this show has stood the test of time." TV Guide called "The Tortelli Tort" a "classic episode".

== Accolades ==
We could have no better relationship with a network.

— Les Charles at the 1983 Emmy Awards

The first season of Cheers received thirteen nominations for the Primetime Emmy Awards in 1983. It won five Emmy Awards, including an Outstanding Comedy Series. All the main cast except George Wendt, and John Ratzenberger, who was not part of the main cast, were nominated for, respectively, their own leading and supporting roles. Shelley Long won the award for Outstanding Lead Actress in a Comedy Series. Glen and Les Charles won an Outstanding Writing in a Comedy Series award for the pilot episode "Give Me a Ring Sometime". Episodes "The Boys in the Bar" and "Diane's Perfect Date" were nominated for the same category. James Castle and Bruce Bryant won an Outstanding Individual Achievement of Graphic Design and Title Sequences for "Showdown, Part One". James Burrows won an Outstanding Directing for a Comedy Series award for "Showdown, Part Two". The program's theme song, "Where Everybody Knows Your Name", was nominated for an Outstanding Achievement in Music and Lyrics award, but did not win.

The Television Critics Association voted Cheers the Best New Series of 1982–1983. The episodes "Give Me a Ring Sometime" and "The Boys in the Bar" won the Episodic Comedy category in the 36th Annual Writers Guild of America Awards in 1984. "The Spy Who Came In for a Cold One", and "Let Me Count the Ways" were nominated for the same award. James Burrows won the Comedy Series category of the 36th Annual Directors Guild of America Award (DGA) for "Showdown, Part Two" in 1984; he was DGA-nominated for "Sam at Eleven" but did not win in 1983.

On Saturday, January 29, 1983, Cheers won the Golden Globe Award for Best Musical or Comedy Television Series of 1982, and Shelley Long won a Golden Globe Award as the Best Supporting Actress in Television. Cheers did not win any Golden Globes for categories related to comedy television of 1983 at the 1984 ceremony. On Thursday, March 17, 1983, Cheers won the Favorite New Television Comedy Program award at the 9th Annual People's Choice Awards.

== DVD and Blu-ray release ==
Season 1 of Cheers was released on Region 1 DVD on May 20, 2003, twenty years after its season finale and ten years after the series finale, "One for the Road", were broadcast on television. Elizabeth Skipper of DVD Verdict rated video quality 80 percent and the sound quality 65 percent, but called the menu settings "ugly" and uninspiring, and the special features "lackluster" and consisting mostly of compilation clips of this season. Jonathan Boudreaux of TVDVDreviews.com found the video "clear and sharp", and found the sound quality similar to that of the television broadcast.

On Blu-ray, the first season did not receive its own separate release. The first season was released as part of the Cheers: The Complete Series box set on April 25, 2023, with the DVD special features intact.

Cheers: The Complete First Season
Set Details		Special Features
22 episodes; 4-disc set; 1:33:1 aspect ratio; English - Stereo; Closed captioning (Region 1); Subtitles: Danish, English, Spanish, French, Italian, Norwegian, Swedish (Region 2)		Setting The Bar: A Conversation with Ted Danson; Love at First Fight: Opposites Distract; Coach Ernie Pantusso's Rules of the Game; I'll Drink to That: Stormin' Norm-isms; "It's a Little Known Fact..." Cheers Trivia Game
Release Dates
Region 1	Region 2	Region 4
May 20, 2003	24 November 2003	15 January 2004

== Notes ==
=== References ===
- Bjorklund, Dennis A (September 2014) [First published in 1993 as print edition]. Cheers TV Show: A Comprehensive Reference (e-Book ed.). Praetorian Publishing. ISBN 9780967985237.
- Wendt, George (2009). Drinking with George. New York: Simon Spotlight Entertainment. ISBN 978-1-4391-4958-4.

==== Ratings notes ====
According to Los Angeles Times, ratings from 1982 to 1983 were based on 83.3 million households with at least one television set. "Television Ratings" column list is located at Part VI, "Calendar" section. Below sources originated from Los Angeles Times, republished in microfilm copies, which may be located in your local library.
