= The Boys in the Bar =

- Cheers episode
- Episode no.: Season 1 Episode 16
- Directed by: James Burrows
- Written by: Ken Levine; David Isaacs
- Original air date: January 27, 1983
- Running time: 30 minutes (with commercials)

Guest appearance
- Alan Autry as Tom Kenderson

Episode chronology
← Previous "Father Knows Last"	Next → "Diane's Perfect Date"
- Cheers (season 1)

"The Boys in the Bar" is the sixteenth episode of the first season of the American situation comedy television series Cheers. It originally aired on January 27, 1983, on NBC. It is co-written by Ken Levine and David Isaacs and directed by James Burrows. This episode's narrative deals with homosexuality, coming out, and homophobia. It was inspired by the coming out story of former Los Angeles Dodgers baseball player, Glenn Burke. In this episode, Sam's former teammate, Tom—portrayed by Alan Autry—reveals his homosexuality and Sam slowly becomes supportive of him. The bar's regular customers express their disdain toward Sam's support and fear that because of Sam's support of Tom, the bar will become a place full of homosexuals. The episode's Nielsen ratings at its initial airing were low but improved after subsequent airings on NBC. This episode has received more attention since.

== Plot ==
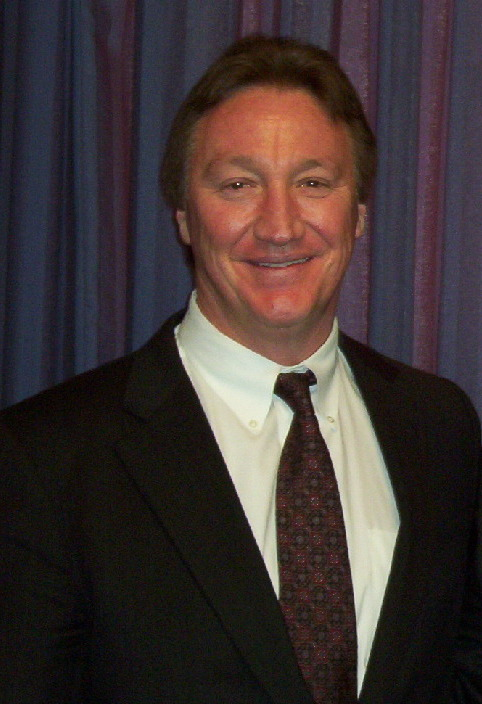
Alan Autry portrays Tom Kenderson, a Boston Red Sox player coming out as gay in this episode.

Tom Kenderson, an old friend and baseball teammate of bartender Sam Malone, announces in his forthcoming autobiography that he is homosexual. At a press conference held at the bar, Sam, having not read the book in advance, is shocked by Tom's revelation. Diane Chambers helps Sam to calm down, and they discuss Tom. Moments later, Sam publicly accepts and supports Tom and his sexuality, which local newspapers report. The next day, as they read the newspaper, the bar's regular patrons—including Norm—express their disdain toward homosexuals. They worry that Sam's support for his old friend will turn Cheers into a gay bar. Diane criticizes their homophobia telling them that gays are normal people and reveals there are two gay men in the bar as they speak.

The regulars conclude that three male newcomers are homosexual and try to persuade Sam to escort them from the bar. Sam becomes concerned about dividing his loyalties between his regular customers and potential gay customers. Employees and regulars—pulled in by Diane—argue over the three newcomers in the billiard room. When the newcomers congratulate Sam for supporting Tom, Sam decides not to eject them to avoid discriminating among his customers. Norm and the other regulars trick the three men into assuming that 7:00 pm is the last call for drinks at and escort them from the bar. Diane tells the regulars that the men they escorted out are not homosexual and that the two gay men are still present. The two men in question kiss Norm on his cheeks.

== Production ==
"The Boys in the Bar" was co-written by Ken Levine and David Isaacs and was directed by James Burrows. The coming out story of former Los Angeles Dodgers baseball player Glenn Burke was the inspiration for the plot. Levine wanted to explore homophobia in a sports bar in this episode. However, NBC deemed the story "too risky" for Cheers, whose Nielsen ratings were low during its first season in 1982–83. Nevertheless, the production of this episode went ahead for five days; rehearsals were problem-free and some minor tweaks that did not have major effects on the script were made. The cast rehearsed for the first three days of production, the camera crew rehearsed on the fourth day and a studio audience were present on the fifth. The cast—including Ted Danson, who advised Levine not to change a word—loved this episode, and the crew found it—especially the cheek-kissing scene at the end—hilarious. However, according to Levine, the live studio audience remained silent during filming; the ending was reshot with Norm given an extra line, "better than Vera", referring to the character's wife's kissing.

Silence. Dead silence. You could hear crickets. It wasn't like some people got it and others didn't. Nobody laughed. Not a single person ... No one had an explanation.

— Ken Levine

Background actors portraying bar customers are John Furey, Michael Kearns, Kenneth Tigar, Lee Ryan, Jack Knight, and Tom Babson. Shannon Sullivan and John Bluto portray reporters at the press conference. Harry Anderson reprises his role of Harry "the Hat" Gittes in the cold open.

== Broadcast and ratings ==
"The Boys in the Bar" aired at 9:30 pm on NBC on January 27, 1983, competing against CBS's Simon & Simon and ABC's It Takes Two. It ranked 41st out of 67 nationally-broadcast programs and garnered a Nielsen rating of 14.9. In Alaska, it aired on February 10, 1983, at 8:00 pm AKT. The episode was broadcast again on July 28, 1983, at 9:30 pm against a rerun of Simon & Simon and ABC's television film Shooting Stars. It ranked 25th with a Nielsen rating of 12.8 and a 23 share. It aired again on January 17, 1985, at 9:00 pm against Simon & Simon and a rerun of ABC's television film Who Will Love My Children?, ranking 13th with a Nielsen rating of 20.4—equivalent to 17.5 million homes.

== Critical reaction ==
[...] In the 28 years since that episode aired, the number of male professional athletes that have come out is staggeringly low, and the number of highly visible, well-known athletes to do is essentially zero. Progress has been made, but 28 years doesn't feel like a very long time when it's unclear how [many of] the audience [are] behind Sam and Diane in this episode and how many of them are secretly siding with Norm the entire time.

— Ryan McGee from The A.V. Club, January 12, 2012

Cory Barker of the website TV Surveillance disdained Norm's comments about homosexuals but called them "honest for the time and circumstances".

According to the book What's Good on TV, Sam's concerns about losing regular, anti-homosexual bar customers if Cheers were to become a gay bar is depicted as sympathetic towards regulars and "a practical argument" instead of a "strong moral argument". Stephen Tropiano called this episode "the definite highlight of Season One" in PopMatters and, in the 2002 book The Prime Time Closet, Tropiano called it a moral lesson about judging a person based on appearances. Nevertheless, Tropiano said that the fictional baseball player Tom Kenderson is typical of gay characters related to a series regular, appear just once, are exploited for delivering a message about homosexuality to the audience, and are then discarded, never to be "seen, heard, or mentioned again".

The A.V. Club critics discussed this episode in 2012. Phil Nugent found it unfunny and intended as a message to tolerate homosexuals by making Norm and other regulars appear "ridiculous". Noel Murray said that the episode's "bifurcated structure" prevented more development for Sam's old baseball teammate, and he found the "stereotypes" of gay men dated. He and Donna Bowman considered it to be more about men securing their own machismo than tolerating homosexuality. Ryan McGee found the studio audience's reactions to this episode ambiguous, especially years after this episode aired.

Decider critic Brett White wrote in 2017 that this episode is "structured to deconstruct the notion of stereotypes" and shows that despite some regular bar patrons' lack of "open-minded[ness], Cheers is a bar for everyone". White also noted that Norm's gaydar is tainted with "uninformed stereotypes". However, White also wrote:

As progressive as this episode is for 1983, it still falls short in the same ways that most sitcoms of the 20th century did when handling LGBT issues. There are no regular LGBT characters in the cast, so Cliff, Norm and Carla aren't challenged to grow after this episode. Sam's friend Tom disappears after the press conference, never to be seen again. Even the supposedly gay guys turn out to probably not be gay. In the absence of any actual dynamic gay characters, it's Diane that takes on the ally role and acts as the voice of gay rights.

Screen Rant critic Simone Torn wrote in 2019 that the characters' homophobic remarks would "[make] this episode uncomfortable to modern audiences" and is one of "ten things from Cheers that have not aged well." Joseph J. and Kate Darowski in their 2019 book Cheers: A Cultural History rated the episode three out of four stars ("good episode").

== Accolades ==
This episode was nominated for "Outstanding Writing in a Comedy Series" at the 1983 Primetime Emmy Awards, but lost to "Give Me a Ring Sometime"—the pilot episode of Cheers. (Note: "Diane's Perfect Date" was nominated for the "Outstanding Writing in a Comedy Series" award at the 1983 Primetime Emmy Awards.) In 1984, it won the Writers Guild of America Award for Best Screenplay - Episodic Comedy award, along with "Give Me a Ring Sometime". In 1983, the Alliance for Gay and Lesbian Artists in the Entertainment Industry (AGLA) awarded this episode for its "realistic [depiction] of homosexuals" and for Sam's support for homosexuals in the bar.
