= Cliff Clavin =

Fictional character in the series Cheers

- Cheers character
- from "Please Mr. Postman" (episode 158, 1989)
- First appearance: Cheers: "Give Me a Ring Sometime" (season 1, episode 1)
- Last appearance: Frasier: "Cheerful Goodbyes" (season 9, episode 21)
- Portrayed by: John Ratzenberger

In-universe information
- Gender: Male
- Occupation: Mail carrier
- Family: Esther Clavin (mother); Cliff Clavin, Sr. (father)
- Nationality: American

Clifford C. Clavin Jr. (born 1947 or 1949) is a fictional character on the American television show Cheers played by John Ratzenberger. A postal worker, he is the bar's resident know-it-all. Cliff was not originally scripted in the series' pilot episode, "Give Me a Ring Sometime", but the producers decided to add a know-it-all character and Ratzenberger helped flesh it out. The actor made guest appearances as Cliff on The Tortellis, St. Elsewhere, Wings, and Frasier.

== Development ==
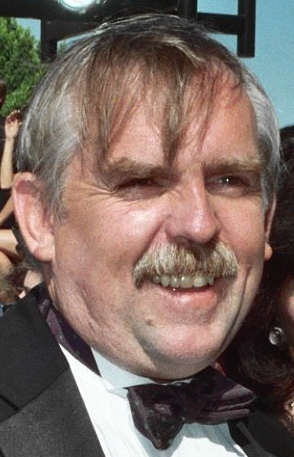
Ratzenberger at the 1992 Emmy Awards

=== Creation ===
The original script for the 1982 pilot, "Give Me a Ring Sometime", did not include Norm Peterson or Cliff Clavin. George Wendt and John Ratzenberger originally auditioned for a minor character, George, and George Wendt was hired for that role. George was Diane Chambers' first customer, had one line (consisting of the order, "Beer!") and was intended for only one episode.

Since Wendt was cast as George (who evolved into Norm Peterson), Ratzenberger suggested to the producers that a know-it-all character should be added; this led to the creation of Cliff Clavin before the pilot was filmed. Ratzenberger based his role on a police officer in his hometown of Bridgeport, Connecticut. Cliff was originally a security guard, but two days before the pilot's filming he was changed to a postman; the producers thought a postman would be more knowledgeable than a security guard. Ratzenberger agreed to seven episodes of the first season, but his role expanded.

Cliff is the kind of guy who wishes he'd been a combat Marine, but maybe he was nearsighted or had flat feet and became a mailman. He loves the respect he gets. [...] As for women, Cliff is like the construction workers who whistle at women but turn to a quivering mass when they're face-to-face with a woman. The greatest fear of men is that they won't live up to their expectations.

— John Ratzenberger, Associated Press, June 1985

Stephen Tobolowsky told SplitSider.com that he had auditioned for Cliff.

=== Other appearances ===
On the Cheers 200th-episode special, host John McLaughlin asked Ratzenberger about Cliff Clavin. The actor replied that Cliff would describe himself as the "wingnut that holds Western civilization together"; however, Ratzenberger said he would describe Cliff simply as "a winged nut". When McLaughlin asked Ratzenberger if there was any part of him in Cliff, the actor replied that although he was interested in fascinating facts, the only part of Cliff in him was that they both wear white socks.

Cliff appeared in 273 episodes of Cheers between 1982 and 1993. He also made guest appearances as an animated character (voiced by Ratzenberger) in The Simpsons episode "Fear of Flying", in The Tortellis episode "Frankie Comes to Dinner", in the Wings episode "The Story of Joe" and the Frasier episode "Cheerful Goodbyes".

In 2014, Ratzenberger reprised his role as Cliff in the RadioShack Super Bowl XLVIII commercial "The '80s Called".

== Role ==
Cliff is a postal worker, and Norm Peterson's best friend. He lives with his mother, Esther Clavin (Frances Sternhagen)—first in his childhood two-story house (which was bulldozed in the sixth season's "The Last Angry Mailman" after Esther sold it to a convenience-store builder), and then in a condominium (which first appears in the season 6 episode "My Fair Clavin") with a sofabed. He is ridiculed by friends and enemies alike, including Carla (Rhea Perlman) and Norm, for his know-it-all attitude. He appears on Jeopardy! in the season-eight episode "What Is... Cliff Clavin?", where he wins $22,000 in the first two rounds with questions that favor him, but loses it all with a wrong answer in Final Jeopardy (launching into a tirade which frightens host Alex Trebek). Cliff has a few relationships (mostly short-lived and hopeless) with women. He then has a relationship with fellow postal worker Margaret O'Keefe (Annie Golden) since Cheers' seventh season (1988–89). When Margaret becomes pregnant with another man's child in 1993's "Do Not Forsake Me O My Postman", Cliff stays by her side as the baby's stepfather before Margaret returns to the child's biological father.

In "The Barstoolie" (1985), Cliff meets his father, Cliff Clavin Sr. (Dick O'Neill), who left Cliff and his mother years earlier when Cliff was still a child. Cliff later realizes that his father is a fraudster and a fugitive from justice, and will run off again. Cliff does not want to turn his father in; Cliff Sr. disappears, leaving his son devastated.

In the 1993 series finale, Cliff finally receives a promotion. In "The Show Where Sam Shows Up" (1995), an episode of the Cheers spinoff Frasier, Sam (Ted Danson) tells Frasier that Cliff has not left home since he read an article about flesh-eating bacteria; however, Sam then discovers that Cliff is one of the other men with whom Sam's fiancé Sheila (Téa Leoni) had had sex. In another Frasier episode, "The Show Where Woody Shows Up", Woody tells Frasier that Cliff almost married a mail-order bride, but she decided to go back to Bosnia after spending a few days with him. In another Frasier episode, "Cheerful Goodbyes", Cliff has his retirement party at the airport bar; he had planned to move to Florida, but decides to stay in Boston (to Carla's dismay).

== Reception ==
On the NBC News website, Wendall Wittler called Cliff a "classic" character; however, Wittler found his friendship with Norm Peterson "superficial" and unworthy of comparison with the relationship between Ralph Kramden (Jackie Gleason) and Ed Norton (Art Carney) on The Honeymooners.

According to an April 1–4, 1993 telephone survey of 1,011 people by the Times Mirror Center for the People and the Press (now the Pew Research Center), (Note: The margin of error in the survey was ±3%, according to the polls.) Sam Malone was voted a "favorite character" by twenty-six percent of respondents and Cliff Clavin by two percent. Choosing a character for a spinoff, 15 percent voted for Sam Malone, 29 percent opposed a character spinoff, and less than 10 percent voted for Cliff.

Cliff's appearance on Jeopardy! in "What Is... Cliff Clavin?" received several reviews. In his book Hope, Andrew Razeghi described Cliff as a poster child for psychologist J. P. Guilford for a response to the Final Jeopardy! clue which Razeghi considered neither right nor wrong. Jeffrey Robinson of DVD Talk found the Jeopardy! category topics during Cliff's appearance (relating to the post office, beer, and other items fitting Cliff) a "riot". In the Jeopardy! fan community, Cliff's losing $22,000 (won in two rounds) in Final Jeopardy! inspired "Clavin's rule", discouraging future contestants from attempting the same.

== Lawsuit ==
In 1993, Ratzenberger and Wendt sued Host International for copyright infringement, trademark infringement and violating the actors' personality rights. The company operated airport lounges styled similarly to Cheers which included two robots, one heavyset and the other a postal worker, which the actors claimed resembled Cliff Clavin and Norm Peterson. The lawsuit was declined at its first and second hearings. At the first, the judge ruled that the defendant did not violate copyright because Paramount Pictures had already granted it a license to produce Cheers-based bars. At the second, the judge ruled that the robots did not resemble the characters. In 1997, the Ninth Circuit Court of Appeals reversed both rulings on the grounds that Paramount's copyright claim might not have more weight than Ratzenberger and Wendt's ownership of publicity and that the resemblance claim should be decided by a jury, not a judge. The case resulted in an undisclosed 2001 settlement by Host International.

== Notes ==
Footnotes

Inline citations

=== References ===
- Wendt, George. Drinking with George. New York: Simon Spotlight Entertainment, 2009. Print. ISBN 978-1-4391-4958-4.
- Razeghi, Andrew (2006). "The Psychobiology of Cliff Clavin". Hope: How Triumphant Leaders Create the Future. John Wiley & Sons. ISBN 978-0-7879-8126-6.
