= Norm Peterson =

Fictional character in the series Cheers

- Cheers character
- Norm sitting at his favorite seat with a beer in "Cheers: The Motion Picture" (season 5, episode 24)
- First appearance: Cheers: "Give Me a Ring Sometime" (season 1, episode 1)
- Last appearance: Frasier: "Cheerful Goodbyes" (season 9, episode 21)
- Portrayed by: George Wendt

In-universe information
- Full name: Hilary Norman Peterson
- Gender: Male
- Occupation: U.S. Army (Fort Dix); U.S. Coast Guard; Accountant; Painter & decorator Barfly; Brewery Beer Taster
- Family: Mervyn Peterson (father); Hilary Peterson (grandfather)
- Spouses: Vera Kreitzer (from 1972)
- Relatives: Donna Kreitzer (sister-in-law)
- Nationality: American

Hilary Norman Peterson is a regular fictional character on the American television show Cheers. The character was portrayed by actor George Wendt and is named Hilary after his paternal grandfather.

Norm appeared in all 275 episodes of Cheers from 1982 to 1993 and was initially the only customer featured in the show's main cast, later joined by best friend Cliff Clavin, Frasier Crane, and Lilith Sternin. Along with Sam Malone and Carla Tortelli, Norm is one of only three characters to appear in every episode of Cheers. He also made one guest appearance each in the three other sitcoms set in the Cheers universe: the Frasier episode "Cheerful Goodbyes," the Wings episode "The Story of Joe" and the spin-off The Tortellis.

== Casting and creation ==
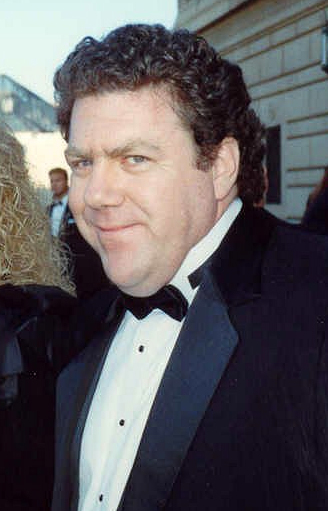
George Wendt

In the original script of the 1982 pilot, "Give Me a Ring Sometime," there was no Norm Peterson. George Wendt and John Ratzenberger auditioned for the same role, originally named George, and Wendt was hired for that role. George was Diane Chambers's first customer, appeared at the end of this episode, could not bear her long explanation of becoming a waitress, and had only one line consisting of one word: "Beer!" The writers expanded Wendt's role before the pilot was filmed, and the character evolved into Norm Peterson, the first onscreen customer to enter the bar and who "badgered Diane rather than the other way around." Show co-creator Les Charles stated that the character was based on a frequent customer he met while working as a bartender during college.

Meanwhile, Ratzenberger suggested to the producers that a know-it-all character should be added, resulting in Cliff Clavin.

I have a hard time talking about Norm. It's like he's too close to me, but I don't think he's changed over the years. They moved him from being an accountant to painter and decorator, but that was basically for some storylines. He's still the same Norm. I think he's the toughest to write for because he's not really anything. He's just funny.

— George Wendt, November 1989

== Role ==
Norm's entrance into the bar is a running gag on Cheers, typically beginning with a greeting by Norm, usually "Afternoon (or Evening), everybody!". This is followed by the bar crowd yelling his name (except Diane Chambers, who would follow them with a more refined "Norman"). Afterwards, someone, usually either Sam, Coach, or Woody (who addresses Norm as "Mr. Peterson") will ask how Norm is doing, and what he'd like to order, and Norm usually responds with a witty remark, frequently about his life, and orders a beer. Norm is also greeted with the customary "Norm!" shout at other locations, including a bowling alley ("From Beer to Eternity", season 4, episode 9), The Hungry Heifer ("Cheers: The Motion Picture", season 5, episode 24), and Gary's Olde Towne Tavern, Cheers' rival bar ("Bar Wars VI", season 10, episode 23). When Sam asks why the people at Gary's know him by name, Norm replies that he goes there on Christmas when Cheers is closed. A recurring gag in the series is, following a commercial, for the bartender to ask Norm if he wants another beer; Norm replies "one quick one," after which he inevitably stays a lot longer. "Norm" is actually the first word of Frederick Crane, son of Frasier Crane and Lilith Sternin. (However, Lilith joyously believes that he said "Mommy!")

Prior to the show, Norm was born in Chicago, and moved to Boston to become an accountant, and is a lifelong Boston Celtics fan who went to Boston Garden as a child. Norm previously served in the United States Coast Guard, though in an earlier episode he stated he had been in the Army. He loses his job in an accounting firm by defending Diane from his boss, and after struggling for a few years as an independent accountant, eventually becomes a housepainter. Norm was also revealed to be an accomplished interior decorator and beer taster, capable of spotting a bad vat in a factory by drinking a single bottle.

Even when unemployed, Norm is the bar's best customer. A running gag throughout the series are the numerous jokes made about the enormous size of Norm's tab at Cheers: several large binders are shown as being just a portion of it. In the episode "Home Malone" (season 9, episode 24), when Woody's rich, naïve girlfriend Kelly waitresses at Cheers to gain "real-life experience," Norm convinces her that the tab is a record of the beers for which he has already paid, and for each new beer a mark should be erased. In the finale, Sam jokes that he has to have Norm's total tab calculated by NASA. The only time he was seen to pay off any of his tab was when new manager Rebecca Howe temporarily cut him off after discovering he owed almost $850, but she agreed to payment in kind by him painting her office and apartment. This led to him setting up as a housepainter. Additionally, when Sam regains ownership of the bar in the ninth season, one of his first acts as owner is to eradicate all amounts outstanding on existing bar tabs (for which Norm is profoundly grateful). Norm also annually receives a complimentary beer on his birthday.

Norm's best friend is postman and fellow barfly Cliff Clavin.

Norm's wife Vera is often mentioned but her face is never seen. When she is finally shown, her face is covered in pie thrown by Diane (season 5, episode 9 "Thanksgiving Orphans,") and the actress is uncredited. The only other times she is seen, viewers can see only her legs and at one time her waving from a car which drives past Cheers on her 15th wedding anniversary. Vera is the butt of many of Norm's jokes, but on many occasions, Norm has professed secretly an undying love for his wife or defended her honor. He also refused to cheat on her in the episode "Norm's Big Audit" where a female IRS agent was prepared to overlook his tax evasion if he did. He explained in this instance that he felt he was a bad husband but would not cheat on his wife as it would make him a bad person. Norm and Vera separated during the second season of Cheers but reconciled in the last episode of the season, contrasting the romance between Sam and Diane, who enjoyed a romance then bitterly broke up in that last episode. When Vera got a job at Melville's, however, he was deeply disturbed by her proximity to him during his bar time. Vera was played by George Wendt's real-life wife, Bernadette Birkett.

In the Cheers episode "It's a Wonderful Wife" (season 9, episode 21), Vera tells Rebecca off-camera that Norm's real first name is Hilary, a fact relayed to the rest of the bar by Carla. He explains that he was named after his grandfather who "once killed a man for laughing at him." Cliff asks if his grandfather really killed a man for laughing at his first name and Norm replies, "Not exactly. He was a surgeon and he sort of botched an operation."

When not sipping beer at Cheers, Norm satisfies his hunger at an eatery called The Hungry Heifer, whose emblem is a young cow smacking her chops. The customers there greet him just the same as the Cheers patrons do. He knows the waitresses by name, and usually orders a meal called a Feeding Frenzy, a monstrous supply of corn and beef. He denigrated the eatery when he first visited it in season 2, but when the place was being shut down in season 9, he insinuated it was an important place to him throughout his life and said he knew the owner since at latest his college years. Corrine (played by Doris Grau), who worked at Cheers occasionally as a temp waitress, was a server at The Hungry Heifer and said the waitstaff knew Norm as "the guy who comes back."

On a lark in college, he became an ordained minister of the Church of the Living Desert after seeing an advertisement in the back of a magazine.

In season 7, Sam takes a temporary bartending job in Cancún, Mexico. One of his patrons, Pepe, greatly resembles Norm in appearance and mannerisms.

== Other appearances ==
George Wendt guest starred as Norm Peterson on St. Elsewhere, Cheers' first spinoff The Tortellis, Wings, and The Simpsons episode "Fear of Flying", which also guest starred Ted Danson, Rhea Perlman, Woody Harrelson, and John Ratzenberger as their respective characters. Years after Cheers ended, Wendt played Norm in a 2002 episode of its spinoff Frasier, where he got along famously with Martin Crane. (Martin: "Wow, that's some mug callus you've got there." Norm: "Judging from your grip, I'd say you were a can man.") Norm was most recently seen in animated form, voiced by Wendt, on Family Guy in the episodes "Road to Rupert" and "Three Kings". Domino's Pizza released a commercial in February 2020 parodying Cheers (including the opening theme song and a Domino's version of the Cheers sign) with Norm entering a Domino's, surprised to find that no one knows his name. Norm's face was scanned from a Cheers episode to replace a body double's face.

== Cultural references ==
- In The Simpsons episode "Flaming Moe's", Barney Gumble walks into the newly successful and popular Moe's Tavern to be greeted with the friendly cry of "Barney!" which satirizes Norm's entrance When a bartender similar to Woody Boyd asks him how he is doing, Barney burps in response.
- In the How I Met Your Mother episode "Swarley", Barney Stinson walks into Maclaren's Pub to the greeting of "Swarley!" with the bartender Carl then playing the Cheers theme song. This was to make fun of Barney's new nickname, and to reference Norm's entrance to Cheers.
- In a Doonesbury storyline in which Uncle Duke operates a bar in Kuwait City during the Gulf War, when a general (from context, Norman Schwarzkopf Jr.) enters, everyone at the club greets him with an enthusiastic "Norm!"
- An oblique homage of Norm appears in the series Star Trek: Deep Space Nine in the form of the character named Morn, a corpulent and rather silent alien who has an outstanding tab in Quark's bar.

== Lawsuit ==
In 1993, Wendt and Ratzenberger sued Host International for copyright infringement, trademark infringement, and violating the actors' personality rights. The company operated airport lounges styled similarly to Cheers which included two robots, one heavyset and the other a postal worker, which the actors claimed resembled Norm Peterson and Cliff Clavin. The lawsuit was declined at its first and second hearings. At the first, the judge ruled that the defendant did not violate copyright because Paramount Pictures had already granted it a license to produce Cheers-based bars. At the second, the judge ruled that the robots did not resemble the characters. In 1997, the Ninth Circuit Court of Appeals reversed both rulings on the grounds that Paramount's copyright claim might not have more weight than Wendt and Ratzenberger's ownership of publicity and that the resemblance claim should be decided by a jury, not a judge. The case resulted in an undisclosed settlement in 2001 by Host International.
