= Give Me a Ring Sometime =

- Cheers episode
- Episode no.: Season 1 Episode 1
- Directed by: James Burrows
- Written by: Glen and Les Charles
- Production code: 001
- Original air date: September 30, 1982
- Running time: 24:56

Guest appearance
- Michael McGuire as Sumner Sloane

Episode chronology
← Previous —	Next → "Sam's Women"
- Cheers season 1

"Give Me a Ring Sometime" is the pilot episode and the first episode of the first season of the American situation comedy Cheers. Written by Glen and Les Charles and directed by James Burrows, the episode first aired September 30, 1982, on NBC in the contiguous United States and on October 14, 1982 in Alaska. The pilot episode introduces the characters at the Cheers bar in Boston: employees Sam Malone, Diane Chambers, Coach Ernie Pantusso, and Carla Tortelli; and regular customers Norm Peterson and Cliff Clavin. In this episode, Diane, brought in by her fiancé, meets the employees and patrons of the bar. When she realizes that her fiancé has left her alone in the bar, Diane accepts Sam's offer to be the bar's waitress to start over.

In the original script, the employees were the principal characters, and Norm and Cliff were not included. Later revisions added Norm and Cliff, and scenes were restructured and rewritten. Originally, Cheers' set would be a hotel, but it was ultimately changed to a bar. Ratings were low when the episode first aired, but they were moderately successful in reruns. It has been critically praised over the years, and earned its writers awards for Best Writing in 1983.

== Plot ==
As owner Sam Malone opens the Cheers bar in Boston at the beginning of the series, a professor, Sumner Sloane, and his Boston University student fiancée, Diane Chambers, are the first customers of the day (sans a minor who fails an attempt to buy a beer). They plan to go to Barbados to be married but do not have a wedding ring; Sumner leaves to retrieve the ring from his ex-wife. Sumner returns over an hour later, telling Diane that he could not obtain his ex-wife's ring. His ex-wife calls the bar with a change of heart, so Sumner leaves Diane again. Sam pointedly tells her that Sumner is probably on a plane with his ex-wife. Diane calls the airport to change their flight reservation, and finds out that "Mr. and Mrs. Sloane" have already used it. Heartbroken, she prepares to go home before realizing that her job as Sumner's teaching assistant is gone. Out of pity, Sam offers her a job at Cheers as a waitress. Despite being highly educated, Diane reluctantly accepts the offer when she remembers a number of orders (including special requests) from a table. The following day, Diane's first customer is an international tourist, asking for his lost luggage.

== Casting ==
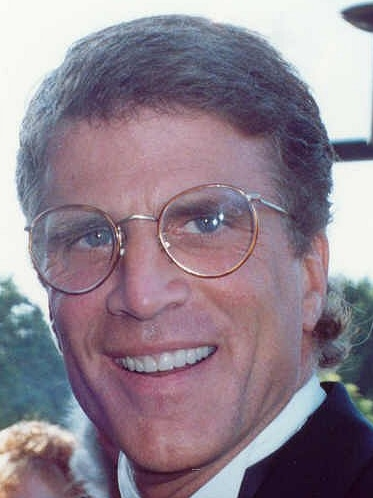
Ted Danson

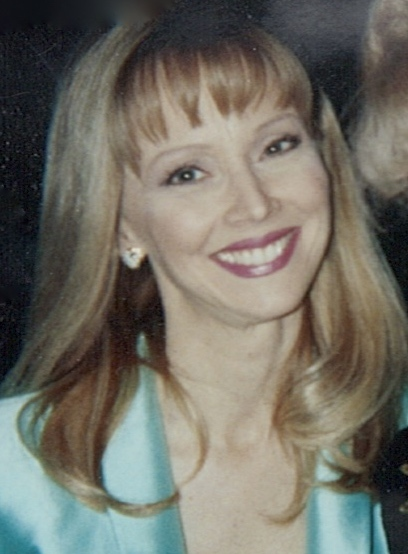
Shelley Long

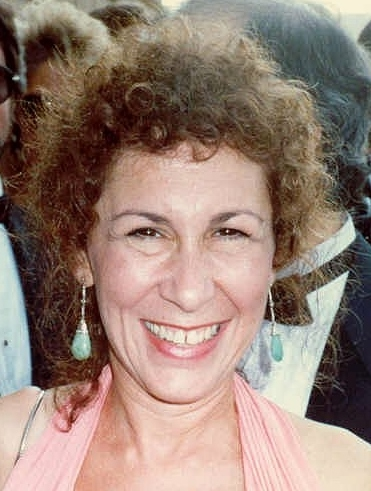
Rhea Perlman

The pilot introduces employees of the bar, Cheers, in Boston, Massachusetts in order of appearance:

- Sam Malone (Ted Danson) is a recovering alcoholic, a former baseball player, a bartender and the owner of Cheers. (Note: Sam Malone is described as a divorced Lothario in the next episode, "Sam's Women".)
- Diane Chambers (Shelley Long) is a graduate student and "bar misfit" who is abandoned by her fiancé, Sumner Sloane. She becomes a waitress at the end of the episode.
- Ernie Pantusso (Nicholas Colasanto) is a "forgetful", "gravelly-voiced bartender", nicknamed "Coach" because he was Sam's coach during his career as a relief pitcher for the Boston Red Sox.
- Carla Tortelli (Rhea Perlman) is a bitter, "wisecracking, cynical waitress" and divorcée whose husband, Nick, (Note: Nick Tortelli first appears onscreen in Season 2 episode "Battle of the Exes" (1984), and is portrayed by Dan Hedaya.) abandons her and her four children.

The creators rejected the idea of casting a star such as Mary Tyler Moore, and sought actors who were previously unknown to the public. They interviewed almost 1,000 people for the four principal roles: Sam Malone, Diane Chambers, Carla Tortelli, and "Coach" Ernie Pantusso. Steve Kolzak (credited as Stephen Kolzak) cast the original characters. According to Danson, Rhea Perlman was the first to be cast. Former umpire Ron Luciano auditioned for Coach; however, the producers "wanted an experienced actor". Robert Prosky, who later appeared as Rebecca Howe's (Kirstie Alley) Navy father in the 1992 Cheers episode "Daddy's Little Middle-Aged Girl" and an author in the 1996 Frasier episode "A Crane's Critique", turned down the role of Coach. Actor-director Nicholas Colasanto won the role.

Auditions were held for Sam and Diane. Three pairs were tested: William Devane and Lisa Eichhorn, Fred Dryer and Julia Duffy, and Ted Danson and Shelley Long. Before the show premiered Danson appeared in 1979's The Onion Field; Long appeared in 1982's Night Shift, starring Henry Winkler of Happy Days. Fred Dryer later appeared as Dave Richards, a sportscaster friend of Sam's, in "Sam at Eleven" in 1982. Sam Malone was originally "a former wide receiver for the New England Patriots", and Fred Dryer was considered for the role because he was a football player. However, NBC executives liked test scenes with Danson and Long so the creators chose them instead, making Sam a former relief pitcher for the Boston Red Sox. Ed O'Neill also auditioned for the role of Sam Malone.

We had some surprises. Some actors were terrific by themselves but not in concert with others. Each actor read the same scene. Everyone got the same chance. We were looking for actors who could make us laugh by being loyal to the characters. Then we matched them up.

— Les Charles, to United Press International, July 11, 1982

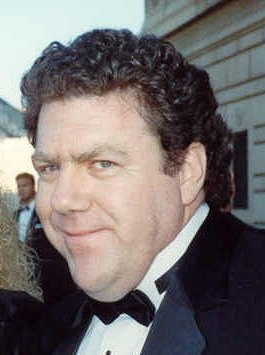
George Wendt

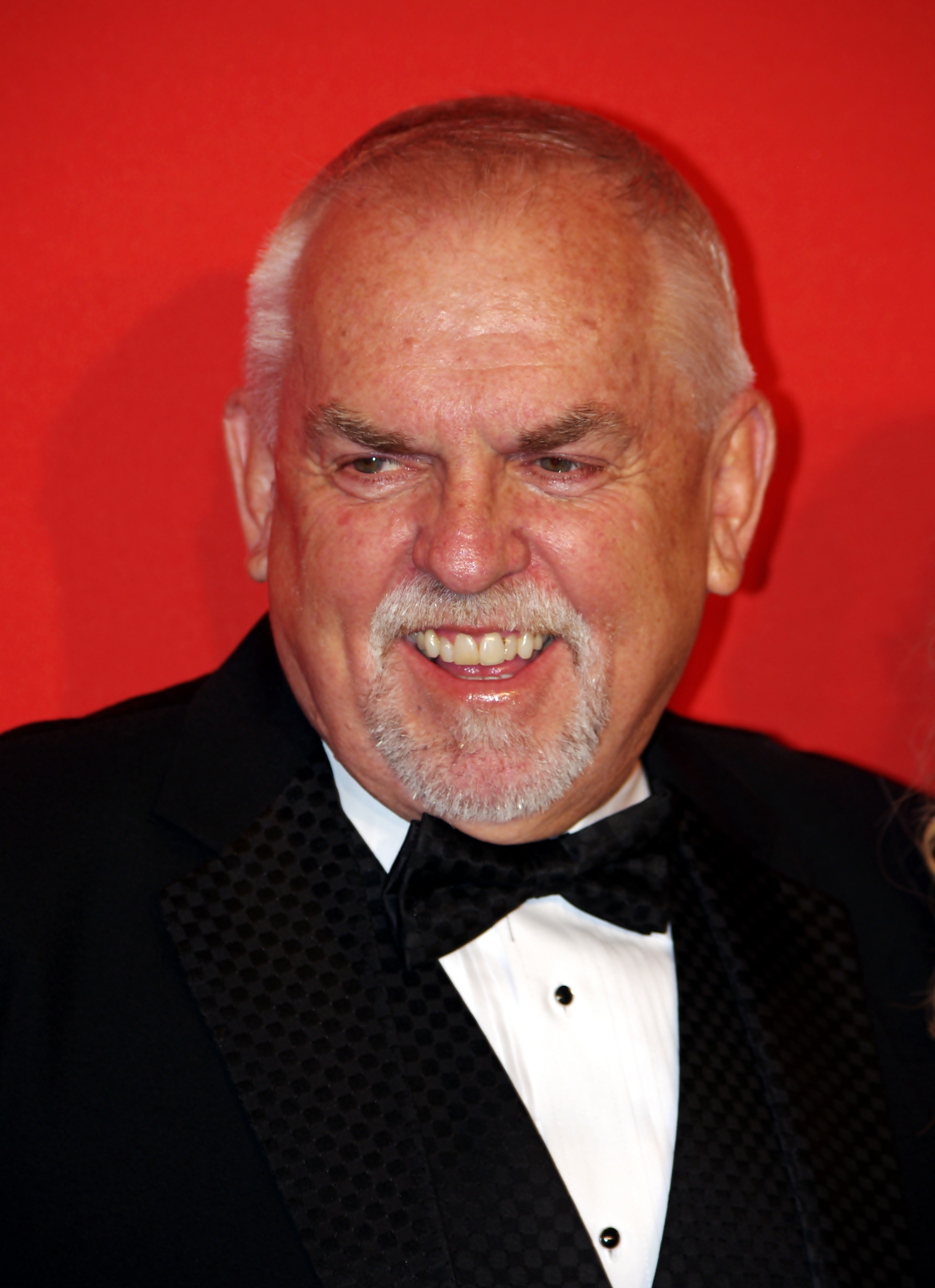
John Ratzenberger

Their respective roles (Norm Peterson and Cliff Clavin) were not envisioned until they auditioned for a minor, originally scripted role.

Two customers were introduced:

- Norm Peterson (George Wendt), recognized by everyone in the bar, enters for a quick drink.
- Cliff Clavin (John Ratzenberger) appears for a conversation with other male patrons about bar trivia. (Note: Actor John Ratzenberger appears as Cliff Clavin and is always credited in the closing credits of every episode of Season 1, including this episode, instead of opening. Moreover, Norm and Cliff were not established as "best friends" until Season 2.)

George Wendt and John Ratzenberger originally auditioned for the role of "George", and Wendt was cast. In the original script, George was Diane's first customer at the end of the episode. Annoyed with Diane's long-winded explanation of how she became a waitress, he delivered his one-word line: "Beer!" After Wendt was cast, the writers revised the script; his role evolved into Norm Peterson, the first onscreen customer to enter the bar and "[badgering] Diane rather than the other way around". After Wendt was cast, Ratzenberger suggested to the producers that a know-it-all character be added; this led to the creation of another character, Cliff Clavin.

One character who was cut from the pilot episode was an unpleasant, racist old woman in a wheelchair named Mrs. Littlefield, supposedly a regular customer of Cheers, who was intended to be a recurring character. Her lines were filmed as part of a rough cut of the pilot. However, the producers decided to cut the character out of the episode, as they found her character did not mesh with other characters or with the overall tone of the show. Nevertheless, the uncredited actress who played her can still be seen as a background performer in a few scenes. Some sources credit this actress as Elaine Strich, although the unidentified actress who is still seen on camera looks nothing like Stritch. In answer to a question about the actress, Cheers writer/producer Ken Levine has stated on his blog "that was not Elaine Stritch." According to the episode's script, the character in question was played by Margaret Wheeler. The producers ultimately decided to eliminate Mrs. Littlefield completely from the show from that point forward, necessitating changes to some yet-to-be-filmed scripts for the first few episodes.

Three other bar patrons have speaking roles in the completed episode: John P. Navin, Jr. portrays a teenage boy in the cold open, Erik Holland has a brief bit as Diane's first customer, and Ron Frazier appears as a barfly who stands at the bar near Cliff (and who offers "Ben Hur" as his choice for the sweatiest movie ever made.)

== Production ==
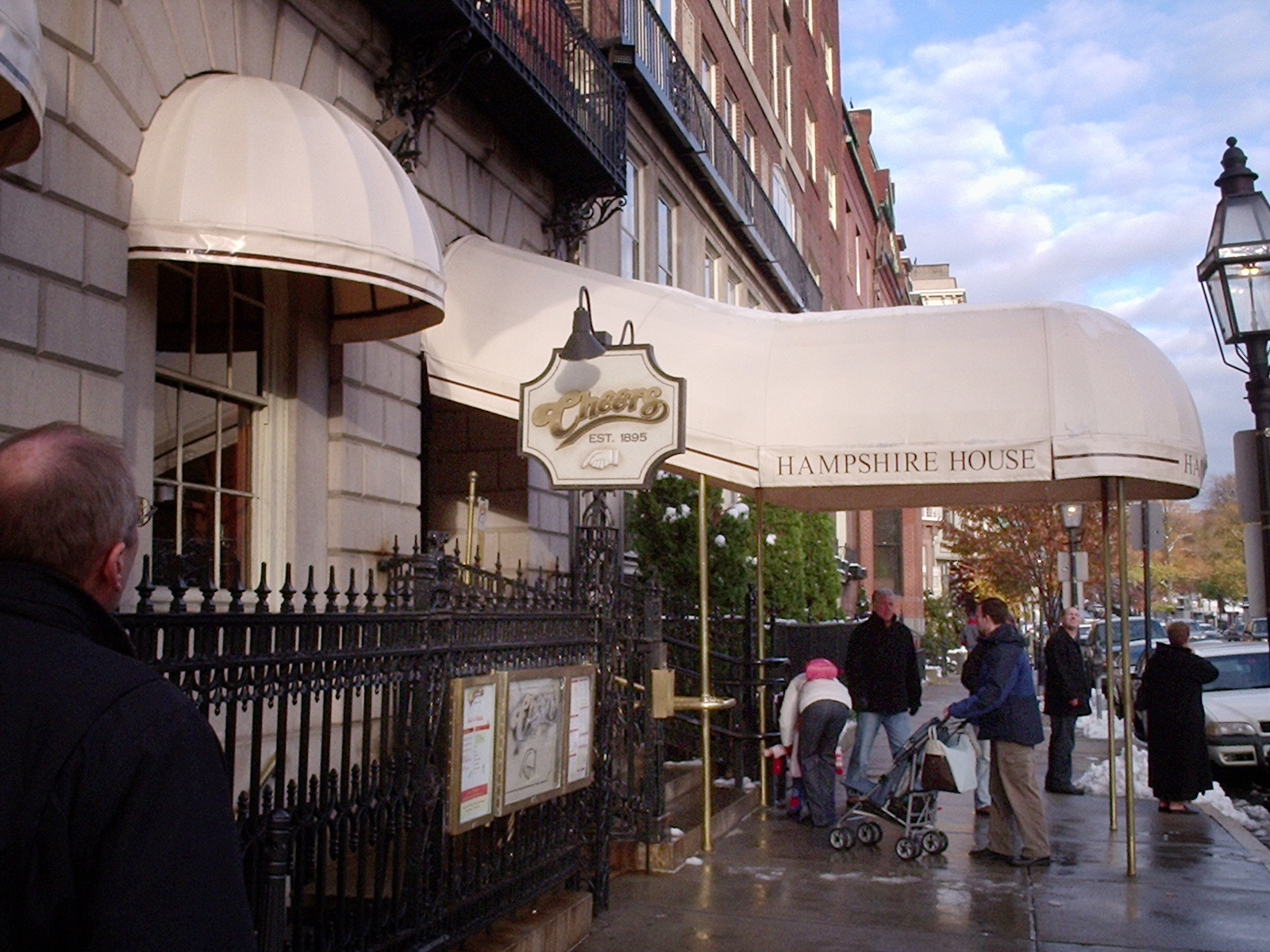
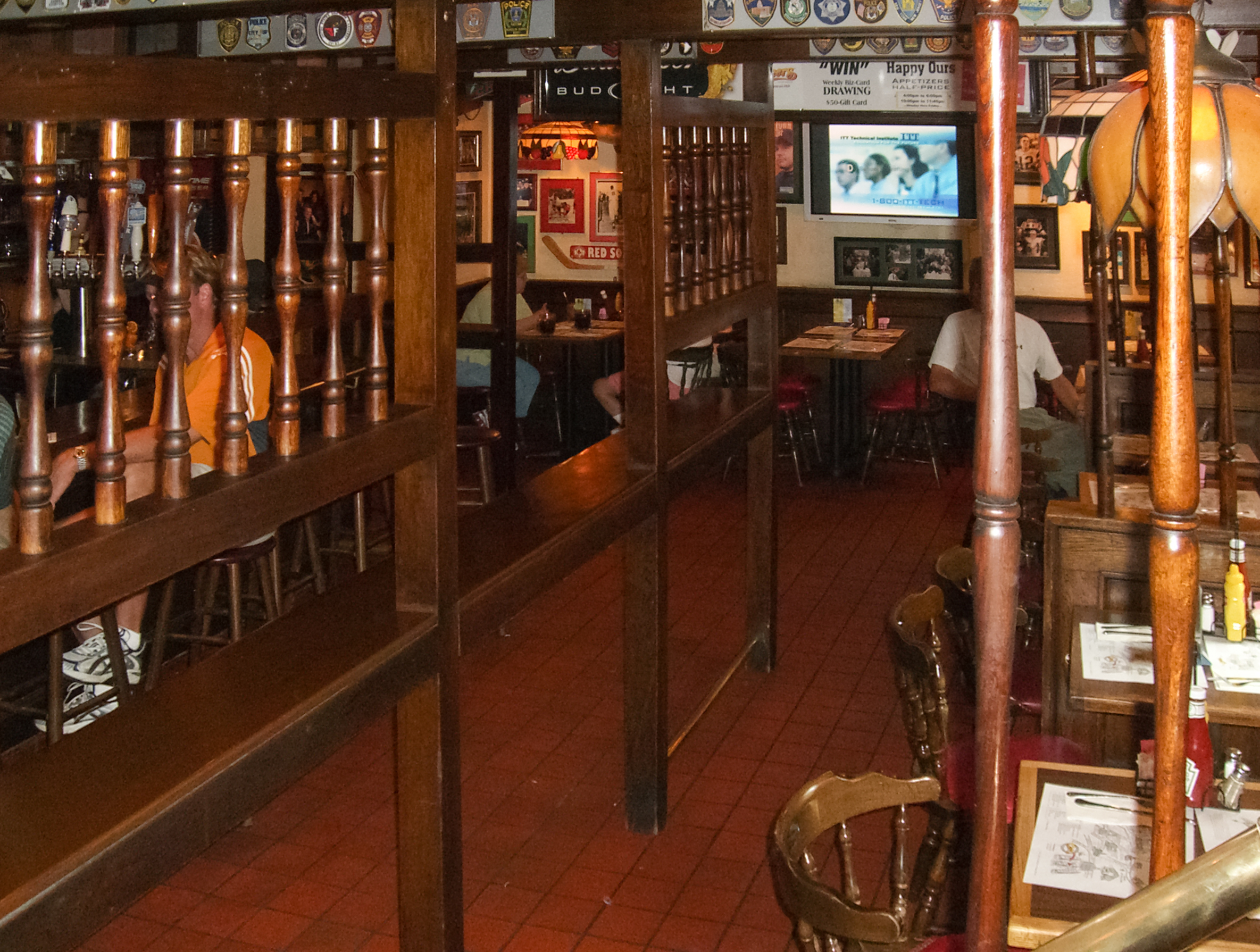
Exterior (left) and interior of the Bull & Finch Pub (now Cheers Beacon Hill), which inspired the show's set

The creators of Cheers (and the crew of Taxi), co-writers Glen and Les Charles and director James Burrows, created a sitcom project in 1981. Initially set in a hotel, the setting changed to a hotel bar and finally a "Boston neighborhood bar". The show was filmed not in a pub, but on Stage 25 of the Paramount Studios lot. Cheers' set was inspired by the Bull & Finch Pub in Boston, now known as Cheers Beacon Hill (pictured, right). A Boston bar was chosen because of its "interior [made out of] brick, polished mahogany, and brass"; the city was chosen because it is "cosmopolitan", "a great sports town" and was not previously explored on television. Because the creators are sports fans, an athletic element was added to the bar. Burrows said that the show was intended to be about a bar which people visit for more than drinks.

Jokes from earlier scripts were used. In one scene, Carla Tortelli orders a phone caller to do something about their unruly children. When one of the bartenders suggests hiring a babysitter, Carla replied that the caller was the babysitter. The cast did not know the ending of the pilot episode during production, since the final draft of the script was dated April 16, 1982.

== Reception ==
=== Ratings ===
The NBC premiere lineup on September 30, 1982 consisted of (beginning at 8:00 pm Eastern and Pacific Time) Fame, Cheers, Taxi and Hill Street Blues. Cheers debuted at 9:00 pm against the two-hour season premiere of Magnum, P.I. and the one-hour season premiere of Too Close for Comfort. It finished in 60th place (out of 63 programs), with a 9.6 Nielsen rating. In Alaska, it premiered on October 14, 1982 at 8:00 pm AKT. On December 23, 1982 the episode was rerun, receiving an 11.5 rating and finishing 57th out of 68 programs airing from December 20–26, 1982.

=== Critical reaction ===
When the episode originally aired in 1982, Fred Rothenberg of the Associated Press called it an introduction to a "new wise-cracking comedy", "a warm and wacky companion of a television show, a delightful place to spend idle time, [and] a five-star watering hole" known as Cheers. Television and radio critic Mike Drew said it was not great but "funnier [...] with cute lines [...] than" any other sitcom, even those (like Archie Bunker's Place on TV and Duffy's Tavern on radio) set in bars. Fred L. Smith of The News and Courier found this episode similar to Taxi: "Both are set in a place of business−Cheers at a [Boston bar], Taxi at a [New York taxi company]—both have a sensible guy and a pretty, preppy girl as main characters—Ted Danson and Shelley Long in Cheers and Judd Hirsch and Marilu Henner in Taxi—and both are wacky comedies." He found it "amusing"; some jokes, funny; many others, forced; and the number of "weird characters" in the show greater than their real-life bar counterparts.

In 2009, Lex Walker on the Just Press Play website found this episode "sadder and more sentimental" than funny; the episode focuses "less on character development and more on" Diane restarting her life as a waitress after the loss of love, and he said it contradicts "what [Cheers] will grow to be". Nevertheless, he called the episode a true introduction to the series and considered the intertwining stories of Sam and his friends the series' premise. In 2010, Robin Raven from Yahoo! Voices called it one of her top five Cheers episodes. In 2011, Austin Lugar from The Film Yap website called it the "best". IGN ranked it number nine of the top ten Cheers episodes.

Joseph J. and Kate Darowski in their 2019 book Cheers: A Cultural History rated the episode all four stars.

=== Awards ===
At the 1983 Primetime Emmy Awards, writers and co-creators Glen and Les Charles won the Emmy Award for Outstanding Writing in a Comedy Series for this episode. (Note: "The Boys in the Bar" and "Diane's Perfect Date" were also nominated for Outstanding Writing in a Comedy Series.) The brothers also received a Writers Guild of America Award for Best Screenplay - Episodic Comedy. The episode earned production designer Richard Sylbert and set decorator George Gaines an Emmy nomination for Outstanding Art Direction for a Series (won by Tales of the Gold Monkey). "Give Me A Ring Sometime" was Shelley Long's winning submission for the Primetime Emmy Award for Outstanding Lead Actress in a Comedy Series.

=== Home media ===
The first home media release of the episode was a VHS cassette in the United States on September 29, 1993. It was part of the initial launch of seven cassettes by Paramount Home Video. One volume contained only the pilot episode itself, while each of other six volumes contained two episodes. The episode was released on Region 1 DVD as part of the season one box on May 20, 2003, and as part of Fan Favorites: The Best of Cheers on March 6, 2012.

== See also ==
- List of Cheers episodes
