= Diane Chambers =

Fictional character in the series Cheers

- Cheers character
- In "An American Family" (season 3, episode 9)
- First appearance: Cheers: "Give Me a Ring Sometime" (season 1, episode 1)
- Last appearance: Cheers: "I Do, Adieu" (season 5, episode 26; as main character); "One for the Road" (season 11, episode 25; as guest character); Frasier: "The Show Where Diane Comes Back" (in-person) (season 3, episode 14); "Don Juan in Hell" (fantasy) (season 9, episode 2)
- Portrayed by: Shelley Long

In-universe information
- Gender: Female
- Occupation: Waitress (1982–1987); Writer (1987–present)
- Family: Spencer Chambers (father); Helen Chambers (mother)
- Nationality: American

Diane Chambers is a fictional character in the American television situation comedy show Cheers, portrayed by Shelley Long and created by Glen and Les Charles. She is one of two main protagonists in the first five seasons of the series. After her fiancé Sumner Sloan abandons her in the Cheers bar in the pilot episode, Diane works as a bar waitress. She has an on-off relationship with the womanizing bartender Sam Malone (Ted Danson) and a one-year relationship with Frasier Crane (Kelsey Grammer), who later becomes a main character of the series and its spin-off Frasier. When Long left the series during the fifth season, the producers wrote her character out. After that, they added her permanent replacement Rebecca Howe, a businesswoman played by Kirstie Alley, in the sixth season. Shelley Long made a special guest appearance as Diane in the series finale, as well as in Frasier twice as a figment of Frasier's imagination, and once as the actual Diane in the crossover episode "The Show Where Diane Comes Back".

Other actresses auditioned for the role of Diane Chambers. Producers decided to give Long the role primarily for her scenes with Ted Danson as Sam. For her performance as Diane, Long won an Emmy Award in 1983 for an Outstanding Lead Actress in a Comedy Series and two Golden Globe Awards in 1983 and 1985 for Best Supporting Actress in a Series, Miniseries or Television Film and Best Actress in a Musical or Comedy Television Series, respectively.

== Role ==
Diane Chambers premiered in Cheers in 1982 as a former teaching assistant and graduate student who works as a cocktail waitress. In the 1982 series pilot "Give Me a Ring Sometime", Diane arrived with her fiancé Professor Sumner Sloane (Michael McGuire). When he abandoned Diane at Cheers, she realized that he would not return and took a job as a waitress at Cheers. Her mother Helen (Glynis Johns) appeared in one episode, "Someone Single, Someone Blue" (1983), and the narrative indicated that her father, Spencer, had died. Diane was said to have attended Bennington College and pursued graduate studies at Boston University. She was known for intellectually-minded, long-winded commentaries and academic interests (particularly poetry, psychology) which created tensions with her co-workers and in the bar culture, opening up many comedic possibilities.

Diane had on-and-off relationships with womanizing bartender Sam Malone, a former professional athlete and a foil to her intellectual persona. When Sam and Diane ended one of their relationships at the end of the second season, Diane went to a psychiatric hospital in the following season and met psychiatrist Frasier Crane, and the two set off to marry in Europe at the end of that season. The fourth season opened as Diane jilted Frasier at the wedding altar. In the fifth season, after Sam ended his relationship with politician Janet Eldridge (Kate Mulgrew), Sam proposed to Diane, who repeatedly rejected his proposals until she finally agreed in "Chambers vs. Malone" (1987). In the season finale, "I Do, Adieu" (1987), Diane was offered the chance to fulfill her dream of becoming a writer, causing Sam and Diane to halt their wedding. Diane left Boston, promising Sam that she would return in six months. Six years later, in the series finale "One for the Road" (1993), Diane returned as an award-winning cable television writer. They tried to rekindle their romance and planned to leave Boston together for Los Angeles. However, they reconsidered their relationship and then amicably broke it off. Diane returned to Los Angeles without Sam.

Diane appeared three times in the Cheers spin-off, Frasier. She appeared as a dream figure from Frasier's mind in "Adventures In Paradise (Part 2)" (1994) and later again in "Don Juan In Hell" (2001). Diane visited Seattle in "The Show Where Diane Comes Back" (1996). In Los Angeles, she lost her job by accidentally setting Jane Seymour's hair on fire on the set of Dr. Quinn Medicine Woman. She also lost her friends, boyfriend, beach house, and financial support for her upcoming play, and traveled to Seattle to ask Frasier for help. During a rehearsal of her play—inspired by her experiences at Cheers—Frasier became verbally angry with Diane's rose-tinted portrayal of herself and her inaccurate depiction of him. After the rehearsal, Diane reconciled with Frasier about abandoning him in Europe and then decided to postpone the play and to move back to Los Angeles.

== Development ==
=== Creation and casting ===
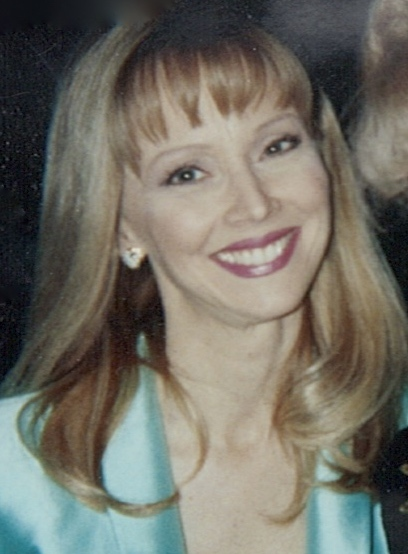
Long at the 1996 Cable ACE Awards

According to Shelley Long, Diane looks more intelligent than she really is. She uses books and academics to communicate with others, usually unsuccessfully. After a series of events which bring her scorn and ridicule, Diane realizes that she knows little about the real world and the bar, and must learn about the world without using books.

Wendie Malick auditioned for the role of Diane; she later appeared in Frasier as Ronny Lawrence. Bess Armstrong was offered a role, but she turned it down. Long was initially reluctant to audition, expecting to be offered the role straight out. The producers took a meeting with her and were able to coax her into reading for the part; according to Glen Charles when Long read "that was it, we knew that we wanted her."

Before the final decision was made, the list of actresses was narrowed down to three: Long, Lisa Eichhorn, and Julia Duffy. The three actresses were paired with the three finalists for the role of Sam (Long was paired with Ted Danson), and each pair auditioned in front of the producers and NBC executives. The NBC executives praised the test scenes between Long and Danson, so the creators chose Long. Julia Duffy later appeared as one of Diane's friends in "Any Friend of Diane's", a 1982 episode of Cheers.

Diane is full of gumption and chutzpah, but quite frequently, she doesn't have the vaguest idea [about] what's going on. However, the producers are cooperative, [and] they have agreed Diane will change. One of my fears of television is 'Do I want to play the same character seven, eight, maybe 10 years?' But it wouldn't be that bad because Diane has a lot of room to grow and still be funny. It's because she cares so deeply.

— Shelley Long, Rome News-Tribune

When the character was conceived, Diane was to be an executive businesswoman who would have a "love-hate" relationship with ex-baseball player Sam Malone (Ted Danson); their relationship was inspired by the romantic movies of Spencer Tracy and Katharine Hepburn. Instead, she became a pretentious graduate student. When Long left the series in 1987, the producers reverted to the original concept for Diane to use with Diane's replacement Rebecca Howe (Kirstie Alley).

=== Off-screen pregnancy ===
In mid-1984, Shelley Long was married to stockbroker Bruce Tyson and was pregnant with their child. The press speculated that the storyline of Diane's love child would have either Sam or Frasier as its father. However, the producers found the pregnancy idea undesirable and scrapped it. Instead, Diane became without child, and scenes of Diane and Frasier in Europe were filmed before Long's pregnancy manifested. During the third season, Long was filmed from either above her waist or standing behind the bar to disguise her pregnancy. In March 1985, she gave birth to a baby girl. Les Charles said that he felt, if her character was pregnant with Sam's child and did not marry Sam, she would be seen as unsympathetic, and he did not want the character to marry Sam because it would change the show into a domestic comedy. Nevertheless, Rhea Perlman's Cheers character Carla Tortelli would conceive children out-of-wedlock on two occasions in the show's first three seasons, including a third season pregnancy with a man who both declined to marry and was not previously married to. (Note: season 1, episode 15, Father Knows Last) (Note: Season 3, episode 13, Whodunit?)

=== Departure ===
In December 1986, Long decided to leave Cheers for a movie career and family; she said that she and Danson had "done some really terrific work at Cheers". Her decision was so surprising that it became national news and greatly worried the show's cast and crew, who believed that the Sam-Diane relationship was fundamental to Cheers' success.

Glen Charles, Jim Burrows, and Les Charles did not decide on a storyline script regarding how Shelly Long's character would make her final exit from the sitcom or the reason for Diane's exit until one week before the season finale. Three different scenarios were discussed and debated. All were rejected. They decided that Sam and Diane would not get married and then break up. Diane would not give birth to Sam's child for him to raise alone. And Diane would not just disappear without a reasonable storyline.

In February 1987, the creators decided to find a female lead replacement who did not resemble Shelley Long. During production of "I Do, Adieu," the producers developed ideas to separate Sam and Diane. Many ideas of writing out Diane were attempted, but they decided she would leave Boston for a writing career. James Burrows said they intended Cheers to be a comedy about comedy set in the bar, but the "Sam and Diane" romance dominated the show for five years and would have made the bar a minor role and less relevant if Long had not left the show in 1987. When Long decided to leave Cheers, producers made plans to revise the show without losing its initial premise; they credited Long's departure for saving the series from cancellation. Long said:

I've never regretted leaving, quite honestly ... I didn't always know what to do with myself, though. When you've been that busy for so long with the show that's so demanding on your time, energy, and concentration on Cheers, the rhythms of your life change totally when you let it go.

— Shelley Long, Los Angeles Daily News, April 1993

Long's replacement Kirstie Alley debuted as businesswoman Rebecca Howe in the sixth season and became a main cast member thereafter.

Before her appearance in the series finale, Shelley Long appeared as herself in the special 200th episode in 1990, which was hosted by John McLaughlin and other cast members. Long's return was rumored in 1989, but a spokesperson for Paramount Television dismissed these rumors.

== Reception ==
Shelley Long received one Emmy in 1983 and two Golden Globes for her performance as Diane Chambers in the series Cheers, categorized as a Best Supporting Actress (Series, Miniseries or Television Film) in 1983 and a Best Actress (Television Series Musical or Comedy). Long was nominated as Outstanding Guest Actress in a Comedy Series for the series finale "One for the Road" in 1993.

In 1990, Robert Bianco praised Diane and Shelley Long for making the show a "classic", and was devastated when she left the show, along with Nicholas Colasanto's death. In 1993, John Carman from San Francisco Chronicle said Long's guest appearance in the series finale was neither well-performed nor well-aged. In 1999, Diane was rated number 33 on TV Guide's 50 Greatest TV Characters list. In 2011, Kim Potts from The Huffington Post ranked her 30th in his list of 100 "Greatest TV Women" of all-time.

According to a telephone survey of 1,011 people conducted by the Times Mirror Center for the People and the Press (now Pew Research Center) on April 1–4, 1993, Sam Malone was the favorite Cheers character of 26%, Diane Chambers was favored by 4%, Rebecca Howe was favored by 6%, and Frasier Crane was favored by 1%. The survey also asked whom Sam should marry; 21% voted Diane Chambers, 19% voted Rebecca Howe, 48% voted Sam to stay single, and 12% had no opinion on this matter.

== Notes ==
Primary sources

From Cheers:

Non-primary sources

=== References ===
- Hecht, Jennifer Michael. The Happiness Myth: Why What We Think is Right is Wrong: A History of What Really Makes Us Happy. New York: HarperCollins, 2007. ISBN 978-0-06-081397-0.
