= Ken Levine (screenwriter) =

American screenwriter

Kenneth Levine (/lɪˈvaɪn/ liv-EYEN) is an American screenwriter, director, producer, and author. Levine has worked on a number of television series, including M*A*S*H, Cheers (for which he shared Outstanding Comedy Series honors at the 35th Primetime Emmy Awards), Frasier, The Simpsons, Wings, Everybody Loves Raymond, Becker and Dharma and Greg. Along with his writing partner David Isaacs, he created the series Almost Perfect.

Levine was also the co-writer of the feature films Volunteers and Mannequin Two: On the Move.

Levine has also been a radio and TV play-by-play commentator for Major League Baseball games, having worked with the Baltimore Orioles (1991), Seattle Mariners (1992–94, 2011–12), and San Diego Padres (1995–96). From 2008 to 2010, he co-hosted the KABC Dodger Talk radio call-in program after every Los Angeles Dodgers game, as well as the station's weekly Sunday Night Sports Final program. During his second stint with the Mariners, he returned to help fill in for the deceased Dave Niehaus.

Levine grew up in Woodland Hills, CA, graduating from Parkman Junior High and William Howard Taft Charter High School. He attended the University of California, Los Angeles, graduating in 1972.

== Other work ==
For several years in the 1970s, Levine was a disc jockey using the air name "Beaver Cleaver" on several West Coast Top 40 radio stations including KYA San Francisco, KFMB-FM San Diego, and KTNQ, KIQQ and KHTZ Los Angeles.

Levine has written several books on television, travel and growing up in the 1960s.

From 2005 to 2022 he ran the blog By Ken Levine, which was rated one of The Best 25 Blogs of 2011 by Time magazine. While Levine's blog spans many of his personal interests (including sports), a core focus of the content is about TV shows, writing for TV, and questions and answers about the various shows where Levine was part of the writing team.

A 2014 blog post paying tribute to playwright Neil Simon led to Levine providing on-camera introductions to 17 movies written by Simon on the Turner Classic Movies cable television channel on Friday nights in January 2015.

Currently, Levine is a contributing cartoonist to the New Yorker magazine.

=== Comments about Roseanne Barr ===
In what the Los Angeles Times called an epic "Blog Fight!" that took place in 2011, Levine responded to an assertion in New York Magazine by Roseanne Barr that her sitcom Roseanne was doomed due to sexism and her lack of creative control. Levine said: "...Roseanne is a monster. No amount of spinning on her part is going to change that. No amount of 'woe is me', 'no one understands me', 'I'm the only one who cares' laments are going to change the fact that she treated people like shit. Routinely. Constantly. Knowingly".

Barr responded with an obscenity-laced rejoinder which included this challenge: "I am pretty sure that women who have worked for you in the past (if indeed there were ANY) worked in a hostile work environment. Let me know, women writers out there—how were you treated on Ken Levine’s staff?" Levine posted an answer from Almost Perfect co-creator Robin Schiff: "There are many sexist guys in the business, but Ken Levine is not one of them. The most sexist thing he ever did was blather on about baseball with the other men in the room despite the fact that I was visibly bored. Hardly grounds for a lynching".

But Schiff did offer: "I totally agree with Roseanne that there is rampant sexism in the industry. A couple of weeks ago, the WGAw released its executive summary finding that (in addition to dismal stats for ethnically diverse or older writers), women comprise only 28% of working writers. We still make less money than men. All you have to do is look at the writers onstage accepting Emmys for late night talk shows and sitcoms to see that women comedy writers are on the endangered list".

== Podcast ==
In 2017, Levine launched a weekly podcast, Hollywood & Levine, covering subjects similar to his blog, along with occasional interviews. He later ended the podcast, releasing its final episode on August 8, 2024.

== The Simpsons episodes ==
- "Dancin' Homer" (season two)
- "Saturdays of Thunder" (season three)

== M*A*S*H episodes ==
- "Out of Sight, Out of Mind" (season five)
- "The Most Unforgettable Characters" (season five)
- "Post Op" (season five)
- "The M*A*S*H Olympics" (season six)
- "The Merchant of Korea" (season six)
- "Patient 4077" (season six)
- "Dr. Winchester and Mr. Hyde" (season six)
- "Peace on Us" (season seven)
- "Our Finest Hour" (season seven)
- "The Billfold Syndrome" (season seven)
- "None Like it Hot" (season seven)
- "They Call the Wind Korea" (season seven)
- "Point of View" (season seven)
- "A Night at Rosie's" (season seven)
- "Ain't Love Grand" (season seven)
- "Good-Bye Radar: Part 1" (season eight)
- "Good-Bye Radar: Part 2" (season eight)

== Awards and nominations ==
- 1979 – Nominated: Emmy Award for Outstanding Writing in a Comedy or Comedy-Variety or Music Series: M*A*S*H: "Point of View" (with David Isaacs)
- 1979 – Nominated: Humanitas Prize for 30 Minute Network or Syndicated Television: M*A*S*H: "Point of View" (with David Isaacs)
- 1979 – Nominated: Writers Guild of America Award for Episodic Comedy: M*A*S*H: "Point of View" (with David Isaacs)
- 1980 – Nominated: Emmy Award for Outstanding Writing in a Comedy Series: M*A*S*H: "Good Bye, Radar, Part II" (with David Isaacs)
- 1980 – Nominated: Writers Guild of America Award for Episodic Comedy: M*A*S*H: "Good Bye, Radar, Part I and Part II" (with David Isaacs)
- 1983 – Won: Emmy Award for Outstanding Comedy Series: Cheers (with James Burrows, Glen and Les Charles and David Isaacs)
- 1983 – Nominated: Emmy Award for Outstanding Writing in a Comedy Series: Cheers: "The Boys In The Bar" (with David Isaacs)
- 1983 – Nominated: Writers Guild of America Award for Episodic Comedy: Open All Night: "Terry Runs Away" (with David Isaacs)
- 1984 – Won: Writers Guild of America Award for Episodic Comedy: Cheers: "The Boys In The Bar" (with David Isaacs) (Tied with Glen and Les Charles for the Cheers pilot, "Give Me a Ring Sometime")
- 1988 – Nominated: Writers Guild of America Award for Episodic Comedy: Cheers: "Never Love a Goalie - Part I" (with David Isaacs)
- 1990 – Nominated: Emmy Award for Outstanding Writing in a Comedy Series: Cheers: "Death Takes a Holiday on Ice" (with David Isaacs)
- 1990 – Nominated: Writers Guild of America Award for Episodic Comedy: Cheers: "Jumping Jerks" (with David Isaacs)
- 1992 – Won: Writers Guild of America Award for Episodic Comedy: Cheers: "Rat Girl" (with David Isaacs)
- 1994 – Nominated: Emmy Award for Outstanding Individual Achievement in Writing in a Comedy Series: Frasier: "The Show Where Lilith Comes Back" (with David Isaacs)

== Books ==
- It's Gone...No, Wait A Minute..., a diary of his season broadcasting with the Baltimore Orioles (1991), released in 1993.
- Where the Hell Am I?: Trips I Have Survived,, a 2011 collection of travelogues he had originally started writing for friends and family.
- The Me Generation... By Me (Growing Up in the '60s), a 2012 memoir
- Must Kill TV, a 2013 satirical novel

== Plays ==
- The ‘60s Project (2006 musical, conceived by co-writer Janet Brenner)
- Upfronts & Personal (2007)
- A or B? (2014)
- Going... Going... Gone! (2016)
- Our Time (2017)
- Fifteen Seconds (2018) Full Season Announcement - Short+Sweet Illawarra 2018 | Short + Sweet
- What Is Murder? (2022)
