= David Isaacs (writer) =

American screenwriter and producer (born 1949)

David Alan Isaacs
- Born: October 16, 1949 (age 76); New York City, U.S.
- Occupations: Writer; Television producer
- Writing career
- Period: 1975–present
- Notable works: M*A*S*H, Cheers, Frasier, Mad Men

David Alan Isaacs (born October 16, 1949) is an American screenwriter and producer. He has written episodes of M*A*S*H, Cheers, its spin-off Frasier, and The Simpsons with Ken Levine.

Isaacs became a consulting producer and writer for the AMC television drama Mad Men for the show's second season. He won the Writers Guild of America Award for Best Dramatic Series at the February 2009 ceremony for his work on the second season.

He is currently a professor and chair of the writing division at the University of Southern California in Los Angeles, where he teaches comedy and screenwriting.
