= List of awards and nominations received by Frasier =

List of awards won by Frasier
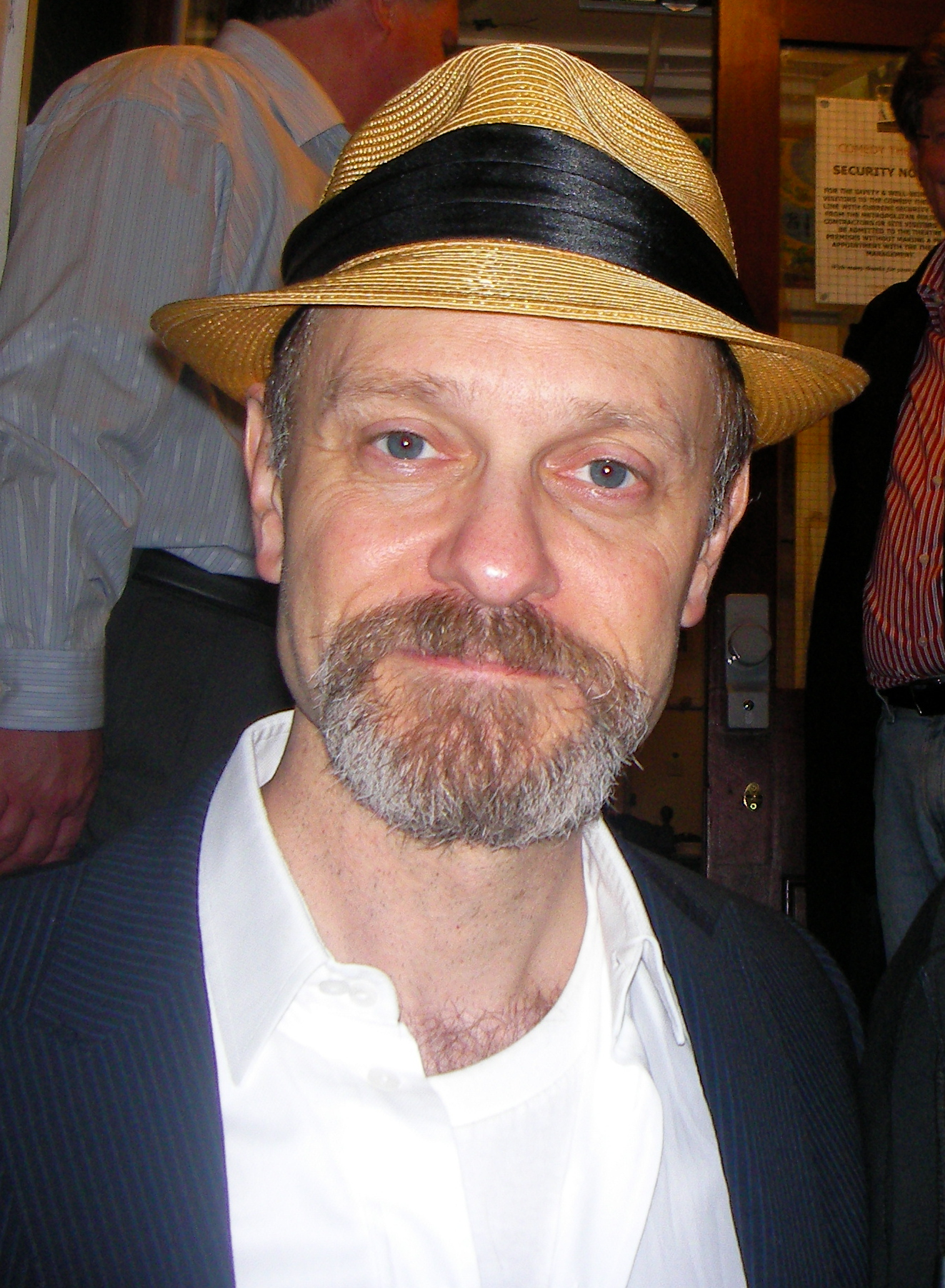
- David Hyde Pierce received numerous awards and nominations for his performance as the titular character's brother, Niles Crane.
Awards and nominations
Award	Won	Nominated
American Cinema Editors Awards	3	7
American Comedy Awards	9	16
Angel Awards	0	1
Art Directors Guild	0	2
Artios Awards	5	12
BMI Film & TV Awards	11	11
British Comedy Awards	1	1
Directors Guild of America Awards	2	9
Emmy Awards	37	108
GLAAD Media Awards	1	1
Golden Globe Awards	2	24
Humanitas Prize	2	6
NAACP Image Awards	0	2
Peabody Award	1	1
People's Choice Awards	2	2
Producers Guild of America Awards	1	3
Satellite Awards	3	15
Screen Actors Guild Awards	2	26
TCA Awards	5	11
TV Guide Award	3	10
TV Land Award	0	3
Q Awards	13	35
Writers Guild of America Award	6	9
Young Artist Award	0	1
- Total number of wins and nominations
Totals	112	318
- References

Frasier is an American television sitcom created by David Angell, Peter Casey, and David Lee as a spinoff of the 1980s sitcom Cheers. The series revolves around the titular character Frasier Crane, a psychiatrist who returns to his hometown to start a new life for himself. The series stars Kelsey Grammer in role of the main character, as well as Jane Leeves, David Hyde Pierce, Peri Gilpin and John Mahoney.

Frasier aired on NBC from September 16, 1993 to May 13, 2004, broadcasting 264 episodes over eleven seasons during its initial run. During the series' run, the show received critical acclaim for its writing and humor. The series amassed 318 nominations for a variety of industry awards, including 108 Emmy awards (with 37 wins), 24 Golden Globe Awards (with two wins), 26 Screen Actors Guild Awards (with 2 wins), 11 TCA Awards (with five wins), 9 Writers Guild of America awards (with six wins), and 9 Directors Guild of America awards (with two wins).

In addition to the awards for the series, several individual cast members received acclaim for their performance on the series. Pierce stands as the most decorated cast member on the series, winning 4 Emmy awards, 5 Q Awards, 2 TCA awards, 2 SAG awards and 6 American Comedy awards. Grammer also won 4 Emmy Awards, 4 Q awards, 2 Golden Globes, 2 Satellite awards, 2 American Comedy Awards and a SAG award. Several other actors and crew members in the series received many awards and nominations, including Leeves, Mahoney, and the creators of the show.

== Awards and nominations ==
=== ACE Eddie Awards ===
Receiving seven nominations for an Eddie Award, Frasier won three awards for Best Edited Half Hour Series for Television, all received by television series editor Ron Volk.

Year	Category	Nominee(s)	Episode(s)	Result	Ref
1996	Best Edited Half-Hour Series for Television	Timothy Mozer	for "The Adventures of Bad Boy and Dirty Girl"	Nominated	
1998	Best Edited Half-Hour Series for Television	Ron Volk	for "Perspectives on Christmas"	Won	
1999	Best Edited Half-Hour Series for Television	Ron Volk	for "Room Service"	Won	
2000	Best Edited Half-Hour Series for Television	Ron Volk	for "Three Valentines"	Won	
2001	Best Edited Half-Hour Series for Television	Ron Volk	for "Dark Side of the Moon"	Nominated	
2002	Best Edited Half-Hour Series for Television	Ron Volk	for "Daphne Returns"	Nominated	
2004	Best Edited Half-Hour Series for Television	Ron Volk	for "Rooms with a View"	Nominated	

=== American Comedy Awards ===
Frasier received twenty award nominations for an American Comedy Awards during its tenure. The series won nine—six awards for Funniest Supporting Male Performer in a TV Series awarded to David Hyde Pierce, two for Funniest Male Performer in a TV Series (Leading Role) Network, Cable or Syndication awarded to Kelsey Grammer, and an award for Funniest Television Series.

Year	Category	Nominee(s)	Result	Ref
1994	Funniest Male Performer in a Television Series (Leading Role)	Kelsey Grammer	Nominated	
1995	Funniest Male Performer in a Television Series (Leading Role)	Kelsey Grammer	Won	
1995	Funniest Supporting Male Performer in a Television Series	David Hyde Pierce	Won	
1996	Funniest Male Performer in a Television Series (Leading Role)	Kelsey Grammer	Won	
1996	Funniest Supporting Male Performer in a Television Series	David Hyde Pierce	Won	
1997	Funniest Male Performer in a Television Series (Leading Role)	Kelsey Grammer	Nominated	
1997	Funniest Supporting Male Performer in a Television Series	David Hyde Pierce	Won	
1997	Funniest Male Guest Appearance in a Television Series	Nathan Lane	Nominated	
1998	Funniest Male Performer in a Television Series (Leading Role)	Kelsey Grammer	Nominated	
1998	Funniest Supporting Male Performer in a Television Series	David Hyde Pierce	Won	
1999	Funniest Male Performer in a Television Series (Leading Role)	Kelsey Grammer	Nominated	
1999	Funniest Supporting Male Performer in a Television Series	David Hyde Pierce	Won	
1999	Funniest Female Guest Appearance in a Television Series	Bebe Neuwirth	Nominated	
2000	Funniest Television Series		Won	
2000	Funniest Supporting Male Performer in a Television Series	David Hyde Pierce	Won	
2000	Funniest Female Guest Appearance in a Television Series	Christine Baranski	Nominated	
2000	Funniest Female Guest Appearance in a Television Series	Bebe Neuwirth	Nominated	
2001	Funniest Male Performer in a Television Series (Leading Role)	Kelsey Grammer	Nominated	
2001	Funniest Supporting Male Performer in a Television Series	David Hyde Pierce	Nominated	
2001	Funniest Female Guest Appearance in a Television Series	Jean Smart	Nominated	

=== Artios Awards ===
Frasier received eleven consecutive nominations for Best Casting for TV, Comedy Episodic, one for every season the series was on television, winning five times. The series was also nominated for Best Casting for TV, Pilot.

Year	Category	Nominee(s)	Result	Ref
1994	Outstanding Achievement in Pilot Casting	Jeff Greenberg	Nominated	
1994	Outstanding Achievement in Comedy Episodic Casting	Jeff Greenberg	Won	
1995	Outstanding Achievement in Comedy Episodic Casting	Jeff Greenberg	Won	
1996	Outstanding Achievement in Comedy Episodic Casting	Jeff Greenberg	Won	
1997	Outstanding Achievement in Comedy Episodic Casting	Jeff Greenberg	Won	
1998	Outstanding Achievement in Comedy Episodic Casting	Jeff Greenberg	Nominated	
1999	Outstanding Achievement in Comedy Episodic Casting	Jeff Greenberg	Won	
2000	Outstanding Achievement in Comedy Episodic Casting	Jeff Greenberg	Nominated	
2001	Outstanding Achievement in Comedy Episodic Casting	Jeff Greenberg	Nominated	
2002	Outstanding Achievement in Comedy Episodic Casting	Jeff Greenberg	Nominated	
2003	Outstanding Achievement in Comedy Episodic Casting	Jeff Greenberg	Nominated	
2004	Outstanding Achievement in Comedy Episodic Casting	Jeff Greenberg	Nominated	

=== BMI Film & TV Awards ===
Frasier was recognized eleven times at the BMI Film & TV Awards, with Darryl Phinnessee winning eleven awards and Bruce Miller winning seven.

Year	Category	Nominee(s)	Result	Ref
1994	BMI TV Music Award	Bruce Miller and Darryl Phinnessee (Note: Miller also recognized for Wings)	Won (Note: The award recognizes multiple composers each year.)	
1995	BMI TV Music Award	Bruce Miller and Darryl Phinnessee	Won	
1996	BMI TV Music Award	Bruce Miller and Darryl Phinnessee	Won	
1997	BMI TV Music Award	Bruce Miller and Darryl Phinnessee	Won	
1998	BMI TV Music Award	Bruce Miller and Darryl Phinnessee (Note: Both also recognized for Union Square)	Won	
1999	BMI TV Music Award	Bruce Miller and Darryl Phinnessee (Note: Miller also recognized for Becker)	Won	
2000	BMI TV Music Award	Bruce Miller and Darryl Phinnessee	Won	
2001	BMI TV Music Award	Darryl Phinnessee	Won	
2002	BMI TV Music Award	Darryl Phinnessee	Won	
2003	BMI TV Music Award	Darryl Phinnessee	Won	
2004	BMI TV Music Award	Darryl Phinnessee	Won	

=== Directors Guild of America Awards ===
Presented by the Directors Guild of America since 1938, The Directors Guild of America Award honors excellence in the field of direction. Frasier received nine nominations for the award for Outstanding Directorial Achievement in Comedy Series, three out of nine for work by Pamela Fryman and two of them by David Lee. James Burrows won the award in 1994 while Lee won it in following year.

Year	Category	Nominee(s)	Episodes(s)	Result	Ref
1994	Outstanding Directorial Achievement in Comedy Series	James Burrows (Note: Additional nominees: Bill Carroll (unit production manager); Brian Ellis (first assistant director); Steven Pomeroy (second assistant director); Rick Beren (technical coordinator))	for "The Good Son"	Won	
1995	Outstanding Directorial Achievement in Comedy Series	Rick Beren (Note: Additional nominees: Bill Carroll (unit production manager); Brian Ellis (first assistant director); Katy Garretson (second assistant director); Dan Fendel (technical coordinator))	for "The Unkindest Cut of All"	Nominated	
1995	Outstanding Directorial Achievement in Comedy Series	David Lee (Note: Additional nominees: Bill Carroll (unit production manager); Brian Ellis (first assistant director); Katy Garretson (second assistant director); Rick Beren (technical coordinator))	for "The Matchmaker"	Won	
1996	Outstanding Directorial Achievement in Comedy Series	David Lee (Note: Additional nominees: Bill Carroll (unit production manager); Brian Ellis (first assistant director); Katy Garretson (second assistant director); Jim Rose (technical coordinator))	for "Daphne's Room"	Nominated	
1998	Outstanding Directorial Achievement in Comedy Series	Pamela Fryman (Note: Additional nominees: Bill Carroll (unit production manager); Katy Garretson (first assistant director); Marc Stirdivant (second assistant director); Jim Rose (technical coordinator))	for "Halloween (Part I)"	Nominated	
1999	Outstanding Directorial Achievement in Comedy Series	Kelsey Grammer	for "Merry Christmas, Mrs. Moskowitz"	Nominated	
2000	Outstanding Directorial Achievement in Comedy Series	Pamela Fryman	for "The Fight Before Christmas"	Nominated	
2000	Outstanding Directorial Achievement in Comedy Series	Katy Garretson (Note: Additional nominees: Bill Carroll (unit production manager); Marc Stirdivant (first assistant director); Jerri Churchill (second assistant director); Jim Rose (technical coordinator))	for "Dr. Nora"	Nominated	
2001	Outstanding Directorial Achievement in Comedy Series	Pamela Fryman	for "And the Dish Ran Away with the Spoon (Parts 1 & 2)"	Nominated	

=== Emmy Awards ===
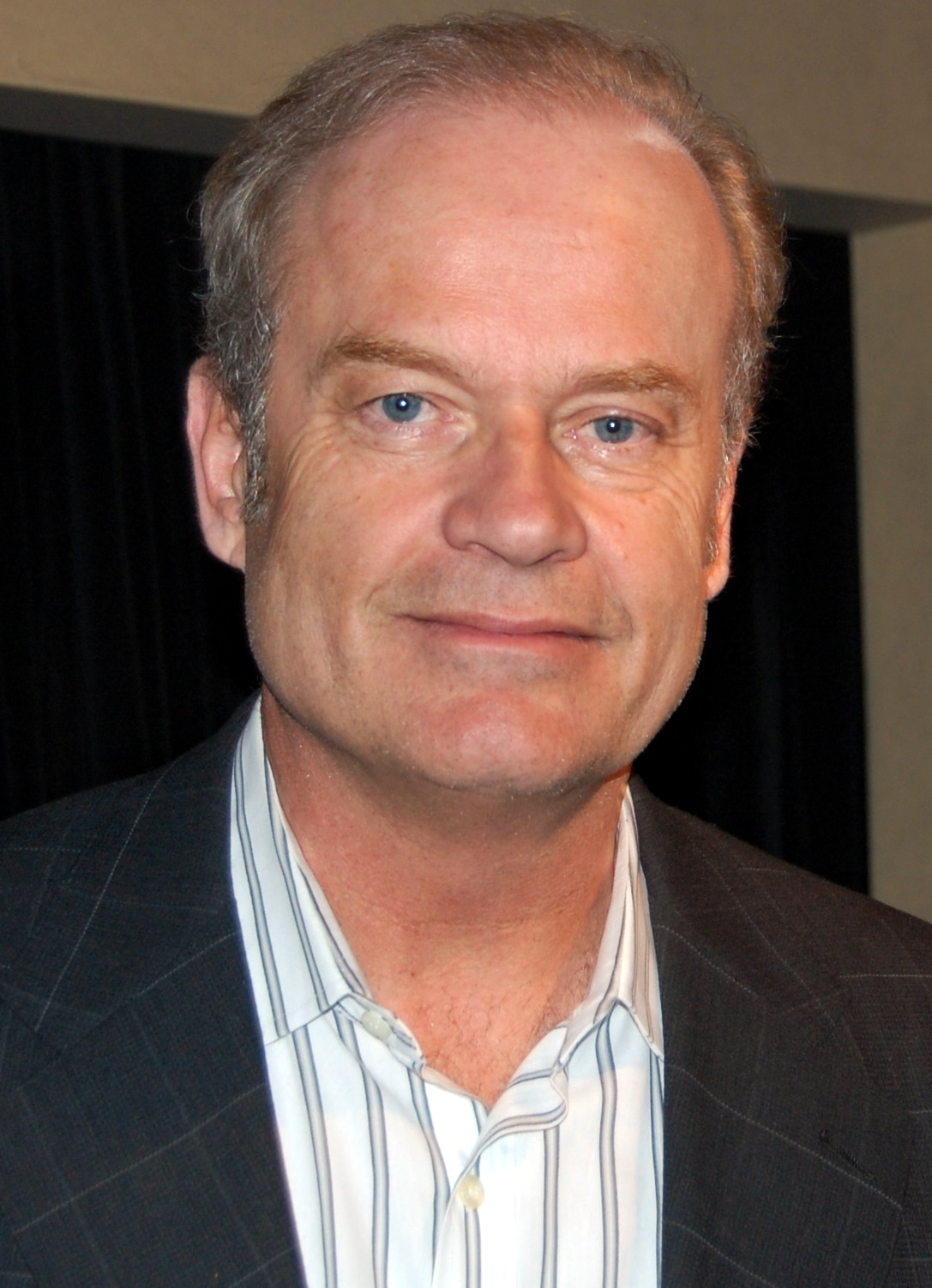
Kelsey Grammer won four Emmy awards for his performance as Frasier Crane on the series

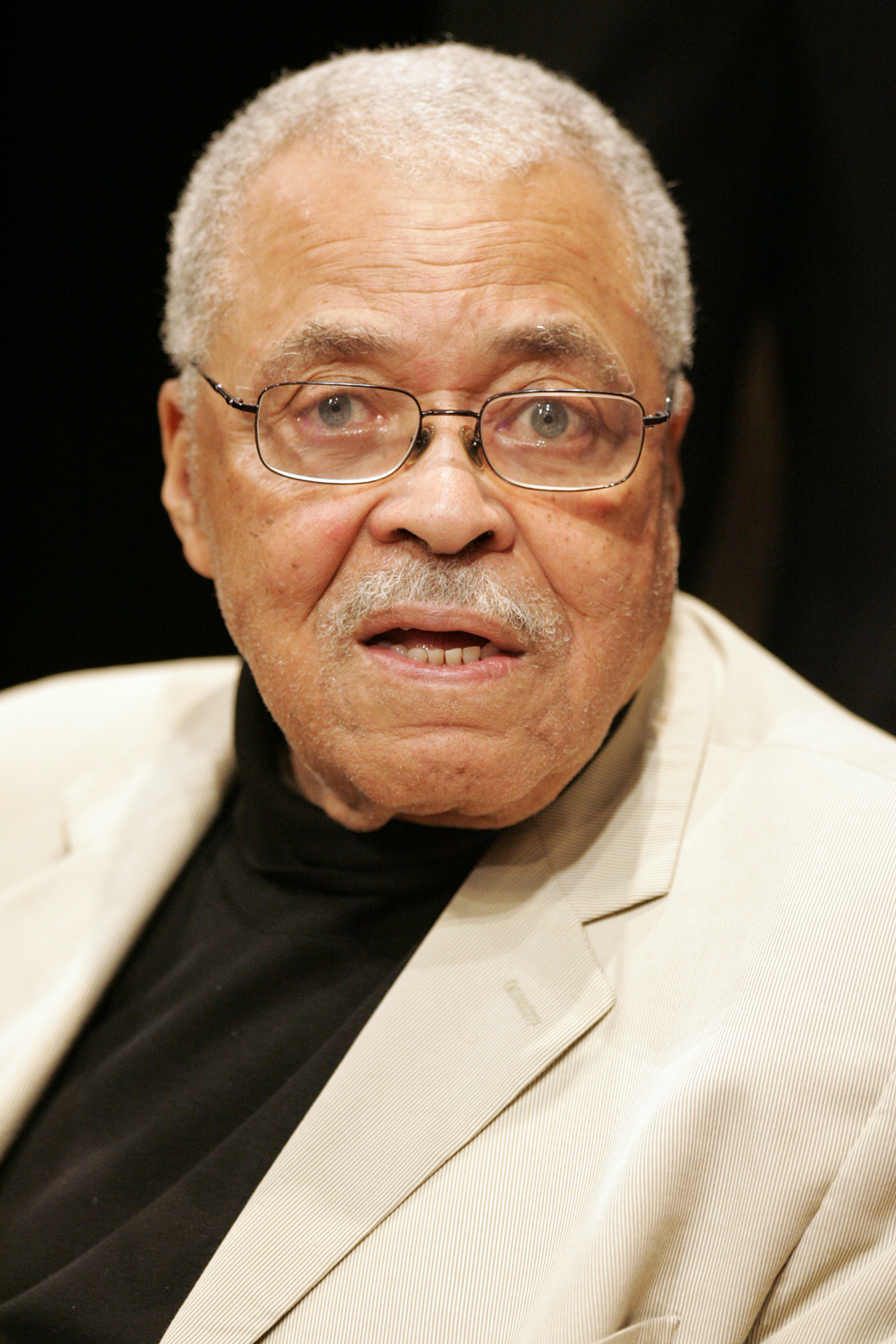
James Earl Jones received an Emmy nomination for his guest appearance on the series

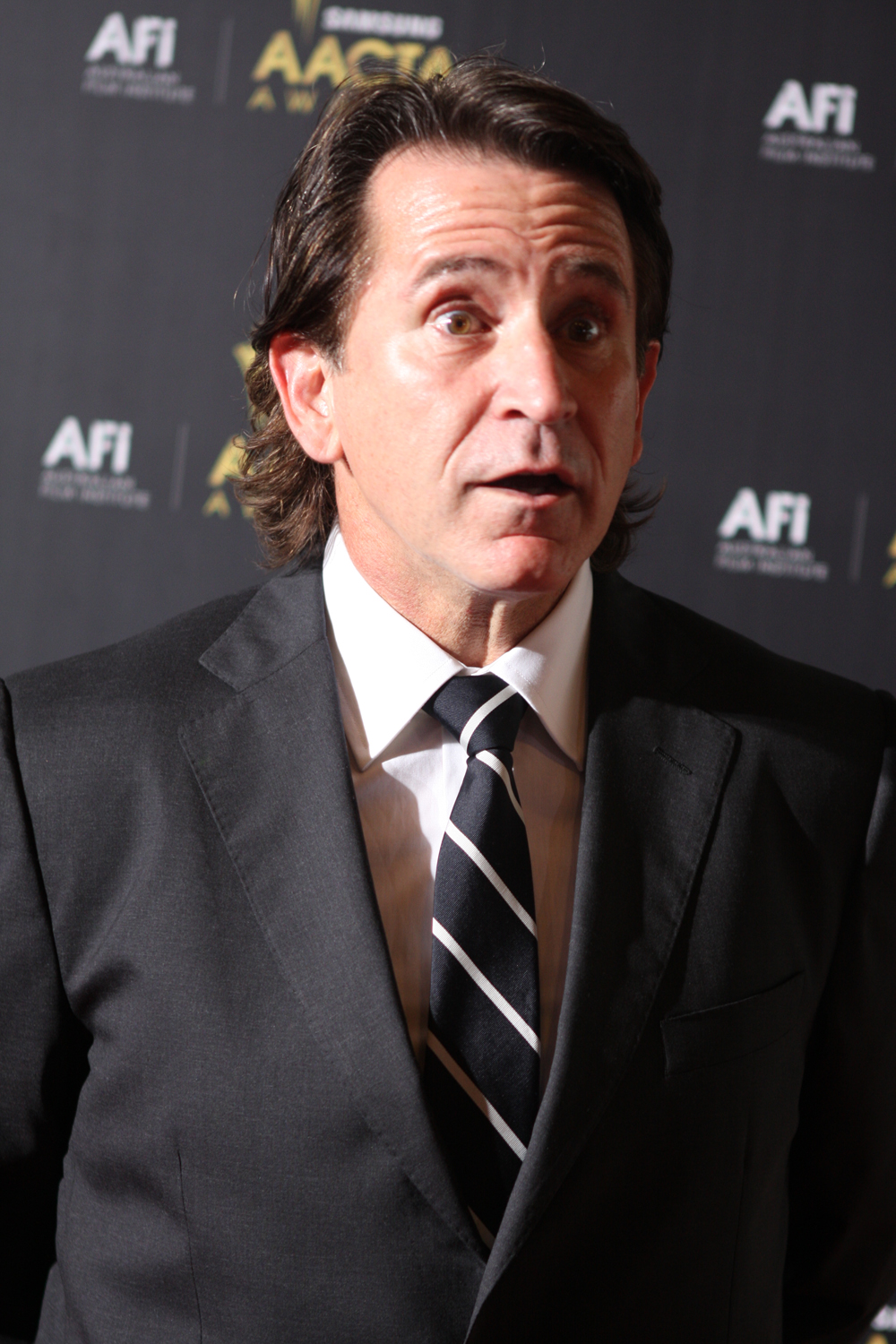
Anthony LaPaglia received an Emmy award and two nominations for his role as Daphne's brother, Simon

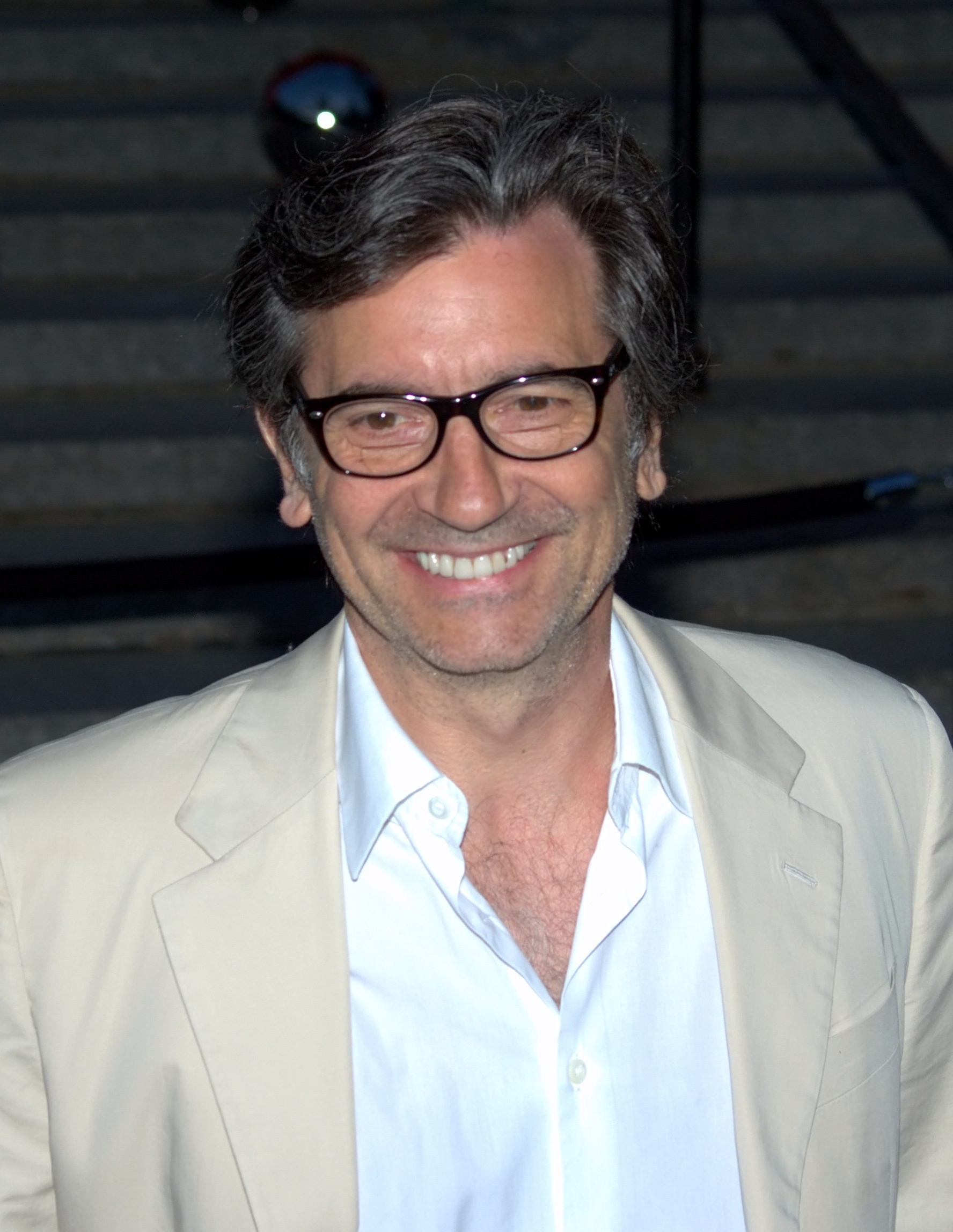
Griffin Dunne received an Emmy nomination for his guest performance on the series

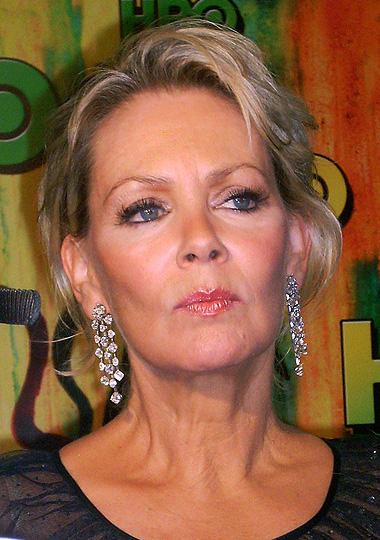
Jean Smart won two Emmy awards for her guest appearances as Lorna Lenley and Lana Gardner

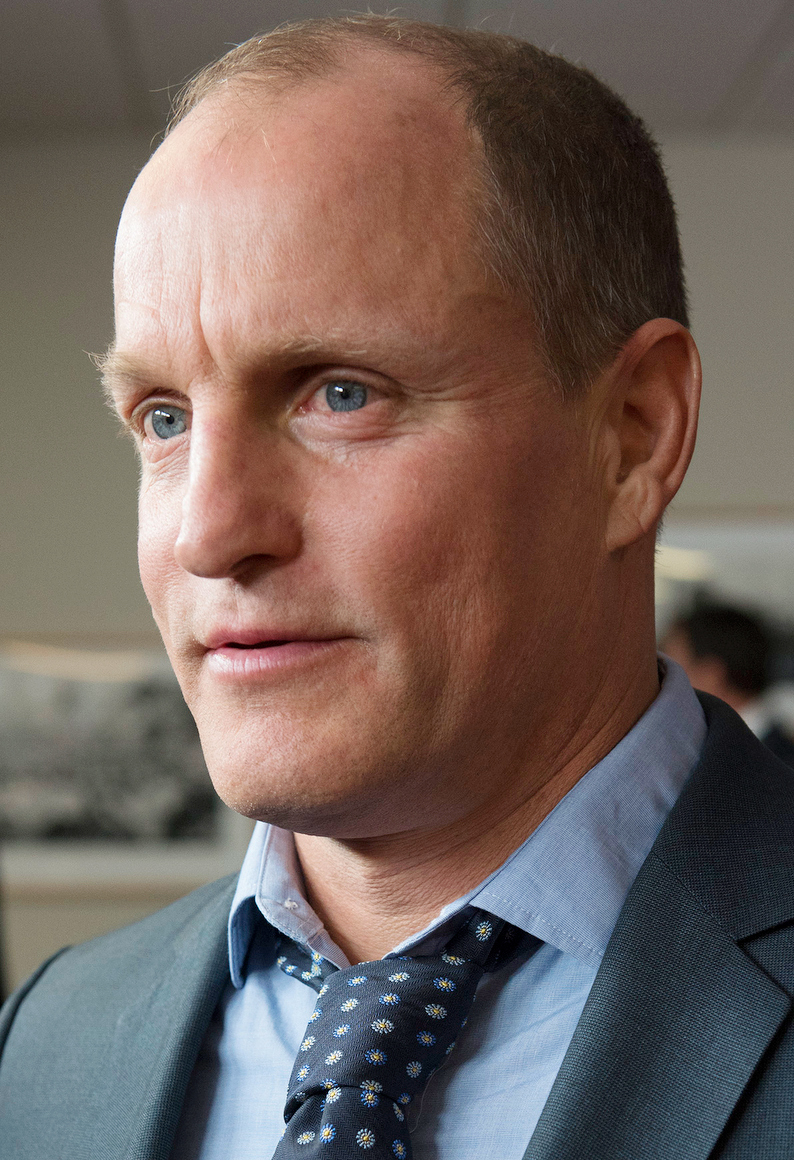
Woody Harrelson received an Emmy nomination for his guest role reprising his character from Cheers

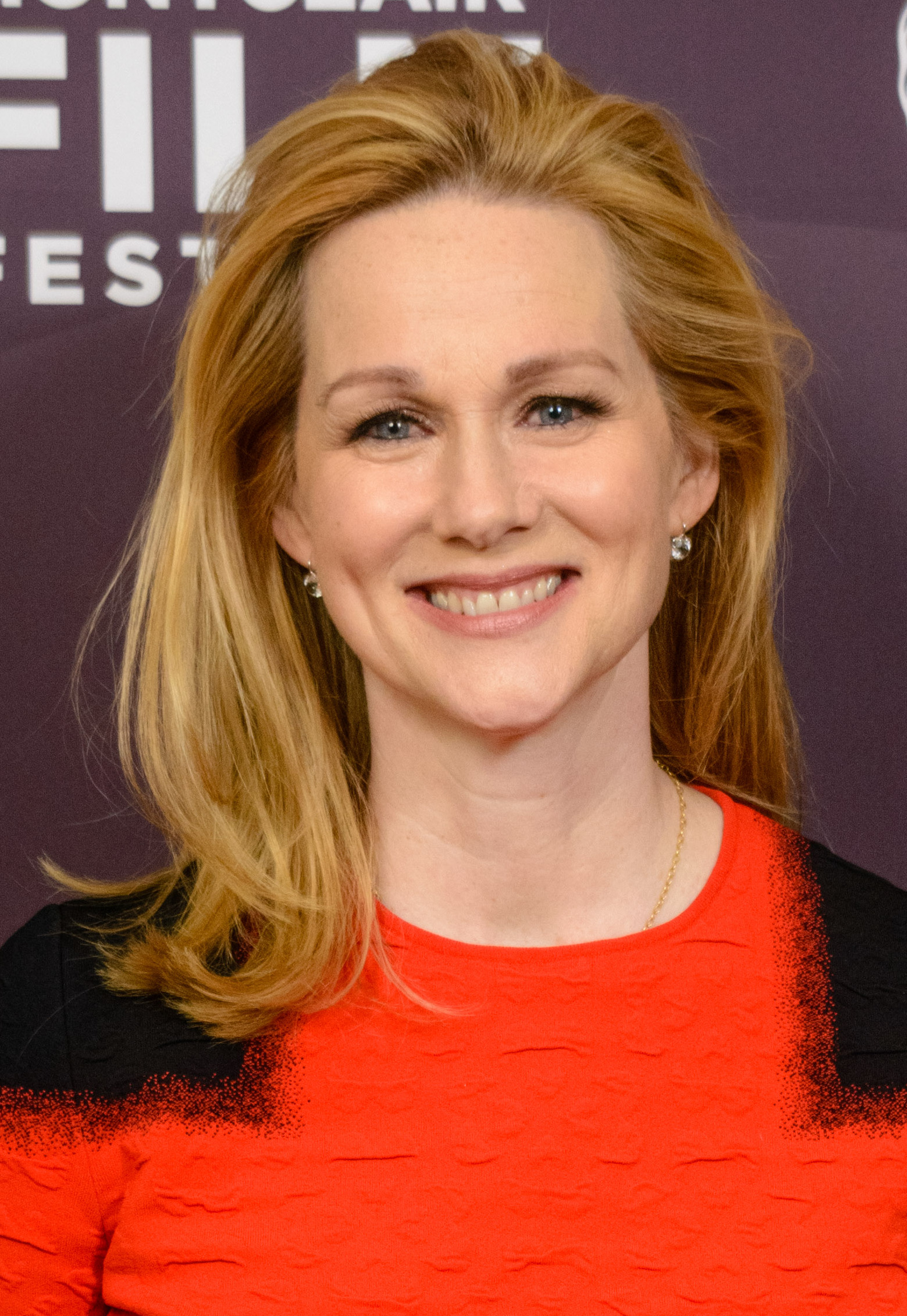
Laura Linney won an Emmy award for her performance as Frasier's final girlfriend, Charlotte Connor

Frasier received 108 Primetime Emmy Award nominations, with 37 wins. It passed The Mary Tyler Moore Show in 2002 to set the record for the most wins for a scripted series, a record it would hold until being surpassed by Game of Thrones in 2016. The series received eight nominations for the award for Outstanding Comedy Series and won the category a record-breaking five times from 1994 to 1998. Kelsey Grammer won the award for Outstanding Lead Actor in a Comedy Series four times in 1994, 1995, 1998 and 2004. The series received thirteen nominations for Outstanding Supporting Actor in a Comedy Series, with David Hyde Pierce winning the award four times in 1995, 1998, 1999 and 2004. John Mahoney was nominated twice in 1999 and 2003. Frasier also received a number of nominations for guest performances, including several Cheers alumni. Among the winners were Jean Smart, who won the award for Outstanding Guest Actress in a Comedy Series twice, Laura Linney, who won in 2004 for her portrayal of Charlotte Connor, Derek Jacobi, who won the award for Outstanding Guest Actor in a Comedy Series, and Anthony LaPaglia, winning in 2002, and received two nominations for Outstanding Guest Actor in a Comedy Series. The series received 36 nominations for Creative Arts Emmy Awards. Television editor Ron Volk won eight awards for Outstanding Multi-Camera Picture Editing for a Series. Dana Mark McClure, Thomas J. Huth and Robert Douglass won two awards for Outstanding Multi-Camera Sound Mixing for a Series or a Special.

==== Primetime Emmy Awards ====
Year	Category	Nominee(s)	Episodes(s)	Result	Ref
1994	Outstanding Comedy Series	Peter Casey, David Angell, David Lee, Christopher Lloyd, Denise Moss, Sy Dukane, Maggie Blanc, Linda Morris, Vic Rauseo		Won	
1994	Outstanding Lead Actor in a Comedy Series	Kelsey Grammer as Frasier Crane	for "The Good Son"	Won	
1994	Outstanding Supporting Actor in a Comedy Series	David Hyde Pierce as Dr. Niles Crane	for "A Mid-Winter Night’s Dream" + "Author, Author"	Nominated	
1994	Outstanding Individual Achievement in Directing in a Comedy Series	James Burrows	for "The Good Son"	Won	
1994	Outstanding Individual Achievement in Writing in a Comedy Series	David Angell, Peter Casey, and David Lee	for "The Good Son"	Won	
1994	Outstanding Individual Achievement in Writing in a Comedy Series	Ken Levine and David Isaacs	for "The Show Where Lilith Comes Back"	Nominated	
1995	Outstanding Comedy Series	Peter Casey, David Angell, David Lee, Christopher Lloyd, Vic Rauseo, Linda Morris, Maggie Blanc, David Pollock, Elias Davis, Chuck Ranberg, Anne Flett-Giordano, and Joe Keenan		Won	
1995	Outstanding Lead Actor in a Comedy Series	Kelsey Grammer as Frasier Crane	for "Adventures in Paradise", Part 2	Won	
1995	Outstanding Supporting Actor in a Comedy Series	David Hyde Pierce as Dr. Niles Crane	for "Flour Child" + "An Affair to Forget"	Won	
1995	Outstanding Individual Achievement in Directing in a Comedy Series	David Lee	for "The Matchmaker"	Won	
1995	Outstanding Individual Achievement in Writing in a Comedy Series	Joe Keenan	for "The Matchmaker"	Nominated	
1995	Outstanding Individual Achievement in Writing in a Comedy Series	Chuck Ranberg and Anne Flett-Giordano	for "An Affair to Forget"	Won	
1996	Outstanding Comedy Series	Peter Casey, David Angell, David Lee, Christopher Lloyd, Vic Rauseo, Linda Morris, Steven Levitan, Maggie Blanc, Chuck Ranberg, Anne Flett-Giordano, Joe Keenan, Jack Burditt and Mary Fukuto		Won	
1996	Outstanding Lead Actor in a Comedy Series	Kelsey Grammer as Frasier Crane	for "You Can Go Home Again"	Nominated	
1996	Outstanding Supporting Actor in a Comedy Series	David Hyde Pierce as Dr. Niles Crane	for "The Last Time I Saw Maris" + "Moon Dance"	Nominated	
1996	Outstanding Individual Achievement in Writing in a Comedy Series	Joe Keenan, Christopher Lloyd, Rob Greenberg, Jack Burditt, Chuck Ranberg, Anne Flett-Giordano, Linda Morris, Vic Rauseo	for "Moon Dance"	Won	
1997	Outstanding Comedy Series	David Angell, Peter Casey, David Lee, Christopher Lloyd, Chuck Ranberg, Anne Flett-Giordano, Joe Keenan, Michael B. Kaplan, Maggie Blanc, William Lucas Walker, Suzanne Martin, Rob Greenberg, Mary Fukuto		Won	
1997	Outstanding Lead Actor in a Comedy Series	Kelsey Grammer as Frasier Crane	for "Ham Radio"	Nominated	
1997	Outstanding Supporting Actor in a Comedy Series	David Hyde Pierce as Dr. Niles Crane	for "Mixed Doubles" + "Daphne Hates Sherry"	Nominated	
1997	Outstanding Directing for a Comedy Series	David Lee	for "To Kill a Talking Bird"	Won	
1998	Outstanding Comedy Series	David Angell, Peter Casey, David Lee, Christopher Lloyd, Joe Keenan, Jay Kogen, Jeffrey Richman, Maggie Blanc, Suzanne Martin, Rob Greenberg, David Lloyd, Mary Fukuto, Lori Kirkland Baker		Won	
1998	Outstanding Lead Actor in a Comedy Series	Kelsey Grammer as Frasier Crane	for "Frasier’s Imaginary Friend"	Won	
1998	Outstanding Supporting Actor in a Comedy Series	David Hyde Pierce as Dr. Niles Crane	for "The Maris Counselor" + "First Date"	Won	
1998	Outstanding Supporting Actress in a Comedy Series	Jane Leeves as Daphne Moon	for "Where Every Bloke Knows Your Name" + "First Date"	Nominated	
1998	Outstanding Writing for a Comedy Series	Joe Keenan	for "The Ski Lodge"	Nominated	
1999	Outstanding Comedy Series	Peter Casey, David Angell, David Lee, Christopher Lloyd, Kelsey Grammer, Joe Keenan, Jay Kogen, Jeffrey Richman, Rob Greenberg, Janis Hirsch, Maggie Blanc, David Lloyd		Nominated	
1999	Outstanding Lead Actor in a Comedy Series	Kelsey Grammer as Frasier Crane	for "Merry Christmas, Mrs. Moskowitz"	Nominated	
1999	Outstanding Supporting Actor in a Comedy Series	John Mahoney as Martin Crane	for "Merry Christmas, Mrs. Moskowitz" + "Our Parents, Ourselves"	Nominated	
1999	Outstanding Supporting Actor in a Comedy Series	David Hyde Pierce as Dr. Niles Crane	for "Merry Christmas, Mrs. Moskowitz" + "Three Valentines"	Won	
1999	Outstanding Writing for a Comedy Series	Jay Kogen	for "Merry Christmas, Mrs. Moskowitz"	Won	
2000	Outstanding Comedy Series	David Angell, David Lee, Peter Casey, David Lee, Christopher Lloyd, Joe Keenan, Kelsey Grammer, Jay Kogen, Dan O'Shannon, Sam Johnson, Chris Marcil, Charlie Hauck, Mark Reisman, Rob Hanning, Jon Sherman, Maggie Blanc, David Lloyd, Lori Kirkland Baker		Nominated	
2000	Outstanding Lead Actor in a Comedy Series	Kelsey Grammer as Frasier Crane	for "Radio Wars"	Nominated	
2000	Outstanding Supporting Actor in a Comedy Series	David Hyde Pierce as Dr. Niles Crane	for "Rivals" + "A Tsar is Born"	Nominated	
2000	Outstanding Writing for a Comedy Series	Christopher Lloyd and Joe Keenan	for "Something Borrowed, Someone Blue"	Nominated	
2001	Outstanding Comedy Series	David Angell, Peter Casey, David Lee, Dan O'Shannon, Kelsey Grammer, Mark Reisman, Jon Sherman, Rob Hanning, Sam Johnson, Chris Marcil, Lori Kirkland Baker, Gayle Abrams, Eric Zicklin, Bob Daily, Maggie Blanc, David Lloyd		Nominated	
2001	Outstanding Lead Actor in a Comedy Series	Kelsey Grammer as Frasier Crane	for "Frasier’s Edge"	Nominated	
2001	Outstanding Supporting Actor in a Comedy Series	David Hyde Pierce as Dr. Niles Crane	for "Hooping Cranes" + "Daphne Returns"	Nominated	
2002	Outstanding Lead Actor in a Comedy Series	Kelsey Grammer as Frasier Crane	for "The Love You Fake"	Nominated	
2002	Outstanding Supporting Actor in a Comedy Series	David Hyde Pierce as Dr. Niles Crane	for "Room Full of Heroes" + "Deathtrap"	Nominated	
2003	Outstanding Supporting Actor in a Comedy Series	John Mahoney as Martin Crane	for "The Devil and Dr. Phil" + "Fathers and Sons"	Nominated	
2003	Outstanding Supporting Actor in a Comedy Series	David Hyde Pierce as Dr. Niles Crane	for "Fraternal Schwinns" + "Roe to Perdition"	Nominated	
2004	Outstanding Lead Actor in a Comedy Series	Kelsey Grammer as Frasier Crane	for "The Doctor is Out"	Won	
2004	Outstanding Supporting Actor in a Comedy Series	David Hyde Pierce as Dr. Niles Crane	for "No Sex Please We’re Skittish" + "Goodnight, Seattle"	Won	
2004	Outstanding Writing for a Comedy Series	Christopher Lloyd and Joe Keenan	for "Goodnight, Seattle"	Nominated	

==== Creative Arts Emmy Awards ====
Year	Category	Nominee(s)	Episode(s)	Result	Ref
1994	Outstanding Individual Achievement in Art Direction for a Series	Roy Christopher, Sharon Viljoen and Ron Olsen	for "A Midwinter Night's Dream"	Nominated	
1994	Outstanding Individual Achievement in Editing for a Series – Multi-Camera Production	Ron Volk	for "The Show Where Lilith Comes Back"	Won	
1994	Outstanding Guest Actor in a Comedy Series	John Glover as Ned Miller	for "Oops"	Nominated	
1994	Outstanding Individual Achievement in Main Title Theme Music	Bruce Miller and Darryl Phinnessee		Nominated	
1994	Outstanding Individual Achievement in Sound Mixing for a Comedy Series or a Special	Thomas J. Huth, Sam Black, Bobby Douglas and Robert Crosby	for "A Midwinter Night's Dream"	Nominated	
1995	Outstanding Individual Achievement in Art Direction for a Series	Ron Volk and Ron Olsen	for "The Innkeepers"	Nominated	
1995	Outstanding Individual Achievement in Editing for a Series – Multi-Camera Production	Ron Volk	for "The Matchmaker"	Nominated	
1995	Outstanding Guest Actor in a Comedy Series	Nathan Lane as Phil	for "Fool Me Once, Shame On You. Fool Me Twice..."	Nominated	
1995	Outstanding Guest Actress in a Comedy Series	Bebe Neuwirth as Dr. Lilith Sternin	for "Adventures in Paradise" Part II	Nominated	
1995	Outstanding Guest Actress in a Comedy Series	JoBeth Williams as Madeline Marshall	for "Adventures in Paradise" Part II	Nominated	
1995	Outstanding Individual Achievement in Sound Mixing for a Comedy Series or a Special	Dana Mark McClure, Thomas J. Huth, David M. Weishaar and Robert Douglass	for "Adventures in Paradise", Part 2	Nominated	
1996	Outstanding Casting for a Series	Jeff Greenberg		Nominated	
1996	Outstanding Guest Actor in a Comedy Series	Griffin Dunne as Bob	for "The Friend"	Nominated	
1996	Outstanding Guest Actor in a Comedy Series	Harris Yulin as Jerome Belasco	for "A Word to the Wiseguy"	Nominated	
1996	Outstanding Guest Actress in a Comedy Series	Shelley Long as Diane Chambers	for "The Show Where Diane Comes Back"	Nominated	
1996	Outstanding Multi-Camera Editing for a Series	Timothy Mozer	for "The Adventures Of Bad Boy And Dirty Girl"	Nominated	
1996	Outstanding Multi-Camera Editing for a Series	Ron Volk	for "The Show Where Diane Comes Back"	Won	
1996	Outstanding Sound Mixing for a Comedy Series or a Special	Dana Mark McClure, Thomas J. Huth, David M. Weishaar & Robert Douglass	for "Kisses Sweeter Than Wine"	Won	
1997	Outstanding Casting for a Series	Jeff Greenberg		Nominated	
1997	Outstanding Guest Actor in a Comedy Series	James Earl Jones as Norman	for "Roz’s Krantz and Gouldenstein are Dead"	Nominated	
1997	Outstanding Guest Actress in a Comedy Series	Marsha Mason as Sherry	for "Dad Loves Sherry, The Boys Just Whine"	Nominated	
1997	Outstanding Multi-Camera Editing for a Series	Ron Volk	for "To Kill a Talking Bird"	Nominated	
1997	Outstanding Sound Mixing for a Comedy Series or a Special	John Reiner, Andre Caporaso, Robert Douglass and Dana Mark McClure	for "Liar, Liar"	Nominated	
1998	Outstanding Casting for a Series	Jeff Greenberg		Nominated	
1998	Outstanding Guest Actress in a Comedy Series	Patti LuPone as Zora	for "Beware of Greeks"	Nominated	
1998	Outstanding Costume Design for a Series	Audrey M. Bansmer	for "Halloween"	Nominated	
1998	Outstanding Multi-Camera Editing for a Series	Janet Ashikaga	for "Roz and the Schnoz"	Nominated	
1998	Outstanding Multi-Camera Editing for a Series	Ron Volk	for "Room Service"	Won	
1998	Outstanding Sound Mixing for a Comedy Series or a Special	Dana Mark McClure, John Reiner, Andre Caporaso & Robert Douglass	for "Beware the Greeks"	Nominated	
1999	Outstanding Guest Actor in a Comedy Series	Woody Harrelson as Woody Boyd	for "The Show Where Woody Shows Up"	Nominated	
1999	Outstanding Guest Actress in a Comedy Series	Christine Baranski as Dr. Nora Fairchild	for "Dr. Nora"	Nominated	
1999	Outstanding Guest Actress in a Comedy Series	Piper Laurie as Mrs. Mulhern	for "Dr. Nora"	Nominated	
1999	Outstanding Multi-Camera Editing for a Series	Ron Volk	for "Shutout in Seattle"	Nominated	
1999	Outstanding Sound Mixing for a Comedy Series or a Special	Dana Mark McClure, Thomas J. Huth, Andre Caporaso and Robert Douglass	for "Three Valentines"	Nominated	
2000	Outstanding Guest Actor in a Comedy Series	Anthony LaPaglia as Simon Moon	for "Something Borrowed, Someone Blue"	Nominated	
2000	Outstanding Guest Actress in a Comedy Series	Jean Smart as Lorna Lenley	for "Big Crane on Campus"	Won	
2000	Outstanding Multi-Camera Editing for a Series	Ron Volk	for "Dark Side of the Moon"	Nominated	
2000	Outstanding Multi-Camera Editing for a Series	Ron Volk and Scott Maisano	for "Something Borrowed, Someone Blue"	Won	
2000	Outstanding Sound Mixing for a Comedy Series or a Special	Dana Mark McClure, Andre Caporaso, Robert Douglass and Thomas J. Huth	for "Something Borrowed, Someone Blue"	Nominated	
2001	Outstanding Guest Actor in a Comedy Series	Victor Garber as Ferguson	for "Taking Liberties"	Nominated	
2001	Outstanding Guest Actor in a Comedy Series	Derek Jacobi as Jackson Hedley	for "The Show Must Go Off"	Won	
2001	Outstanding Guest Actress in a Comedy Series	Jean Smart as Lana Gardner		Won	
2001	Outstanding Art Direction for a Multi-Camera Series	Roy Christopher & Ron Olsen	for "Cranes Go Caribbean"	Nominated	
2001	Outstanding Casting for a Comedy Series	Jeff Greenberg		Nominated	
2001	Outstanding Cinematography for a Multi-Camera Series	Ken Lamkin	for "And The Dish Ran Away with the Spoon"	Nominated	
2001	Outstanding Multi-Camera Picture Editing for a Series	Ron Volk	for "Daphne Returns"	Won	
2001	Outstanding Multi-Camera Sound Mixing for a Comedy Series or a Special	Dana Mark McClure, Andre Caporaso, Robert Douglass and Thomas J. Huth	for "Hooping Cranes"	Nominated	
2002	Outstanding Casting for a Comedy Series	Jeff Greenberg		Nominated	
2002	Outstanding Cinematography for a Multi-Camera Series	Ken Lamkin	for "Deathtrap"	Nominated	
2002	Outstanding Guest Actor in a Comedy Series	Adam Arkin as Tom	for "The Two Hundredth"	Nominated	
2002	Outstanding Guest Actor in a Comedy Series	Brian Cox as Harry Moon	for "Moons Over Seattle"	Nominated	
2002	Outstanding Guest Actor in a Comedy Series	Anthony LaPaglia as Simon Moon	for "The Mother Load"	Won	
2002	Outstanding Multi-Camera Picture Editing for a Series	Ron Volk	for "The Proposal"	Won	
2002	Outstanding Multi-Camera Sound Mixing for a Comedy Series or a Special	Dana Mark McClure, Andre Caporaso, Robert Douglass and Thomas J. Huth	for "Bla-Z-Boy"	Won	
2003	Outstanding Cinematography for a Multi-Camera Series	Ken Lamkin	for "Rooms with a View"	Nominated	
2003	Outstanding Multi-Camera Picture Editing for a Series	Ron Volk	for "Rooms with a View"	Won	
2003	Outstanding Multi-Camera Sound Mixing for a Comedy Series or a Special	Dana Mark McClure, Andre Caporaso, Robert Douglass and Thomas J. Huth	for "Daphne Does Dinner"	Nominated	
2004	Outstanding Art Direction for a Multi-Camera Series	Roy Christopher, Amy Skjonsby-Winslow and Ron Olsen	for "Freudian Sleep" and "Caught in the Act"	Won	
2004	Outstanding Casting for a Comedy Series	Jeff Greenberg		Nominated	
2004	Outstanding Guest Actor in a Comedy Series	Anthony LaPaglia as Simon Moon		Nominated	
2004	Outstanding Guest Actress in a Comedy Series	Laura Linney as Charlotte Connor		Won	
2004	Outstanding Multi-Camera Picture Editing for a Series	Ron Volk	for "Goodnight, Seattle"	Won	
2004	Outstanding Multi-Camera Sound Mixing for a Series or Special	Thomas J. Huth, Andre Caporaso, Robert Douglass, and Dana Mark McClure	for "The Doctor Is Out"	Won	

=== Golden Globe Awards ===
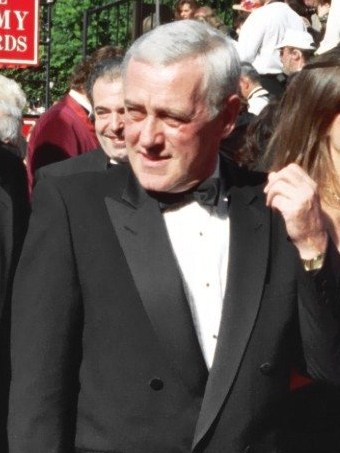
John Mahoney was twice nominated for a Golden Globe Award for his performance as Frasier's father, Martin

Frasier received 24 Golden Globe Award nominations during its tenure, with two wins for Best Actor – Television Series Musical or Comedy for Kelsey Grammer.

Year	Category	Nominee(s)	Result	Ref
1994	Best Television Series – Musical or Comedy		Nominated	
1994	Best Actor – Television Series Musical or Comedy	Kelsey Grammer as Frasier Crane	Nominated	
1994	Best Supporting Actor – Series, Miniseries or Television Film	John Mahoney as Martin Crane	Nominated	
1995	Best Television Series – Musical or Comedy		Nominated	
1995	Best Actor – Television Series Musical or Comedy	Kelsey Grammer as Frasier Crane	Nominated	
1995	Best Supporting Actor – Series, Miniseries or Television Film	David Hyde Pierce as Niles Crane	Nominated	
1995	Best Supporting Actress – Series, Miniseries or Television Film	Jane Leeves as Daphne Moon	Nominated	
1996	Best Television Series – Musical or Comedy		Nominated	
1996	Best Actor – Television Series Musical or Comedy	Kelsey Grammer as Frasier Crane	Won	
1996	Best Supporting Actor – Series, Miniseries or Television Film	David Hyde Pierce as Niles Crane	Nominated	
1997	Best Television Series – Musical or Comedy		Nominated	
1997	Best Actor – Television Series Musical or Comedy	Kelsey Grammer as Frasier Crane	Nominated	
1997	Best Supporting Actor – Series, Miniseries or Television Film	David Hyde Pierce as Niles Crane	Nominated	
1998	Best Television Series – Musical or Comedy		Nominated	
1998	Best Actor – Television Series Musical or Comedy	Kelsey Grammer as Frasier Crane	Nominated	
1998	Best Supporting Actor – Series, Miniseries or Television Film	David Hyde Pierce as Niles Crane	Nominated	
1999	Best Television Series – Musical or Comedy		Nominated	
1999	Best Actor – Television Series Musical or Comedy	Kelsey Grammer as Frasier Crane	Nominated	
2001	Best Television Series – Musical or Comedy		Nominated	
2001	Best Actor – Television Series Musical or Comedy	Kelsey Grammer as Frasier Crane	Won	
2001	Best Supporting Actor – Series, Miniseries or Television Film	David Hyde Pierce as Niles Crane	Nominated	
2001	Best Supporting Actor – Series, Miniseries or Television Film	John Mahoney as Martin Crane	Nominated	
2002	Best Television Series – Musical or Comedy		Nominated	
2002	Best Actor – Television Series Musical or Comedy	Kelsey Grammer as Frasier Crane	Nominated	

=== Humanitas Prize ===
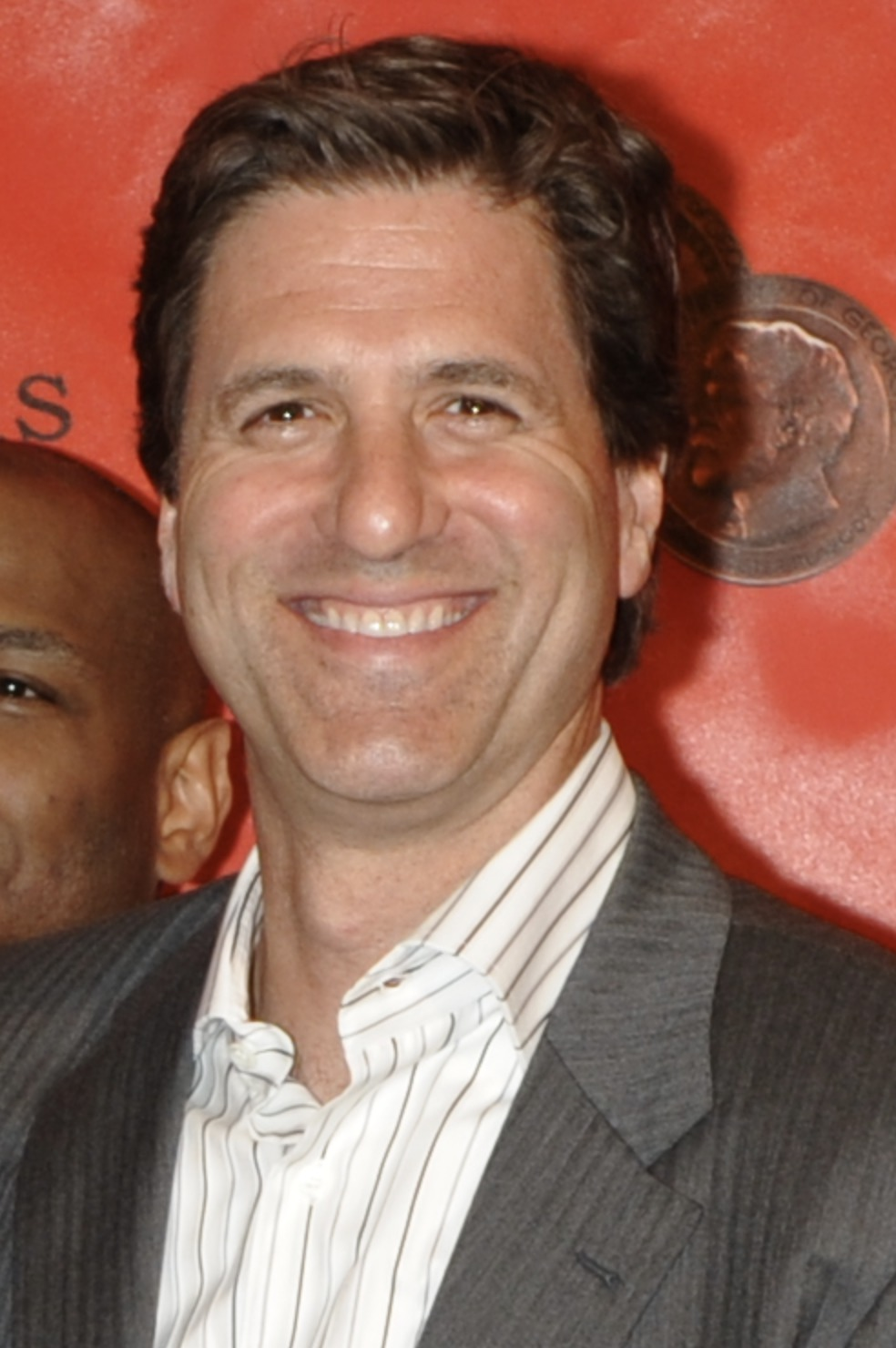
Steven Levitan won the Humanitas Prize for the episode "Breaking the Ice"

Awarded since 1974, the Humanitas Prize is an annual accolade that recognizes outstanding achievement of writers in film and television whose work promotes human dignity, meaning and freedom. Frasier received 6 nominations of for the award for 30 Minute Network or Syndicated Television, winning twice times in 1996 and 2000.

Year	Category	Nominee(s)	Episode(s)	Result	Ref
1994	30 Minute Network or Syndicated Television	David Angell, Peter Casey and David Lee	for "The Good Son"	Nominated	
1996	30 Minute Network or Syndicated Television	Steven Levitan	for "Breaking the Ice"	Won	
1998	30 Minute Network or Syndicated Television	Jeffrey Richman and Suzanne Martin	for "The Kid"	Nominated	
2000	30 Minute Network or Syndicated Television	Jay Kogen	for "Something About Dr. Mary"	Won	
2001	30 Minute Network or Syndicated Television	Jon Sherman and Dan O'Shannon	for "Frasier's Edge"	Nominated	
2003	30 Minute Network or Syndicated Television	Dan O'Shannon, Lori Kirkland Baker and Bob Daily	for "Rooms with a View"	Nominated	

=== Q Awards ===
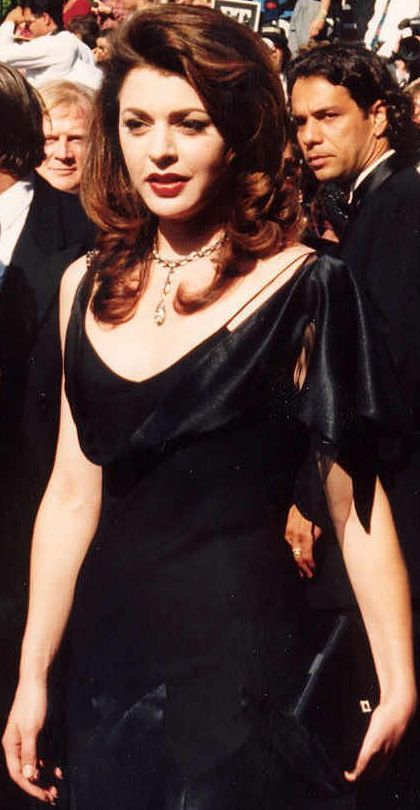
Jane Leeves won a Q award for her performance on the series and received five more nominations

The Q Award, presented by the Viewers for Quality Television, honors programs and performers that the organization deem are of the highest quality. Out of 32 nominations, Frasier won thirteen awards, including Best Quality Comedy Series three times from 1995 to 1997; Best Actor in a Quality Comedy Series for Kelsey Grammer four times from 1995 to 1998; Best Supporting Actor in a Comedy Series for David Hyde Pierce six times from 1993 to 1998 and 2000; and Best Supporting Actress in a Comedy Series for Jane Leeves in 1995.

Year	Category	Nominee(s)	Result	Ref
1994	Best Quality Comedy Series		Nominated	
1994	Best Actor in a Quality Comedy Series	Kelsey Grammer	Nominated	
1994	Best Supporting Actor in a Quality Comedy Series	David Hyde Pierce	Won	
1994	Best Supporting Actress in a Quality Comedy Series	Jane Leeves	Nominated	
1995	Best Quality Comedy Series		Won	
1995	Best Actor in a Quality Comedy Series	Kelsey Grammer	Won	
1995	Best Supporting Actor in a Quality Comedy Series	David Hyde Pierce	Won	
1995	Best Supporting Actress in a Quality Comedy Series	Peri Gilpin	Nominated	
1995	Best Supporting Actress in a Quality Comedy Series	Jane Leeves	Won	
1996	Best Quality Comedy Series		Won	
1996	Best Actor in a Quality Comedy Series	Kelsey Grammer	Won	
1996	Best Supporting Actor in a Quality Comedy Series	David Hyde Pierce	Won	
1997	Best Quality Comedy Series		Won	
1997	Best Actor in a Quality Comedy Series	Kelsey Grammer	Won	
1997	Best Supporting Actor in a Quality Comedy Series	John Mahoney	Nominated	
1997	Best Supporting Actor in a Quality Comedy Series	David Hyde Pierce	Won	
1997	Best Supporting Actress in a Quality Comedy Series	Peri Gilpin	Nominated	
1997	Best Supporting Actress in a Quality Comedy Series	Jane Leeves	Nominated	
1997	Best Recurring Player	Marsha Mason	Nominated	
1998	Best Quality Comedy Series		Nominated	
1998	Best Actor in a Quality Comedy Series	Kelsey Grammer	Won	
1998	Best Supporting Actor in a Quality Comedy Series	John Mahoney	Nominated	
1998	Best Supporting Actor in a Quality Comedy Series	David Hyde Pierce	Won	
1998	Best Supporting Actress in a Quality Comedy Series	Peri Gilpin	Nominated	
1998	Best Supporting Actress in a Quality Comedy Series	Jane Leeves	Nominated	
1999	Best Quality Comedy Series		Nominated	
1999	Best Actor in a Quality Comedy Series	Kelsey Grammer	Nominated	
1999	Best Supporting Actor in a Quality Comedy Series	David Hyde Pierce	Nominated	
1999	Best Supporting Actress in a Quality Comedy Series	Jane Leeves	Nominated	
2000	Best Quality Comedy Series		Nominated	
2000	Best Actor in a Quality Comedy Series	Kelsey Grammer	Nominated	
2000	Best Supporting Actor in a Quality Comedy Series	John Mahoney	Nominated	
2000	Best Supporting Actor in a Quality Comedy Series	David Hyde Pierce	Won	
2000	Best Supporting Actress in a Quality Comedy Series	Peri Gilpin	Nominated	
2000	Best Supporting Actress in a Quality Comedy Series	Jane Leeves	Nominated	

=== Satellite Awards ===
During its tenure, Frasier received fourteen award nominations for a Satellite Award, winning three awards—winning one for Best Television Series – Musical or Comedy while Kelsey Grammer won two for Best Actor – Television Series Musical or Comedy.

Year	Category	Nominee(s)	Result	Ref
1997	Best Television Series – Musical or Comedy		Won	
1997	Best Actor – Television Series Musical or Comedy	Kelsey Grammer	Won	
1998	Best Television Series – Musical or Comedy		Nominated	
1998	Best Actor – Television Series Musical or Comedy	Kelsey Grammer	Nominated	
1999	Best Television Series – Musical or Comedy		Nominated	
1999	Best Actor – Television Series Musical or Comedy	David Hyde Pierce	Nominated	
1999	Best Actress – Television Series Musical or Comedy	Jane Leeves	Nominated	
2000	Best Television Series – Musical or Comedy		Nominated	
2000	Best Actor – Television Series Musical or Comedy	John Mahoney	Nominated	
2001	Best Television Series – Musical or Comedy		Nominated	
2001	Best Actor – Television Series Musical or Comedy	Kelsey Grammer	Won	
2002	Best Supporting Actor – Television Series Musical or Comedy	David Hyde Pierce	Nominated	
2003	Best Supporting Actor – Television Series Musical or Comedy	David Hyde Pierce	Nominated	
2003	Best Supporting Actress – Television Series Musical or Comedy	Jane Leeves	Nominated	

=== Screen Actors Guild Awards ===
Frasier received 26 Screen Actors Guild Award nominations, eight for Outstanding Performance by a Male Actor in a Comedy Series for Kelsey Grammer and David Hyde Pierce each and ten for Outstanding Performance by an Ensemble in a Comedy Series for the cast. Pierce won the award in 1996 while the cast won the ensemble award in 2000.

Year	Category	Nominee(s)	Result	Ref
1994	Outstanding Performance by a Male Actor in a Comedy Series	Kelsey Grammer as Frasier Crane	Nominated	
1994	Outstanding Performance by a Male Actor in a Comedy Series	David Hyde Pierce as Niles Crane	Nominated	
1994	Outstanding Performance by an Ensemble in a Comedy Series	Peri Gilpin, Kelsey Grammer, Jane Leeves, John Mahoney and David Hyde Pierce	Nominated	
1995	Outstanding Performance by a Male Actor in a Comedy Series	Kelsey Grammer as Frasier Crane	Nominated	
1995	Outstanding Performance by a Male Actor in a Comedy Series	David Hyde Pierce as Niles Crane	Won	
1995	Outstanding Performance by an Ensemble in a Comedy Series	Dan Butler, Peri Gilpin, Kelsey Grammer, Jane Leeves, John Mahoney and David Hyde Pierce	Nominated	
1996	Outstanding Performance by a Male Actor in a Comedy Series	Kelsey Grammer as Frasier Crane	Nominated	
1996	Outstanding Performance by a Male Actor in a Comedy Series	David Hyde Pierce as Niles Crane	Nominated	
1996	Outstanding Performance by an Ensemble in a Comedy Series	Dan Butler, Peri Gilpin, Kelsey Grammer, Jane Leeves, John Mahoney and David Hyde Pierce	Nominated	
1997	Outstanding Performance by a Male Actor in a Comedy Series	Kelsey Grammer as Frasier Crane	Nominated	
1997	Outstanding Performance by a Male Actor in a Comedy Series	David Hyde Pierce as Niles Crane	Nominated	
1997	Outstanding Performance by an Ensemble in a Comedy Series	Dan Butler, Peri Gilpin, Kelsey Grammer, Jane Leeves, John Mahoney and David Hyde Pierce	Nominated	
1998	Outstanding Performance by a Male Actor in a Comedy Series	Kelsey Grammer as Frasier Crane	Nominated	
1998	Outstanding Performance by a Male Actor in a Comedy Series	David Hyde Pierce as Niles Crane	Nominated	
1998	Outstanding Performance by an Ensemble in a Comedy Series	Peri Gilpin, Kelsey Grammer, Jane Leeves, John Mahoney and David Hyde Pierce	Nominated	
1999	Outstanding Performance by a Male Actor in a Comedy Series	Kelsey Grammer as Frasier Crane	Nominated	
1999	Outstanding Performance by a Male Actor in a Comedy Series	David Hyde Pierce as Niles Crane	Nominated	
1999	Outstanding Performance by an Ensemble in a Comedy Series	Peri Gilpin, Kelsey Grammer, Jane Leeves, John Mahoney and David Hyde Pierce	Won	
2000	Outstanding Performance by a Male Actor in a Comedy Series	Kelsey Grammer as Frasier Crane	Nominated	
2000	Outstanding Performance by a Male Actor in a Comedy Series	David Hyde Pierce as Niles Crane	Nominated	
2000	Outstanding Performance by an Ensemble in a Comedy Series	Peri Gilpin, Kelsey Grammer, Jane Leeves, John Mahoney and David Hyde Pierce	Nominated	
2001	Outstanding Performance by a Male Actor in a Comedy Series	Kelsey Grammer as Frasier Crane	Nominated	
2001	Outstanding Performance by a Male Actor in a Comedy Series	David Hyde Pierce as Niles Crane	Nominated	
2001	Outstanding Performance by an Ensemble in a Comedy Series	Peri Gilpin, Kelsey Grammer, Jane Leeves, John Mahoney and David Hyde Pierce	Nominated	
2002	Outstanding Performance by an Ensemble in a Comedy Series	Peri Gilpin, Kelsey Grammer, Jane Leeves, John Mahoney and David Hyde Pierce	Nominated	
2003	Outstanding Performance by an Ensemble in a Comedy Series	Peri Gilpin, Kelsey Grammer, Jane Leeves, John Mahoney and David Hyde Pierce	Nominated	

=== Television Critics Association Awards ===
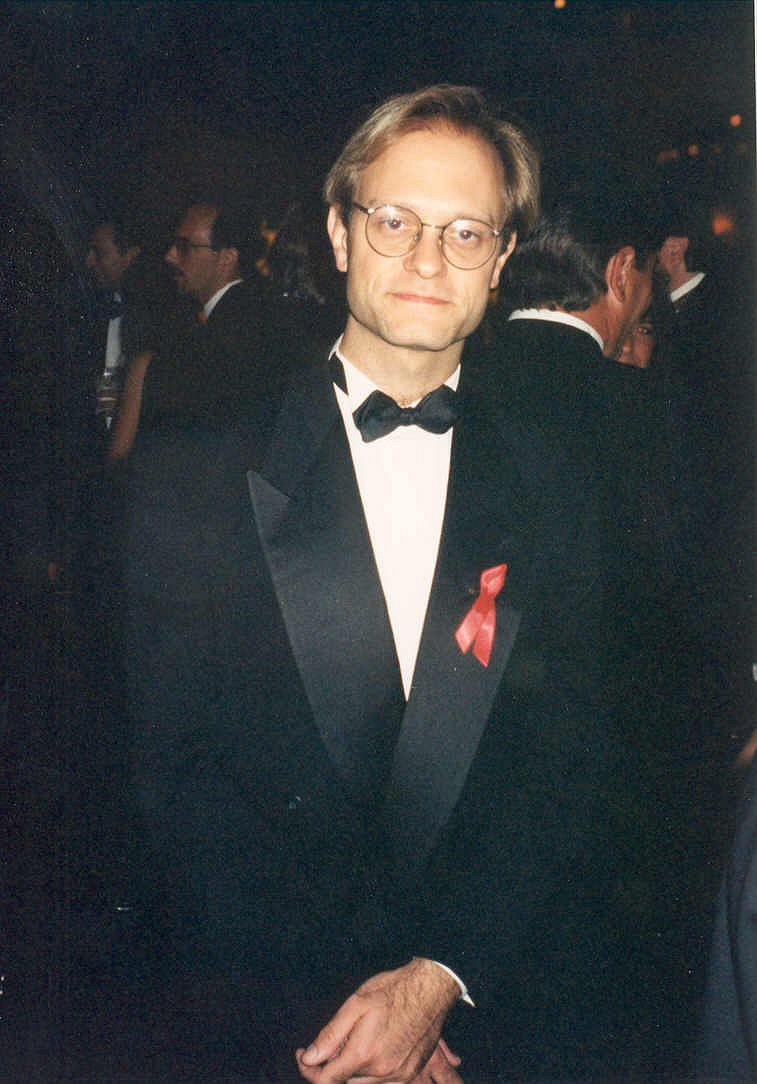
David Hyde Pierce won two TCA awards for his performance as Niles Crane on the series

During its tenure, Frasier received eleven TCA Award nominations, winning five. Three wins were for Outstanding Achievement in Comedy while two were for Individual Achievement in Comedy, awarded to David Hyde Pierce.

Year	Category	Nominee(s)	Result	Ref
1994	Outstanding Achievement in Comedy		Won	
1995	Outstanding Achievement in Comedy		Won	
1996	Outstanding Achievement in Comedy		Won	
1997	Outstanding Achievement in Comedy		Nominated	
1997	Individual Achievement in Comedy	Kelsey Grammer	Nominated	
1997	Individual Achievement in Comedy	David Hyde Pierce	Won	
1998	Outstanding Achievement in Comedy		Nominated	
1998	Individual Achievement in Comedy	David Hyde Pierce	Won	
1999	Individual Achievement in Comedy	Kelsey Grammer	Nominated	
2000	Outstanding Achievement in Comedy		Nominated	
2004	Heritage Award		Nominated	

=== TV Guide Awards ===
Frasier received ten award nominations for a TV Guide Award, winning three awards.

Year	Category	Nominee(s)	Result	Ref
1999	Favorite Comedy Series		Won	
1999	Favorite Actor in a Comedy	David Hyde Pierce	Nominated	
2000	Favorite Comedy Series		Nominated	
2000	Favorite Actor in a Comedy	David Hyde Pierce	Won	
2000	Favorite TV Pet		Won	
2001	Comedy Series of the Year		Nominated	
2001	Actor of the Year in a Comedy Series	David Hyde Pierce	Nominated	
2001	Actor of the Year in a Comedy Series	Kelsey Grammer	Nominated	
2001	Supporting Actor of the Year in a Comedy Series	John Mahoney	Nominated	
2001	Supporting Actress of the Year in a Comedy Series	Jane Leeves	Nominated	

=== TV Land Awards ===
The TV Land Award is an award presented at the eponymous award ceremony, airing on TV Land, that honors television programs that are off air. Frasier received three nominations.

Year	Category	Nominee(s)	Result	Ref
2005	Classic TV Broadcaster of the Year	Kelsey Grammer	Nominated	
2005	Chicest Sitcom Décor	Frasier's apartment	Nominated	
2006	Broadcaster of the Year	Kelsey Grammer	Nominated	

=== Writers Guild of America Awards ===
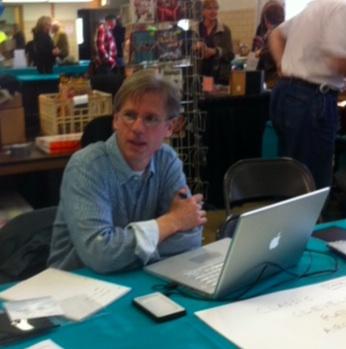
Dan O'Shannon (pictured), together with Lori Kirkland and Bob Daily, won the WGA Award for Television: Episodic Comedy in 2003

Presented by the Writers Guild of America (WGA), the Writers Guild of America Award is an annual accolade that recognizes outstanding achievement of writers in film, television, radio, promotional writing, and video games. Frasier received 9 nominations of for the award for Television: Episodic Comedy, winning six times.

Year	Category	Nominee(s)	Episode(s)	Result	Ref
1994	Television: Episodic Comedy	Chuck Ranberg and Anne Flett-Giordano	for "A Mid-Winter Night's Dream"	Nominated	
1995	Television: Episodic Comedy	Elias Davis and David Pollock	for "The Club"	Nominated	
1995	Television: Episodic Comedy	Joe Keenan	for "The Matchmaker"	Won	
1997	Television: Episodic Comedy	Rob Greenberg	for "The Impossible Dream"	Nominated	
1998	Television: Episodic Comedy	Rob Greenberg	for "Frasier's Imaginary Friend"	Won	
1999	Television: Episodic Comedy	Jay Kogen	for "Merry Christmas, Mrs. Moskowitz"	Won	
2000	Television: Episodic Comedy	Joe Keenan	for "Out with Dad"	Nominated	
2000	Television: Episodic Comedy	Christopher Lloyd and Joe Keenan	for "Something Borrowed, Someone Blue"	Won	
2002	Television: Episodic Comedy	Dan O'Shannon, Lori Kirkland, and Bob Daily	for "Rooms with a View"	Won	
2003	Television: Episodic Comedy	Bob Daily	for "No Sex Please, We're Skittish"	Won	

=== Other awards ===
Frasier was also the recipient of a Peabody Award in 1994, with the award committee praising it as "an uncommonly good comedy of manners and mores in contemporary times" and for delving "into sensitive issues with inventive writing, exceptional characterization and unusual insight." The series also won two People's Choice Awards in 1994 and 1999 and a Producers Guild of America Award for Best Episodic Television in 1995. The series also received nominations for two NAACP Image Awards, an Angel Award, ADG Excellence in Production Design Awards, and Young Artist Award.

Award	Year of ceremony	Category	Nominee(s)	Result	Ref
ADG Excellence in Production Design Awards	1996	Excellence in Production Design for a Television Series	Roy Christopher and Wendell Johnson	Nominated	
ADG Excellence in Production Design Awards	1997	Excellence in Production Design for a Television Series	Roy Christopher and Richard Fernandez	Nominated	
Angel Awards	2001	Silver Angel for Television		Nominated	
British Comedy Awards	1996	International comedy		Won	
People's Choice Awards	1994	Favorite New TV Comedy Series		Won	
People's Choice Awards	1999	Favorite Television Comedy Series		Won	
NAACP Image Awards	1997	Outstanding Supporting Actor in a Comedy Series	James Earl Jones	Nominated	
NAACP Image Awards	2000	Outstanding Supporting Actress in a Comedy Series	Kim Coles	Nominated	
Peabody Award	1994	NBC, Grub Street Productions and Paramount Television		Won	
Producers Guild of America Awards	1995	Best Episodic Television	David Angell, Peter Casey, David Lee, Christopher Lloyd, Vic Rauseo, Linda Morris and Steven Levitan	Won	
Producers Guild of America Awards	1999	Best Episodic Comedy		Nominated	
Producers Guild of America Awards	2000	Best Episodic Comedy		Nominated	
Youth Artist Awards	2002	Best Performance in a TV Comedy Series - Guest Starring Young Actor	Steven Anthony Lawrence	Nominated	
