= Frasier season 6 =

Season of television series

Frasier
- Season 6
- DVD cover
- Showrunners: Christopher Lloyd; Joe Keenan
- Starring: Kelsey Grammer; Jane Leeves; David Hyde Pierce; Peri Gilpin; Dan Butler; John Mahoney
- No. of episodes: 24

Release
- Original network: NBC
- Original release: September 24, 1998 – May 20, 1999

Season chronology
- ← Previous; Season 5 Next → Season 7

The sixth season of the American television sitcom Frasier aired on NBC from September 24, 1998 to May 20, 1999.

== Cast ==
=== Main ===
- Kelsey Grammer as Frasier Crane
- Jane Leeves as Daphne Moon
- David Hyde Pierce as Niles Crane
- Peri Gilpin as Roz Doyle
- John Mahoney as Martin Crane

=== Recurring ===
- Edward Hibbert as Gil Chesterton
- Patrick Kerr as Noel Shempsky
- Dan Butler as Bulldog

=== Special guest ===
- Teri Hatcher as Marie
- Amy Brenneman as Faye
- Eva Marie Saint as Joanna Doyle
- Woody Harrelson as Woody Boyd
- Virginia Madsen as Cassandra Stone
- Saul Rubinek as Donny Douglas
- Christine Baranski as Dr. Nora Fairchild
- Piper Laurie as Mrs. Mulhern

=== Guest ===
- Tom McGowan as Kenny
- Timothy Omundson as Director
- Erika Christensen as Teenage Girl
- Fritz Weaver as Sir Trevor Ainsley
- Catherine Dent as Claudia Kynock
- Carole Shelley as Helen
- Trevor Einhorn as Frederick Crane
- Rosemary Murphy as Carol Larkin
- Mimi Hines as Mrs. Latimer
- Carolee Carmello as Jody
- Alice Playten as Bonnie
- Jason Graae as Jack
- Gregory Jbara as Bartender
- Fran Kranz as Aaron Fitch

== Episodes ==
No. overall	No. in season	Title	Directed by	Written by	Original release date	Prod. code	U.S. viewers (millions)
121	1	"Good Grief"	Pamela Fryman	Christopher Lloyd	September 24, 1998	601	28.30
After losing his job at KACL, Frasier keeps himself busy while he looks for work however Niles believes he is experiencing denial. He moves through the other five stages of grief; anger as his former co-workers all find new jobs, bargaining as he assembles his fan club only to find they only have three members who humiliate him by holding a rally no-one attends before finally getting stalled in depression as he starts overeating to the point he steals Alice's baby food. The family eventually stage an intervention and force him to accept the loss of his job.
122	2	"Frasier's Curse"	Pamela Fryman	Jay Kogen	October 1, 1998	602	25.18
Frasier has been invited to his school reunion, an event he believes is cursed as they always occur when he is at a low point in his life, such as his divorce with Lilith and being left at the altar by Diane. He is thus not keen to attend now he is out of a job and single. He reconsiders after a former classmate sees him looking shabby, fearing that rumors may spread at the reunion that he is homeless.
123	3	"Dial M for Martin"	Ken Lamkin	Rob Greenberg	October 8, 1998	604	25.66
Frasier and Martin find themselves having numerous arguments than usual now that Frasier is at home all day. Roz suggests Martin consider moving in with Niles for a spell, and Niles agrees since Daphne would come with him. However Daphne considers that Martin no longer needs a live-in physical therapist and starts looking for a new position. While moving Martin into his apartment, Niles kicks away his father's cane and he falls over. Martin becomes increasingly afraid that Niles is unconsciously trying to harm him to prevent Daphne from leaving.
124	4	"Hot Ticket"	David Lee	Jeffrey Richman	October 15, 1998	603	22.24
Frasier and Niles have tickets to a play in which the great actor Sir Trevor Aimsley (Fritz Weaver) will be making his final appearance before retirement but they are turned away on the door, having bought matinee tickets by mistake. The following night, they stand in the cancellation line, and are at the front of the queue when they are greeted by the Kendalls, a couple who regularly socialize with the Seattle elite. They cannot bear to admit that they are queuing for cancellations, and miss their opportunity for tickets by leaving the line. They are invited by the Kendalls to dinner with Sir Trevor after the performance, and face the prospect of making conversation about a play which they have not seen.
125	5	"First, Do No Harm"	Sheldon Epps	Jordan Hawley & William Schifrin	October 29, 1998	605	24.64
Martin has arranged for Frasier to meet up again with Duke's daughter, Marie (Teri Hatcher), whom he first met when they were both children. Frasier is pleasantly surprised at how beautiful she has become, and enjoys having dinner with her, but notices that she has some neurotic tendencies. He eventually realises that Marie is attracted to him because of his psychiatric expertise, causing him to break up with her. He soon reconsiders and gets back together with her, only to then realise that he was only attracted to her because he enjoyed analyzing her.
126	6	"Secret Admirer"	Pamela Fryman	Lori Kirkland	November 5, 1998	607	22.12
Frasier has been dating Nancy, a former KACL worker, while Niles and Maris have reached a financial settlement. After a squash game with Niles, Frasier discovers some Cartier cufflinks in his bag, with an unsigned note from someone who misses him. He is thrilled at the possibility that he has a secret admirer as well as Nancy, and Martin has to tolerate his gloating for some time. Soon afterwards, a waitress at Café Nervosa brings him a box containing a Patek Philippe pocket watch, saying it was delivered earlier by a woman. Frasier is even more thrilled, but then Niles discovers a card in the box, indicating that the gift was actually intended for him and was from Maris, who wants him back. He refuses to sign the settlement, and she sends him the shredded settlement papers and a nickel, accompanied with a note stating that this is all he will have left after the divorce.
127	7	"How to Bury a Millionaire"	Pamela Fryman	Lori Kirkland	November 12, 1998	608	22.00
Niles has been forced by his ongoing divorce from Maris to buy a cheaper car, as his Mercedes has been repossessed. Frasier tells Niles that the biggest drain on his finances is his apartment and forces him to start renting it out. After living with (and annoying) Frasier and Martin for a while, Niles is forced to move into the Shangri-La, a bachelor's apartment complex that falls well below his high standards but is also the only one he can afford.
128	8	"The Seal Who Came to Dinner"	David Lee	Joe Keenan	November 19, 1998	606	21.68
Niles' gourmet club will soon be awarding the annual Golden Apron Award, and the final phase of the contest requires each contender to host a dinner party at their home. Niles is too ashamed to allow the club into his new apartment at the Shangri-La, but remembers that Maris has a beach house that would present a perfect setting, and she is out of the country. On first inspection of the house, everything seems fine, until they discover a dead seal lying on the beach outside. Desperate that this evening should go well, Niles and Frasier must then hurry to dispose of the creature before the party starts only for a neighbor to call the police believing Niles has murdered Maris.
129	9	"Roz, a Loan"	Pamela Fryman	Janis Hirsch	December 10, 1998	609	23.64
Roz is in a difficult financial situation, struggling to pay for her rent and baby clothes. KACL's ratings are suffering as a result of the new format, but the management still will not change it. Frasier does not expect this to last, and offers to lend Roz $1500 to help her along in the meantime. He is surprised afterwards to see that she seems to be spending rather extravagantly: spa treatment, expensive lunches, perfume. He wonders if he should talk to her about this, but Martin and Niles firmly advise him not to get involved, especially since he specifically said to Roz that the money was hers to use as she pleased. Eventually, KACL reconsiders and gives Frasier and his colleagues their jobs back.
130	10	"Merry Christmas, Mrs. Moskowitz"	Kelsey Grammer	Jay Kogen	December 17, 1998	611	24.99
Christmas is approaching, and while out shopping with Roz and looking for a menorah for his son, Frasier makes a covert attempt to purchase a sweater for Roz. Just before she realizes, a woman named Helen (Carole Shelley) steps in and rescues Frasier by pretending that she is buying it. She recognizes him from the radio, and when he offers his thanks and asks if he can return the kindness, she suggests a date with her daughter, Faye (Amy Brenneman). When it transpires that Faye and Helen thought Frasier was Jewish, he must maintain the pretense to avoid offending Helen.
131	11	"Good Samaritan"	Sheldon Epps	Alex Gregory & Peter Huyck	January 7, 1999	612	24.56
After several acts of kindness backfire, Frasier starts to lose his faith in humanity. Driving home in the rain, he comes across a stranded woman and considers whether or not to give her a ride. Despite the events of the day, he decides to help her, only to discover that she is a prostitute and a transvestite, and that the police are watching. He is arrested and held at Martin's old precinct, where Martin and Niles must bail him out. Upon returning home and explaining the situation, his son Frederick asks; "So are you saying you shouldn't help people?" The scene returns to Frasier in the car contemplating whether or not to give the woman a ride (the preceding events having been what Frasier later describes as a 'bad daydream'). Despite knowing that this good deed, like all the others, may backfire he still decides to help her. Guest Callers: Ron Howard as Stephen; William H. Macy as Ralph
132	12	"Our Parents, Ourselves"	Pamela Fryman	Janis Hirsch	January 21, 1999	614	23.59
Roz's mother Joanna (Eva Marie Saint) is visiting, and Frasier suggests fixing her up with Martin. They spend an evening together, but after Roz and Joanna have left, Martin admits to Frasier that he found her very boring company. Roz, though, reports that her mother had a wonderful evening and hopes to see Martin again before she leaves Seattle. Not wanting to hurt Joanna and upset Roz, Frasier invites them to watch the Super Bowl and does not tell Martin, only for Martin to invite a date around too. Guest Callers: Phil Donahue as Larry; Marlo Thomas as Sophie
133	13	"The Show Where Woody Shows Up"	Pamela Fryman	Rob Greenberg	February 4, 1999	615	24.83
Frasier receives a phonecall during his show at KACL from Woody Boyd (Woody Harrelson), an old friend from Cheers, who has just arrived in Seattle for the week after accidentally getting on the wrong plane. They catch up, but Frasier soon finds that he is no longer enjoying spending time with Woody, since they have nothing in common except a few old stories. He also feels bad for him as Woody is still a bartender while he is a famous psychiatrist. However, he cannot bring himself to hurt his friend's feelings. When Woody leaves town early, Frasier bids him farewell, then goes out with Niles for a late supper to celebrate. Once at the cantina, he spots Woody hiding behind a menu at the bar. Woody explains that he feels sorry for Frasier, as he still lives with his father and goes out with his brother. Frasier realizes that Woody does have a good life that keeps him happy, and tells him how lucky he is. They agree to share a last beer and promise to reconnect in five or ten years. Guest Caller: Beverly D'Angelo as Audrey
134	14	"Three Valentines"	Kelsey Grammer	Rob Hanning	February 11, 1999	616	25.83
On Valentine's Day, three separate stories are told; in preparation for a date whom Niles has invited over to Frasier's apartment for dinner, Niles attempts to iron a crease out of his trousers, and disaster ensues when they catch fire and he loses control of the extinguisher. Frasier is meeting with Cassandra Stone (Virginia Madsen), the station's new marketing manager, but is unsure as to whether it is a romantic date or just a business meeting. Meanwhile, both without dates, Martin and Daphne decide to have a meal together and discover what it is like to be dateless.
135	15	"To Tell the Truth"	David Lee	Rob Hanning	February 18, 1999	610	27.74
Maris's divorce lawyers have motioned to postpone the trial date for eight months, which will be ruinously expensive for Niles. Frasier recommends he find himself new lawyers (since his current ones are clearly more than happy to keep draining his finances) and Roz suggests an ex-boyfriend of hers, Donny Douglas (Saul Rubinek). Donny is cheery, uncouth, and slobby, but aggressively deals with Maris' lawyers, who are cowed into submission and gets the trial moved up to a few weeks time. Donny is hired, and begins preparing the family for deposition. Maris' lawyers are claiming that Niles was in love with Daphne throughout the period that the marriage was breaking apart, and Frasier feels unable to lie under oath to deny it. As Niles prepares for the inevitability he may have to come clean to Daphne about his feelings for her, Donny discovers that Maris' family fortune was made from urinal cakes, rather than lumber as she had always claimed. To spare herself embarrassment, she agrees to a quick divorce to ensure Niles' silence. However, his happiness is quickly quashed upon discovering Daphne and Donny have started dating.
136	16	"Decoys"	Pamela Fryman	David Lloyd	February 25, 1999	613	25.57
Niles has been awarded Maris' lake-front cottage, Shady Glen, in the divorce settlement. Frasier suggests he go with Niles and Martin to spend a weekend there, to take his brother's mind off his troubles. Niles tries to persuade Daphne to join them, but she declines. He then devises a plan to split her up from Donny, by inviting him to the cottage, and also inviting Roz, whom he used to date. He hopes that they may re-connect. Things start to become more complicated when Frasier and Martin arrive ahead of schedule, and Niles pretends that Roz is there for his benefit; and then Daphne also appears, having changed her mind about coming.
137	17	"Dinner Party"	David Lee	Jeffrey Richman	March 11, 1999	617	21.94
Frasier decides to hold a dinner party, and plans it with Niles. When his invitees the Walburts ring back to accept the invitation, the answering machine takes the message, and Frasier and Niles hear the couple talking about them before they realize they are still connected. This leads the brothers to worry that their friends see them rather like a married couple themselves.
138	18	"Taps at the Montana"	David Lee	David Lloyd	March 25, 1999	621	23.11
Niles returns from a miserable meal with Frasier; both Daphne and Maris were seated at the tables next to them in romantic dates with their new boyfriends. He has not moved back into the Montana, as his apartment is currently occupied by a sub-tenant, Dr. MacLowery. MacLowery is an avid tap dancer, and the noise from his routines has infuriated the other residents of the building. As a result, representatives from the building's board of tenants arrive to tell Niles that the board is seriously considering terminating his lease. In order to get the board back on his side, Niles and Frasier organize a drinks gathering for the next meeting in order to persuade them to change their minds, with Roz present to stand-in for the caterers, who cancelled.
139	19	"IQ"	David Lee	Rob Hanning & Jay Kogen	April 8, 1999	624	21.70
Niles, Frasier, Martin and Roz attend a silent auction for the Kelly Anne Grunther Foundation. Niles stumbles upon an auction for a luncheon with three Nobel Laureates, and soon finds himself bidding against Frasier. The two become determined to beat the other. When the auction closes, Niles has the highest bid, but a second seat at the table is opened up as long as Frasier can match him. The two brothers are aghast to realise that they have paid over $8,000 for a lunch. Later that night, over sherry in Frasier's apartment, Niles and Frasier ask themselves where their harsh sibling rivalry originated, and reminisce about how they once took IQ Tests while they were younger. Their mother never told them the answers; only that they were 2 points apart. In an effort to bring closure to their rivalry once and for all, Martin reluctantly agrees to show them the results, and it soon transpires that whilst Frasier has an IQ level of 129, Niles has the larger IQ: 156. At first, their responses are mature and non-competitive, but their true feelings cannot be concealed for long. The brothers attempt to outdo each other by studying all night in a university library. Frasier drinks a great deal of coffee to stay awake, and Niles takes some allergy medicine to deal with his parchment mite allergy. The medicine makes him dopey, and he proceeds to pass out at the luncheon table, destroying everything, just as the Nobel Laureates walk into the room.
140	20	"Dr. Nora"	Katy Garretson	Joe Keenan	April 29, 1999	618	21.41
Frasier is in Café Nervosa interviewing candidates for a new radio psychiatrist at KACL, whose show will run alongside his own. He thinks he has found an unbeatable contender in Dr. Gordon Edelstein; and Niles, who knows his work, expects him to be right. In the end, however, he recommends Dr. Nora Fairchild (Christine Baranski), who spends most of her interview paying him compliments, even pretending to think Niles is the older brother. Frasier feels proud to have a protégé, until he actually hears her in action. She turns out to be an advocate of old-fashioned values, condemning pre-marital sex, divorce, single parenthood and the like, and her approach to therapy is not so much constructive criticism as outright abuse. Frasier is embarrassed and angry and withdraws his recommendation, however it turns out that this is no longer a factor; Dr. Nora attracts so much attention (positive and negative) that Kenny wants to keep her on and decides to make her a permanent fixture. When she openly criticises Frasier's advice to one particular caller on air and makes clear her intention to undermine and embarrass him at every opportunity, he and Roz decide on a declaration of war. Roz is able to find proof that Nora is a hypocrite and doesn't even have a medical degree of any kind - she is a gym teacher instead, but Frasier has second thoughts about stooping to Nora's level. Fortunately, Niles has been listening to this caller and the way Dr. Nora dealt with her, and he has a more subtle way of approaching the problem: find her mother (Piper Laurie) and use her to find the problems with Nora's abusive approach. That turned out to be a terrible idea as she reveals herself to be much, much worse than Nora, abusing her on the air and causing Nora to scream and cry bloody murder out of KACL with her monstrous mother in pursuit, with it heavily implied to have happened dozens of times before. Guest Callers: Gillian Anderson as Jenny; Yo-Yo Ma as Tom; Bonnie Raitt as Denise; Pia Zadora as Jill
141	21	"When a Man Loves Two Women"	David Lee	Alex Gregory & Peter Huyck	May 6, 1999	619	20.04
Frasier announces at breakfast that he had a date the previous evening, and Martin and Daphne immediately offer their sympathies. They change their tune when Cassandra appears from the bedroom. Martin takes a shine to her when she greets him with a hug and compliments him on his eyes; she barely acknowledges Daphne, and then forgets her name. Niles arrives to play squash with Frasier, and has to cancel when he learns about the date. Frasier has good feelings about this new relationship, until he runs into Faye at Café Nervosa. She has been in Paris for a month, and has no idea that Frasier has a new girlfriend, and he finds himself unable to tell her. She is still with him the next morning, so the rest of the family realise that he is dating two women. Frasier soon comes to the decision that he cannot juggle two women, and must choose between them. Martin advocates choosing Cassandra; Daphne prefers Faye, who noticed and admired her new haircut. Niles turns up, and discovers he has to reschedule the squash game again, but he has a trick for compelling Frasier to make his choice. Unfortunately, even when the choice is made, Frasier still has to end one relationship, and this proves more difficult than he expected.
142	22	"Visions of Daphne"	Robert H. Egan	Janis Hirsch & Lori Kirkland	May 13, 1999	620	21.49
Martin has news for Frasier: he has just seen Donny buying an engagement ring. They first plan to keep this from Daphne, but she walks in halfway through their conversation. When she hears the news, she is thrilled and excited. Martin and Frasier then plan not to tell Niles, but again he walks in at the wrong moment, and after initially pretending that Daphne's mother is dying, the real story comes out and Niles is crushed. Soon after this, Daphne visits Niles unexpectedly at his office, and asks for advice. She tells him that she had a psychic vision in which a mysterious figure in a red bow tie appeared at her wedding, and said he was "the true love of her life". Niles betrays his professional integrity and advises her not to marry Donny. Frasier, when he hears about this later, reckons that psychologically the vision means she is having second thoughts. Additionally, of course, he knows exactly why Niles gave the advice he did, and loses patience with his brother when he arrives a few moments later wearing a red bow tie. Later that evening, Daphne decides to go through with marrying Donny, claiming that perhaps her visions are false. She suddenly has another, however, and this one contains her true love holding a dragon. Martin laughs, and Daphne agrees that it is probably false. Back at home, however, Niles opens a present that Roz had offered him earlier. It contains a dragon statue.
143	23	"Shutout in Seattle"	Pamela Fryman	David Isaacs	May 20, 1999	622	27.23
144	24	"Shutout in Seattle"	Pamela Fryman	David Isaacs	May 20, 1999	623	27.23
Niles has been having a difficult time recently, being surrounded by happy couples: Frasier and Faye; Daphne and Donny; and now Martin and Bonnie, a waitress from McGinty's. He meets Roz late one Saturday in Café Nervosa, and she has also had a bad day; her date cancelled earlier, and she resents the waitress serving them, whom she knows from the gym. The next day, Frasier is surprised to discover that she gave into her loneliness and slept with Bulldog, and is now mortified with embarrassment. Later on, Daphne confides in him the awful truth that she has lost her engagement ring, and is trying to conceal the fact from Donny. Niles apparently goes missing, not answering any phone calls, and Frasier and Martin suddenly panic in case he, also driven by loneliness, has gone back to Maris. They hasten to the Montana, only to discover that he is with Kit (Jessica Cauffiel), the waitress from Café Nervosa whom Roz dislikes. Roz, incidentally, seems unable to resist the temptation to sleep with Bulldog again, but when he refers to her as his girlfriend, she is repulsed by the idea. However, she cannot bear to tell him this after he announces that KACL has fired him. The Crane couples start to have problems: Frasier keeps calling Faye Cassandra by mistake, Martin is annoyed by the way Bonnie's poodle, Lady, dominates Eddie and Niles' attempt to conform to Kit's lifestyle (including a new leather jacket and use of youthful slang terms like "buzz-kill") soon starts to wear him down. In the end, all three Crane men end up single again and spend an evening together drinking and singing in a piano bar.
