= Out with Dad =

Out with Dad may refer to:

- "Out with Dad", an episode in the seventh season of the American situation comedy Frasier
- Out With Dad (web series), a web series produced in Canada
