= 7th Golden Laurel Awards =

7th Annual Golden Laurel Awards
- Date: March 6, 1996
- Location: Beverly Wilshire Hotel, Los Angeles, California
- Country: United States
- Presented by: Producers Guild of America

Highlights
- Best Producer(s) Motion Picture: Apollo 13 – Brian Grazer and Todd Hallowell

The 7th PGA Golden Laurel Awards, honoring the best film and television producers of 1995, were held at the Regent Beverly Wilshire Hotel in Los Angeles, California on March 6, 1996.

== Winners and nominees ==
=== Film ===
Outstanding Producer of Theatrical Motion Pictures
- Apollo 13 – Brian Grazer and Todd Hallowell
  - The American President – Rob Reiner
  - The Bridges of Madison County – Clint Eastwood and Kathleen Kennedy
  - Dead Man Walking – Jon Kilik and Tim Robbins
  - Il Postino: The Postman – Mario Cecchi Gori, Vittorio Cecchi Gori and Gaetano Daniele
  - Leaving Las Vegas – Lila Cazès and Annie Stewart
  - Sense and Sensibility – Lindsay Doran

=== Television ===
Outstanding Producer of Episodic Television
- Frasier (NBC) – David Angell, Peter Casey, David Lee, Christopher Lloyd, Vic Rauseo, Linda Morris, and Steven Levitan
Outstanding Producer of Long-Form Television
- Truman (HBO) – Doro Bachrach, Anthea Sylbert, and Paula Weinstein

=== Special ===
Lifetime Achievement Award in Motion Picture
- Walter Mirisch
Lifetime Achievement Award in Television
- Ted Turner
Most Promising Producer in Theatrical Motion Pictures
- The Brothers McMullen – Edward Burns and Dick Fisher
Most Promising Producer in Television
- Dr. Katz, Professional Therapist – Tim Braine, Nancy Geller, Jonathan Katz, and Tom Snyder
Honorary Lifetime Membership Award
- Robert B. Radnitz
Special Award of Merit
- Toy Story – Bonnie Arnold, and Ralph Guggenheim
