= Frasier season 7 =

Season of television series

Frasier
- Season 7
- DVD cover
- Showrunners: Christopher Lloyd; Joe Keenan
- Starring: Kelsey Grammer; Jane Leeves; David Hyde Pierce; Peri Gilpin; John Mahoney
- No. of episodes: 24

Release
- Original network: NBC
- Original release: September 23, 1999 – May 18, 2000

Season chronology
- ← Previous; Season 6 Next → Season 8

The seventh season of the American television sitcom Frasier aired on NBC from September 23, 1999 to May 18, 2000.

== Cast ==
=== Main ===
- Kelsey Grammer as Frasier Crane
- Jane Leeves as Daphne Moon
- David Hyde Pierce as Niles Crane
- Peri Gilpin as Roz Doyle
- John Mahoney as Martin Crane

=== Special guest ===
- Saul Rubinek as Donny Douglas
- Rita Wilson as Mia
- Katie Finneran as Poppy
- Dan Butler as Bulldog
- Jane Adams as Mel
- Bebe Neuwirth as Lilith
- Jean Smart as Lorna Lenley
- Marg Helgenberger as Emily
- Brian Bedford as Edward
- Harriet Sansom Harris as Bebe Glazer
- Robert Loggia as Stefano
- S. Epatha Merkerson as Dr. McCaskill
- Anthony LaPaglia as Simon

=== Recurring ===
- Edward Hibbert as Gil Chesterton
- Patrick Kerr as Noel
- Tom McGowan as Kenny

=== Guest ===
- Gigi Rice as Regan
- Trevor Einhorn as Frederick
- Anthony Zerbe as Clifford
- Anthony Heald as Corkmaster
- Kim Coles as Dr. Mary
- Millicent Martin as Mrs. Moon

== Episodes ==
No. overall	No. in season	Title	Directed by	Written by	Original release date	Prod. code	U.S. viewers (millions)
145	1	"Momma Mia"	Kelsey Grammer	Rob Hanning	September 23, 1999	703	25.24
Frasier starts dating Mia Preston (Rita Wilson), a children's author whose books he used to read to Frederick. When Niles and Martin meet her, they are startled to discover that she looks just like the brothers' late mother, Hester, which Frasier does not realize. The three Cranes plan to spend the weekend at a cabin where they vacationed years ago to celebrate Martin's birthday. As a gift the brothers bring old home movies transferred to videotape. Frasier sees the resemblance when watching the home movies, in which his mother appears, and realizes to his horror that he is dating her spitting image.
146	2	"Father of the Bride"	David Lee	Mark Reisman	September 30, 1999	701	23.74
Frasier is trying to decide on a wedding present for Daphne and Donny, and Roz is apprehensive in case she is asked to be a bridesmaid, recalling her previous experiences, all of which involved wearing awful dresses. Frasier wishes to offer to pay for Daphne's wedding flowers, but is interrupted by hiccups brought on by some jerky Martin made him eat, and inadvertently offers to pay for the wedding. Meanwhile, Niles has met an attractive woman through what he presumes to be a dating service, but is in fact an escort agency.
147	3	"Radio Wars"	Sheldon Epps	Sam Johnson & Chris Marcil	October 7, 1999	702	21.32
Frasier is the subject of repeated prank phonecalls from KACL's new morning team, Carlos (John Ennis) and the Chicken (Bryan Callen), and seeks revenge. The pranks culminate in a medley of sound effects and sound bites, engineered to sound like a sex session between Frasier and Roz.
148	4	"Everyone's a Critic"	Pamela Fryman	Joe Keenan	October 14, 1999	704	20.93
The owner of KACL has sent her daughter, Poppy Delafield (Katie Finneran), to start an internship at the station. Everyone finds her unbearable because she can never stop talking, though they are all too polite to say so. Meanwhile, Niles has been appointed art critic of a posh magazine, The Monocle, and is now attending performances for free and socializing with the elite of Seattle. Jealous of Niles's position, Frasier approaches Poppy to propose that he host a new arts show on KACL, but she misunderstands and becomes the host of the new show herself.
149	5	"The Dog That Rocks the Cradle"	Pamela Fryman	Bob Daily	October 21, 1999	706	22.04
Since being fired from KACL, Bulldog (Dan Butler) has been working as a pizza delivery man. Frasier suggests to Roz that she employ him as a babysitter for the following day, when she has a date. However, when her date arrives at her door, Bulldog answers it and scares him away. He does the same to several subsequent dates. Meanwhile, Niles has been fighting to reclaim a plot in Verdant Hills, a prestigious cemetery, which he lost after his divorce. He and Frasier encourage their father to organise something for himself, but Martin does not like to tempt fate.
150	6	"Rivals"	Katy Garretson	Christopher Lloyd	November 4, 1999	707	20.65
When Frasier escapes Poppy at Café Nervosa by leaving Niles in his place, Poppy is suddenly less talkative than usual; she finds Niles warm, charming and handsome. Frasier returns home and finds a strange woman in a towel using the phone. The woman, Regan (Gigi Rice), recently moved in next door, and Martin rescued her when she locked herself out. Frasier finds Regan attractive, and intends to ask her out. When Niles meets her, Frasier believes that Niles is attracted to her as well. Niles, in turn, thinks Frasier's persistent hostile remarks about Poppy mask a latent attraction, and so does not believe that he really likes Regan. Both couples attend a charity ball, each brother assuming that the other is pursuing his date.
151	7	"A Tsar Is Born"	Pamela Fryman	Charlie Hauck	November 11, 1999	705	18.61
Antiques Roadshow comes to Seattle, and after watching the previous show together, Martin and his sons decide to take a family heirloom for appraisal. The object, a pewter clock, turns out to be Russian, and is one of a collection made exclusively for the imperial Romanov family. It is valued at $25,000, which Martin is delighted by. Frasier and Niles are more interested in the Romanov connection, and they know that their great-great-grandmother was from Russia. They decide to research their family history, thrilled at the possibility that they may be descended from royalty.
152	8	"The Late Dr. Crane"	Robert H. Egan	Rob Hanning	November 18, 1999	709	18.94
Frasier and Niles have a minor car accident bloodying Frasier’s nose and end up at the hospital. While waiting for Frasier to be seen, Niles discovers that Maris' plastic surgeon, who is still sending him the bills for Maris' botox treatments, is based here. He takes the opportunity to confront this Dr. Mel Karnofsky (Jane Adams), and finds that she is a young-looking, attractive divorcée with a fussy nature akin to his own and an interest in the arts. Later that day, a local news report announces Frasier's death, a case of mistaken identity caused when he left the hospital early, and the person who took his place in the line suffered a fatal heart attack. When reading his obituary in the newspaper, Frasier reflects on his life, and all the things he has yet to achieve. Martin, meanwhile, enjoys the attention and free drinks he receives from everyone who thinks he has just lost his son. Note: Kelsey Grammer’s nose injury and broken ankle were written into the episode.
153	9	"The Apparent Trap"	Kelsey Grammer	Dan O'Shannon	November 25, 1999	708	20.49
Frederick is coming to celebrate Thanksgiving with his father, while Lilith spends the holiday with a colleague. At the last minute, this colleague cancels, and Lilith asks Frasier if she can join them. He concedes, acknowledging that the season should be a celebration of family, even though there is still some awkwardness between Lilith and Niles following their brief tryst. Lilith happens to be writing an article about raising a child after divorce, and Frederick suggests she collaborate with Frasier, and do so while she stays at the apartment. He then goes to some effort to bring his parents closer together, saying privately to each how much the other is missing them, setting up mood lighting and romantic music. They realize that they are being set up, and that Frederick does not wish for them to get back together but is attempting to manipulate them into giving him a more extravagant gift.
154	10	"Back Talk"	Pamela Fryman	Lori Kirkland	December 9, 1999	710	23.72
Frasier pulls a muscle in his back and is confined to home. He has been irritable with Daphne recently, and while thinking out loud in the presence of Eddie, he realises that this is because he will miss her when she marries and leaves the household. Daphne emerges, unnoticed, to hear Frasier confess that he loves her. She does not realize that his feelings are platonic, and is horrified and embarrassed. When she tells Martin that "Dr. Crane" has confessed his feelings for her, he assumes she is referring to Niles and confirms it. Frasier soon realizes that, as Niles has not been present to confess anything, Daphne has misinterpreted. He takes the opportunity to assure her of this. Daphne is relieved, and gives Frasier a massage as his strong medication begins to work. In his drowsy state, his speech is unguarded, and when she revisits what Martin said, he reveals that it is Niles that has feelings for her.
155	11	"The Fight Before Christmas"	Pamela Fryman	Jon Sherman	December 16, 1999	711	28.54
Frasier is planning his Victorian Christmas party at home, and is trying to keep it a secret at KACL, having only invited Roz out of his work colleagues. He has also invited Cam Winston, deciding to call their feud to a temporary halt. Daphne is having an awkward time, as Frasier does not remember what he said under the influence of his painkillers, and Niles does not yet realize that she knows his feelings. Niles, meanwhile, has to offer his condolences in person to Maris after her old gardener Yoshi dies, but Frasier advises him not to tell Mel. She eventually finds out and is very angry, so Niles does his best to talk her round. Frasier's Christmas party is a disaster, and it does not take long for him to find out why: Cam Winston is holding a rival party in his apartment, and poaching all Frasier's guests. Daphne panics when she learns that Niles and Mel have broken up, and still more when she overhears Frasier in the kitchen advising Niles to "make his feelings clear to her", not knowing that he means Maris.
156	12	"RDWRER"	Kelsey Grammer	Sam Johnson & Chris Marcil	January 6, 2000	712	24.08
Chez Henri has burned down, and Frasier and Niles feel like the new millennium has been canceled. They must now make alternative plans for their New Year's celebrations. Martin is in a better mood, having received the customized number plates he ordered for his new Winnebago RV. The plates read "RDWRER", which he claims is short for "Road Warrior". Frasier and Niles remember that the Wine Club is hosting a celebration in Sun Valley, Idaho to which they are invited, but unable to find a flight at short notice, they end up traveling with Martin in the Winnebago.
157	13	"They're Playing Our Song"	David Lee	David Lloyd	January 13, 2000	713	19.41
When Kenny decides that each show on KACL requires a special theme jingle, Frasier struggles to think of one. Martin composes a catchy tune, but Frasier dismisses it, instead composing an overblown theme which combines a Broadway musical-style chorus with an incongruous film-score background for Niles' monologue), before being forced to provide something short and simple, which Martin again composes.
158	14	"Big Crane on Campus"	Sheldon Epps	Mark Reisman	February 3, 2000	714	20.47
Frasier runs into Lorna Lenley (Jean Smart) at Café Nervosa, who went to his school and was one of the most popular girls. She is now working in real estate. He invites her to visit his apartment under the pretext of an appraisal, and they end up spending the night together. The following morning, he sees another side to her: she smokes, shouts down the phone, and is not very refined, and Frasier becomes concerned that they have no future together. However, soon afterward she invites him to accompany her to the retirement dinner of their school football coach, and he imagines the reactions of the formerly popular students if they saw him arrive with Lorna. Meanwhile, after Daphne tends to Niles after a minor injury, he suspects that she may be in love with him.
159	15	"Out with Dad"	David Lee	Joe Keenan	February 10, 2000	717	20.27
It is Valentine's Day. Niles cancels a night out with Frasier at the opera to be with his girlfriend Mel. Frasier persuades Martin to go instead, and at the opera, they meet Emily (Marg Helgenberger) and her mother Helen (Mary Louise Wilson) during intermission. Helen tries to ask Martin out on a date, but he tells her he is gay to let her down gently. That evening, Emily brings her gay uncle, Edward (Brian Bedford), to Frasier's apartment, hoping to set him up with Martin. When Martin realises, he pretends that he and Niles are an item.
160	16	"Something About Dr. Mary"	Wil Shriner	Jay Kogen	February 17, 2000	715	21.70
Roz is going on holiday, and desperate to avoid having her replaced by Chuck Ranberg (who has a distracting speech impediment), Frasier decides to hire someone from outside KACL. He appoints a woman from a community outreach program called Mary Thomas (Kim Coles), who is initially reluctant to speak during the broadcast, but soon pitches in with folksy, jovial advice of her own. She soon becomes very popular. Frasier is upset and wants Roz to return, but is worried about appearing bigoted because Mary is black. Meanwhile, Daphne is injured during Niles' demonstration of his new skills at kickboxing. Niles insists on doing all Daphne's household chores until she has fully recovered. Martin decides to take advantage of the fact that, until now, his son had no idea what these chores were. Guest Callers: Gloria Estefan as Maria; Isaac Mizrahi as Gabe
161	17	"Whine Club"	Kelsey Grammer	Bob Daily & Jon Sherman	February 24, 2000	716	21.26
Frasier is very excited about the prospect of being elected "Corkmaster" of his local wine club, which he has asked Niles to nominate him for. However, Mel manipulatively persuades Niles to run against his brother for the position. At the meeting, the vote is tied and, a wine-tasting tiebreaker overseen by the outgoing corkmaster (Anthony Heald) sees Niles narrowly win. Frasier is gracious in defeat, until he discovers that Mel provided the impetus for Niles' decision to stand. Meanwhile, Martin has embarked on an affair with Claire Wojadubakowski (Anita Gillette), an old friend whose husband Stan died a few weeks before. As Martin and Stan were close, he is feeling guilty over this, and endeavors to conceal the fact from Frasier.
162	18	"Hot Pursuit"	Sheldon Epps	Charlie Hauck	March 23, 2000	719	20.00
Donny asks for Martin's help in obtaining surveillance photos for one of his court cases. Martin is thrilled at the idea of a stakeout, remembering his days with the police force; Niles is worried about the potential risks of the neighborhood, and decides to go along and keep his father company. Frasier and Roz are attending a broadcast conference out of town, and when Frasier discovers that he has no room at the hotel, he asks to sleep on Roz's couch. She reluctantly agrees, conceding that neither of them is likely to need the room if the cocktail party is the usual Bacchanalian revel. Unfortunately, they both suffer similar lack of success, and end up together in Roz's room sharing champagne and stories.
163	19	"Morning Becomes Entertainment"	Pamela Fryman	Rob Hanning & Jay Kogen	April 6, 2000	722	16.66
Frasier's show is being taken off the air for a week. This happens to be at the time when he is renegotiating his contract with KACL, so he believes this is a tactic of theirs. Bebe Glazer soon tells him that the situation is bleak, but he and Roz have been offered the chance to host AM Seattle on television. Roz turns up on the first day with a fever and delirium, and is incapable of co-hosting, so Bebe steps into her place. During the show, Frasier makes several valiant attempts to raise the level of decorum, but Bebe artfully keeps it light, persuading him to do impressions and so forth. By the end of the week, they are both intoxicated by the experience. However, Frasier learns that Bebe is stalling the negotiations with KACL and starts to suspect that she is angling to make their move to AM Seattle permanent.
164	20	"To Thine Old Self Be True"	Robert H. Egan	Dan O'Shannon	April 27, 2000	718	20.39
Donny is having trouble with his best man, who cannot organize his bachelor party, so Frasier volunteers to make the arrangements for him. Daphne is relieved when she finds out, predicting that Frasier will organize a low-key, civilized event. Martin decides to help out by inviting a stripper (Rachel York) to the apartment for an interview, and she turns up dressed as a policewoman. Frasier runs into difficulty when he gives her some suggestions about an encore for her act, and they end up handcuffed together, without a key to release them. Frasier then has to do his best to hide this fact from Daphne, and numerous visitors, including Mel, Maris and Regan.
165	21	"The Three Faces of Frasier"	Pamela Fryman	Jon Sherman	May 4, 2000	721	16.75
Frasier has an announcement to make, for which he is taking Martin, Daphne and Niles out to dinner at Stefano's Italian restaurant. Niles refuses to go, making up an excuse about a patient's crisis; the truth is, he had an embarrassing experience at this restaurant as a child, and is still traumatized by it. Frasier has to make the announcement without him: the restaurant is putting a sketch of his face on their Seattle Wall of Fame, and the unveiling is that very evening. He is very proud, until he sees the caricature; the artist has extravagantly exaggerated his forehead. Frasier insists on returning the following evening with Niles, to have a tactful word with Stefano about changing it. His criticism goes down badly as it emerges that the artist is Stefano's mother.
166	22	"Dark Side of the Moon"	David Lee	Lori Kirkland	May 11, 2000	720	22.96
Daphne is receiving anger management therapy, in the wake of a four-car pile-up. She explains her situation to Dr. McCaskill (S. Epatha Merkerson), and the episode continues in flashback. Donny has organized a surprise bridal shower for Daphne, to be held at Niles' apartment. After a series of upsetting events which includes the arrival of her alcoholic brother Simon (Anthony LaPaglia), Daphne discovers her favorite dress had been ruined in the laundry. Dr. McCaskill wonders why Daphne keeps mentioning her favorite dress, and why she was wearing it to the bridal shower she did not know she was having. It is revealed in flashback that Daphne wore the dress because she thought she would be spending the evening alone with Niles. She realises that she has feelings for Niles and may no longer want to marry Donny.
167	23	"Something Borrowed, Someone Blue"	Pamela Fryman	Christopher Lloyd & Joe Keenan	May 18, 2000	723	33.70
168	24	"Something Borrowed, Someone Blue"	Pamela Fryman	Christopher Lloyd & Joe Keenan	May 18, 2000	724	33.70
Frasier, Daphne, Niles, Mel and Martin return from the funeral of Morrie, the Elliott Bay Towers’ doorman. Martin bears a final gift from Morrie; a rare bottle of wine. Niles confesses to Frasier that he feels anxious about his relationship with Mel. After Niles denies that he still possesses feelings for Daphne, Frasier urges his brother to seize the moment and move on. Daphne reveals to Frasier that she knows about Niles' seven-year crush on her and she has fallen in love with him. When Niles returns from a retreat, however, he announces that he and Mel are married. Frasier tells Niles that Daphne knows how he feels towards her, and that there is a possibility she shares his feelings. The night before Daphne and Donny's wedding, Niles tells her that he loves her, and they kiss. Daphne then tells Niles that they have made too many commitments to others to back out now. The next morning, Niles sits in the Winnebago, unable to watch Daphne be married. Martin and Frasier join him and prepare to enjoy the rare bottle of wine, only to discover that it is undrinkable. Frasier and Martin leave Niles alone, until Daphne appears in her wedding dress, and asks if he wants to go on a date.

== Reception ==
=== Accolades ===
The series was nominated for three Creative Arts Emmy Awards and six Primetime Emmy Awards, winning two. Frasier received four nominations at the 58th Golden Globe Awards and Grammer won Best Actor in a Television Series Musical or Comedy. The cast won Outstanding Performance by an Ensemble in a Comedy Series at the 6th Screen Actors Guild Awards. Writers Christopher Lloyd and Joe Keenan won a Writers Guild of America Award for "Something Borrowed, Someone Blue", while Keenan also received a nomination for "Out with Dad". Ron Volk earned a nomination from the American Cinema Editors for his work on "Dark Side Of The Moon". While Pamela Fryman was nominated for Outstanding Directing in a Comedy Series at the Directors Guild of America Awards for "The Fight Before Christmas".

Casting director Jeff Greenberg received a nomination at the 16th Artios Awards. Frasier gathered ten nominations from the Online Film & Television Association. The show was nominated for three accolades at the second annual TV Guide Awards, including Favorite Comedy Series and Favorite TV Pet. It also garnered six nominations at the Viewers for Quality Television Awards.
