= Something Borrowed, Someone Blue =

- Frasier episodes
- Episode nos.: Season 7 Episodes 23 & 24
- Directed by: Pamela Fryman
- Written by: Christopher Lloyd & Joe Keenan
- Production codes: 40571-167 & 40571-168
- Original air date: May 18, 2000

Guest appearances
- Saul Rubinek as Donny (special guest star); Jane Adams as Mel (special guest star); Millicent Martin as Mrs. Moon; Anthony La Paglia as Simon (special guest star)

Episode chronology
| ← Previous "The Dark Side of the Moon" | Next → "And the Dish Ran Away with the Spoon" |
- Frasier (season 7)

"Something Borrowed, Someone Blue" is a two-part episode, making up the final two episodes (EP 23 & 24) in season 7 of the American sitcom Frasier. The episode aired on May 18, 2000, on NBC. The hour-long episode brings to a climax the romantic character arc between Niles Crane and Daphne Moon, a significant running plotline for the first seven years of the show's production.

== Plot ==
=== Part I ===
Frasier, Daphne, Niles, Mel, and Martin return from the funeral of Morrie, the doorman of Elliott Bay Towers. Daphne in particular is very emotional, which everyone attributes to nerves before the wedding. Martin bears a final gift from Morrie; a rare bottle of wine retrieved from France following the Second World War. Simon, Daphne's boorish and obnoxious brother, arrives unexpectedly, and Martin invites him to stay in his Winnebago. Mel leaves to prepare for a mid-week retreat to celebrate her first six months with Niles, while he confesses to Frasier that he feels anxious about their relationship. After Niles denies that he still possesses lingering feelings for Daphne, Frasier urges his brother to seize the moment and move on from his habitual sense of caution.

When Martin gives Daphne the bottle of wine as a wedding gift, Daphne breaks down once more. Frasier is left to comfort Daphne.

Daphne reveals that she knows about Niles' seven-year crush on her. She has tormented herself about her own feelings towards Niles and believes that she has fallen in love with him in return. Despite her impending marriage, Frasier urges her to confront Niles and discuss this with him before her marriage. When Niles returns, however, he has exciting news: he has, on impulse, eloped with Mel and married her.

=== Part II ===
Frasier arrives at the luxurious hotel where Daphne and Donny's wedding will take place, hoping to speak to Daphne about recent events. Daphne brushes the matter off, dismissing her feelings as just nerves, and gives Frasier the bottle of wine to thank him for all his kindness and support. They are interrupted by the arrival of Daphne's overbearing and hypercritical mother, Gertrude.

That night following the rehearsal dinner, Frasier and Martin discuss Daphne and Niles. Frasier confesses that he does not believe either Daphne or Niles when they claim to be happy, leading Martin to warn him about interfering; two marriages are at stake. Meanwhile, Niles and Daphne join each other for a dance, and Frasier watches them as they dance close together. Cornering Niles in a hotel room, Frasier reveals that Daphne knows how he feels towards her, and that there is a possibility she shares his feelings. Niles is tormented but resolves to talk to Daphne to find out. Managing to get Daphne alone, Niles confesses that Frasier has told him of her feelings towards him and tells her that he loves her. Before they can discuss anything, they are constantly interrupted, firstly by Martin, then by Donny, then Mel, and finally by Daphne's entire family. Escaping the party to the balcony, the two stand together awkwardly, until Daphne takes action, and the two share their first kiss. She then tells him that they have made too many commitments to others to back out now. Niles is left on the balcony, alone.

The next morning, as the wedding takes place, Niles sits in the front cabin of the Winnebago, unable to watch Daphne be married. Martin and Frasier join him, Frasier bringing with him the rare bottle of wine to honor Niles' bravery in at last opening his heart to Daphne. The three men prepare to enjoy a glass, only to discover that the wine is undrinkable; unfortunately, Morrie kept his wine rack in the boiler room. Frasier and Martin leave to attend the wedding, leaving Niles alone, until a knock at the door rouses him. He turns to see Daphne before him in a full wedding dress, asking him if he wants to go on a date. She has chosen him after all, and as the two prepare to flee the wedding, Daphne realizes that she can finally call him "Niles".

== Reception and nominations ==
The episode was nominated for multiple Emmys. It was one of the most watched episodes of the 2000s.
