= Merry Christmas, Mrs. Moskowitz =

- Frasier episode
- Episode no.: Season 6 Episode 10
- Directed by: Kelsey Grammer
- Written by: Jay Kogen
- Production code: 131
- Original air date: December 17, 1998

Guest appearances
- Amy Brenneman as Faye (special guest star); Carole Shelley as Helen

Episode chronology
← Previous "Roz, a Loan"	Next → "Good Samaritan"
- Frasier (season 6)

"Merry Christmas, Mrs. Moskowitz" is the tenth episode of Frasier's sixth season. It first aired on NBC in the United States on December 17, 1998. In the episode, Frasier, while shopping for Christmas gifts meets a stylish Jewish woman, Helen Moskowitz, who asks him to take her daughter Faye on a blind date. This leads to a deepening relationship between the two. Helen on Christmas Eve makes a stop by Frasier's apartment, unaware that he is not Jewish and so he and the family must pretend that they are to survive the visit.

The episode was directed by Kelsey Grammer and was written by Jay Kogen. Amy Brenneman and Carole Shelley guest star in the episode as Faye and Helen respectively. Since airing, the episode has received many positive reviews from television critics and fans.

== Plot ==
Christmas is approaching, and while out shopping with Roz and looking for a Menorah for his son, Frasier makes a covert attempt to purchase a sweater for Roz. Just before she realises, another woman steps in and rescues Frasier by pretending that she is buying it. She recognises him from the radio, and when he offers his thanks and asks if he can return the kindness, she suggests a date with her daughter, Faye. Frasier accepts, and is pleasantly surprised when he meets her, although she is embarrassed at being fixed up by her mother. Things go well for a while between them, and Faye visits Frasier's apartment with Helen one day on their way to catch a plane to Florida. It is at this point that Frasier discovers that Faye was under the impression that he was Jewish, and although this is not a problem for her, she is worried what her mother will think. He agrees to hide the Christmas decorations and play along, also getting Niles and Martin on side. The deception proves tricky to sustain, as Eddie appears dressed in a Santa Claus costume, someone calls round trying to deliver a Christmas tree, and Daphne is busy organising a holiday revue downstairs (from which Niles appears dressed as Jesus Christ).

== Reception ==
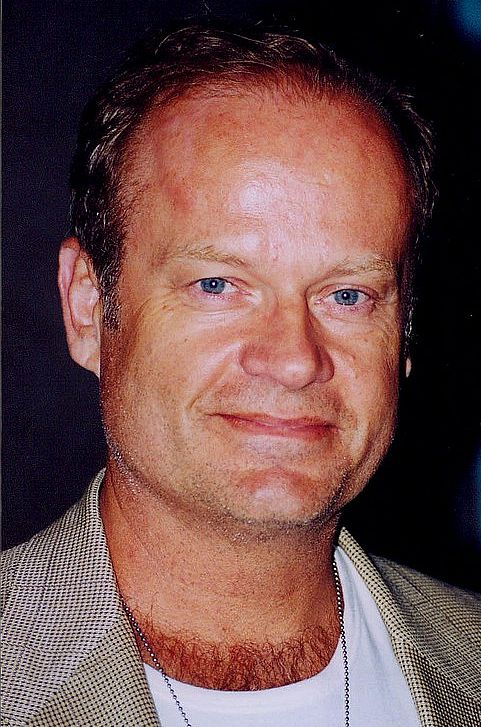
Kelsey Grammer, who stars as Dr. Frasier Crane in the show, directed the episode.

In its original broadcast, "Merry Christmas, Mrs. Moskowitz" finished second in ratings for the week of December 14, 1998, with a Nielsen rating of 16.9. It was the second highest rated show on NBC that week, behind ER. The ratings for "Merry Christmas, Mrs. Moskowitz" went up 1.2 from the previous week's episode, "Roz, a Loan". In the following year, the episode earned writer Jay Kogen a Primetime Emmy Award for Outstanding Writing for a Comedy Series at the 51st Primetime Emmy Awards, in addition to a Writers Guild of America Award for Television: Episodic Comedy. It also earned Kelsey Grammer a Directors Guild of America Award for Outstanding Directing – Comedy Series nomination. The episode was in the season which earned David Hyde Pierce his third Primetime Emmy Award for his portrayal of Niles Crane.
