= Todd Hallowell =

American film producer (born 1952)

- Born: August 29, 1952 (age 73); Cambridge, Minnesota
- Occupation: Film producer

Todd Hallowell (born August 29, 1952) is an American film producer. His credits include How the Grinch Stole Christmas, Cinderella Man, A Beautiful Mind, Apollo 13, Dark Phoenix and Thor: Love and Thunder.

== Filmography ==
As producer

Year	Title	Director	Role
1991	Backdraft	Ron Howard	Associate Producer
1992	Far and Away	Ron Howard	Executive Producer
1994	The Paper	Ron Howard	Executive Producer
1995	Apollo 13	Ron Howard	Executive Producer
1996	Ransom	Ron Howard	Executive Producer
1999	EDtv	Ron Howard	Executive Producer
2000	How The Grinch Stole Christmas	Ron Howard	Executive Producer
2001	A Beautiful Mind	Ron Howard	Executive Producer
2003	The Missing	Ron Howard	Executive Producer
2004	The Alamo	John Lee Hancock	Executive Producer
2005	Cinderella Man	Ron Howard	Executive Producer
2006	The Da Vinci Code	Ron Howard	Executive Producer
2008	Frost/Nixon	Ron Howard	Executive Producer
2009	Angels & Demons	Ron Howard	Executive Producer
2011	The Dilemma	Ron Howard	Executive Producer
2013	Rush	Ron Howard	Executive Producer
2014	X-Men: Days of Future Past	Bryan Singer	Executive Producer
2016	X-Men: Apocalypse	Bryan Singer	Executive Producer
2019	X-Men: Dark Phoenix	Simon Kinberg	Producer
2022	Thor: Love and Thunder	Taika Waititi	Executive Producer
2025	A Minecraft Movie	Jared Hess	Executive Producer

As second unit director

Year	Title	Director
1987	Adventures in Babysitting	Chris Columbus
1991	Backdraft	Ron Howard
1992	Far and Away	Ron Howard
1993	Striking Distance	Rowdy L. Herrington
1994	The Paper	Ron Howard
1995	Apollo 13	Ron Howard
1996	Ransom	Ron Howard
1999	Virus	John Bruno
1999	EDtv	Ron Howard
2000	How The Grinch Stole Christmas	Ron Howard
2001	A Beautiful Mind	Ron Howard
2003	The Missing	Ron Howard
2005	Cinderella Man	Ron Howard
2006	The Da Vinci Code	Ron Howard
2008	Frost/Nixon	Ron Howard
2009	Angels & Demons	Ron Howard
2011	The Dilemma	Ron Howard
2013	Rush	Ron Howard
2014	X-Men: Days of Future Past	Bryan Singer
2016	X-Men: Apocalypse	Bryan Singer
2019	X-Men: Dark Phoenix	Simon Kinberg

As production designer

Year	Title	Director
1986	Tough Guys	Jeff Kanew
1987	Burglar	Hugh Wilson
1987	Adventures in Babysitting	Chris Columbus
1989	The Dream Team	Howard Zieff
1989	Parenthood	Ron Howard
1990	Vital Signs	Marisa Silver
1991	Class Action	Michael Apted
1994	The Paper	Ron Howard

As art director

Year	Title	Director
1984	Cloak & Dagger	Richard Franklin
1985	Back to the Future	Robert Zemeckis
1985	Fletch	Michael Ritchie
1986	Down and Out in Beverly Hills	Paul Mazursky

As actor

Year	Title	Director	Role
1989	Parenthood	Ron Howard	Track Official
1992	Far and Away	Ron Howard	Thug #1
1995	Apollo 13	Ron Howard	Noisy Civilian
1996	Ransom	Ron Howard	Don Campbell
1999	EDtv	Ron Howard	Interviewer
2019	X-Men: Dark Phoenix	Simon Kinberg	Hospital Doctor

Music Department

Year	Title	Director	Role
1994	The Paper	Ron Howard	Writer: "You Just Never Know"
1995	Apollo 13	Ron Howard	Executive music producer
