= Nancy Geller =

American biostatistician

Nancy Lorch Geller is an American biostatistician, the director of biostatistics research at the National Heart, Lung, and Blood Institute and a former president of the American Statistical Association.

== Education ==
Geller studied mathematics at the City College of New York. She then went to Case Western Reserve University for graduate study in mathematics, earning a master's degree and completing her doctorate. Although she had enjoyed probability theory as an undergraduate, and entered graduate school intending to study the same subject, she ended up doing her graduate work in statistics. Her dissertation, supervised by Lajos Takács, was On distribution of Some Kolmogrov-Smirnov Type Statistics.

== Career ==
Geller took faculty positions in statistics at the University of Rochester and the Wharton School of the University of Pennsylvania from . Uninterested in business, she moved again to do biostatistics at the Medical College of Pennsylvania for a year and the Memorial Sloan-Kettering Cancer Center for 11 years. Then she took her position at the National Heart, Lung, and Blood Institute.

She served as president of the American Statistical Association in 2011.

== Awards and honors ==
Geller became a fellow of the American Statistical Association in 1993. She is the 2009 winner of the Janet L. Norwood Award For Outstanding Achievement By A Woman In The Statistical Sciences.
