= Lori Kirkland Baker =

American writer and producer

Lori Kirkland Baker (née Kirkland) is an American writer and producer.

== Career ==
Kirkland first worked as a writer's assistant on Perfect Strangers.

Kirkland was a writer for three episodes of Jenny in 1997. She was a writer and co-executive producer for two seasons of Wings from 1994 to 1996, a writer and executive producer for seven seasons of Frasier from 1998 to 2004, one season of Freddie (2005–2006), two seasons of Desperate Housewives and a season on Nickelodeon's Instant Mom (2013-2014).

Kirkland Baker also taught comedy writing and production to undergraduates and graduate students as an adjunct professor at University of California Los Angeles.

She testified in Nicollette Sheridan's wrongful termination trial.

Kirkland filed paperwork to run in the 2024 California's 47th congressional district election.

== Awards ==
Kirkland won a Primetime Emmy Award and a Writers Guild Award for Frasier.
