= Niles Crane =

Fictional character on the American television sitcom Frasier

Dr. Niles Crane, MD
- Frasier character
- David Hyde Pierce as Dr. Niles Crane
- First appearance: "The Good Son" (episode 1.01)
- Last appearance: "Goodnight, Seattle (Part 2)" (episode 11.24)
- Portrayed by: David Hyde Pierce

In-universe information
- Occupation: Psychiatrist
- Family: Martin Crane (father; deceased); Hester Crane (mother; deceased); Frasier Crane (older brother); Ronee Lawrence (stepmother)
- Spouses: Maris Crane (m. 1986; div. 1998); Melinda "Mel" Karnofsky (m. 2000; div. 2000); Daphne Moon (m. 2002)
- Children: David Crane (b. 2004; son, with Daphne)
- Relatives: Walt Crane (paternal uncle); Zora Crane (paternal aunt); Nikos Crane (paternal cousin); Frederick Crane (nephew); Lilith Sternin (ex-sister-in-law)
- Home: Seattle, Washington

Niles Crane (born 1957) is a fictional character on the American sitcom Frasier, a spin-off of the television show Cheers. He was portrayed by David Hyde Pierce. Niles is the younger brother of Frasier Crane (played by Kelsey Grammer).

Pierce was hired because Frasier producers saw his headshot and commented on how much he looked like a young Grammer. Unlike Frasier, part of whose background comes from Cheers, Niles's background is established over the course of Frasier.

Pierce has said that his character was originally explained to him as "what Frasier would be if he had never gone to Boston and never been exposed to the people at Cheers." Anita Gates of The New York Times wrote in 1998 that "the difference between the brothers is that Frasier knows they're being pretentious; Niles honestly doesn't."

== Background ==
Niles was born in Seattle, Washington, in 1957–1959 (depending on different timelines), to Hester Crane, a psychiatrist, and Martin Crane, a police officer. Like his older brother Frasier, Niles was named for one of his mother's lab rats. Also like Frasier, Niles was an unusually sensitive child and a frequent target for bullies. As a result, he was quite close to his older brother, and at the same time fiercely competitive with him. Like Frasier, Niles prefers fine arts, music, and intellectual pursuits to physical activities like sports. He is also an established philanthropist.

After attending the private Bryce Academy with Frasier, Niles's success in school led to matriculation at Yale University in New Haven, Connecticut, as an undergraduate, where he was a member of Phi Beta Kappa, and studied for a year at the University of Cambridge in Cambridge, England as a graduate student. According to the season 2 episode "The Club", at some point during his young adulthood when Richard Nixon was campaigning for president, he was arrested for "mooning" Nixon, which according to Niles was a result of his being "young and firm and in love with an anarchist".

Niles describes his profession as "the saving grace of my life", and is greatly respected professionally. He specializes in marriage and family therapy. (While substituting for his brother on the radio Niles says, "While Frasier is a Freudian, I am a Jungian. So there'll be no blaming mother today!") Niles is an authority on clinical psychosis, has had his research published in several psychiatric journals, serves on the board of the American Psychiatric Association, and four of his patients have been elected to political office.

Niles often compares his own career to that of his brother, and early in Frasier's career as a talk show host makes frequent jokes about the "fast-food approach to psychiatry" that Frasier practices through his radio show. Niles sometimes admits, however, that he envies how his "big shot radio host" brother is well-known, Frasier's face appears on "the side of buses", and he helps many "people who need it", while no one appreciates his own work.

== Personality ==
Uh, I'd like a petit filet mignon, very lean; not so lean that it lacks flavor, but not so fat that it leaves drippings on the plate. And I don't want it cooked; just lightly seared on either side, pink in the middle; not true pink, but not a mauve either, something in between; bearing in mind, the slightest error either way, and it's ruined.
— Niles to waitress

Niles, like Frasier, is haughty, snobby and fussy, has gourmet tastes, and was described by an interviewer at the Seattle Post-Intelligencer as obsessive-compulsive. He frequently wears double breasted suits and Trafalgar limited-edition suspenders. Although Frasier also plays the piano, when they make music together Niles plays while Frasier sings. He is an admirer of the fine arts including opera, theatre, and classical music, drinks fine wine, and enjoys French cuisine which he himself cooks, and frequently obsesses about knowing the right people and climbing the social ladder. At Cafe Nervosa, the coffee house he frequents with Frasier and other friends and family members, Niles's usual is a latte with a "whisper" of cinnamon, and occasionally chocolate shavings or nutmeg. According to Daphne, he would "eat a worm if [she] gave it a French name," while Frasier at one point says, "I'm a teamster compared to you!"

Also like his brother, Niles is highly intelligent. His IQ is 156, well over the Mensa threshold, and much higher than Frasier's (129). Unlike Frasier, however, Niles has a long list of phobias and medical conditions, many of which are clearly psychosomatic. Most prominently, he is quite mysophobic, given to wiping his hands after human contact and wiping down chairs in public places before sitting on them; it is revealed in one episode that the root of this is a babysitter (Ronee Lawrence) who told him scary stories about earwigs that would crawl in through his ears and eat his brains, and lay their eggs on furniture. (When he tells this and other contamination horror stories to a group of fourth-graders, they think he is wonderful for knowing such "cool" facts.) His nose begins to bleed whenever he tells a lie or acts against his code of ethics, and he faints at the sight of his own blood. When extremely stressed, Niles is prone to panic attacks and fits of hyperventilation. On more than one occasion, he's fainted. In one episode, he discloses that stress makes him want to hide under a piano. While divorcing his wife Maris Crane, he suffers from stress-induced narcolepsy.

Physically weak and very uncoordinated, Niles is seemingly hopeless at sports and video games, barely able to catch objects even after simple throws (unless Daphne, or occasionally Martin, is doing the throwing; then he is remarkably nimble). However, in some episodes he is shown to be fair at basketball. On one occasion, while attending a basketball game, he is invited onto the floor to attempt a shot from half-court; he makes the basket, astonishing himself, Frasier, and Martin, and earns the temporary nickname "Half-Court Crane." The brothers are often seen coming or going to squash matches, though Martin once commented in disbelief, "You have to wonder what goes on at that squash court!" Accompanying Martin on the shooting range one day, Niles discovers that he is an excellent marksman. He is a fair fencer, and has had some lessons in kickboxing. On other occasions he has expressed interest in lifting weights and taking karate lessons, but these ventures are typically laughed at by his father and brother and often amount to nothing. He is also a master speller, having come close to winning the national spelling competition as a youth and spell-checking the graffiti in a bathroom stall at a local coffee bar with a red marker.

When Niles suffers a walking heart attack, he is not aware of it for several days, because he experiences referred pain and believes he has a toothache. After a dental checkup finds nothing wrong, Frasier's producer Roz Doyle tells him that it is probably a sinus infection, but he considers the remote chance that the problem may be his heart. When a number of extremely unlikely events occur to or around him, he consults a doctor and immediately enters a hospital for surgery.

Niles drives originally a Mercedes-Benz E320 with the license plate 5HR1NK, while Frasier drives BMW models. However, following his costly divorce from Maris, his Mercedes is repossessed and he has to drive a Geo Metro hatchback that he's embarrassed to drive and refuses to let Frasier see him drive it. After he begins a relationship with Daphne, he begins driving a newer-model Mercedes-Benz E55 AMG. Near the end of the series, he upgrades into a newer-model E500.

== Role in the series ==
Niles is Frasier's constant companion and rival. The tensions between the brothers began during childhood; Frasier resented the younger Niles distracting their mother from paying attention to him, and Niles disliked the older Frasier reaching career and life milestones first. Nonetheless, they meet every day at Cafe Nervosa, where they discuss their lives and various other topics, with both siblings relying on each other for advice. Niles and Frasier often collaborate on projects, which frequently and comically lead to complete disaster. Some examples are the book—ironically, about sibling rivalry—that they attempt to write, the restaurant they purchase and attempt to transform into an exclusive eatery, and Frasier's brief period in private practice next door to Niles's office. David Hyde Pierce said that "Niles is Frasier, if Frasier had never left Seattle".

=== Relationships ===
His romantic life – which is plagued by misfortune – is another area explored throughout the series. Niles's first wife is Maris Crane, the haughty, anorexic daughter of a wealthy Seattle family, who is never seen on the show, despite being referred to in nearly every episode during his relationship with her. Season 1 references that Niles married for money. Similar to Niles, Maris has a long list of allergies, being allergic to most meats, spices, creams and more. She also has lots of pills and medication which usually have comical side effects such as extreme narcolepsy. Despite being predominantly an anorexic, in one episode she is shown to be eating loads of doughnuts and growing vastly in weight. Maris demonstrates her extremely paranoid and controlling nature throughout the series. Her lack of respect and affection for Niles leads to separation, followed by serving Niles with divorce papers as a bluff; when Niles signed them she was shaken and agreed to couples counseling. However, after appearing to make progress, Niles discovers Maris is having an affair with their couples' therapist, Dr. Shenkman, ultimately leading to him making the second and final decision for divorce. Maris attempts to reconcile with him by sending him expensive gifts, but Niles remains steadfast in his decision for divorce and Maris responds by shredding their financial settlement document – she turns it into the wrapping paper for her final gift to Niles – a five-cent piece in a jeweler's box along with the poem 'Roses are red, your heart is fickle, when I'm through with you, all you'll have is this nickel' – and proceeds to nearly bankrupt Niles. He is forced to sublet his suite at the Montana and move into the low-rent Shangri-La; while it is far below his usual standard of living, he realizes it is the price he must pay for being free of Maris. After hiring divorce attorney Donny Douglas to end the bitter, drawn-out process, she finally agrees on a settlement when he threatens to expose that her family's wealth is not in timber lands but in urinal cakes. A running gag involves Niles speaking affectionately about Maris, despite her poor treatment of him. Despite her physical and mental handicaps, Maris is revealed to be quite good in bed when "properly motivated," as Niles mentions in season 2 in the episode "Daphne's Room", after Niles buys her a Mercedes as a birthday present.

Niles's most significant relationship on the show is with Daphne Moon, his father's physical therapist, perhaps an unlikely attraction given the significant differences in their tastes, temperament and social standing (he at one point refers to her as a "working-class Venus"). His infatuation for her begins the moment they meet. For numerous reasons during the first six seasons of the show, however, Niles is unable to confess his feelings for Daphne, who remains unaware of his love for her (despite her professed psychic abilities).

After divorcing Maris, Niles becomes involved with Mel Karnofsky, Maris' plastic surgeon; despite being more compatible than his ex-wife, Frasier nonetheless can see Mel's true colors in her subtle yet masterful manipulation of Niles's affections towards her. The two elope after dating less than six months, but the marriage falls apart after only two days when Niles finally confesses his love for Daphne. His confession occurs the night before her wedding to Donny. The relationship spawns a huge ordeal, prompting Donny to respond by suing both Daphne and Frasier, while Mel forces Niles to participate in a prolonged charade of a happy marriage for the sake of appearances. He goes along with it until he finally loses his temper and shouts out the truth during an important dinner party – that his marriage to Mel is a sham and he refuses to put Daphne through the torture of hiding their love any longer.

Niles's feelings for Daphne are the basis for many gags on the show, including the numerous ways he demonstrates how besotted he is with her (such as being entranced by the smell of her hair or staring at her rear end when she bends over), but develops over the course of the series into an important plot line.

Niles is frequently jealous of Daphne's boyfriends (and even his own nephew, Frederick, who nurses a crush on Daphne as a pre-adolescent). Niles does tell Frasier repeatedly that he is over Daphne when she accepts Donny Douglas' proposal of marriage, and proceeds to marry Mel in a kind of rebound, but admits that he still loves Daphne on the eve of her wedding, Frasier tells him that Daphne knows of Niles's feelings and reciprocates them. When the two do attempt a relationship, they must reconcile their many lifestyle differences. Fortunately, in the end the couple finds compatibility, and many of Niles's nervous eccentricities diminish as he finally manages to maintain a stable relationship.

After Niles and Daphne begin dating, this high degree of infatuation was used to incorporate Jane Leeves' real-life pregnancy and weight gain. Daphne feels pressured to live up to the 'perfect' image Niles had imagined; she responds by overeating and gains 60 pounds. Leeves' maternity leave was written into the show in an arc where Daphne reaches her breaking point and realizes she needs help for her weight problems, so Niles sends her to a health spa where she can lose weight and receive counseling. However, her therapist at the spa told Daphne that her overeating was due to her attempting to live up to Niles's "perfect image", and Frasier points out to Niles that he may not have been in love with Daphne, but at Daphne, focusing only on her virtues and ignoring all her flaws. Niles and Daphne then end up insulting each other about their flaws, ending with them kissing passionately.

Ultimately Niles and Daphne are together one year before Niles proposes in the ninth season. The two leave to elope in Reno, Nevada at the end of season 9, after Niles tries to reconcile Daphne's mother and father. His plan ends in failure, leaving Daphne in doubt about married life, since her mother and father's marriage ended after 40 years together. However, Daphne's father reveals that no matter how many times he tried to get rid of Niles from his pub, Niles kept coming back until he finally agreed to come back to America with him all in an effort to make Daphne happy; an extreme act of love that he himself (Daphne's father) never did for her mother. With the sudden realization that Niles's love runs so deep that when he says he'd do anything for her, he literally means it, Daphne goes over to Niles's apartment in the spur of the moment and demands he marry her right then and there, saying, "Because you'd do anything, even put up with my insane family to make me happy. Because you traveled half way around the world to make my dreams come true, even the impossible ones. And because I can't spend one more second without being your wife, Niles Crane, because I adore you." The two then leave in the night to go and find a place to wed.

The series ends two years into their marriage with the birth of their son, David, who is born at a veterinary clinic. A flash-forward scene in an earlier episode reveals that the couple will have two daughters, however these daughters are not seen, heard or referenced in any way in the later revival series.

Niles' final line in the series, which he says to Frasier as his brother leaves Seattle, is "I'll miss the coffees." Whilst Niles did not appear in the revival series, he is referenced in many episodes, and Niles and Frasier briefly share a phone call (of which we only hear Frasier's end) during Frasier's ill-fated lavish Christmas party. In a later episode, it is revealed that (circa 2024) Niles and Daphne now live in Sedona, Arizona, where they have purchased a vineyard.
