= Frasier season 8 =

Frasier
- Season 8
- DVD cover
- Showrunner: Dan O'Shannon
- Starring: Kelsey Grammer; Jane Leeves; David Hyde Pierce; Peri Gilpin; John Mahoney
- No. of episodes: 24

Release
- Original network: NBC
- Original release: October 24, 2000 – May 22, 2001

Season chronology
- ← Previous; Season 7 Next → Season 9

The eighth season of the American television sitcom Frasier aired on NBC from October 24, 2000 to May 22, 2001.

== Cast ==
=== Main ===
- Kelsey Grammer as Frasier Crane
- Jane Leeves as Daphne Moon
- David Hyde Pierce as Niles Crane
- Peri Gilpin as Roz Doyle
- John Mahoney as Martin Crane

=== Recurring ===
- Edward Hibbert as Gil Chesterton
- Patrick Kerr as Noel Shempsky
- Tom McGowan as Kenny Daly

=== Special guest ===
- Saul Rubinek as Donny Douglas
- Jane Adams as Melinda Karnofsky Crane
- Jean Smart as Lana Gardener
- Anthony LaPaglia as Simon Moon
- Alan Tudyk as Todd Peterson
- Victor Garber as Ferguson
- Teri Polo as Abby Michaels
- Gary Cole as Luke Parker
- Kim Coles as Mary Thomas
- Bess Armstrong as Kelly Kirkland
- René Auberjonois as Professor William Tewksbury
- Derek Jacobi as Jackson Hedley
- Fisher Stevens as Dr. Sheldon Morey
- Patricia Clarkson as Claire French
- Tom Verica as Jim

=== Special appearance by ===
- John Glenn as himself (Episode: "Docu.Drama")

=== Guest ===
- Tushka Bergen as Miranda
- Trevor Einhorn as Frederick Crane
- Patrick Macnee as Cecil Hedley
- Charlotte Ross as Monica
- Illeana Douglas as Kenny's Wife
- Barbara Babcock as Penelope Janvier
- John Michael Higgins as William
- Jennifer Coolidge as Frederica
- Brian Klugman as Kirby Gardner
- Bebe Neuwirth as Lilith Sternin

== Episodes ==
No. overall	No. in season	Title	Directed by	Written by	Original release date	Prod. code	U.S. viewers (millions)
169	1	"And the Dish Ran Away with the Spoon"	Pamela Fryman	David Angell & Peter Casey	October 24, 2000	803	28.64
170	2	"And the Dish Ran Away with the Spoon"	Pamela Fryman	David Angell & Peter Casey	October 24, 2000	804	28.64
Niles and Daphne flee Daphne's wedding in Martin's Winnebago, but only reach the end of the road before turning back to confront the situation. In the aftermath, Donny sues Daphne for breach of contract, adding Frasier to the suit when he discovers Frasier's involvement in making Daphne and Niles aware of their feelings for each other. Mel agrees to grant Niles a divorce, but only if he appears to be a devoted husband in public for a period of time so as to minimise her embarrassment. This means that Niles and Daphne cannot be seen in public together. To compensate for this, Frasier arranges for the couple to have a romantic dinner on the rooftop for their official first date.
171	3	"The Bad Son"	Sheldon Epps	Rob Hanning	October 31, 2000	801	18.62
Frasier spies an attractive woman while traveling on a bus in the rain. He gathers that her name is Miranda (Tushka Bergen), and she works at a retirement home called The Colonnade. He visits the home under the pretext of considering putting Martin in there. He later learns that his father has filled in the application. Niles and Daphne have planned a romantic dinner together, hoping to watch a meteor shower. Frasier moves them onto the roof of Elliott Bay Towers, so that he and Miranda can have some privacy. In the course of the evening, the door onto the roof closes, separating Niles and Daphne until the night watchman arrives.
172	4	"The Great Crane Robbery"	Katy Garretson	Gayle Abrams	November 14, 2000	802	18.16
The new owner of KACL is a young computer billionaire, Todd Peterson (Alan Tudyk). Todd considers himself unstylish and lacking in social graces. He is in awe of Frasier's own apartment and sense of style, so Frasier offers to act as his mentor. Todd then meticulously copies Frasier's clothes, car and apartment layout. Meanwhile, Mel demands that Niles be seen to drive her away, by behaving badly in public.
173	5	"Taking Liberties"	Kelsey Grammer	Sam Johnson & Chris Marcil	November 21, 2000	808	18.06
Frasier hires Ferguson (Victor Garber), a classically trained and refined Englishman from a long line of butlers, to live in the Crane household. When hearing of Daphne and Niles' clandestine relationship, he expresses a belief that social class remains too strong a presence in such relationships, inevitably dooming them to failure. Frasier holds a pre-opera party, hoping to seal his place on the opera board. Niles arrives to go on a date with Daphne, but Mel has been invited to the party at the last minute. Daphne begins to fear that Niles will not risk his social standing for her, but he declares in front of the party guests that he does not love Mel.
174	6	"Legal Tender Love and Care"	Pamela Fryman	Saladin K. Patterson	November 28, 2000	809	17.85
Frasier has hired an expensive lawyer, Abby Michaels (Teri Polo), to represent him and Daphne in the lawsuit that Donny is bringing against them. Donny drops the suit soon afterwards. Frasier asks Abby out on a date, and she accepts, but when he receives her bill, he cannot help feeling that he is being overcharged. While out at dinner with Frasier, Niles, Martin and Abby, Daphne runs into Donny, who announces that he is engaged again.
175	7	"The New Friend"	Scott Ellis	Bob Daily	December 5, 2000	807	16.37
Roz is dating a man called Luke Parker (Gary Cole), who lives on a boat, having dropped out of Harvard and sailed around the world in search of adventure. He and Frasier get on well, and Frasier starts to help Luke write his memoirs, but when Roz breaks up with Luke, he must also break off their friendship.
176	8	"Mary Christmas"	Pamela Fryman	Eric Zicklin	December 12, 2000	805	15.87
It is nearly time for the Seattle Christmas Parade, and Frasier, who as a child viewed this event as marking the official start of Christmas, is keen to co-host the KACL coverage with Kelly Kirkland (Bess Armstrong). He ingratiates himself by inviting her for a meal at his apartment, and prepares dishes that have featured in her Channel 6 show. She is very happy to give him the job, but the following day Kelly announces that she has food poisoning and is unable to host at all. Frasier finds himself co-hosting with Dr. Mary Thomas (Kim Coles), recently returned to KACL by popular demand. Guest Callers: Stephen King as Brian; Wolfgang Puck as Tom
177	9	"Frasier's Edge"	David Lee	Jon Sherman & Dan O'Shannon	January 9, 2001	806	18.10
KACL has nine nominations in this year's Seattle Broadcasting Awards, and Frasier is being given the Stephen R. Shafer Lifetime Achievement Award. He receives some flowers and a congratulatory note from his old Harvard mentor, Dr. William Tewkesbury (René Auberjonois). He begins to worry that the note says "you must be very proud", and not "I am proud of you". He decides to call on Dr. Tewkesbury before attending the award ceremony, to ask him about a possible subtext in the note. There is none; his secretary wrote it for him. However, the ensuing conversation sets Frasier thinking about his achievements, and he suddenly feels a terrible sense of emptiness. Meanwhile, Martin is doing his best to give Niles constant reassurance that, although Frasier is the one receiving an award, Niles is just as successful. Niles is touched, but finds his efforts a little tiresome. Daphne has continued to eat constantly and put on weight, and Niles is the only one who has not noticed. Guest Caller: Neil Simon as Andy
178	10	"Cranes Unplugged"	Sheldon Epps	Lori Kirkland	January 16, 2001	813	17.86
In the wake of his conversation with Dr. Tewkesbury, Frasier has decided to stop defining his success by his career, and to focus on his son. To this end, he invites Frederick to stay for the weekend, and makes several plans for edifying activities. He is disappointed when Frederick, now thirteen, arrives and shows no interest in spending time with his father. He prefers watching MTV, playing on his Game Boy and talking on the phone with his friends. Frustrated, Frasier decides to take his son on a camping trip, so they can bond away from all electronic distractions. When Frederick protests Frasier decides to bring Martin as well. Meanwhile, Daphne is trying to set Roz up with Niles' squash partner, an attractive surgeon called Jack, but Roz is distressed when he cancels at the last minute, claiming a medical emergency. Guest Caller: Melissa Etheridge as Cleo
179	11	"Motor Skills"	Pamela Fryman	Story by : Sam Johnson & Chris Marcil; Teleplay by : Eric Zicklin	January 30, 2001	811	17.11
After an embarrassing occasion when Frasier's car broke down and he had to admit to his date that he knew nothing about engines, he and Niles decide to attend an evening class in basic car maintenance taught by Randy (Dave Allen). The experience reminds them of being back at school, but this time they struggle and decide to quit. However, when Daphne and Martin reveal to Niles and Frasier respectively just how proud they are, they wonder if their decision to quit was too hasty. Roz has bought a Dalmatian puppy for Alice and asks Martin for some help looking after him. However, Roz becomes annoyed when Martin starts to become overbearing in his efforts, even to the extent of naming the dog before Alice has a chance.
180	12	"The Show Must Go Off"	Robert H. Egan	Story by : Mark Reisman; Teleplay by : Dan O’Shannon & Bob Daily	February 6, 2001	814	14.23
While attending a science fiction convention for the benefit of his son, Frasier spies Jackson Hedley (Derek Jacobi), an actor whom he remembers from childhood; it was Hedley who first introduced him to the delights of William Shakespeare. Hedley has long since given up the stage and now plays an android called Tobor in a TV show named Space Patrol. Frasier and Niles decide to revive Hedley's career by producing a one-man show for him. Hedley is delighted by the proposition. However, when they see him in action, they realise that he is a dreadful actor, but they had been too young and naïve to perceive this when they were boys. Jane Leeves does not appear in this episode.
181	13	"Sliding Frasiers"	Pamela Fryman	Dan O'Shannon & Bob Daily	February 13, 2001	810	14.69
Frasier is in Café Nervosa trying to decide whether to wear a smart suit or a casual sweater to go speed dating. The episode has two parallel storylines, which interchange throughout. They diverge at the point where he makes the decision: in the first, he chooses the suit, and meets and dates a woman called Monica (Charlotte Ross), who breaks up with him after he treats the relationship too intensely. Daphne decides to cook a special meal for Niles, but accidentally includes an ingredient he is allergic to. As a result, he falls ill which ruins a surprise trip to Cancun he had planned for the two. In the second storyline, Frasier chooses the sweater, and goes speed dating but has a miserable evening. Daphne and Niles prepare for their trip to Cancun, as Fraiser told Daphne about Niles' allergy before she put the ingredient in. Roz arranges a blind date for Frasier, who turns out to be one of the women he encountered speed dating. The two storylines converge when both versions of Frasier, after listening to an enamored caller on a repeat broadcast of his show, decide to make a U-turn towards the restaurant where the caller had mentioned she was the chef and had suggested meeting her there any time. During the credits scene, Martin ends up doing the same thing in both scenarios: relaxing in his chair, drinking beer, and petting Eddie. Guest Caller: Bernadette Peters as Rachel
182	14	"Hungry Heart"	Kelsey Grammer	Gayle Abrams	February 20, 2001	812	16.61
Kenny appears at Frasier's apartment in a panic, and explains that he has a date with a woman, Janis, who he met in a bar. Frasier, realizing that Kenny does not want to jeopardize his marriage, offers to go to the restaurant and make his apologies to Janis. But Janis left a message on Kenny's answering machine at home, and Kenny's wife (Illeana Douglas) went to the restaurant, chased Janis away, then sat and waited for her husband. Frasier arrives, and assumes that she is Janis, and she decides not to tell him the truth. They end up dining together, and Frasier believes he has saved Kenny's marriage. However, when they decide to meet again, Kenny starts to suspect that his wife is having an affair. Meanwhile, Daphne has now gained so much weight that even Niles cannot ignore it, especially when she has a fall in the apartment and it takes all three Crane men to lift her back up.
183	15	"Hooping Cranes"	Kelsey Grammer	Jon Sherman	February 27, 2001	815	12.91
Frasier receives four free tickets to a Seattle SuperSonics basketball game from a grateful caller and Martin is delighted, thinking his son put a lot of effort into getting them. They both go with Niles to the game, and Martin sells the fourth ticket. Niles's seat number is selected to attempt a shot at the basket at half-time with the chance to win a pickup truck. He makes the shot, and spends the next few days enjoying the fame. Frasier soon becomes annoyed at all the glory Niles is receiving for a fluke shot. Meanwhile, Roz has started dating a Frenchman who speaks no English. Jane Leeves does not appear in this episode.
184	16	"Docu.Drama"	David Lee	Sam Johnson & Chris Marcil	March 6, 2001	816	17.72
Roz has the chance to create her own documentary, and she has decided to use the theme of outer space. Frasier persuades her to let him act as narrator, assuring her that he has no problem working for her for a change. However, at the first meeting they have with the scriptwriters, Frasier makes many suggestions and Roz dismisses them all. This leads to an argument, in which she accuses him of being overbearing and he quits the program. The atmosphere between them is tense for a while afterwards, with neither agreeing to apologize or back down. Then Roz announces that she has replaced Frasier with former astronaut John Glenn. Frasier is furious, but determined to prove that she was shutting him out deliberately. Meanwhile, Martin and Niles decide to build a kite together for the recently reinstated spring kite festival. They are extremely proud of their dragon, but Martin forbids Niles from testing it outdoors. Niles, however, cannot resist the temptation of the balcony. Jane Leeves does not appear in this episode. Guest Caller: Hal Prince as Fred
185	17	"It Takes Two to Tangle"	Wil Shriner	Rob Hanning	March 27, 2001	817	15.67
Bryce Academy is in danger of closure, and Frasier and Niles are desperate to find benefactors to help save their old school. Having no success with alumni, they decide to organize a party for some wealthy friends of theirs. Among the guests is Penelope Janvier (Barbara Babcock), a rich widow with her own foundation. Martin meets her first, and she asks him out, much to his sons' surprise, although they realize this could prove useful to them. They are even more surprised some time later, when Martin returns from dinner with Penelope, and has another woman with him called Estelle. He announces that he plans to juggle the women, as he has seen Frasier do. Jane Leeves does not appear in this episode.
186	18	"Forgotten But Not Gone"	Pamela Fryman	David Lloyd	April 17, 2001	818	13.30
On the night of Niles' inauguration for a second term as Corkmaster of the Wine Club, Frasier arrives late and announces his resignation. He plans to host a new segment on KACL at the end of Gil Chesterton's Restaurant Beat, called the Wine Corner, and he prefers not to do both. Frasier invites the members of the club to call into the show to enliven the discussion. He is subsequently disappointed to receive no calls from them. He discovers that Niles, annoyed at being upstaged at his inauguration, is using a rule in the Wine Club constitution to prohibit all Wine Club members from calling in. This leads to a rift between the brothers, which Martin refuses to tolerate. He, meanwhile, has a temporary new physical therapist called Frederica who works him very hard but provides excellent food. Jane Leeves does not appear in this episode.
187	19	"Daphne Returns"	Pamela Fryman	Dan O'Shannon & Bob Daily	May 1, 2001	819	17.57
Daphne is returning home from the weight spa after her recent struggles with weight. She reveals that her therapist, Gloria, informed her that her weight gain stemmed from her own insecurity about her relationship with Niles. Niles is hurt and defensive. The next day, Frasier visits Niles at his office to help sort matters out. He suggests to Niles that Gloria’s advice might be sound, as Daphne has seven years of Niles’ fantasy to live up to; Niles insists, however, that he has a realistic appraisal of Daphne and her virtues. Niles and Frasier revisit several previous episodes in flashback (later incarnations of the characters are edited into the original scenes with chroma key compositing). It soon becomes clear that, contrary to his protests, Niles has placed Daphne on a pedestal and has formed an unrealistically idealized impression of her and her virtues. Niles is shaken. Frasier suggests that this is because Niles is afraid of embracing the real, flawed Daphne in case her flaws prove too much for the relationship to survive, thus resulting in Niles having spent the previous seven years pining for nothing more than a dream.
188	20	"The Wizard and Roz"	Sheldon Epps	Saladin K. Patterson	May 8, 2001	824	14.50
Frasier has been receiving some informal therapy from Dr. Tewkesbury, his old Harvard mentor, whom he holds in the highest esteem. He runs into him unexpectedly one day at Café Nervosa, and introduces him to Roz. He is subsequently startled when, calling round to Roz's apartment a few days later, he finds Dr. Tewksbury there with Roz, wearing one of her robes. After that, Frasier cannot get the image of his esteemed mentor in a silk robe out of his head. Daphne makes Niles promise not to go to Nervosa after she has a premonition that something bad will happen to him there. She later catches him in there with a coffee, and is very angry. They decide to call in a specialist, who can apply scientific methods to test her alleged psychic abilities.
189	21	"Semi-Decent Proposal"	Katy Garretson	Lori Kirkland	May 15, 2001	820	15.63
While shopping for a DVD player, Frasier meets an attractive woman called Claire (Patricia Clarkson). He soon discovers that she is a friend of Lana, former prom queen of his school whom he dated briefly in the past. Claire confides in him that she is organizing a surprise birthday party for Lana, and asks Frasier if he can bring her, pretending it is a friendly date; Frasier agrees, but only to gain access to Claire, whom he finds more appealing. However, Lana already has someone in mind to match up with Claire, so at the party he has to compete for her attention. Lana is also looking for someone to tutor her son in U.S. History.
190	22	"A Passing Fancy"	Kelsey Grammer	Jon Sherman	May 15, 2001	821	15.63
Lana has agreed to ensure that Frasier gets a chance with Claire, if he tutors her son Kirby (Brian Klugman) in U.S. History so that he gets a passing grade. Frasier finds Kirby difficult to motivate, until he introduces him to Roz. They come to their own arrangement: Kirby promises to study hard if Frasier can persuade Roz to accompany him to his prom. Roz has already asked Frasier for a particular day off, so she can queue for tickets to a Bruce Springsteen concert, and he has refused. Now, therefore, he offers to get the tickets for her if she will do this for Kirby.
191	23	"A Day in May"	Kelsey Grammer	Eric Zicklin & Lori Kirkland	May 22, 2001	823	17.88
Frasier is reluctantly helping Lana as she tries to sell a house, despite the depressed owner driving away all potential buyers. Niles and Daphne take Eddie for a walk in the park, and Niles meets Jim, an attractive dog owner whom Daphne sees there often. Martin is attending the parole hearing of the man who shot him years ago.
192	24	"Cranes Go Caribbean"	Kelsey Grammer	Mark Reisman & Rob Hanning	May 22, 2001	822	17.88
Frasier is planning to take Claire on a trip to Belize. He has a collection of brochures which Martin finds, and he also decides to go, hoping to do some fishing. Frasier discusses the plan with his brother, and Daphne overhears and assumes Niles is planning to go with her, to celebrate one year of their relationship. In the end, they all go, but Frasier and Claire arrive late after missing their flight; Lana drove them to the airport and her impatient driving caused an accident. Frasier has increasing difficulty enjoying himself, arriving late and discovering that his special room has been given away, that his restaurant table is gone, and that most of the fish on the menu has run out. Martin, however, has great fun fishing, and Niles and Daphne sample the experience of public nudity, not realizing that there is a fisherman nearby with a telescopic camera lens. After dreaming he is in bed with Lana, Frasier calls Lilith for psychological advice.
