= The Matchmaker (Frasier) =

- Frasier episode
- Episode no.: Season 2 Episode 3
- Directed by: David Lee
- Written by: Joe Keenan
- Original air date: October 4, 1994

Guest appearance
- Eric Lutes as Tom Duran

Episode chronology
← Previous "The Unkindest Cut of All"	Next → "Flour Child"
- Frasier (season 2)

"The Matchmaker" is the third episode of the second season of American sitcom Frasier. The episode aired on October 4, 1994 on NBC. It was Joe Keenan's first episode produced on the show, after which he became a regular writer and eventually executive producer. It won a GLAAD Media Award for its lighthearted satire of the various stereotypes surrounding gay men. It was also a breakthrough performance for Eric Lutes, leading to his casting as a regular on Caroline in the City.

== Plot outline ==
After a late-night false fire alarm, caused by Daphne smoking a cigarette in her room, she confesses that she's been feeling depressed and lonely. The next day at the cafe, Frasier makes the mistake of telling Roz, who immediately offers to set Daphne up with one of her many ex-boyfriends. Frasier is unable to conceal his low opinion of Roz's taste in men, and she storms out, insulted.

While trying to apologize to her, he explains that he is looking for a man who's not just handsome, but also intelligent and successful. At this point, the station's new manager, Tom Duran, appears, having caught only the last part of Frasier's comments. Tom recently returned from a long stay in the UK and ended a relationship. After a few minutes of conversation, Frasier invites Tom to dinner at his apartment. Unbeknownst to Frasier, Tom is gay and assumes that Frasier is hitting on him. He tells Roz that word of his sexuality must have spread and reached the gay members of the staff. Roz, who is still angry with Frasier, does not enlighten him.

When Tom arrives for dinner, Daphne is pleased, but over the course of the evening, almost everything Frasier says is misinterpreted by Tom:

- When Tom mentions how nice the view from his apartment is, Frasier mentions that it's better from the bedroom.
- When Tom asks if it gets awkward having Martin around when he brings dates home, Frasier says his only problem is Martin trying to steal them.
- Niles joins the party and his demeanor leads Tom to assume Niles is also gay. (Later, "So, wait a minute, this Maris guy he kept mentioning is a woman?")

As the evening goes on, Daphne is enthralled with Tom; Niles becomes jealous. Noticing this, Tom takes Niles aside and asks if he has some problem with Tom dating Frasier. Niles shares the joke with Martin. Tom asks for some "one-on-one" time. While Daphne is out of the room, Niles pulls Frasier aside and tells him the truth. Frasier nervously re-enters the apartment and has to confess the truth, sending a disgruntled Daphne back to her room in a sulk. He apologizes to an incredulous Tom, who accepts, good-naturedly.

In the tag, Frasier and Daphne are both smoking cigarettes and drinking cognac in the living room, late at night.

== Awards ==
- David Lee — Directors Guild of America Award for Outstanding Directorial Achievement in Comedy Series
- David Lee — Primetime Emmy Award for Outstanding Directing for a Comedy Series
- Joe Keenan — Writers Guild of America Award for Episodic Comedy
- GLAAD Media Award — Best Comedy Episode (1995)
