= The Good Son (Frasier) =

Pilot episode of Frasier

- Frasier episode
- Episode no.: Season 1 Episode 1
- Directed by: James Burrows
- Written by: David Angell; Peter Casey; David Lee
- Production code: 40571-001
- Original air date: September 16, 1993

Guest appearances
- Linda Hamilton as Claire (guest caller); Griffin Dunne as Russell (guest caller)

Episode chronology
← Previous —	Next → "Space Quest"
- Frasier season 1

"The Good Son" is the pilot episode of the television sitcom Frasier. It aired on September 16, 1993, on NBC. It introduces the primary characters and settings, and distances itself from its parent series Cheers.

The final draft of the script was published on April 29, 1993. Excerpts from the show were promoted as the series finale of Cheers aired on May 20, 1993. This episode set up a number of recurring gags for the series, such as Martin's Lazyboy recliner and the unseen character of Maris Crane, Niles' wife.

== Plot ==
Six months after the conclusion of Cheers, Dr. Frasier Crane is divorced from Lilith Sternin and has moved back to his hometown of Seattle, Washington, looking for a fresh start. Since the move, Frasier has been hosting a talk-radio show on KACL 780 AM Talk Radio as an on-air psychiatrist, alongside producer Roz Doyle.

Frasier is approached by his brother, Niles, who informs him that their father, Martin, a retired police officer injured in the line of duty, can no longer live by himself due to his injuries. In hopes of renewing their father-son relationship, Frasier offers to take his father in.

Martin moves into Frasier's apartment but Martin brings in his thread-bare recliner and Jack Russell Terrier Eddie, both of which greatly upset Frasier. Some time afterwards, Niles and his unseen wife, Maris, offer to help Frasier take care of Martin by jointly paying for a health care provider. Martin convinces Frasier to hire Daphne Moon, an eccentric immigrant from Manchester, England, who claims to be "a bit psychic", much to Frasier's displeasure. After Daphne says she needs to move in, Frasier, who doesn't want more people living in his apartment, rejects her. This leads to an argument with Martin, which ends with Frasier walking out of the apartment.

The next day at work, Frasier confides his troubles to Roz. She tells him the story of Lupe Vélez, pointing out that although things might not go as planned, they can work out anyway. Frasier then takes his next call, only to find an apologetic Martin on the line. Frasier then reconciles with his father. The next call is from a woman, upset and tearful about breaking up with her boyfriend. Frasier proceeds to tell her the story of Vélez. The episode ends with Daphne, Martin, and Frasier watching TV in his apartment in the evening while Eddie silently stares at a disturbed Frasier.

== Awards ==
- David Angell, Peter Casey, and David Lee won the Primetime Emmy Award for writing this episode.
- James Burrows won the Directors Guild of America Award and the Primetime Emmy Award for directing this episode.
- For his performance in this episode, Kelsey Grammer won the Primetime Emmy Award for Outstanding Lead Actor in a Comedy Series. This was his second nomination in this category and his first win.
