= Lilith Sternin =

Fictional character in the series Cheers and Frasier

Dr. Lilith Sternin, MD
- Cheers / Frasier character
- from the Cheers episode "Sisterly Love" (episode 167, 1989)
- First appearance: Cheers: "Second Time Around" (season 4, episode 17)
- Last appearance: 2023 edition of Frasier: "Freddy's Birthday" (season 1, episode 7)
- Portrayed by: Bebe Neuwirth

In-universe information
- Gender: Female
- Occupation: Psychiatrist
- Family: Betty Sternin (mother); Blaine Sternin (half-brother)
- Spouses: Frasier Crane (ex-husband; 1988–1993, re-enacted in 1992); Brian Patchett (ex-husband; 1994–1998)
- Children: Frederick Crane (son, with Frasier)
- Relatives: Martin Crane (ex-father-in-law); Niles Crane (ex-brother-in-law)
- Religion: Judaism
- Nationality: American

Lilith Sternin (formerly Sternin-Crane), M.D., Ph.D., Ed.D, A.P.A. is a fictional character on the American television sitcoms Cheers and Frasier, portrayed by Bebe Neuwirth. The character first appears as a date for Frasier Crane, though mutual hostility and discomfort cause the evening to end badly. Several months later, Lilith meets Frasier again and, with some help from Frasier's ex-fiancée, Diane Chambers (Shelley Long), they start a romantic relationship, eventually living together, marrying, and having a son, Frederick.

Lilith is depicted as an accomplished and highly intelligent psychiatrist, though with an icy or emotionally distant demeanor others find somewhat unpleasant. In the final season of Cheers, Lilith has an affair with another man and leaves Frasier. The affair later unravels and Lilith returns, seeking reconciliation with Frasier. Although Cheers ends ambiguously with regard to Frasier and Lilith's marriage, at the beginning of the spin-off series Frasier, their divorce has been finalized, with Lilith continuing to raise Frederick in Boston while Frasier has moved back to his hometown of Seattle. Lilith occasionally appears in Frasier, sometimes with Frederick.

== Role in Cheers ==
Lilith debuts in the Cheers episode "Second Time Around" (1986), as Frasier Crane's (Kelsey Grammer) date. It does not go well, with Lilith walking out of the date with disdain at Cheers as a venue and Frasier's activities. In "Abnormal Psychology" (1986), they feel mutual attraction again when he becomes accustomed to her makeover done by Diane Chambers (Shelley Long). At first reluctant to start over again, they then decide to go on another date. For years they live together, as first shown in "Dinner at Eight-ish" (1987). "Our Hourly Bread" (1988) reveals that they wed one month before the episode. In "Smotherly Love" (1992), they re-enact their wedding to please Lilith's mother Betty (Marilyn Cooper), who was irritated that she had not been present for their marriage. In "The Stork Brings a Crane" (1989), Lilith gives birth to Frederick during the taxi ride home after false labor in the hospital.

The tenth-season Cheers episode "I'm Okay, You're Defective" (1991) features two plots: one subplot about Lilith pressuring Frasier to finalize his will and one main plot about Sam Malone's (Ted Danson) concern that his sperm count may be low. The episode's epilogue is described as "Many years later" with an elderly Lilith and adult Frederick (Rob Neukirch) sitting for the reading of Frasier's will. The lawyer opens the sealed envelope and is surprised to find Sam's sperm count report, which turns out stable. In response to the mix-up, Lilith bitterly remarks, "That damn bar."

In the eleventh and final season (1992–93), in "Teaching with the Enemy" (1992), Lilith admits her affair with another man – Dr. Louis Pascal (Peter Vogt). In "The Girl in the Plastic Bubble" (1992), Lilith leaves Frasier, with him contemplating suicide until she promises to him that the marriage can be saved, to live with Pascal in Pascal's experimental underground eco-pod. In "Is There a Doctor in the Howe?" (1993), a depressed Frasier almost has sex with Rebecca Howe (Kirstie Alley) in their bed until Lilith unexpectedly returns. In the following episode, "The Bar Manager, The Shrink, His Wife and Her Lover" (1993), Lilith storms out of the room to go to Cheers, demanding the others tell her how long Frasier and Rebecca have been having an affair. The other characters have no idea as the affair has barely started that very evening. Lilith reveals that the eco-pod experiment with Pascal was a disaster – Pascal turned out to be claustrophobic, among other mental problems – and she abandons the project to return to Boston. Frasier and Rebecca, and eventually Pascal, converge on Cheers in pursuit of Lilith. Pascal, armed with a pistol, demands Lilith return to him, threatening to shoot Frasier and the others. Lilith demands that he shoot her first, which causes him to back down and surrender to police. Although Frasier initially refuses to take Lilith back, her pathetic sobbing wins him over, suggesting a reconciliation can occur.

== Role in Frasier ==
In the spin-off Frasier, Lilith and Frasier have divorced, and Frederick continues to live with Lilith in Boston after Frasier's move to Seattle. In the opening scene of the 1993 pilot episode of Frasier ("The Good Son"), Frasier is hosting his call-in radio show and relates the following:

Six months ago, I was living in Boston. My wife had left me, which was very painful. Then she came back to me, which was excruciating. ...So I ended the marriage once and for all, packed up my things, and moved back here to my home town of Seattle.

Actress Bebe Neuwirth reprises the role of Lilith in several episodes of Frasier. In her debut Frasier episode, "The Show Where Lilith Comes Back" (1994), Lilith calls Frasier during his radio show, which surprises him, and mocks Frasier's psychiatric advice to his callers, especially one who overeats and whom Lilith attempts to help. Later at his apartment, Lilith reminds him about their times together during marriage. They make love at one point, but end up regretting it, strongly indicating no chance of a lasting reconciliation. Throughout the series, Lilith reappears on occasion, often rekindling hers and Frasier's lingering emotional bond, sometimes over concern about the future of Frederick (Trevor Einhorn), who also makes recurring appearances.

A running gag throughout Frasier is that Frasier's father and brother, Martin Crane (John Mahoney) and Niles Crane (David Hyde Pierce), are never pleased to see Lilith. Martin finds her "weird" and usually shouts out in shock when he unexpectedly sees her in his and Frasier's apartment. Niles resents her for mocking the vows at his wedding but forgives her when she apologizes. Lilith's presence frightens Martin's dog Eddie, terrifying the normally defiant dog into obedience. Martin's live-in physical therapist, Daphne Moon (Jane Leeves), who fancies herself as having minor psychic abilities, routinely suffers debilitating headaches when Lilith is in town, citing an evil spiritual presence.

Lilith marries her fiancé Brian (James Morrison), an MIT seismologist who appears in only one episode "Adventures in Paradise, Part Two" (1994). A later episode, "Room Service" (1998), reveals that Lilith is recently divorced from Brian after he came out of the closet. Niles, who a few episodes earlier had also just gotten divorced from Maris, ends up sleeping with Lilith after taking her home. However, the next morning, Frasier shows up and catches them. They end up having a three-way spar analyzing each other's issues.

In "Lilith Needs a Favor" (2003), Lilith visits Frasier in Seattle, asking him to give her a sample of his sperm since she wants to give Freddy a sibling. However, as they arrive at the sperm bank, they both end up realizing that she really wanted to recapture Freddy's childhood and call it off.

Her final Frasier episode is "Guns 'N Neuroses" (2003), where Lilith's colleague Nancy (Christine Dunford), sets Frasier up on a blind date with Lilith, having no idea of their mutual history. However, the two meet up for a drink while Lilith is in Seattle and, when it overruns, they both end up cancelling on the blind date (never learning they had been set up with each other). When the two are interrupted by a loud argument between a young married couple in the next room, Frasier and Lilith successfully resolve the couple's dispute, then spend the night together watching television and finally falling asleep together on the couch. The next morning, they part ways as loving friends without restarting their romance.

Lilith returned in the 2023 edition of Frasier. Frasier and Lilith avoid each other in the wake of the former's returning to Boston, only running into her by chance a few weeks later. In spite of their earlier détente, the pair immediately start sparring verbally, much to their son's chagrin. They nonetheless attempt to share a place in Freddy's life, but after passionately kissing on his bed, they agree to divide the holidays between them so that Freddy never has to deal with the two of them together.

== Creation and development ==
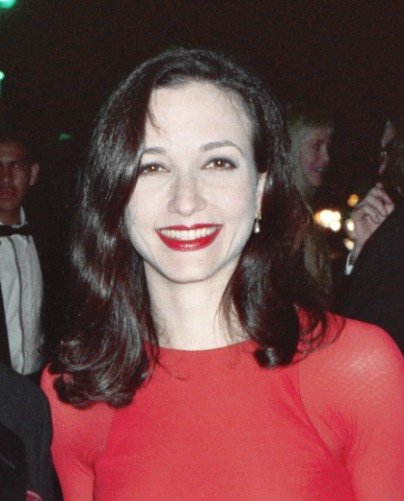
The role of Lilith earned Bebe Neuwirth an Emmy as an Outstanding Supporting Actress in 1990 and 1991.

A stereotypical "intelligent ice queen" Lilith Sternin first appeared in one single scene of a Cheers episode "Second Time Around" (1986; season 4, episode 17), intended as a one-off character. However, she was brought back in the fifth season and became a recurring character thereafter. Over the years, like Diane Chambers, an educated Lilith is often mocked yet "manages to put people in their place."

Cheers and Frasier writers Ken Levine and David Isaacs found the chemistry of Frasier and Lilith "special" enough to compare them with Katharine Hepburn and Spencer Tracy mixed with "Prozac" and to comfortably write stories about. Nevertheless, Neuwirth did not want to appear as a regular player, and left the role of Lilith on Cheers. Neuwirth's career has since been focused on stage work. However, she made several guest appearances as Lilith in the spin-off Frasier.

I find Lilith very innocent, very sweet, very naïve. She's socially inept. She has no idea how to react with other people. She's shy and uncomfortable with people. She's a scientist, she's very analytical, she's very honest. And she loves her husband [Frasier] very, very much. ... And she loves her child Frederick, too.

— Bebe Neuwirth, the Associated Press, May 1992

The Frasier episode "Wheels of Fortune" (2002) reveals that Lilith has a half-brother, Blaine (Michael Keaton), whom Frasier despises due to Blaine's relentless swindling.

== Reception ==
This role earned Neuwirth two Emmy Awards as an Outstanding Supporting Actress in 1990 and 1991.

According to an April 1–4, 1993, telephone survey of 1,011 people by the Times Mirror Center for the People and the Press (now Pew Research Center), before the Frasier premiere and the Cheers finale, Sam Malone (Ted Danson) was voted a favorite character by 26 percent, and Frasier Crane and Lilith Sternin were voted favorites by 1 percent each. In response to a question of spinning off a character, 15 percent of respondents voted Sam, 12 percent voted Woody Boyd (Woody Harrelson), 10 percent voted Norm Peterson (George Wendt), and 29 percent voted for no spin-offs. Only two percent of respondents voted for Frasier Crane to have his own show; his spin-off Frasier debuted in September 1993, to great subsequent success.

Bill Simmons, who at the time worked for ESPN, deemed Lilith Sternin one of his least favorite Cheers characters. Martha Nolan from The New York Times called Frasier and Lilith "repressed" when married together in Cheers. Josh Bell from About.com called Frasier and his ex-wife Lilith Sternin one of the "best sitcom divorced couples" of all time.

Steven H. Scheuer from Sarasota Herald-Tribune considered Lilith's significance to and marriage with Frasier "fun" to watch, especially when, in "Severe Crane Damage" (1990), she used comparisons between "the duller good boy" Frasier and "the interesting bad boy" Sam Malone as "psychiatric examples of the good boy–bad boy syndrome". Faye Zuckerman and John Martin from The New York Times called their marriage in Cheers a hilariously "[perfect mismatch]". Television critic Kevin McDonough from New York praised Kelsey Grammer and Bebe Neuwirth's performances as "repressed individuals" and "separate couple on TV" with "acidic and hilarious" chemistry together.
