= List of Frasier characters =

The main character of the American television sitcom Frasier (1993–2004) and the 2023 revival Frasier is Frasier Crane. Other regular characters include: his father Martin, his brother Niles, producer Roz Doyle, and his father's live-in caregiver Daphne Moon. Other minor characters made regular appearances.

== Main characters ==
- Kelsey Grammer as Frasier Crane, is a pedantic, finicky, scrupulous, and pontifical radio psychiatrist. Growing up with a cultured mother and "Average Joe" father, Frasier is the epitome of upper-class sophistication, yet is still capable of working-class enjoyments. After returning to Seattle from Boston, he begins to embrace his more cultured background but develops a more snobbish and haughty self. It is likely that his reconnection with his brother Niles Crane plays a role in this change. Despite his pretentious demeanour, Frasier has a good heart and strong moral compass.
- Jane Leeves as Daphne Moon (later Daphne Crane), is a Mancunian physiotherapist and live-in housekeeper hired by Frasier to help Martin with his physiotherapy. Daphne's eccentric, working-class background and self-professed psychic abilities (which often end up being correct) frequently lead to Daphne's comical non-sequiturs about her unusual family, to the Cranes' incredulity. Despite her background, Niles falls for her instantly. Niles' obsession with Daphne and her obliviousness of this obsession is developed throughout the earlier seasons of the series.
- David Hyde Pierce as Niles Crane, is Frasier's younger brother, a psychiatrist in private practice. Fastidious, fussy, and far snobbier than Frasier, Niles' pedantic, neurotic qualities provide a foil for Frasier's own idiosyncrasies. He is also loyal, chivalrous, and incredibly loving, which more than makes up for it in the eyes of his loved ones. Niles is very close to his older brother, though their fiercely competitive natures provide much of the humour. Like Frasier, Niles also prefers fine arts, music, and intellectual pursuits to activities like sports, though (surprisingly given Niles' clumsiness and lack of hand-eye coordination) he excels in squash and croquet. Niles is especially mysophobic, given to wiping his hands after human contact and wiping down chairs in public places before sitting on them.
- Peri Gilpin as Roz Doyle, is the producer of Frasier's radio show. Originating from Bloomer, Wisconsin, Roz is an attractive single woman with a euphonious voice much-remarked amongst Frasier's listeners. She has no shame about her serial dating, which is the subject of many jokes and snide remarks, particularly from Frasier's brother Niles and various other characters.
- John Mahoney as Martin Crane, is Frasier and Niles's father, a down-to-earth and unpretentious Seattle police detective who was forced to retire from the force due to a gunshot wound to his hip. Due to this injury inhibiting him from living alone, Martin is forced to accept Frasier's invitation to live with him upon Frasier's return to Seattle. Though his sons share very little in common with him in terms of hobbies and personalities, their relationship deepens over the seasons of the show. Martin's relationship with his Jack Russell terrier, Eddie, beer-drinking (specifically Ballantine), and his pea-green recliner are a perpetual source of irritation for Frasier.

== Crane men love interests ==
As many of the plots on Frasier surround the romantic entanglements of the Crane men, several women have significant minor roles in the series. The more significant of these are listed below, excluding Daphne Moon:

=== Sherry Dempsey ===
Sherry Dempsey (Marsha Mason) is a bartender at McGinty's, Martin's favorite bar, and, for a short time, Martin's girlfriend. Sherry is fun-loving, brash, loud, and crass, and she and Martin share many interests. Frasier and Niles dislike her, but the brothers nevertheless attempt to tolerate her for the sake of family unity. This extends to the point that, when Sherry and Martin split, Frasier attempts to reunite them despite it being against his own interests. Martin and Sherry eventually break up at a bar when Martin wants to marry, but Sherry wants to keep the relationship casual. As father and son watch a basketball game and drink beers at that bar, Martin confides to Frasier that while he wanted to marry Sherry, he could not bring himself to propose as he already knew what her response would be.

=== Faye Moskowitz ===
Faye Moskowitz (Amy Brenneman) is a former lawyer turned pastry chef who is a love interest to Frasier during the sixth season. While Christmas shopping with Roz, he meets Faye's mother. Thinking Frasier is Jewish because she sees him buying a menorah for his son, Mrs. Moskowitz takes a liking to him and hooks him up with Faye. Despite a decent first date, Faye breaks up with him for a while when she embarks on a planned trip to Paris. By the time Faye returns to Seattle towards the end of the season, Frasier is already dating a KACL marketing manager named Cassandra Stone (played by Virginia Madsen). Almost immediately, Frasier finds himself torn between both women, and, although Frasier eventually chooses Faye, he constantly calls her "Cassandra" by mistake. To cover this, Frasier tells her that Cassandra is his aunt. But when Faye learns the truth, she breaks up with him for good.

=== Mel Karnofsky Crane ===
Dr. Melinda "Mel" Karnofsky Crane, MD (Jane Adams) is Maris Crane's plastic surgeon, and for a period, Niles Crane's girlfriend and wife. She is fussy, neurotic, and fastidious, much like Niles. Similarly, she is the sort of manipulative, controlling female Niles is attracted to. Although she and Niles genuinely love each other, everyone else thinks she's a bad influence on him. It is heavily implied in her first appearance that she is much older than she appears, probably due to her profession. Mel also has one son and is divorced. Just two days prior to Daphne's planned marriage to Donny, Niles and Mel impulsively elope. After Niles runs off with Daphne on the day of her intended wedding to Donny, Mel is humiliated and bitter. She pays Niles back by refusing to grant an immediate divorce; instead, she forces Niles to play along that the two remain happily married, assuring him that after he has done this on several select social occasions she will file for divorce. It quickly becomes apparent that she is deliberately prolonging the process while ensuring the maximum public humiliation for Niles. At a social event held by Frasier, Mel finally pushes Niles to the limit; Niles publicly disowns "this sham of a marriage", and the two are quickly divorced.

=== Charlotte ===
Charlotte (Laura Linney), the founder-owner of Charlotte's Web dating service, is a matchmaker recently arrived from Chicago and Frasier's final love interest on the series. Frasier initially hires her to set him up with someone following a particularly grim period regarding his romantic prospects. Charlotte sends Frasier on several bad dates, and he later discovers that she had set him up with random strangers rather than his "ideal matches" as her business was failing, as she had eaten into her savings to establish the business and maintain an image as a successful businesswoman, and as Frasier was her first and only client. When they get to know each other, Frasier finds himself falling in love with her. She eventually returns his feelings, but the relationship is forced to end prematurely when Charlotte, having bought back her old business from her ex-husband, moves back to Chicago. Frasier, initially claiming not to have any regrets about letting her go, accepts a high-paying job offer in San Francisco. The series ends with Frasier on a plane, but it is revealed at the last minute that he had chosen love over career as the plane lands in Chicago, where he hopes to reunite with Charlotte. The pilot of the revival reveals that Frasier and Charlotte stayed together for the next 19 years but she left him around the time of Martin's death, one of the contributing factors to Frasier's departure from Chicago and his subsequent return to Boston.

=== Kelly Easterbrook ===
Kelly Easterbrook (Sela Ward) is only in one episode, Season 5 Episode 1. In the show, she is a supermodel, part-time, in order to support her zoology PhD work. She and Frasier meet on a plane to Acapulco, where Kelly is headed to observe spiny-tailed iguanas. After they spend the night together, she reveals that she is in the process of breaking up with a player from the Seattle Seahawks and "doesn't want any publicity". She does not want anyone to know that she and Frasier are consummating their relationship, and asks him not to tell. He is covert with friends and attempts discretion with his family members, but in both cases it is interpreted as loneliness. He states he is tired of the pity and ends up stating that he met a supermodel in Acapulco who would like him to be discreet. He reveals that it is Kelly Easterbrook, "the lotion girl" as Daphne refers to her. When they do not believe him, he tries to take a snapshot of her in bed with him, prompting her to dump him. Ironically, this is when his family finally sees her.

=== Ronee Lawrence Crane ===
Veronica "Ronee" Lawrence Crane (Wendie Malick) is Niles and Frasier's old babysitter, and the first woman to break Frasier's heart (he used to watch her kiss her boyfriend through the balusters). She is also responsible for Niles' compulsive furniture-wiping, as she told him stories when he was a child about earwigs laying eggs on all the furniture, which would hatch, crawl into his ears, and eat his brain.

In 2003, she meets Frasier by chance and soon starts dating Martin (whom she had a crush on as a teenager). They get married the following year, on May 15 (Eddie's birthday), in the show's final episode, "Goodnight, Seattle". In the revival series, Frasier mentions having gotten some of Martin's things from Ronee, suggesting that they remained married until Martin's death in 2023.

She released an album called Mood Swings, and works as a lounge singer and pianist at the Wellington Club. Ronee drives a red 1959 Cadillac Eldorado. Her traditionally minded, prudish mother lives in Spokane, Washington.

=== Claire French ===
Claire (Patricia Clarkson) is a friend of Frasier's old date / high school prom queen. She appears in season 8. Although his family and friends think she is perfect for him, Frasier's fear of abandonment prompts him to break up with her, leading to a serious evaluation of all his past relationships.

== Crane family members ==
The following are significant members of the Crane family, excluding Frasier, Martin, Niles, and Daphne Crane. Although most of the series revolves around Frasier Crane and his immediate family, occasionally members of Frasier's extended family appear. These are listed below.

=== David Crane ===
David is Niles' and Daphne's son. He was born in the two-part episode "Goodnight, Seattle". During Daphne's pregnancy, it is implied he takes very much after his low-brow maternal uncles (Daphne's brothers); for example, he kicks away classical music and jumps at the mention of a pub. He was born in a veterinary clinic and is named after show's creator David Angell, who died along with his wife Lynn aboard American Airlines Flight 11 during the September 11, 2001 attacks.

David appears in the 2023 version of Frasier as a main character, played by Anders Keith. He is now attending Harvard University, following in the footsteps of his father and uncle by studying psychology. He has inherited his father's mannerisms and neuroses, but his mother's optimistic outlook and cheerful attitude.

In the revival show, David is depicted to be very intelligent like his father, uncle and cousin Frederick, to the point of straight A student, as he is shown having an existential crisis after Frasier gives him a B on a paper, saying he's never gotten a B before, and claiming that Niles would threaten to send him to a "trade school" (what Niles calls University of Pennsylvania). Frasier allows him to do a rewrite, which he does (with help from Frederick), upon which Frasier would grade it and average the two grades together. However, for the second essay, David only gets a B−, so he shows up at Frasier's apartment and threatens to throw him out of a window, saying "I'm not explaining a B to my father!" When Frasier is stung by a bee, David agrees to give him his EpiPen only if he agrees to listen to his oral defense. Frasier agrees, but after listening, only agrees to give him a B+. Later, horrified that he nearly harmed his uncle, David decides to atone for his actions by dropping out of Harvard. Frederick visits him and they briefly discuss "the Crane Curse", of Frasier and Niles always putting high pressure on their sons' academic achievements, and that for the Cranes, "there's always a shinier object just out of reach" and "always having to get the highest grade and win every award". However, Frederick asks David if he's happy at Harvard despite the high expectations placed upon him, and when David says he is, Frederick convinces him not to drop out.

=== Eddie ===
Eddie (born May 15, 1990) is a male Jack Russell Terrier. Eddie was originally played by Moose, and later by Moose's son, Enzo.

Eddie is known for responding to Martin and Daphne with human-like understanding, and often seems to taunt Frasier. In one episode, "Three Dates and a Break Up", Eddie eats the meals Frasier prepared for his dates as if he, Eddie, knew that Frasier's dates would not be staying for dinner. An early recurring gag had Eddie staring unceasingly at Frasier, often wanting something, to Frasier's increasing annoyance. Frasier's ex-wife Lilith is the only one who scares Eddie, and whenever she is around, Eddie does exactly as Lilith says.

In a flashback in the episode "The Return of Martin Crane", Martin (shortly before being shot) is shown having just bought a goldfish named "Eddie". His partner suggests that he should have got himself a dog instead, to which Martin responds that he is not a dog person.

In the series finale, "Goodnight, Seattle", Martin mistakenly reserves the date of a wedding venue, not on the intended day of July 15, but on May 15 - Eddie's Birthday.

=== Frederick Crane ===
Frederick Gaylord Crane (born October 1989; played by twins Christopher and Kevin Graves in Cheers, Luke Tarsitano in 1995, Trevor Einhorn from 1996 to 2003, and Jack Cutmore-Scott from 2023 to 2024) is the son of Frasier and Lilith Sternin. "Freddy" was born in the Cheers episode "The Stork Brings A Crane"; he appears in several episodes throughout the show's run. In the episode "Breaking In Is Hard to Do", which aired a year after his birth episode, he speaks his first word: "Norm!" He lives with his mother in Boston but often comes to visit Frasier in Seattle on the holidays. Through his mother, he is Jewish; his bar mitzvah was most notable for his mother's emotional breakdown and his father's ill-advised attempt to make a speech in Hebrew (but in fact in Klingon) (as seen in the tenth-season episode "Star Mitzvah", which reveals Freddy's middle name, Gaylord). In his first appearance, he has Lilith's hair color, but when he returns, he has Frasier's.

Frederick was born during Cheers' eighth-season episode "The Stork Brings a Crane". He was delivered in a taxicab while Lilith was on her way home from the hospital after an episode of false labor. Lilith tolerated the pain by biting down on one of the cab driver's fuzzy dice. Initially, his personality is very undeveloped since he is just a small child. In early seasons, he is portrayed as having numerous rather debilitating allergies and being rather inexpert when faced with a number of more or less mundane social situations (as seen in the fourth-season episode "A Lilith Thanksgiving"). He is known to be intelligent, achieving high academic scores, and is accepted to the Marbury Academy, an exclusive Boston private school. In addition to his intelligence, he shares several family traits, including a talent for chess and his mother's talent at Machiavellian scheming based on an understanding of behaviorist psychology. He shares his Uncle Niles's lack of coordination and his spelling skill, becoming one of the two final contestants on the National Spelling Championship. As he gets older, more traits begin to develop. At around seven, he develops a crush on Daphne, much to Niles's jealousy. As he gets older, he begins to get somewhat spoiled and surly and enjoys Frasier's company less and less, prompting Frasier to fear a growing generation gap, particularly when Freddy becomes a goth, but father and son are able to bond over their mutual bad luck with the opposite gender. At the end of the series, he is 15 years old.

Frederick's chronologically last appearance in the Cheers/Frasier universe is during the epilogue of the tenth-season Cheers episode "I'm Okay, You're Defective", described as taking place "many years later". It shows an older Lilith and adult Frederick (played by Rob Neukirch) sitting for the reading of Frasier's will.

Frederick appears in the 2023 version of Frasier as a main character, played by Jack Cutmore-Scott. Sometime since the ending of the original series, Frederick, now going by Freddy, was accepted to and dropped out of Harvard, deciding he didn't fit in. He instead took after his grandfather and entered civil service as a firefighter. He missed Martin's funeral because he was suffering from survivor's guilt following the death of his best friend, a fellow firefighter, and has moved in with his friend's girlfriend and infant son to help them financially. Frasier gives him the flag that flew over the Washington State House in honor of Martin. Soon after, he is persuaded to move in with Frasier after the latter buys their apartment building.

=== Hester Crane ===
Dr. Hester Rose Crane, MD (née Palmer; played by Nancy Marchand in Cheers, Rita Wilson in Frasier) was Martin's wife and Niles's and Frasier's mother. By the time the series begins, she has been dead for approximately six years. Hester Crane died in 1987 of lung cancer. Hester appears in a dream sequence (experienced by Frasier in the episode "Don Juan In Hell") and in 8 mm cine transferred to video (in the seventh-season episode "Momma Mia" where Rita Wilson also plays Mia Preston who is the spitting image of Hester).

Hester first appeared (played by Nancy Marchand) in a third-season episode of Cheers ("Diane Meets Mom") in which Hester threatened to kill Diane Chambers if Diane did not stop seeing Frasier. This Hester was duplicitous, manipulative and controlling, more so than the recollections and descriptions of her in the later series. Frasier is surprised by her threats, and says she "has always been the most gentle, rational human being [he] had ever known."

Rita Wilson would play a middle-aged version of Hester in the two-part episode "Don Juan in Hell", using prosthetic makeup.

Hester was a research psychiatrist and met Martin, a cop, in 1952 when she was profiling a murderer. She rejected his first marriage proposal, but the two married when she became pregnant with Frasier. As they did not know better in the 1950s, Hester smoked during at least her first pregnancy. Hester had an affair with a family friend when Frasier and Niles were still children, and she and Martin were subsequently separated for a time.

Hester was the inspiration for both Frasier and Niles to go into the profession. She named her two sons after favorite lab rats. Both her sons take after her more than they do their father, being intellectually pompous, which causes Roz and Martin — especially given her infidelity — to consider that Hester's one-time lab assistant Leland Barton (David Ogden Stiers) might be the boys' biological father. (Without knowing Martin's concerns, Barton reveals he is gay, implying he is not their father). For example, Frasier and Niles quote her as saying "a handshake is as good as a hug." When his snobbish sons embarrass him at "The Timber Mill", a rustic steakhouse chosen by Martin, Martin points out that his wife "may have had fancy tastes, but she had too much class to ever make me or anybody else feel second-rate", and was willing to eat hot dogs and watch ballgames with him. While her sons mostly took after her, certain aspects come from neither Hester nor Martin. According to Martin, both he and Hester always hated sherry, which Frasier and Niles love.

=== Maris Crane ===
Maris Crane is Niles Crane's wife for the first few seasons of the series. She is unseen on camera, but often the subject of plotlines and jokes. Maris is immensely wealthy, much wealthier than Niles, as well as spoiled, dominating, and neurotic. Many of the characters pointedly dislike her (to Niles' consternation), with Frasier contributing in the show's first episode, "I like her from a distance. You know, the way you like the sun. Maris is like the sun ... except without the warmth".

As a child, Maris was overweight, but started losing weight and soon became very thin. She is described as small, very pale, and pathologically emaciated; Roz originally mistook her for a hat rack, and Niles noted that she once sat on a whoopee cushion without setting it off. Her bodyweight is too low to open automatic doors that are activated by a person. According to Niles, she also likes to speak in a fictional language called "G-speak" at parties, something she shares with her Aunt Patrice as mentioned in Season One. She is also mentioned as having a sister named Bree who was born with only one nostril (whom Frasier once went on a disastrous date with).

Maris lived in her family's mansion, which has been in the family for four generations. She claimed they made their fortune from timber, though Niles's divorce lawyer discovers it actually came from urinal cakes. She met Niles during his internship in Seattle when he stopped to help her as she was banging on the electric gates to get into her home. They were married three years later, in 1986.

Maris makes only two onscreen "appearances": once in the episode "Voyage of the Damned" when her shadow is seen through a shower curtain (she is spoken to but makes no reply), and again in "Rooms with a View", where she appears in Niles' memory, almost completely covered by bandages after cosmetic surgery. In "The Seal Who Came to Dinner", the pass-code to Maris's seaside home is described as her "ideal weight", and "what she weighed at her débutante ball" during her pageant years. The series of numbers that Niles punched in would mean that Maris, at that time, was 45 pounds and 12 ounces (20.8 kg). Aside from her low weight, Maris is subject to various medical problems: she has abnormally tight quadriceps, a rigid spine, many and very specific allergies (meats, cream, spices), she cannot produce saliva, and has a slight webbing of her hands that made her self-conscious enough to shy away from their physical touch. She frequently travels to Switzerland for cosmetic surgery and expensive, eccentric health treatments.

In 1993, Maris and Niles refer Frasier to Daphne Moon (Niles' future wife) as a live-in physical therapist for Martin. Two years later, Maris goes shopping to New York (actually to Dallas, the site of the first Neiman Marcus store) without telling Niles, who worries greatly and is then infuriated by her rash, selfish disappearance (with encouragement from Frasier). On her return, Niles finally stands up to Maris, and she promptly kicks him out of the house, beginning a two-year separation. Maris eventually reunites with Niles, but immediately has an affair with their marital therapist, Dr. Bernard Shenkman. In 1998, Niles finally files for divorce. In spite of the finalized divorce, Maris and Niles continue to be codependent for some time, until Niles finally breaks completely free, largely due to Daphne's aggravation.

In 2003, Maris becomes romantically involved with a violent Argentinian polo player, Esteban de Rojo (Victor Alfieri), whom she kills in self-defense. Consequently, she is jailed for a few months on suspicion of murder. In 2004, shortly before her trial is scheduled to begin, she escapes to her family's private island from which she cannot be extradited, effectively stranding her for life.

The character was not originally meant to be unseen. The creators of the series intended to show her after only a few episodes of referring to her, but nothing came of this. The writers of the show decided that they had created so many quirks for the character – both mental and physical – that the character had become uncastable. They therefore decided to make the character permanently unseen.

=== Nikos Crane ===
Nikos Crane (Joseph Will) is the son of Walt and Zora Crane. He is Martin's nephew, and Frasier and Niles' cousin. Nikos was originally going to attend medical school, but became a juggler after receiving some advice from Frasier, about which Zora was quite angry.

=== Walter "Walt" Crane ===
Walter "Walt" Crane (John Mahon) is Martin's brother and the uncle of Frasier and Niles. He appears only once, in an episode in which he and Martin meet again, only to become separated again by the end of the episode. In the episode "Author, Author" when Frasier and Niles are having a fight, Martin tells them a story about a dispute he once had with a partner. His first words are "Now, I never had a brother..." However, the story that Martin tells the boys turns out to be a lie, which he reveals to Daphne after the boys make up and leave.

=== Zora Crane ===
Zora Crane, (Patti LuPone) a Greek woman, is Walt Crane's wife, Martin's sister-in-law, and the aunt of Frasier and Niles, and the one responsible for Walt and Martin's estrangement. Savagely domineering, she is notable for having violent outbursts. According to family lore, when the Nazis invaded Greece, the five-year-old Zora joined the partisans just to strangle Nazis with her jump ropes.

=== Lilith Sternin ===
Lilith Sternin (Bebe Neuwirth) is the ex-wife of Frasier Crane and mother of their son, Frederick. A cold, remote woman, she is disliked by most of his family and friends. Lilith appeared as a prominent character on Cheers, in which Frasier also first appeared. Her relationship with ex-spouse Frasier is polite yet distant in the early seasons, becoming more cordial in the final seasons.

=== Nanette Guzman/"Nanny G" ===
Nanny G is Frasier's first wife and a well-known children's entertainer. She first appeared in the tenth-season episode of Cheers, titled "One Hugs, the Other Doesn't", played by Emma Thompson. She then appeared in the Frasier Season 9 premiere episode "Don Juan in Hell" in a fantasy sequence as a young hippie from Frasier's memory (played by Dina Spybey). Her final appearance was in the final season of Frasier in the episode "Caught in the Act", this time played by Laurie Metcalf, who proclaims, "Do you have any idea what it's like to play the same character for twenty years?!" – an in-joke reference to Grammer's own twenty-year portrayal of Frasier Crane on Cheers, Wings and Frasier (and years later, Metcalf would find herself in the same situation, in the role of Jackie Harris on Roseanne and The Conners). Frasier and Nanette were briefly married while he was an undergraduate; the ceremony occurred at City Hall. The two experienced a strong sexual chemistry, but Frasier claims that the marriage could not work because of their youth and naïveté.

=== Aunt Vivienne ===
An unseen character central to the episode "Beloved Infidel". Her nickname is "The Mouth" and Niles describes her as the "keeper of the Crane family skeletons". When Frasier and Niles suspect Martin of having an affair in their childhood, Niles plans to call her to find out, but Frasier stops him. Niles suggests Frasier is worried what he might find out; he replies "Yes; that she knows where I live and that she still drives!".

== KACL staff and professionals ==
This section outlines the various people with whom Frasier works with at KACL 780 AM (the radio station from which Frasier's show is broadcast).

=== Bob "Bulldog" Briscoe ===
Bob "Bulldog" Briscoe (Dan Butler) hosts the Gonzo Sports Show, KACL's highest-rated show among most demographics. He is a volatile, boorish, intensely macho sports journalist, who often makes the ever urbane Frasier the butt of his jokes. His catch phrase is "THIS STINKS! THIS IS TOTAL BS!", often said after he misplaces something, only to find it immediately afterwards. Bulldog is obnoxiously discourteous and often insults his coworkers, interviewees and callers, yet he is apparently very popular, and receives as much affection and admiration, as angry calls; "Guys love me; chicks pretend not to".

Bulldog is a womanizer, but has somewhat of a lingering crush on Roz. Following a short affair with her, Bulldog reveals his feelings towards Roz to be genuine, but they prove to be unrequited. Due to a decline in ratings, his show is cancelled, and he is fired at the end of season 6, Bulldog works as a pizza delivery man until he is re-hired to work in the KACL archives. He is seen sporadically throughout the remainder of the series, usually appearing with a crude remark or playing a practical joke.

Contrary to his overbearing "machismo", Bulldog has a fear of reptiles and once jumped on a desk in panic when a small lizard got loose in the studio. He also used a pregnant Roz and later his elderly mother as human shields to protect himself from gunmen – the first incident being an attempted hold-up at the coffee shop for which Bulldog was given, and enthusiastically accepted, undeserved praise for his role in foiling, and the second a false shout by Martin to expose this cowardice at an awards ceremony for Bulldog's 'bravery', after Frasier's more subtle attempts to have Bulldog come clean failed miserably.

Bulldog was credited as a regular cast member in several episodes from seasons four through to six, until the character was fired from KACL at the end of season 6. He was then seen extremely infrequently, turning up as a pizza delivery man in a single season 7 episode. Bulldog was not seen at all in season 8; in season 9, KACL re-hired him to work in their filing room, and he was seen very sporadically around the station (and never on-the-air) from that point forward. His last appearance is in the season 11 episode "Frasier-Lite", and is notable for being one of the show's major recurring characters not present at Frasier's farewell speech in the series finale.

Bulldog makes an appearance in a revival series episode, when Frasier briefly came back to Seattle for a KACL anniversary special. It is revealed that since Frasier's departure 20 years ago, he has restarted his sports show and come out as gay (as is actor Dan Butler). However, his personality has not changed and his womanizer behavior has just been redirected towards men - he now has pin-ups of men.

=== Chopper Dave ===
Chopper Dave (Richard Poe) is a Vietnam War veteran who hosts KACL's Eye in the Sky traffic reports. He has a tendency to speak very loudly due to spending time trying to speak over the din of his helicopter. He has also been known to annoy his colleagues by flying his helicopter very close to their apartment windows.

=== Father Mike Mancuso ===
Father Mike (George DelHoyo) is a clergyman who serves as host of Religion on the Line at KACL. He appears or is referenced in various episodes throughout the first two seasons, before being fired by new station manager Kate Costas in the first episode of season 3, seemingly for no reason other than the fact Kate found his show boring – something which concerned Frasier, whose show had similar audience figures.

=== Gil Chesterton ===
Gilbert "Gil" Leslie Chesterton (Edward Hibbert) is the host of Restaurant Beat on KACL. He is a pompous, effeminate, over-refined food-critic whose taste buds are insured. In his first appearance, Gil is somewhat antagonistic towards Frasier and vying for his KACL time-slot, though in subsequent appearances the issue is no longer contentious. Believed by his coworkers to be in the closet, Gil claims to be married to a woman named Deb, a "Sarah Lawrence graduate and the owner of a very successful auto body repair shop", as well as an Army Reservist, but his co-workers believe "Deb" is Gil's pet cat and do not believe the latter, either. Much of the humour related to Gil stems from his adamant denial of his seeming homosexual orientation, as well as his overall catty snarkiness. In a season eleven episode, Frasier is falsely outed on the air, after being seen at a local gay bar; Gil is seen coyly reading a newspaper outside the same bar during the episode's closing-credits before entering the bar. In "The Impossible Dream", Frasier is disturbed to find that he is having overtly sexual dreams about Gil.

Gil drives a red BMW with a red interior and is almost always seen wearing his trademark bow tie. It is also revealed that Gil wears an ankle bracelet. He claims to be a veteran of the armed services (he once refers to having "seen some cruel pranks in the Army"). His last appearance is in the show's two part finale Goodnight, Seattle where he is seen along with Kenny Daly, Roz, Daphne, Bebe, Noel, Martin, Ronee, Niles, and the rest of the KACL staff watching Frasier give his farewell speech.

The character is named in honor of series producer Christopher Lloyd's journalism teacher at Beverly Hills High School.

=== Greg ===
Greg was the station manager in 1997. He is mentioned only in "The 1000th Show".

=== Julia Wilcox ===
Julia Wilcox (Felicity Huffman) becomes the new financial reporter for KACL late in the series' run. She is the author of two books, Practical Applications of Econometrics and Day Trade Your Way Out of Debt, the latter of which had stirred some controversy and had eventually contributed to her being fired from CNBC.

Her no-nonsense, all-business demeanor and arrogant and stand-offish attitude earn her the dislike of the other staff, especially Roz Doyle. Frasier makes an advance toward her in a moment of anger-induced passion, similar to a scene in an episode with Kate Costas, with Frasier even using some of the same insults and quoting a line by Sam Malone to Diane Chambers on Cheers ("Are you as turned on as I am?"), which results in the entire station being forced to attend a sexual harassment seminar. When Julia promises not to sue Frasier or the station, the entire staff walks out from the seminar.

When Frasier discovers that his accountant and former Oxford classmate, Avery (John Hannah), is cheating on his wife with Julia, he confronts Avery, unaware that Julia is hiding in a closet, overhearing the entire conversation. Julia's attitude towards Frasier begins to soften after this display of chivalry on his part, and she uses her connections to have Ben, a British street musician (Elvis Costello) whom Frasier and Niles find annoying, then playing a regular gig at Café Nervosa, offered a full-time job elsewhere.

She and Frasier have a brief romantic encounter, much to Roz's chagrin. Julia and Roz end up verbally attacking each other after Julia suspects Roz's feeling for Frasier. He ends up siding with Julia, causing Roz to take a new position and leave KACL, albeit temporarily. Her boorish and coarse behavior towards Martin, Niles, and Daphne ultimately persuades Frasier to break off their relationship.

=== Kate Costas ===
Kate Costas (Mercedes Ruehl) is one of several KACL station managers before Kenny. Frasier and Kate have a love–hate relationship, finding themselves on opposite sides of programming decisions and union negotiations. They have a brief affair before Kate leaves to accept a management position at a Chicago station in "The Adventures of Bad Boy and Dirty Girl".

=== Kenny Daly ===
Kenny Daly (Tom McGowan) is a long-time radio man; apparently a successful DJ in the past, in 1993 he was reduced to delivering pizzas as he was out of work at the time. Kenny was married with at least three children, but got divorced in 2003, following which he suffered a breakdown.

Kenny becomes the new station manager of KACL in 1998. A likable and relaxed manager, he soon becomes friends with all the staff there. When he took over in "Sweet Dreams", he gave Frasier the ultimatum of doing an ad he could not endorse or be fired. Kenny fires Frasier, but rehires him an hour and a half later. Kenny then goes to station owner Joe Martin to tell him about Frasier's complaint and is fired - however, he is reinstated later in the year. Kenny occasionally performs the unscrupulous acts of his predecessors, such as firing and lying to the talent, but often feels guilty and admits to it shortly afterward. Kenny is fairly lowbrow and has tastes and pleasures similar to Martin Crane, which occasionally grates against Frasier's more refined sensibilities. Kenny resigns as station manager after deciding to go back to DJing, and Roz is appointed as his replacement. He is last seen, along with Frasier's family, friends and KACL staff, watching him do his farewell speech.

=== Joe Martin ===
Joe Martin (Miguel Sandoval) was the station owner in 1998. After being inadvertently inspired by Frasier to take risks, he goes back to his birth name Jose Martinez and turns KACL into an all-Latino music station, resulting in the current KACL hosts (including Frasier) getting fired. The new format does not do well, however, and the old hosts are re-hired in the same year.

=== Ned Miller ===
Ned Miller (John Glover) was the station manager in 1993. He is fired in "Oops", right after it was assumed that Frasier might be the one to get fired, rendering the firing of Frasier null and void. He tapes everything said in his office.

=== Noel Shempsky ===
Noel Shempsky (Patrick Kerr) is a painfully geeky Trekkie who keeps an autographed picture of William Shatner as Captain Kirk on his desk and is fluent in Klingon. His station nickname is "Noel the Mole". He is also good friends with Bill Gates, offering a Vulcan salute to Gates when he appears on Frasier's show in "The Two Hundredth". Noel is such an avid Star Trek fan that William Shatner has a restraining order against him.

He works in sales at KACL and drives a '73 Dodge Polara. He and Roz go out for a drink, and he falls in love with her. In his attempt to win her heart, he gives her a spice rack that he made. Roz, who does not feel the same way about him, was even willing to date a lesbian instead of him once. In the episode "Star Mitzvah" it is revealed that Noel is Jewish, and is fluent in Hebrew.

His claim to fame, as seen when he volunteers to be the station representative during contract negotiations, is that he can faint at will. It has also been mentioned in the episode "A New Position for Roz" that Noel has never missed a day of work. He was even retained by KACL when it changed formats to Salsa radio and fired most of the talk radio personnel, due to his mastery of Spanish and his never ever having a sick day. Noel shows attraction to Roz throughout the series, leading to often embarrassing attempts to impress her. In the final episode, he finally kisses her after she becomes the station manager.

=== Poppy Delafield ===
Poppy (Katie Finneran) is introduced in season 7 as an intern at KACL. She annoys her coworkers with her overly talkative manner and lack of intelligence, and only has her job because her mother owns the station. When Niles gets a job as an arts critic, Frasier becomes jealous and persuades Poppy to ask her mother to start a culture review show on KACL. However, Poppy does not realize that Frasier wants to host the show and ends up hosting it herself, to disastrous effect. Later in the season, she meets Niles and becomes attracted to him. The two set a date to attend an upcoming ball, but due to a series of misunderstandings between them and Frasier, the brothers start to argue and scare away both Poppy and Frasier's date.

=== Thomas "Tom" Duran ===
Thomas "Tom" Duran (Eric Lutes) was an openly gay station manager during the second season. In "The Matchmaker", Frasier unwittingly asks Tom out on a date, intending to fix him up with Daphne. He appears later in the season in "Agents in America, Part III", trying to coax Bebe from jumping off the ledge of the building.

=== Other shows on KACL ===
There have been numerous other shows on KACL, some of which are:

The Gonzo Sports Show — Hosted by Bob "Bulldog" Briscoe.
Restaurant Beat — Hosted by Gilbert "Gil" Leslie Chesterton.
Religion on the Line — Hosted by Fr. Mike Mancuso, canceled by Kate Costas.
Pet Chat with Nanette — Hosted by Nanette, canceled by Kate Costas.
Amber Edwards Book Chat — Hosted by Amber Edwards.
Health Watch — Hosted by Dr. Clint Weber.
Storytime Theater — Hosted by Tooty, the Story Lady.
Teen Scene — Hosted by Trent, Emily and Ryan. The show is featured on the season nine episode "Juvenilia" when Frasier acts as a guest. Despite his initial belief that the show will be an easy ride, he quickly learns that the three hosts have an abrasive, interrogative style of hosting, leaving Frasier feeling exposed and dumbfounded.
The Morning Zoo with Carlos and The Chicken — KACL's morning show hosted by Carlos and Dwayne a.k.a. "The Chicken".
Let's Go Camping — Hosted by Dan and Jenna, disappeared inexplicably.
Dr. Nora — a second advice show on KACL, hosted by Dr. Nora Fairchild (Christine Baranski) (recommended by Frasier), this show lasted for about two weeks.
Dr. Mary — a third advice show on KACL, hosted by ex-temp producer Mary Thomas.
Car Chat with Bob and Bethany — Hosted by Bob and Bethany; Martin mistakes Bethany for a man.
Money Matters — Julia Wilcox (Felicity Huffman), financial reporter, formerly of CNBC, to whom Frasier is forced to devote part of his show. He has a brief affair with her later.

=== Other radio shows mentioned ===
KeKe and Mel's Drivetime Circus — Mentioned by Opera Director Allister Berk (Patrick Stewart) in season 11 episode "The Doctor is Out".

And many other shows (the names of which were not given) but the hosts are:
Ray Schmidt, the "Green Grocer".
Bonnie Weems, the "Auto Lady".
Leo Pascali, the "Happy Chef". In season 3 episode "Leapin' Lizards" the host of The Happy Chef is shown on a schedule as Floyd Lovett.
Miss Judy, Arts and crafts.
Helen Grogan, "Ma Nature".
Chester Ludgate, KACL's "lovable curmudgeon" commentator.

== Moon family members ==
This section discusses the more significant members of Daphne Moon's working-class family, who hail from Manchester, United Kingdom. None of the actors who play Moon family members have specifically Mancunian English accents: Anthony LaPaglia and Richard E. Grant, who portray two of Daphne's brothers, were not born in the United Kingdom (LaPaglia is Australian, and Grant was born in Eswatini). This apparent discrepancy is never addressed on the show, but may be taken as an in-joke (see below).

=== Gertrude Moon ===
Gertrude Moon (Millicent Martin) is Daphne's mother. The two have a difficult and complex relationship, and Daphne appears to dislike her mother immensely while still remaining intensely loyal and subservient to her. Domineering and conniving, Gertrude is doting and always forgiving towards her son Simon's selfish behavior but is hyper-critical of her ever-supportive and long-suffering daughter, frequently guilting Daphne into providing what she wants. When Gertrude leaves her husband, she goes to Seattle. There, she unsuccessfully tries to start a romance with Martin and briefly lives with Niles and Daphne, where she quickly overstays her welcome. When Daphne finally snaps and throws her out, she immediately breaks down with guilt, Niles offers to move her to an apartment of her own so that she can remain in Seattle with her daughter.

=== Grammy Moon ===
Grammy Moon, Daphne's paternal grandmother, is frequently mentioned but never seen or heard from on the show (see also: Maris Crane). She and her numerous eccentricities, cooking tips and health complaints are frequently the subject of Daphne's long-winded stories.

=== Harry Moon ===
Harry Moon (Brian Cox) is Daphne's father. Although he is an alcoholic and a layabout (who supports his drinking via the money given to him by men who attempt to impress their girlfriends by pretending to hit Harry after he pretends to chat up their girlfriends), his relationship with Daphne is closer than the relationship between Daphne and her mother. Seemingly trapped in a long-suffering marriage with his wife, he eventually left her. With Niles' intervention, they attempted a reconciliation, but it was short-lived, and Harry Moon eventually returned to the United Kingdom.

=== Michael Moon ===
Michael Moon (Robbie Coltrane) is a brother of Daphne. Michael appeared in the two-part series finale, "Goodnight, Seattle", and his speech is almost entirely incomprehensible, spoken in a very fast Lancashire accent.

He also briefly appears in "Something Borrowed, Someone Blue" played by a different actor and is mentioned in "IQ" as having lost one of his toes after falling into a frozen lake. In "Goodnight, Seattle", he is revealed to have lost another toe in a shooting incident.

=== Simon Moon ===
Simon Moon (Anthony LaPaglia) is one of Daphne's brothers. An obnoxious and boorish heavy drinker and layabout, Simon has a difficult relationship with his sister, largely because of Simon's uncouth and selfish nature. He is greatly disliked by both Frasier and Niles, partly because of their class-conscious nature but also because when in Seattle he frequently stays with one of them, often taking unreasonable liberties with regard to their homes, possessions and alcohol supplies in the process. Conversely, he gets on quite well with Martin and, despite his many negative qualities, is quite a popular man who is very successful at attracting women.

Roz is quite taken with him (and he with her) at first, but she eventually catches on to his ways and rejects his advances. Simon views her as a sex object, yet always forgets her name. During the ninth-season episodes in which he appears, he constantly calls her "Rose." Roz does not care enough at that point to even correct him.

Simon appears in nine episodes. Like the majority of the Moon family seen on the show, he does not share a Mancunian accent with Daphne: the Australian LaPaglia imitates a London 'cockney' accent. He does, on occasion, wear a Manchester United T-shirt.

=== Stephen Moon ===
Stephen Moon (Richard E. Grant) is Daphne's favorite brother. He appears in person in the series finale "Goodnight, Seattle", and speaks with Grant's trademark RP 'posh' accent, unlike the rest of the Moon family. The character also appears in the two-part episode "And the Dish Ran Away with the Spoon", where he is played by a different actor and has no speaking lines.

=== Billy Moon ===
Only seen briefly during Daphne and Donny Douglas' ill-fated wedding, Billy is Daphne's gay brother, a professional ballroom dancer. In an early episode Daphne states 'he's me mum's favourite. Me dad mostly flicks the crust off his kidney pie at him'. He is not directly stated to be gay, but hints are dropped that he knew from a young age, such as having sneaked peeks at his brother Nigel in the shower, and getting excited by going to the male doctor (even undressing in the car on a visit to the dentist).

=== Nigel Moon ===
Briefly appeared in "Something Borrowed, Someone Blue". According to Daphne, their brother Billy would spy on Nigel in the shower. He was portrayed by Cameron Dye.

=== Peter Moon ===
Briefly appears in "Something Borrowed, Someone Blue".

=== David Moon ===
Briefly appears in "Something Borrowed, Someone Blue". Coincidentally, Daphne names her and Niles's son David (though in memory of series producer David Angell).

== Doyle family members ==
=== Alice Doyle ===
Alice May Doyle (played by Ashley Thomas, 2001–2004) is the daughter of Roz Doyle. She was conceived in 1997, around the time of the fifth-season episode ”Halloween”, where Roz revealed her pregnancy. The character first appeared later that season as a newborn in the episode "Life of the Party", and by the end of the series has become a six-year-old child. Between 2001 and 2004, she was portrayed by Ashley Thomas, who was seven years old when the series ended. She was played a single time by Hope Cruickshank in the 2001 Season 9 episode "Room Full of Heroes", in addition to having been played as a baby by Shannon Curran in the Season 6 episode “IQ.” Her father, Rick Garrett, had only just turned 20 when Roz discovered she was pregnant with Alice, and rather than, as she thought, ruin his life, Roz decides to raise Alice herself and not burden Rick. Alice refers to Niles, Martin and Frasier as her "uncles". A running gag in the show's later seasons involved her desperate desire to be a flower girl at various weddings, but always being prevented at the last minute. She has a mildly adversarial relationship with Daphne's mother Gertrude, and a close relationship with Roz's onetime boyfriend, Roger.

In the revival series, when Roz visits Frasier in Boston over Christmas, she mentions that unlike her, Alice has been going steady with her current boyfriend for four years, and is spending the Christmas with his family.

Alice returns in Season 2 of the revival series, now played by Kelsey Grammer's real-life daughter Greer Grammer. Roz mentions that she has just moved to Providence, Rhode Island to study architecture at RISD and had broken up with her boyfriend. Roz wanted to meet up with her, but she cancelled on her last minute, after she had a date. Alice finally makes a live appearance when she shows up at Cape Cod, where Frasier is currently at a beach house with his son Freddy and nephew David. Alice is shown to have a crush on Freddy, whilst David has an unrequited crush on her. She also attends the Christmas party at Frasier's house.

=== Denise Dawson ===
Denise Dawson née Doyle (played by Suzanne Cryer) is Roz's older sister. Denise appears twice, first in "The Guilt Trippers", where Roz bemoans Denise's perfect life with her handsome husband Craig. However, there are evident cracks in the relationship, and when she next appears in "Sea Bee Jeebies", Denise receives a call from Craig telling her he is leaving her. Denise regularly puts Roz down using back-handed compliments, such as buying Roz a dress two sizes too small and telling her how good she would look in it. She ultimately gets her comeuppance when her husband leaves her for someone else, leading her to hate men.

=== Jen Doyle ===
Jen Doyle (Zooey Deschanel) is Roz's 'pushy and opinionated' cousin who visits her in Seattle. Her judgmental attitude irritates Frasier and Roz finds she cannot maintain the all night partying that Jen prefers. She forms an unlikely friendship with Kenny Daly who is inspired by her spontaneity and passion for traveling in "Kissing Cousins".

=== Joanna Doyle ===
Joanna Doyle (Eva Marie Saint) is Roz's mother. Currently divorced, she is the Attorney General of Wisconsin. Roz frequently speaks to her openly on the phone about very personal matters, to a level that often shocks Frasier. Appeared in the "Our Parents, Ourselves" episode.

=== Rick Garrett ===
Rick Garrett (Todd Babcock) is a waiter at Café Nervosa who, at the age of twenty, has an affair with Roz, which results in her getting pregnant. Guilt-stricken at the news, he impulsively asks Roz to marry him, but Roz declines, insisting that he pursue his college education first. Their child is Alice May Doyle.

== Niles and Maris' household staff ==
This section discusses the significant members of Maris and Niles' household staff who are mentioned on the show. Of these, Marta is significant as the only member of the household staff to have a recurring role in the series, complete with dialogue.

=== Marta ===
Marta (Irene Olga López) is Niles and Maris' elderly maid. She comes from a remote mountain village in Guatemala, and has difficulty with her English pronouns. She speaks fluent German, however, owing to her previous experience working for a German family "who turned up in Guatemala just after the war". In one episode, she translates from German to Spanish, and Frasier (mis)translates from Spanish to English for Niles, leading to comedic misunderstandings, related to a romantic entanglement. She is the only member of "Missy Crane's" household staff to be regularly seen on the show. In the episode Frasier Crane's Day Off from 1994 she is referred to as being 78 years old, meaning she would have been born in 1916.

=== Yoshi ===
Yoshi is Niles and Maris' elderly and temperamental Japanese gardener. He is frequently mentioned by Niles, usually when referring to arguments over the Zen garden Yoshi is keen to build. He is seen once on the series when Niles is addressing staff before leaving Maris. Yoshi dies of a heart attack while trimming Maris' elaborate hedge maze—Niles said, 'the paramedics never had a chance.'

=== Ngee ===
Ngee is Niles' and Maris' housekeeper. He is frequently mentioned by Niles during the beginning of the series. Given that Ngee's name seems rather hard to pronounce, Frasier constantly refers to him as "Guy" (pronounced (French: [ɡi]) – clearly assuming him to be French), thus causing Niles to correct him.

=== Nadia ===
Nadia is referred to as Maris' "hatchet maid" but is never seen or heard.

== Characters from Cheers ==
Characters from the previous sitcom, Cheers, who are Frasier's old friends from Boston, guest star in certain episodes, influencing the episode's outcome (in addition to frequent guests Lilith and Frederick). The only surviving series regular from Cheers that never appeared on the show was Kirstie Alley, who played Rebecca Howe from 1987 to 1993 (seasons 6–11).

=== Sam Malone ===
Sam Malone (Ted Danson) ran the bar (Cheers) that Frasier frequented back in Boston. He appeared on one episode of Frasier, in Season Two, called "The Show Where Sam Shows Up". He is having second thoughts about his wedding to a woman (played by Téa Leoni) whom Frasier had slept with, unknowing that she and Sam were engaged. Sam breaks off the marriage when he finds out she once slept with Cliff Clavin.

=== Diane Chambers ===
Diane Chambers (Shelley Long) left Frasier at the altar during their wedding. She appeared in four episodes, three of which were only dream sequences. In season two, she first appears in a dream that Frasier had after going to a tropical island. Then in season three, Diane visits Seattle to produce a play, but confesses to Frasier she needs help because her life is a mess. Later in the series, she appears in a dream sequence in which Frasier's ex-wives, ex-girlfriends and late mother all confront him regarding his romantic failings. Diane is mentioned throughout the series by Frasier and his family as both one of his most important relationships, as well as being the cause of a notable downturn in his life after she left him at the altar.

=== Woody Boyd ===
Woody Boyd (Woody Harrelson) appears in one episode in season six when he visits Frasier in Seattle. He and Frasier reminisce about their past days at Cheers, but the more time they spend together, the more they realize they have nothing in common but memories. Realizing that, they part as friends, agreeing to meet once every five or ten (Frasier emphasizes ten) years.

=== Cliff Clavin ===
Cliff Clavin (John Ratzenberger) was in a season nine episode called "Cheerful Goodbyes" where Frasier returns to Boston for a convention and unwittingly stumbles on Cliff's retirement party, with Frasier too diplomatic to admit he had not come for the party. In a farewell speech, Frasier inadvertently convinces Cliff to stay in Boston, to the outrage of Carla, who tries to kill him with a spear gun.

=== Norm Peterson ===
Norm Peterson (George Wendt) attends the retirement party of Cliff Clavin in "Cheerful Goodbyes". He meets up with Frasier at the party, and gets along famously with Martin as a fellow beer drinker. Frasier telephones Norm in the episode "Three Dates and a Break Up".

=== Carla Tortelli ===
Carla Tortelli (Rhea Perlman) was a waitress at Cheers. She appears in "Cheerful Goodbyes" at Cliff Clavin's retirement party, ecstatic that Cliff is finally leaving Boston. She flies into a psychotic rage when Cliff announces he has decided to stay, thanks in part to Frasier. She is ready to attack Cliff with one of his gifts, a spear gun, but security drags her out.

=== Barflies ===
Many of the recurring barfly characters seen on Cheers also appeared in "Cheerful Goodbyes", including Paul Krapence (played by Paul Willson), Cliff's rival Walt Twitchell (played by Raye Birk), and Phil (played by Philip Perlman).

== Other characters ==
=== Bebe Glazer ===
Bebe Glazer (Harriet Sansom Harris) is Frasier's agent over the course of most of the series, described by Niles as "Lady Macbeth without the sincerity" and said to have "morals that would raise eyebrows in the court of Caligula". An intensely manipulative and seductive woman, with no apparent morals whatsoever outside of getting the best deal for herself and her clients, she is often compared to the Princess of Darkness by most of the characters, Niles in particular, who comments "She's the devil, Frasier. Run fast, run far!"

The two first meet in the season 1 episode "Selling Out", in which Bebe – who introduces herself as Bulldog's agent – hears Frasier endorse a Chinese restaurant on the air and harangues him into letting her line up other such deals for him, intimating that her own experience of meeting her daughter's college fees at Stanford will stand Frasier in good stead when he sends Freddy to Harvard. He comes to rely on her in order to get the best deal he can out of his employers, whilst simultaneously frequently being horrified by her extremely flexible and questionable ethics. She harbors a deep desire to be in the limelight herself, a dream briefly realized when she and Frasier co-host a morning television show for a week in "Morning Becomes Entertainment". In the final episode, she is revealed to have a son, whose apparent age (around 40) is used to imply the talent of Bebe's cosmetic surgeon. In "Agents In America Part III", Bulldog describes Bebe as his agent, though it's likely this changed later in the series by the time he lost his job at KACL. She once seduced and attempted to marry an octogenarian multimillionaire in the hopes of inheriting his fortune upon his death, for which Frasier had to help her quit smoking over the course of a single weekend, at great stress to herself and the entire Crane family. However, during the wedding he died (with Bebe attempting to go through with the ceremony until being discovered), whereupon she took up smoking again. She is also revealed, like Frasier, to have been an old friend of Dr. Phil, who frequently ended up owing her money as a result of their poker games.

Bebe reappears in the revival show, now accompanied by her daughter Phoebe (Rachel Bloom), whom Frasier thinks might be his daughter as she was born just some time after Frasier and Bebe had slept together and they share common interests. It is then revealed that Bebe again has an ulterior motive - she is trying to get Frasier to revive his TV talk show.

=== Donny Douglas ===
Donald Ronald "Donny" Douglas (Saul Rubinek) is Niles' divorce lawyer and, for a period, Daphne's boyfriend and fiancé. Despite Niles's intense crush on Daphne, it is he who first introduces the two; they meet during Niles' divorce proceedings, while Donny, who is representing Niles against Maris, is helping Frasier to prepare his upcoming testimony. Although a highly successful lawyer, Donny is exceedingly boorish and brash (his antics include arriving for a meeting with Frasier and Niles in a tracksuit after a jog, and changing into his suit in front of them), and are anathema to Frasier's and Niles' refinement; his degree from the University of Las Vegas leads Yale/Cambridge-educated Niles to comment that there could have been "no problem finding tassels for those mortarboards", and although Harvard/Oxford-educated Frasier tells him to "stop being such a snob", his opinions are evidently similar. Their opinion of Donny changes when he cows a supposedly tough lawyer over the phone, greatly reducing the time Niles must wait for his day in court. Donny wins a favorable divorce settlement for Niles through his discovery that Maris' family fortune was based on urinal cakes; Niles' joy is immediately cut short when Donny starts dating Daphne.

Ultimately, Daphne leaves Donny at the altar in favor of Niles. Embittered, Donny sues both her and Frasier (who was responsible for Daphne and Niles getting together) but eventually drops the lawsuit. Daphne later encounters Donny in the final minutes before his courtroom wedding to his new fiancée. In the tenth-season premiere, "The Ring Cycle," he reappears with yet a different fiancée, a woman named Bridgett, at Daphne's courtroom wedding with Niles. Donny thanks Daphne, stating that she played a major role in his eventual happiness, as if she had not left him at the altar, he would not have met his ex-wife, who introduced him to his new bride-to-be. Donny then comments that he hopes Niles and Daphne will attend their wedding, to which Daphne, absentmindedly being polite, states the same thing, only for Donny to graciously accept her invitation. While it appears that he no longer harbors any resentment towards the couple, when Daphne states that she cannot marry Niles (as, unbeknownst to Donny, Bridgett, Frasier, Martin, and Gertrude, they eloped to Reno, Nevada a week before, and were about to be married for a third time, in order to appease Gertrude, who had missed their second wedding, which occurred in order to please Frasier and Martin), Donny is vindictive towards him, declaring "YES! I KNEW IT! Now you know what it's like to have the love of your life dump you at the altar! And good luck trying to find somebody as good, because she just ain't out there!" This shocks and insults Bridgett, who leaves, causing a distressed Donny to chase after her.

=== Jerome Belasco ===
Jerome Belasco (Harris Yulin) is an implied crime boss, whom Niles and Frasier approach to seek his help in getting one of Maris' parking tickets overturned—an action which soon comes back to haunt Frasier, as he must then convince Belasco's fiancée not to pursue a career after their wedding. After Frasier fails to do so, a despondent Belasco explains to him and Niles that he had originally been supportive of his fiancée's career ambitions but found that she was extremely unemployable. To remedy this situation, Niles is forced to hire her as his receptionist. He was portrayed by Harris Yulin, who was nominated for an Emmy for his portrayal of Jerome.

=== Kirby Gardner ===
Kirby (Brian Klugman) is the teenage son of Lana and Bob Gardner, and sometime employee of KACL. He is briefly tutored by Frasier, with whom he develops a father-son relationship in the later portion of his appearances. When Frasier endures a brutal interview with teen radio journalists where they exploit him, Kirby comes to Frasier's aid by supplying him with embarrassing information about the journalists. He also does odd jobs for Niles. Kirby's wild hairstyle has been compared to Sideshow Bob's. Kirby is smitten with Roz Doyle, leading Frasier to manipulate Roz into escorting Kirby to the latter's high school prom as an incentive for Kirby to study and achieve good grades.

=== Bob Gardner ===
Bob Gardner (Brian Kerwin) is the husband of Lana Gardner and father of Kirby. Having previously abandoned his wife for another woman, he later had second thoughts and debated whether to return to her—coincidentally, at an airport he met up with Frasier, who was considering whether or not to pursue Lana romantically at the time, and after a brief conversation decided to remain with his wife. Frasier, who had also left the conversation with the intent to pursue Lana, decided as a consequence to withdraw and advised Lana to at least attempt to restore her marriage.

=== Lana Gardner ===
Lana Gardner, née Lynley (Jean Smart) is an old high school classmate of Frasier's, on whom both Frasier and Niles had crushes during high school. Frasier and Lana meet again as adults, and have a brief romantic relationship while Lana is estranged from her husband, Bob Gardner. Frasier calls this off owing to Lana's immensely aggressive personality. They later become friends. Lana is the mother of Kirby, and has at least one other child. In Jean Smart's first appearance as this character, she was known as Lorna Lynley—the character's name was later changed to Lana to avoid referring to a real person by that name.

=== Derek Mann ===
Derek Mann (voiced by Joe Mantegna) is a newspaper columnist who is one of Frasier's biggest critics. His columns often debase Frasier's program and often twists the doctor's innocent advice to make Frasier look bad in the eyes of the public. He once challenged Frasier to a fistfight after the doctor publicly ridiculed him on his radio show.

=== Cam Winston ===
Cam Winston (Brian Stokes Mitchell) is the deep-voiced tenant of the apartment above Frasier's and is Frasier's rival. The two frequently clash and compete over parking spaces, apartment board placement, and balcony rights. For all their rivalry, the two have near-identical tastes, mannerisms, and personalities, which prompt competitiveness between them. The two have a history of trumping each other tit-for-tat via the apartment board: while Frasier persuades the board to ban Cam from parking his Humvee in the provided garage, Cam, in passive protest, hangs an enormous American flag over Frasier's balcony, covering Frasier's view; as well as the obvious inconvenience, this incident also damages Frasier's standing with the board, as when he protests about the flag, Cam twists matters to make Frasier seem unpatriotic. When their parents feign a dating relationship to have the two come to a truce, Cam and Frasier finally end their feud and compromise with each other to please their parents. Martin and Cam's mother do eventually enjoy a short-lived relationship. Cam is exploited in the 10th-season episode, Door Jam, when Frasier finds an exclusive luxury spa invitation addressed to Cam in his own mail box thanks to their mail box exchange as a condition of their truce. Intrigued, Frasier and Niles go to the spa, but find that they are not on the "list", prompting Niles to impersonate Cam's vocal characteristics in the charade, to get access into the spa.

The last mention of Cam Winston is in the 11th-season episode, "Crock Tales": Frasier, Niles, Daphne, and Roz are locked out of Frasier's apartment on the balcony and yell for Cam's help after they are unable to gain the attention of Martin, who's inside with headphones on.

=== Duke ===
Duke (John LaMotta) is Martin's close friend. He briefly appears in the second-season episode "Dukes, We Hardly Knew Ye" when Martin takes Frasier and Niles to Duke's bar called "Duke's", which is demolished later in the episode. He also appears as one of Martin's poker buddies in the fifth-season episode "Where Every Bloke Knows Your Name". Sometime near the beginning of the eighth season, Duke moves to Florida. Duke is frequently referenced on the show, and Martin is sometimes shown speaking to him on the phone or returning from visiting with him. Duke is divorced and has a son, as well as a daughter named Marie (played by Teri Hatcher) who briefly dates Frasier in the sixth-season episode "First, Do No Harm".

=== James ===
James (James Oliver) is a barista and waiter at Cafe Nervosa. He appeared in thirteen episodes over the course of the series, and often interacted with the main characters in the cafe. His first appearance was in 2001, and his last was in 2003. Somewhat indifferent or emotionless, he is described by Frasier as 'unflappable'. In the episode "Deathtrap", he pitches in an idea to Roz about how to make Alice's new pet hamster be quiet; suggesting "moving the cage to another room".

=== Waitress ===
Luck Hari played a never-named waitress at Cafe Nervosa during seasons 1 through 4. She appeared in eleven episodes, perhaps most memorably in "My Coffee With Niles", where she appeared in the episode's final reflective moment with Frasier.

== Characters introduced in Frasier (2023) ==
=== Alan Cornwall ===
Played by Nicholas Lyndhurst; Frasier's friend from college who is now a professor of psychology at Harvard University. He has a sarcastic sense of humor and loves to remind Olivia that he has tenure and she can't fire him.

=== Eve ===
Jess Salgueiro plays Freddy's roommate. She is a waitress at Mahoney's, an aspiring actress and a single mother. Her infant son, John, is also the son of her deceased boyfriend, one of Freddy's fellow firefighters who died in the line of duty.

=== Olivia Finch ===
Toks Olagundoye plays the head of the Harvard University psychology department. She is eager to exploit Frasier's fame as a celebrity psychologist to draw donors to the department and is somewhat frustrated that she can't fire Alan due to his tenure.

== Dr. Frasier Crane Show callers ==
Voices for callers who phone in to the Dr. Frasier Crane Show were provided, in many cases, by famous actors and other personalities. Very often, they would literally call in to the studio to record their parts, without having to appear in person.

Since these voices were added in post-production, callers' lines were spoken during live studio filming by crewpersons or other actors—including, very often, Arleen Sorkin, the wife of executive producer Christopher Lloyd. Sorkin appeared in a live cameo during the series finale, "Goodnight, Seattle".

Some performers would later appear on the show as unrelated characters. For instance, Linda Hamilton played the final caller during the pilot episode, "The Good Son", and later appeared in the season four finale.

There were only three performers to make a call into the show and appear later in the episode. Lilith Sternin, Frasier's ex-wife, in the episode "The Show Where Lilith Comes Back" when she calls in to make a criticism of his advice to a previous caller. He then makes plans to meet her after Roz, knowing all about Frasier's tumultuous relationship with his ex, suggests taking her out for dinner live on air so that he has no choice but to accept. The second was Renée Lippin, who played Kari in the episode "Someone to Watch Over Me". Kari is Frasier's stalker who calls into the show and is seen at the SeaBea awards. Woody Boyd, the bartender at Cheers, calls in to the show because he is stuck driving in circles at the airport. He and Frasier reminisce on their Cheers days later in the show.

Occasionally, the problem mentioned by a caller served as the main plot for the show, such as Gretchen (Glenne Headly), who worried that her husband was having an affair with a woman whom Frasier suspected of being Niles's wife, Maris. In a similar episode "A Word to the Wiseguy", Frasier receives a call from Brandy, the girlfriend of a shady businessman, saying she wants to leave him after Frasier promised he would counsel the woman into marrying her boyfriend.

Very often, the caller's problem is a deliberate joke on that actor's real-life. For instance, Cindy Crawford, a model and spokeswoman for a make-up company, played a manicurist.

Caller name	Season and Episode	Portrayed by	Call Information	Notes
Russell	1.01	Griffin Dunne	the first caller featured in the pilot episode, who feels his life is going nowhere	Dunne later appeared in the series as Bob, a wheelchair-using photographer interested in becoming Frasier's friend. Also, his father Dominick Dunne calls during the episode "Miracle on Third or Fourth Street".
Claire	1.01	Linda Hamilton	broken-hearted about the loss of her boyfriend	Played Sarah Connor in the Terminator films, her character experiences a break-up which she cannot get over emotionally in her call. She later appeared in season 4 episode "Odd Man Out" as a cello player who left messages on Frasier's machine by accident.
Leonard	1.02	Christopher Reeve	an extreme agoraphobe with a terror of wide, open spaces	Reeve portrayed Superman in a series of films.
Pam	1.03	Patti LuPone	calls in asking how to deal with her in-laws who drop by unannounced	Later appeared as Aunt Zora in the season 5 episode "Beware of Greeks".
Lorraine	1.04	Judith Ivey	calls in but keeps getting interrupted with other calls on her line	
Derek Mann	1.04	Joe Mantegna	A newspaper critic. After being attacked by Frasier on his radio show, he calls in to berate him and to arrange a fist fight	Like Grammer, Mantegna plays one of The Simpsons most recognizable guest characters, Springfield mob boss Fat Tony
Doug	1.05	Jeff Daniels	is getting fed up with his layabout mother	Daniels appeared in the 90's films Dumb and Dumber and Speed
Gary	1.06	Robert Klein	his wife wants to go to Italy but he thinks the money should be spent on a sump pump	
Hank	1.07	Eddie Van Halen	unsure if he is on the show due to broadcast delay feedback issues	Eddie Van Halen is a rock guitarist that leverages electronic effects to complement musicianship
Marco	1.07	Bruno Kirby	complains about his girlfriend pressing him for a commitment, saying he wants to keep his options open "in case somebody better comes along"	Kirby played in comedy films such as Good Morning, Vietnam, When Harry Met Sally..., and City Slickers.
Danielle	1.08	JoBeth Williams	is having a problem with her monsieur	Williams later appeared as Madeline Marshall in "Adventures and Paradise" Parts 1 and 2. As Madeline, she uses her own voice, but as Danielle, she affects a French accent.
Roger	1.09	Carl Reiner	arguing with his wife about what to name his brand-new cabin cruiser; Frasier responds that he could not locate his interest in Roger's problem with the aid of an electron microscope	Carl Reiner directed the comedy films Oh, God! and Summer School Also, his son Rob Reiner calls during season 5.
Don	1.10	Jay Leno	complains about his inability to lose weight, when another voice cuts in and reveals that he is at a drive-through window	Actually known for having hundreds of cars and is often seen cruising in them
Barry	1.12	Ben Stiller	calls in on Christmas Day and cannot stop crying	
Don	1.12	Eric Stoltz	calls in to share a feeling which put him in the spirit of Christmas	
Tom	1.12	Mel Brooks	a man traumatized as a child when his parents' Christmas present, a puppy, "wouldn't wake up"	
Jeff	1.12	Dominick Dunne	says he always relieves his Christmas depression watching The Sound of Music (at a time when Frasier has had to give up a visit with his son, Frederick, so he can take a theater tour of Salzburg).	Son Griffin Dunne was the very first caller.
Gladys	1.12	Rosemary Clooney	has fallen so many times in the shower that they cannot fit any more pins in her hip	
Al	1.13	Henry Mancini	a man who cannot stand the sound of his own voice	Shortly thereafter, Frasier plays Mancini's "Moon River"
Ethan	1.13	Elijah Wood	gets beat up at school for being too smart and non-athletic, and proceeds to complain about Frasier's condescending advice.	Because he was constantly appearing in films as a child, Wood was home-schooled until he enrolled in university
Marianne	1.13	Piper Laurie	had a fight with her grown-up daughter when she insisted that her daughter's boyfriend spend the night in a separate bedroom	Laurie later appeared in the episode "Dr. Nora". Also played the religious fanatic mother of the title character in the film Carrie.
Hank	1.16	Timothy Leary	complains about an overeating disorder	
Dr. Helmut Bruga	1.19	Malcolm McDowell	appears on Frasier's show to discuss his book as well as hit on Roz	
Rachel	1.20	Reba McEntire	married to a widower who insists on keeping his late wife's ashes on a shelf in their bedroom	McEntire later starred in her own sitcom, Reba, as a divorced mother who cannot get her ex and his new wife to stay away from her.
Laura	1.22	Christine Lahti	calls in to tell Frasier and Niles about her sisters and how she lost her hair	
Janice	1.23	Patricia Hearst	has a problem breaking through a barrier with her in-laws, Frasier (who's high) then dismisses this problem as "boring"	
Robert	1.23	Tommy Hilfiger	calls in, but Frasier (who's high) disconnects him as they have already had a Robert on the show today	
Howard	1.23	Steve Lawrence	Niles (filling in for Frasier) is counseling Howard and his wife over the radio simultaneously	Lawrence's singing partner and real-life wife also plays his 'radio' wife
Louis	1.23	Garry Trudeau	calls in to Frasier's show while Gil Chesterton is filling in for a sick Frasier to say he has forgotten his anniversary, and Gil arranges a private table at a five-star restaurant.	
Lois	1.23	Eydie Gormé	Niles (filling in for Frasier) is counseling Lois and her husband over the radio simultaneously	Eydie's singing partner and real-life husband also plays her 'radio' husband
Blake	1.23	Steve Young	crashes his car after Frasier, not realizing he was on a car phone, tells him to close his eyes and imagine he is on a tropical island	
Marjorie	1.23	Mary Tyler Moore	thinks her boss does not respect her and lacks courage to approach him	describes relationship between character Mary Richards (Mary Tyler Moore) and boss Lou Grant character on The Mary Tyler Moore Show
Steven	2.01	James Spader	has doubts about his wife's decision to have their newborn baby share their bedroom.	
Rita	2.02	Lily Tomlin	an overworked housewife with four children who's about to crack under the strain; Frasier, who's just been laden with a litter of puppies, suggests that she consider getting one.	
Maggie	2.04	Amy Madigan	is unsure what to do with her clingy boyfriend	Husband Ed Harris calls during season 3
Edna	2.06	Alfre Woodard	gets depressed about living in rain-washed Seattle.	
Connie	2.06	Sandra Dee	angrily berates Frasier for claiming Seattle is depressing	
Holden Thorpe	2.07	Sydney Pollack	an obnoxious right-wing Congressional candidate who insults Frasier over the air, driving Frasier to film an endorsement for Thorpe's opponent	Directed films such as The Way We Were, Tootsie and The Firm
Chester	2.08	Art Garfunkel	a laconic man whose wife is criticizing him for his lack of ambition or drive	
Vic	2.09	Kevin Bacon	has trouble meeting women.	In real life, Bacon has played a teen heartthrob in Footloose and a bachelor astronaut in Apollo 13.
Linda	2.10	Betty Comden	calls in asking for directions to an antique store	Comden was one-half of the musical-comedy duo Comden and Green
Walter	2.10	Adolph Green	proclaims that he is not lost after his wife calls into the show asking for directions	Green was one-half of the musical-comedy duo Comden and Green
Elliott	2.11	Macaulay Culkin	plays an adolescent who calls in to the show saying the problem is that he is a salesman with a young voice, causing Frasier to apologize, and Culkin replies, "Ha Gotcha Dr. Doofus".	brother Kieran calls in season 4
Francesca	2.12	Rosie Perez	suffers a fear of abandonment – Frasier is cut off from her when his incompetent producer hits the wrong button	Perez later appeared during the Season Eleven episode, "Crock Tales". She was also the actress originally pitched by the show's creators for the role of Martin Crane's caretaker, the role ultimately given to Jane Leeves.
Marie	2.12	Carly Simon	wants to ask out a forty-year-old man who's never been married	
Marjorie	2.13	Mary Steenburgen	an acrophobe who calls in to say that she has almost conquered her fears	In real life, Steenburgen is married to actor Ted Danson, who appears as his Cheers character, Sam Malone, later in the series. Also, her first husband, Malcolm McDowell, calls during season 1.
Sid	2.18	Gary Sinise	is incapable of talking on the phone with strangers unless he writes out everything he wants to say in advance	
Madman Martinez	2.19	John Lithgow	pretends to be depressed, as a means of plugging his car dealership	Prolific actor Lithgow has played several insane characters, such as in the films Blowout and Cliffhanger, and as an alien on the NBC sitcom 3rd Rock from the Sun.
Gretchen	2.21	Glenne Headly	an Austrian woman who suspects that her husband, a fencing instructor, is having an affair with his student (whom Frasier suspects is Maris)	
Caroline	2.24	Shelley Duvall	feels like she is not making any progress with her therapist (who, unbeknownst to Frasier, turns out to be Niles)	
Mark	3.01	Matthew Broderick	a clerk in an all-night convenience store whose "camera self" is doing things Mark does not approve of	Played a man stalked by a psychopathic technician in the 1996 film The Cable Guy.
Phyllis	3.01	Carrie Fisher	has incurable insomnia	Famous for her role as Princess Leia
Keith	3.01	Tom Hulce	disagrees with the last two callers and says that his job is very important before leaving to go powder jelly donuts	
Nancy	3.01	Teri Garr	calls in proclaiming she is naked and that she would prefer to be the spanker	appeared in a series of ads for lady's underwear in the 1980s
Jill	3.02	Blair Brown	has a recurring dream that Frasier finds fascinating	
Eileen	3.03	Mary Elizabeth Mastrantonio	fantasizes about Frasier when she is having sex with her husband	
Rob	3.04	Ed Harris	calls in to Bulldog's show to congratulate him on "getting" Frasier with pranks	Looks remarkably like Dan Butler, who plays Bulldog. Both actors also played NASA flight director Gene Kranz, (Harris in Apollo 13 and Butler in the mini series From the Earth to the Moon). Also, Harris's wife Amy Madigan calls during season 2
Jack	3.04	Billy Crystal	on Bulldog's show talking about sport and congratulate him on "getting" Frasier with pranks	
Marilyn	3.05	Brooke Adams	homesick for her little hometown in Wisconsin	
June	3.06	Laura Dern	her husband gets mad at her for eavesdropping on other diners in restaurants	
Polly	3.07	Cyd Charisse	says she is "lacking a certain spice", not knowing Frasier is filling in for "The Happy Chef"	
Vinnie	3.08	Paul Mazursky	a womanizer who calls in trying to locate a pinky ring he left in his latest conquest's house	
Bob	3.09	Ray Liotta	calls from the airport during Christmas, unsure whether he wants to fly home, or hop on an open flight to Hawaii, after Frasier counsels him, Bob says he has reached a decision, to which Frasier replies darkly "Mele Kalikimaka, Bob"	
Gerard	3.11	Armistead Maupin	"Called in for a different reason" when Frasier talked about the apprehension of meeting new friends, Gerard was inspired and offered to comb Frasier's hair.	
Marlene	3.13	Jodie Foster	an over-worked housewife who announced that, if her husband and she did not find a time to themselves to have sex, she would go to a department store and pick up a stranger	played a teenage prostitute in the film Taxi Driver.
Brandy	3.15	Faith Prince	after being told to do so by her boyfriend Jerome, she calls in to ask Frasier if she should marry him. This is pay back for Jerome helping with Maris' ticket problem and part of his plan to get Brandy to marry him	
Steve	3.15	Randy Travis	trying to lose weight	
Lydia	3.17	Joan Allen	being tormented by obscene phone calls.	Frasier enters the booth as Roz hurriedly moves away to let Frasier sit down, he is late because somebody took his parking space, and on top of it all, just after Lydia has finished stating her problem, Frasier starts breathing heavily into the mic.
Brenda	3.17	Katarina Witt	starts to tell Frasier about a dispute with her sister, but puts Frasier on hold to answer her other line.	
Mitch	3.17	Jerry Orbach	takes revenge on an offending neighbor by smashing the man's offending leaf blower against a tree	At the time, was playing a NYPD detective on NBC's Law & Order.
Chris	3.17	Billy Barty	takes revenge on a neighbor by shoving a pound of rotten shrimp into the man's air conditioner.	
Chuck	3.17	Eric Idle	takes revenge on an enemy by sending him 100 scorpions in a FedEx parcel	Monty Python star.
Rochelle	3.17	Jane Pauley	takes revenge on her neighbor for failing to curb her dogs, by setting the woman's lawn on fire	
Beth	3.19	Debbi Fields	is pretty sure her husband is having an affair. Frasier suspects that Roz is talking to his callers after he hangs up with them. Frasier catches Roz in the act of giving Beth advice. She assures him that it is the first and last time. After Frasier leaves, Roz then takes a call from Bill.	
Tom	3.22	David Duchovny	has sex with his girlfriend of six years every morning, every night, and three times a day on weekends, but is not sure they really have anything else in common	Duchovny's The X-Files co-star Gillian Anderson calls during season 6.
Angela	3.24	Sherry Lansing	calls in about a problem relating to her dead husband	At the time, Lansing was CEO of Paramount Studios, which produced Frasier.
Jerry	4.02	Marv Albert	calls in to Bob "Bulldog" Briscoe's Gonzo Sports Show with a question.	Albert is a professional sportscaster.
Jake	4.02	Bob Costas	calls into Bulldog's show with a sports question	Costas is a professional sportscaster.
Mike	4.02	Julius Erving	calls into Bulldog's show for his take on the Yankees this season	Erving was a former professional basketball player
Jimmy	4.03	Kieran Culkin	calls in claiming his parents are stupid and asks how long it'll last	Plays a character with similar Problems in "Igby Goes Down"; brother Macaulay calls in season 2
Rudy	4.03	Christopher Durang	on air telling the plot of a sad movie while crying	Durang later appeared in the season-six episode "The Seal Who Came to Dinner"
Linda	4.05	Wendy Wasserstein	While Niles is sitting in for Frasier Linda calls in to have Niles talk with her cat to get it to eat.	
Greg	4.08	John Cusack	a first-year graduate student in psychology who has misdiagnosed himself with every disorder he is studying	
Alice	4.12	Patty Duke	calls in after thinking about sad things, to which Frasier tells her a story about Eddie	
Chet	4.15	Eric Roberts	a once-timid man who takes Frasier's advice about assertiveness too far and becomes an overbearing jerk	
Doug	4.19	David Benoit	explaining his unemployment situation	Before getting steady gigs or record deals, musicians are considered stereotypically chronically unemployed.
Dorothy	5.03	Cindy Crawford	Roz's manicurist, whom Roz accidentally puts through to the show	Crawford later became a spokeswoman for Revlon cosmetics
Roger	5.13	John Waters	a transsexual who is thinking of changing careers as he is feeling trapped. Roz forces him make the problem more interesting in order to get through by classifying "trapped" as a woman trapped inside of a man's body. He is also thinking of running for political office	Waters is a member of the LGBTQ community
Bill	5.13	Rob Reiner	was a bed-wetter as a child and thinks the problem is coming back. Roz forces him to make the problem more interesting in order to get through asking him if he has wet the bed with anyone else in it (stripper, hooker, best friend's wife); he decides to pick the third option	Father Carl Reiner called in Season 1.
Mary	5.13	Bess Myerson	is indecisive.	Was the first Jewish Miss America
Betsy	5.15	Halle Berry	her husband wants to take her on an anniversary cruise, but she has recurring nightmares about being shipwrecked	
Marie	5.17	Jill Clayburgh	has a hard time getting out of bed every morning, and that she feels irritable when she does	
Patrick	5.24	John McEnroe	he thinks his wife is having an affair	
Ralph	6.11	William H. Macy	calls after Frasier has helped him change a tire, to complain about damage done to his car	Macy co-starred with Kelsey Grammer in Down Periscope and is also married to Felicity Huffman, who had a recurring role on the show as Julia Wilcox, a brief love interest and colleague to Frasier.
Stephen	6.11	Ron Howard	believes a mysterious voice from his radio is telling him what to do	Directed the classic films Splash, Apollo 13, and A Beautiful Mind.
Sophie	6.12	Marlo Thomas	arguing with her husband, Larry, about wanting to invite some of her girlfriends to his Super Bowl party	Larry is voiced by Thomas's real-life husband, Phil Donahue.
Larry	6.12	Phil Donahue	gets pulled onto the show after an argument with his wife, Sophie, about inviting some of her friends to his Super Bowl party	Sophie is voiced by Marlo Thomas, Donahue's real-life wife.
Audrey	6.13	Beverly D'Angelo	Seems to be discussing a serious relationship problem with her sister when Frasier states in a fed-up tone that she should just "fix the dress" that was accidentally ripped.	
Jenny	6.20	Gillian Anderson	worried about whether her boyfriend is afraid of commitment.	Anderson's The X-Files co-star David Duchovny calls during season 3.
Jill	6.20	Pia Zadora	her husband is gay, but Dr. Nora refuses to accept this as a reason for a divorce, telling her to "Make it work!"	
Tom	6.20	Yo-Yo Ma	calls in to Dr. Nora's show asking how he can deal with an annoying co-worker	
Denise	6.20	Bonnie Raitt	has a poisonous relationship with her overbearing mother	Raitt is a Blues legend.
Gabe	7.16	Isaac Mizrahi	has an addiction to shopping	Mizrahi is a fashion designer
Maria	7.16	Gloria Estefan	her husband has been having affairs since they were newlyweds and wants to know how to change him	
Brian	8.08	Stephen King	Frasier tries to squeeze Brian in before the news, but he does not want that and says that he would rather wait	
Tom	8.08	Wolfgang Puck	Frasier tries to squeeze Tom in before the news, but he also prefers to wait	Later appears in season 9 episode "The Proposal" as himself
Andy	8.09	Neil Simon	unsure if he is on	
Cleo	8.10	Melissa Etheridge	unable to choose among her three gorgeous boyfriends	In real life, Melissa is married to another woman.
Rachel	8.13	Bernadette Peters	(while Frasier is listening to The Best of Crane in his car) calls in to thank Frasier for a book recommendation and to try score a date with him	
Fred	8.16	Hal Prince	has a fear of intimacy	
Tom	9.04	Anthony Edwards	calls from his wedding to say he is having second thoughts	
Estelle	9.08	Jennifer Jason Leigh	calls in with a question for Bill Gates about multi-lingual user interface add-ons	
Warren	9.08	Bobby Short	calls in with a question for Bill Gates asking if he needs to make a boot disk when installing XP as an upgrade	
Phyllis	9.08	Allison Janney	calls in with a description of her missing cat	Appears in the episode "Three Blind Dates".
Joe	9.08	Larry Gelbart	calls in explaining how he understands how Frasier feels losing his tape as he lost a gold cuff link a few years ago and that if anyone finds it, he would love to have it back	
Garth	9.10	Pat Boone	calls in while Frasier and Kenny are arguing over the show's advertising budget after Dr. Zach's more sexually oriented show begins dominating the ratings. When Garth mentions he is part of a couple with problems, Kenny and Frasier get their hopes up for a juicy call, only to find out Garth has budget problems	Boone owned the Oakland Oaks, an ABA team with severe financial problems
Janet	9.10	Cherry Jones	complains about her boring sex life with her husband	
Terrence	9.11	Andy García	is sick of being single	
Mike	9.14	Freddie Prinze, Jr.	calls in while Frasier is a guest speaker on the program Teen Scene	
Lillian	9.18	Naomi Judd	has perfectionist tendencies	
Jeremy	9.21	Rufus Wainwright	teenager who has (unknown) problems	
Carl	9.22	Keith Carradine	after hearing Roz's heartbreak on air, he calls in believing that he is going to be dumped and is unsure what to do about it	
Unnamed Caller	9.22	Olympia Dukakis	called to berate Frasier over the phone, but changes her mind when she hears Roz unload her heartbreak over the air	
Unnamed Caller	9.22	Scott Hamilton	tells Frasier to go back to Seattle	
Unnamed Caller	9.22	Daryl Hannah	calls in to let Sully fans know they're boycotting KQZY	
Jerry	10.02	Billy Bean	wants to know what's going on with Dr. Crane (who's late) after Roz let it slip that they slept together	
Mark	10.02	Charles Busch	things are uncomfortable at work after he slept with his boss	
Sheila	10.02	Leelee Sobieski	originally wanted to ask something else, but questions Roz about this 'person she slept with' because it sounded like she still worked for him	
Stu	10.04	Bradley Whitford	his girlfriend wants him to move in	
Grant	10.09	John Turturro	calls in because his grandmother died two weeks ago and he never told her how much she meant to him	
Mindy	10.17	Laura Linney	calls in about her mother from work, causing her to pretend she is dealing with customers because of her boss	Later played Charlotte in the final season
Ernie	10.23	Bill Paxton	calls in because he is angry at his dog	
Kevin	11.03	Benjamin Bratt	Frasier claims that he is not honest, who then turns it back around by saying that Frasier also is not honest after he was seen entering a gay bar	
Celeste's Mother	11.12	Estelle Parsons	picks up the phone saying they're all on the radio	Parsons appeared later as Opal in the episode "Coots and Ladders"
Britney	11.12	Hilary Duff	announces she is running away from home after the rest of her family have carried their latest argument onto the air	
Morrie	11.12	Stanley Tucci	a man whose wife suspects him of cheating on her, to the point where he has locked himself in his bathroom to make the call.	
Celeste	11.12	Penny Marshall	Morrie's wife, who picks up the phone, sure he is on the phone with his mistress	Marshall directed the classic films Big, Awakenings, and A League of Their Own.
Babette	11.17	Helen Mirren	a kleptomaniac	Mirren was the last guest caller of the series.
Jennifer	(2023) 02.08	Carol Burnett	Jennifer wants to start a family, but her boyfriend does not.	
