= Goodnight, Seattle =

- Frasier episodes
- Frasier does his final broadcast
- Episode nos.: Season 11; Episodes 23 & 24
- Directed by: David Lee
- Written by: Christopher Lloyd; Joe Keenan
- Original air date: May 13, 2004

Guest appearances
- Wendie Malick as Ronee (special guest star); Harriet Sansom Harris as Bebe Glazer (special guest star); Anthony LaPaglia as Simon Moon (special guest star); Robbie Coltrane as Michael Moon (special guest star); Richard E. Grant as Stephen Moon (special guest star); Jennifer Beals as Dr. Anne Ranberg (special guest star); Laura Linney as Charlotte (special appearance); Edward Hibbert as Gil Chesterton; Patrick Kerr as Noel Shempsky; Arleen Sorkin as Rachel; Ashley Thomas as Alice; Jason Biggs as Dr. Hauck; Tom McGowan as Kenny

Episode chronology
← Previous "Crock Tales"	Next → —

"Goodnight, Seattle" is the series finale of the American television sitcom Frasier. It is the 23rd and 24th episode of the eleventh season and the 263rd and the 264th episode overall. Written by Christopher Lloyd and Joe Keenan and directed by David Lee, the episode originally aired on NBC on May 13, 2004. The episode was viewed by 25.3 million people, ranking as the #1 show that week, and being the 11th-most-watched series finale and the 7th-most-watched from NBC. The episode had an overwhelmingly positive reception. In 2011, the finale was ranked #17 on the TV Guide Network special, TV's Most Unforgettable Finales.

== Plot ==
Frasier is on an airplane when he is surprised by the anxiety that the woman sitting next to him suffers during the flight. The woman introduces herself as Dr. Anne Ranberg, also a psychiatrist. After brief deliberation, Frasier decides to disclose what is on his mind, in hopes that it will help pass the time on the flight. The story is shown in flashback:

Frasier's girlfriend, Charlotte, is leaving for Chicago, leaving Frasier devoid of any current love life. When Frasier and Charlotte spontaneously sleep together, Frasier misses his regularly scheduled radio show. This results in station manager Kenny Daly filling in at the last minute and quickly starting to enjoy himself. Once Frasier arrives, he makes up an excuse that he was at the doctor. Frasier's agent, Bebe, arrives to tell him about a radio station in San Francisco that has offered him a better-paying job, but Frasier quickly declines, citing his comfort with his present situation at KACL.

In the meantime, Frasier's brother Niles and Niles' wife Daphne are anticipating the birth of their child, and three of Daphne's brothers, Simon, Stephen, and Michael, are in Seattle in anticipation of Daphne's childbirth. Frasier and Niles' father, Martin, is also set to be married to Ronee. A mishap occurs when they learn that Martin accidentally booked the wedding venue for May 15 (his dog Eddie's birthday) instead of July 15. Frasier and Niles agree to plan the wedding in eight days.

As the two are frantically putting the wedding together, both Frasier and Niles encounter numerous difficulties. Frasier has arranged for a ceremonial cannon-firing when Martin and Ronee are officially declared married. However, the person responsible for firing the cannon gets heat stroke and faints from standing out in the sun too long. Michael volunteers to do the job instead and is told the cue from Frasier. Frasier and Niles also have find a replacement for the flower girl, as Daphne's brothers have accidentally intoxicated her to calm her nerves. Roz allows her daughter Alice to do the job; but when repeating the same cue to Roz, Michael fires off the cannon, creating havoc. Niles drops one of the wedding rings and Daphne realizes Eddie has eaten it.

Daphne and Niles take Eddie to a local veterinarian. While they are at the vet's office, Daphne goes into labor. Frasier, Martin, and Ronee all hurry to the clinic, where Daphne has given birth to the couple's first son, David. Ronee suggests that she and Martin get married in the clinic, so Daphne and Niles do not miss out, and Frasier marries them.

Later, a mover arrives to Frasier's apartment to take away Martin's chair. He finds himself with the peace and quiet he has said throughout the series that he is desperate for. However, with Martin having moved out and Niles and Daphne busy with their new son, Frasier realizes that he is lonely. He decides to accept the job offer in San Francisco, which had been improved to include a weekly television spot. Bebe refers Frasier to a doctor for treatment to alleviate his crow's feet in anticipation. However, Frasier is unhappy with the work which leaves his eyes prone to watering.

Frasier invites his brother, father, Daphne, Ronee, and Roz, who has just been announced as the new station manager, to his apartment to announce his move to San Francisco. When they overhear a call from Frasier's doctor on the answering machine being "sorry about the results", and Frasier begins giving away some of his sentimental possessions, they fear Frasier is dying. Frasier surprises them with the news that he is in fact moving to San Francisco, where his new show will begin the following week. During the evening, Martin sits in the chair Frasier has placed in the spot of his old recliner. He realizes the chair is comfortable and that he would have been okay with the fashionable piece, much to Frasier's chagrin. Niles comments that he was worried he would have nothing in common with his new son, and Martin commiserates and imparts the wisdom that, "it all works out".

Later, during the celebration, Frasier reveals his reasoning for taking the job, citing how Daphne and Niles, Martin and Ronee, and Roz have all started a new phase of their lives. Frasier now desires to do the same. Frasier then recites Alfred Lord Tennyson's poem "Ulysses". He reads the same poem at the end of his final show at KACL, where he thanks the staff and listeners for the past eleven years before closing with his signature words, "Goodnight, Seattle." Frasier finishes his story just as the plane lands, to reveal that Frasier is landing in Chicago, where Charlotte had moved, and not in San Francisco. He tells Anne that he knows he would always regret it if he did not take the chance, and asks her to wish him luck as the screen fades to black.
