= Roz Doyle =

Fictional character from the TV show Frasier

- Frasier / Frasier (2023) character
- Peri Gilpin as Roz Doyle
- First appearance: "The Good Son"
- Last appearance: "Father Christmas"
- Portrayed by: Peri Gilpin

In-universe information
- Gender: Female
- Occupation: Radio show producer Station manager
- Family: Joanna (mother); Denise (sister)
- Children: Alice May Doyle (born May 12, 1998)
- Relatives: Ned (uncle); Jen (cousin)

Rosalinda "Roz" Doyle (born May 5, 1963 or 1964) is a fictional character on the American television sitcom Frasier. Roz is the producer of Frasier Crane's Dr. Frasier Crane Show on KACL 780 AM.

The role initially went to Lisa Kudrow, but Kudrow was replaced by Peri Gilpin before filming began. The character is named as a tribute to a producer of the television series Wings (having the same creators as Frasier), who died from breast cancer in 1991. Gilpin reprised her role as Roz in the 2023 revival of Frasier. In May 2024, it was announced that Gilpin would be returning in a recurring role.

== Background ==
Roz is originally from Bloomer, Wisconsin. Her mother Joanna (Eva Marie Saint) was a longtime politician there and serves as Attorney General. She has a sister, Denise, whom she resents for her supposedly perfect life. Roz's parents are divorced. Her relationship with her father was good until he started dating a woman younger than she. She and Roz did not get along and he cut contact with Roz. Her maternal grandmother was an immigrant from Ireland. Frustrated with small-town Wisconsin, Roz moved to Seattle as an adult to pursue a career in radio and worked in the industry for about 10 years before joining Frasier.

== Relationships with other characters ==
Early in the series, Roz and Frasier have a strained relationship. As the show goes on, they become very close, often consoling each other through hard times, although the teasing, sardonic element continues.

Roz becomes fast friends with Frasier's father Martin. While Frasier and Niles are interested in high culture, Roz and Martin share a more down-to-earth view of life. In season 1, episode 18 ("And the Whimper Is...") Martin greets her by asking, "Hey, Roz, how's my girlfriend?" when she drops by his apartment, She is also seen at Martin's poker nights in season 5. The two of them often watch the antics of Frasier and Niles with at least some degree of glee when it inevitably backfires

Roz is also close to Martin's physical therapist Daphne Moon, as they are the only two women who are constant in the Crane men's lives. Daphne invites Roz to be a bridesmaid at her wedding to attorney Donny Douglas and later to be the maid of honor at her wedding to Niles; however, Daphne elopes with Niles in Reno, Nevada, and Roz is not present for their real wedding.

Roz has an antagonistic relationship with Frasier's brother Niles early in the series, but they become quite friendly as the series progresses. In season 11, episode 8 ("Murder Most Maris"), Roz defends Niles when he has a nervous breakdown.

== Character arc ==
Roz is portrayed as a professional woman with an active sex life, which is the subject of male jokes and snide remarks, especially from Frasier's brother Niles. Roz worries about her appearance as she ages, and is concerned that she will never fall in love and get married. She has a brief fling with a co-worker, Bob "Bulldog" Briscoe (much to her later chagrin).

Early in the fifth season, Roz discovers that she is pregnant with the child of a 20-year-old college student with whom she had a brief fling. By the end of the season, Roz gives birth to a girl, whom she names Alice.

Late in the ninth season, Roz finally manages to maintain a seemingly stable relationship with Roger, a city trash collector, but they break up when they see that their relationship chemistry is not right. Frasier consoles her, and this eventually leads them to sleep together. Roz subsequently flees home to Wisconsin, while Frasier chases after her in an attempt to remedy the situation. Frasier ends up posing as Roger, whom the Doyle family had been very excited to meet, although previously being a bit skeptical that Roger was not merely a falsehood constructed by Roz (due to Roz's romantic history). It is here that Roz and Frasier reconcile, and agree to remain friends.

In the show's final episode, Roz becomes station manager of KACL after the previous manager, Kenny Daly, decides to become a DJ again.

Gilpin reprised her role in the 2023 revival of Frasier. It is implied that she still lives in Seattle, but remained close to the Cranes, including Frasier in Chicago. She visits him in Boston to support him through his first Christmas after Martin's death.

Roz continues to appear in season 2 of the revival series, still working as the station manager, which is now struggling. Frasier briefly returns to Seattle when she's doing an anniversary piece for KACL, but with the overall decline in radio, she has considered quitting her job at KACL. As she also wants to spend more time with her daughter (who's now attending graduate school in Rhode Island), Frasier suggests that she leave Seattle and move to the East Coast.
