= Martin Crane =

American television show character

- Frasier character
- First appearance: "The Good Son" (episode 1.01)
- Last appearance: "Goodnight, Seattle (Part 2)" (episode 11.24)
- Portrayed by: John Mahoney

In-universe information
- Occupation: Served in the U.S. Army; Detective in the Seattle Police Department; (End of series, after coming out of retirement) security guard in an office building
- Family: Walt Crane (brother)
- Spouses: Hester Crane (m. 1952; died 1987); Ronee Lawrence (m. 2004)
- Children: Frasier Crane (son); Niles Crane (son)
- Relatives: Noah Crane (great-grandfather); Zora Crane (sister-in-law); Nikos Crane (nephew); Frederick Crane (grandson, via Frasier); David Crane (grandson, via Niles); Daphne Moon (daughter-in-law, via Niles); Unnamed granddaughter via Niles (mentioned in Rooms With a View)

Martin Crane (born c. May 1930s; (Note: In the 1994 episode ”My Coffee with Niles”, Crane's birth month is revealed as May. The year of birth is sometimes given as 1930s, 1931 or 1932) died 2023) is a fictional character from the American television show Frasier, and was played by John Mahoney. An army veteran and retired police detective, he is the father of Frasier and Niles Crane.

== Biography ==
Although Martin is first mentioned in an episode of the sitcom Cheers, his life history is mainly expanded on in Frasier. In an eighth season Cheers episode, Frasier claims that his father is dead and had been a research scientist. These comments are explained on Frasier as being the result of estrangement between Martin and Frasier at the time. (Mahoney also appeared in Cheers as a piano player and jingle writer.)

The son of a police officer, Martin was born in Seattle in 1932 and is a lifelong resident of the city. His great-grandparents were Noah Crane and a scullery maid from Russia. At the age of 19, Martin joined the U.S. Army, and saw combat in the Korean War. After returning home Martin joined the Seattle Police Department, and would remain in this capacity until being forced to retire due to being shot in the hip in 1991, at age 59. He served in various roles including as a patrol officer as well as a mounted patrol officer and eventually attained the position of Homicide Detective. He was also assigned to a vice detail for a year. He was married to Hester Rose Crane, a forensic psychiatrist whom he met in 1952 at a murder scene (it would later be revealed that Hester would commemorate their anniversary every year by making gingerbread men in the shape of the corpse). They remained married until her death in 1987, some six years before Martin moves in with Frasier.

Hester rejected his first marriage proposal, but the two married when she became pregnant with Frasier. The marriage was mostly a happy and loving one, but there were numerous issues; in particular, Hester had an affair with a family friend following a particularly difficult period in the marriage. Martin blamed himself for his wife's infidelity, which occurred about 30 years before the timeline of the show, and initially tells his sons that he had been the adulterer. The revelation brings Martin and Frasier closer together after Frasier confesses that his ex-wife Lilith also cheated on him.

Martin has a brother named Walt (who is married to a Greek woman named Zora), and one nephew, Walt and Zora's son Nikos. Martin and Walt are estranged, thanks to Zora's hostility toward Frasier's meddling in Nikos' life (encouraging him to follow his dream of becoming a professional juggler, rather than the more reputable profession his domineering mother wanted for him). They eventually reconcile, however. There is a discrepancy in the storyline, as Martin states in an earlier episode that he never had a brother.

In 1991, Martin was looking forward to retirement when he was shot by a man named David Hicks in the line of duty after interrupting a robbery attempt in a convenience store. Niles visited him, but the two had drifted apart. Although he hoped to return to work in a few weeks, the injury left a bullet in his left hip, forcing him to walk with a cane, held in his right hand, for the rest of his life, and to retire from the police force.

His injury inhibits him from living alone, and forces him to accept Frasier's invitation to live with him upon Frasier's return to Seattle. Martin soon grows close to his physical therapist, Daphne Moon, and steadily becomes closer to both his sons, despite their different tastes and personalities. Because he and his sons have no hobbies or interests in common, he also grows to be close to Frasier's producer, Roz Doyle. He invites her to his poker games on numerous occasions, and responds warmly to her laid-back, "one of the guys" personality. On one of his birthdays, she presents him with a six-pack of beers, and this turns out to be the only gift he seems to genuinely enjoy that day.

Despite already being handicapped and retired from the police force, one of Martin's greatest achievements comes in his sixties when he solves the notorious "Weeping Lotus" murder, a cold case that had puzzled himself and the rest of the police force for decades. The resolution brings a long-awaited measure of satisfaction and peace of mind to Martin, who had made a vow to the victim's mother that he would find and arrest the killer, and was becoming concerned that she would die of old age before he did.

Romantically, Martin is reluctant to begin dating again, but while living with Frasier he has a number of relationships with various women. By the end of the show, Martin reacquaints himself with Ronee Lawrence, a woman who, as a teenager babysat Frasier and Niles. They become involved in a romance, which escalates into a marriage proposal. The ceremony takes place in the final episode of the series, establishing a new chapter in Martin's life. Martin died in his early 90s in 2023. The flag at the Washington state capitol was held at half-mast in his honor.

== Personality ==
Unlike his sons, Martin Crane is very down-to-earth and unpretentious. His tastes are generally simpler than those of his sons and reflect popular culture to a greater degree. Martin prefers drinking beer (specifically Ballantine Beer, a lager) to wine or spirits, for example, and prefers watching action movies and professional sports to the opera and theatre preferred by Frasier and Niles. While Martin occasionally visits Café Nervosa to see his sons, he dislikes its elaborate and expensive drinks and often visits a bar, McGinty's, with his best friend, Duke. He is shown to be a big fan of the New York Yankees, Seattle Mariners, the Seattle SuperSonics, and the Seattle Seahawks. He often displays an autographed photo of Ken Griffey Jr., and always listens to Bulldog Briscoe's Gonzo Sports Show on KACL. He likes the music of Frank Sinatra. In the earlier seasons especially, most of the comedy and drama of the series stems from the culture clashes between the refined sons and the blue-collar father (the sons frequently considering themselves superior in both taste and intellectual matters to their father, Niles once admitted that he often does not listen to Martin's advice because he "doesn't have any credentials"), and the struggles between Frasier and Martin in sharing an apartment.

One of the disputes between Frasier and Martin is a decades-old, well-worn recliner that Martin owns; Frasier is appalled by its appearance in his living room. Initially Frasier figures the perfect present for his father is to purchase him an expensive leather recliner that replaces Martin's old one. This greatly upsets Martin when he explains the sentimental value of the chair to Frasier, who feels extreme guilt and proceeds to get the recliner back for his father and returns the new one. Later, Frasier accidentally destroys the chair, and to make amends has a replica built at great expense (remarking that, ironically, it was now the most expensive piece of furniture in his apartment). In one of the series' final episodes, Martin sits in the leather recliner Frasier originally picked and admits he likes it after all.

Martin has a complex and frequently difficult relationship with both his sons, both of whom take after their mother. They have little interest in the traditionally masculine pursuits that interest Martin, such as sports and outdoor activities, just as Martin himself finds little of interest in their pursuits, such as cooking, collecting antiques and opera. Martin also places little stock in (and is frequently and loudly dismissive of) psychiatry, something which—as both of his sons are psychiatrists—also undoubtedly contributed to the rift between them. On a few occasions, he actually exhibits genuine psychological know-how and intellect, surprising Frasier and Niles (although Martin usually waves off these situations and thinks nothing of it; he can, at times, attribute this to his listening to Frasier's radio show). Martin also frequently clashed with and was vocally dismissive of both of his sons' romantic interests (in particular their wives, Maris and Lilith), which also added to the bad feeling between the men. Martin does not hesitate in telling his sons of their attitudes, on one occasion telling them that their mother never displayed snobbery.

Because they share similar blue collar, easygoing personalities, as well as an interest in sports, Martin gets along very well with Frasier's close friend Sam Malone. When Sam visits Frasier, Sam and Martin bond over sports trivia. Martin was also a fan of Sam's when Sam was a baseball player, and says he is "the most important person to set foot in this apartment." Martin also bonds with Norm Peterson on a trip to Boston. (Martin: "Wow, that's some mug callus you've got there." Norm: "Judging from your grip, I'd say you were a can man.")

A dramatic irony frequently shown in the series is that while Frasier and Niles may possess more intellectual knowledge and refinement than Martin, it is in fact Martin who is a wiser and more pragmatic individual. Certainly, Martin possesses greater reserves of common sense and experience than his two sons, and while his sons may be trained in psychiatry, it is frequently Martin's advice in any scenario that is more sound. Much to Frasier's consternation, Martin displays a native intelligence in playing chess, despite his lack of formal education, and he bests Frasier in all but one game. He is usually quick to foresee the catastrophes and crises that Frasier and Niles' various plans and actions will result in, and is capable of advising the best way to avoid this—however, their senses of superiority, stubbornness and neuroses frequently ensure that Frasier and Niles will disregard his advice and blunder into chaos anyway. This can lead to Martin at times taking an almost gleeful delight in the misfortunes and downfalls of his sons, and he is often quick to point out that he told them so. Martin is prone to letting his stubbornness get in the way of happiness, that Frasier often helps him solve, such as forcing Martin to acknowledge his feelings for one romantic partner, Sherry Dempsey.

Martin is a gruff and taciturn man who finds it difficult to express himself emotionally—in particular to his family and loved ones, with whom he can be quite withdrawn and remote. He often comes across as curmudgeonly and ungrateful to Frasier for taking care of him. In the episode "Breaking the Ice", for example, he finds it easier to say the words "I love you" to both his dog Eddie and Duke than he does to either of his sons; when he finally does so, Martin has first heavily imbibed of alcohol, and cannot look Frasier or Niles in the eye as he does so. He is certainly less comfortable with emotional exchanges than either of his sons, who find it much easier to express themselves in such a fashion. His blunt, open manner can make him seem tactless and insensitive. He is quite stubborn, and is given to holding grudges. He has stated that he believes justice should be the same for everyone when he refused to help Niles take care of a legal problem for Maris; he has, nevertheless used his position as an ex-policeman for preferential treatment on occasion, such as when he flashed his badge to a border guard in order to alleviate his suspicions. Martin has also come to his sons and Daphne in need, when concerning police matters by advising them.

For all this, Martin is portrayed as an extremely likable and caring individual. He is usually enthusiastic about making new friends, and although he may find it difficult to express his feelings to his sons, he clearly loves them both, remaining proud of and devoted to them, and bitterly resenting any implication that this might not be the case. When Niles goes to a costume party as Martin and is asked to name his biggest disappointment in life, Niles' response (in character and slightly inebriated) turns this into a speech of his distaste for his and Frasier's pretentiousness, snobbery, and lack of athleticism before finally saying "if I had to choose my two biggest disappointments". Martin quickly cuts him off, angered at being portrayed "as a drunken judgmental jackass", and tells Niles that, while he and Frasier were not what he was expecting, he has always been proud of them.

== Family tree ==
- Noah Crane
  - Martin's unnamed grandfather
    - Martin's unnamed father
      - Martin Crane married to Hester Crane (née Palmer, deceased) and Ronee Crane
        - Frasier Crane (son, with Hester) married to Nanette Guzman (daughter-in-law, divorced) and Lilith Sternin (daughter-in-law, divorced)
          - Frederick Crane (grandson, with Lilith)
        - Niles Crane (son, with Hester) married to Maris Crane (daughter-in-law, divorced), Mel Crane (daughter-in-law, divorced) and to Daphne Moon (daughter-in-law)
          - David Crane (grandson, with Daphne)
          - Unnamed granddaughter mentioned in the Frasier (season 10) episode “Rooms with a View”.
      - Walt Crane (brother) married to Zora Crane (sister-in-law)
        - Nikos Crane (nephew)
