= Cheers season 7 =

Cheers
- Season 7
- Region 1 DVD
- Showrunners: David Angell; Peter Casey; David Lee
- Starring: Ted Danson; Kirstie Alley; Rhea Perlman; John Ratzenberger; Woody Harrelson; Kelsey Grammer; George Wendt
- No. of episodes: 22

Release
- Original network: NBC
- Original release: October 27, 1988 – May 4, 1989

Season chronology
- ← Previous; Season 6 Next → Season 8

The seventh season of the American television sitcom Cheers aired on NBC from October 27, 1988, to May 4, 1989. The show was created by director James Burrows and writers Glen and Les Charles under production team Charles Burrows Charles Productions, in association with Paramount Television.

== Background ==
This season premiered on October 27, 1988, after a long period of reruns, indirectly led by the 1988 Writers Guild of America strike. At the time of the premiere, Night Court moved to Wednesdays, prompting the new series Dear John to fill in that spot. Besides Cheers and Dear John, other series in the Thursday night lineup for the 1988–89 season were The Cosby Show, A Different World, and L.A. Law.

== Cast and characters ==
- Ted Danson as Sam Malone, a bartender and ex-baseball player. He still womanizes with every beautiful woman but fails to impress some, including classier women.
- Kirstie Alley as Rebecca Howe, a corporate bar owner and manager. After her former puppy love Evan Drake departed to Japan in the previous season, Rebecca fantasizes that her newest rich suitor will take over the Lillian Corporation. At other times, she often makes unsuccessful non-romantic attempts to impress her superiors in order to be promoted. Moreover, she completes duties (i.e. odd jobs) for her superiors, like organizing parties and pet sitting.
- Rhea Perlman as Carla Tortelli, a waitress and mother of eight children, including five from her first marriage. Carla is currently married to Eddie LeBec, who begins touring in ice shows outside Massachusetts, putting a strain on their marriage.
- John Ratzenberger as Cliff Clavin, a postal carrier and loquacious bar know-it-all. He starts an on-and-off relationship with a trainee postal worker, Maggie O'Keefe.
- Woody Harrelson as Woody Boyd, a dim bartender. He starts dating Kelly Gaines (Jackie Swanson), the daughter of one of the heads of the Lillian Corporation, Mr. Gaines (Richard Doyle).
- Kelsey Grammer as Frasier Crane, a psychiatrist, now married to Lilith. They are expecting a child.
- George Wendt as Norm Peterson, a semi-employed accountant and painter. He also becomes a house decorator, especially for the Cranes.

Recurring characters

- Bebe Neuwirth as Lilith Sternin, a psychiatrist now married to Frasier. She becomes pregnant with Frasier's child.
- Jay Thomas as Eddie LeBec, a retired hockey player and husband of Carla. He currently works as an ice show performer, which puts a strain on their marriage. Thomas reprises the role of Eddie in two episodes this season.

== Episodes ==
No. overall	No. in season	Title	Directed by	Written by	Original release date	U.S. viewers (millions)	Rating/share/rank (households)
147	1	"How to Recede in Business"	James Burrows	David Angell	October 27, 1988	35.3	24.4 / 38 / #2
Months after former CEO Evan Drake's departure, Lillian Corporation's new vice president, Greg Stone (Brian Bedford), fires Rebecca and rehires Sam as the bar's comeback manager, believing the bar was better-managed under Sam. However, having problems using a computer to send required corporate reports, Sam begs Stone to rehire Rebecca. Stone agrees if Rebecca will: 1) take a slight salary cut, 2) return to business school for a Master of Business Administration, 3) co-manage with Sam and consult him on major decisions, and 4) gain practical experience as a waitress under Carla's supervision during busy times. Sam plans to tell Rebecca these conditions after making love to her. However, at the restaurant Melville's, Sam reluctantly tells her when Stone enters the scene briefly mentioning the conditions. In vengeance, Rebecca fools Sam by acting passionate, planning to storm off and resign. However, Woody tells her that a luxurious red Mercedes-Benz car that she ordered earlier is ready for pickup. Rebecca, eager to afford it, reluctantly agrees to the conditions.
148	2	"Swear to God"	James Burrows	Tom Reeder	November 3, 1988	31.2	21.8 / 33 / #7
Sam swears to three months' celibacy to avoid being named the father of a former lover's baby; his paternity is dismissed. Carla warns Sam, who nearly resumes womanizing, that God will curse him for breaking the vow. After two weeks' celibacy, Sam asks Father Barry (Eric Christmas) for advice, and is disappointed when told to keep the vow to God. A week later, Sam's casual partner Rachel Patterson (Kim Johnston Ulrich) arrives and tempts him away with a photo of herself in a bikini. The following day, Sam tells the gang that he did not sleep with Rachel—in fact, Sam and Rachel went from hotel to hotel, finding a Bible at each one, which he took as a sign from God. Meanwhile, Woody loses the theatrical role of Moses to another actor.
149	3	"Executive Sweet"	James Burrows	Phoef Sutton	November 10, 1988	36.5	23.5 / 35 / #2
150	4	"One Happy Chappy in a Snappy Serape"	James Burrows	Cheri Eichen & Bill Steinkellner	November 17, 1988	31.4	21.4 / 31 / #5
Part 1: Rebecca, relieved that Greg Stone has been fired, is scheduled to meet her new executive vice-president, Martin Teal (Alex Nevil) in his office at 4:30 pm. Meeting him in an elevator, mainly due to his youth and shortness, she rejects his advances, until she realizes he is Mr. Teal. Shocked, Rebecca apologizes for her early behavior but then names Sam as her faux boyfriend to avoid Mr. Teal's advances. He rehires her as the bar's sole manager and demotes Sam to bartender. Sam figures out her excuse when he receives a phone call from Mr. Teal, and fakes a breakup with Rebecca. After a date, Mr. Teal takes her back to the bar and proposes to her, causing her to faint. Meanwhile, Woody buys a hive of more than 4,000 bees which he stores in the office for the day. Woody calms them down with a bee smoker and then takes the bees to his place. Part 2: To interfere with Sam and Rebecca's nonexistent on-and-off relationship, used by Rebecca to avoid continuing a relationship with Mr. Teal or losing her career, Mr. Martin Teal offers Sam employment at another bar in Cancun, Mexico, and hires a one-month exchange bartender. Sam accepts, leaving Rebecca alone and miserable with Mr. Teal. One month later, Sam, enjoying his time in Cancun, purportedly misses his planned corporate flight and instead plans to stay there. Rebecca arrives with an unloaded handgun and tries to persuade him to return to Boston, but Sam calms her down and takes the handgun away. Dejected, Rebecca returns to Boston without Sam. Mr. Teal, impatiently wanting to marry her, arrives with a justice of the peace and his secretary, who is revealed to also be his father. However, much to Rebecca's relief, Sam arrives, interrupting the wedding.
151	5	"Those Lips, Those Ice"	James Burrows	Peter Casey & David Lee	November 24, 1988	30.0	17.3 / 31 / #15
Eddie LeBec (Jay Thomas) returns for a Boston ice show with an attractive, sexy East German skater, Franzi Schrempf (Isa Andersen), making Carla jealous—and Sam desperate to seduce Franzi, who repeatedly rejects his advances. When Carla's jealousy grows out-of-control, Sam berates her for jumping to conclusions. To redeem herself, Carla hosts a poker night for Eddie's buddies and forcibly acts nice. However, when Sam tells Carla that Franzi has a boyfriend—whom Sam saw in her dressing room while attempting to woo her—Carla throws out Eddie's friends along with the food and poker chips wrapped in the tablecloth. As the couple argue, Eddie admits that Franzi mistreated him, that Carla's phony housewife act frightened him, and that Eddie is Carla's always-faithful husband. In the end, Carla reverts to her normal, angry demeanor and tells Eddie to do chores. Meanwhile, Rebecca gives Woody season tickets to football games, including the Patriots–Dolphins night game. Wanting to go with Woody to the game, Norm, Cliff, and Frasier race laps until Norm wins on a technicality, though all of the men are too exhausted to accompany Woody.
152	6	"Norm, Is That You?"	James Burrows	Cheri Eichen & Bill Steinkellner	December 8, 1988	36.4	23.7 / 37 / #3
Frasier and Lilith fire their interior decorator for mocking their taste and notice house-painter Norm artfully rearranging their furniture. Although fearful of losing his reputation as a beer-guzzling, lazy nobody, Norm decorates the Cranes' home, leading to a lucrative offer from Robert and Kim Cooperman (George Deloy and Jane Sibbett). Norm's boorish manners appall the Coopermans, so he pretends to be flamboyantly gay. At Cheers, which they mistake as a gay bar, the Coopermans praise Norm's talent and ask him to decorate their mountain resort. However, they also propose to set him up with a male blind date. Unable to continue the charade, Norm admits the truth. The Coopermans are reluctant to give Norm the resort job until he halves his fee. Meanwhile, a man mistakes Rebecca as pregnant, and Sam preys on her insecurity with fat jokes.
153	7	"How to Win Friends and Electrocute People"	James Burrows	Phoef Sutton	December 15, 1988	35.6	23.7 / 37 / #4
Cliff has appendicitis, but the gang are more interested in Frasier and Lilith's planned countrywide trip, and only Frasier visits Cliff at the hospital. Cliff concludes his own behavior is annoying, and Frasier sarcastically suggests shock treatment, which Cliff takes as an intriguing idea. The following day, Cliff bribes therapist Mr. McManus to give Cliff shock aversion therapy whenever he is his usual know-it-all self at Cheers. However, McManus goes overboard with the treatment on Cliff, who retrieves the shock button during a struggle, sending McManus running while Cliff accidentally shocks himself. Cliff admits everything and exits the bar, pretending to run off. The astounded gang is reluctant to chase after Cliff to take him back except Norm (when Cliff prompts him). The gang then apologizes to Cliff for not visiting him in the hospital. Cliff orders champagne to celebrate, but Al (Al Rosen) shocks him with the button for the fun of it. Meanwhile, Sam gives Lilith driving lessons for the countrywide trip, but becomes furious when she flips-off and races another driver.
154	8	"Jumping Jerks"	James Burrows	Ken Levine & David Isaacs	December 22, 1988	31.3	20.6 / 34 / #3
After watching The Magnificent Seven (an earlier reference was in "Diane Chambers' Day"), Woody, Cliff, and Norm decide to seek thrills. When Woody comes up with skydiving, Norm and Cliff are reluctant, even when the trainer Bob Speakes (J. Kenneth Campbell) encourages them. However, when Carla calls the trio "weenies" for their reluctance, they grudgingly agree to attend a training session with Bob. The following day, the three chicken out, so they fabricate their nonexistent courage to their bar mates. Sam, who wants to try it with them, finds out about this during their next session. Ironically, the four of them chicken out; when they re-fabricate their courageous move, Rebecca begs them to do it again with the "Cheers" flag banner on-camera. The men reluctantly decide to go at Sam's behest because Rebecca yearns for a man who never fears danger. Finally, the men skydive, but Rebecca goes out with Bob instead.
155	9	"Send in the Crane"	James Burrows	David Lloyd	January 5, 1989	37.9	25.1 / 37 / #4
Rebecca throws a children's birthday party for the son of her boss, Mr. Ridgeway. When Woody, whom she hires as a clown at Frasier's suggestion, decides to substitute as Mark Antony in a theatrical play, a reluctant Frasier is pressured into substituting. Frasier performs poorly until he soaks Rebecca with a squirting flower, to the delight of the children. When the party dies down, Rebecca relates a warning from Woody about the handkerchief gag: if pulled from the shirt pocket, the pants fall down, revealing the supposed clown underpants, although Woody forgot to give these to Frasier (Woody was wearing them himself). Her boss's wife, Mrs. Ridgeway (Patricia Morison), introduces Frasier to her mother. When Mrs. Ridgeway's mother sneezes, Frasier habitually offers the handkerchief for her, which reveals himself wearing nothing underneath (since he took off the skimpy French underwear that Lilith gave him earlier), causing Mrs. Ridgeway's mother to faint. Meanwhile, Sam is attracted to both his old girlfriend Judy Marlow (Sandahl Bergman) and her grown daughter Laurie (Chelsea Noble), who later reveals to be engaged, devastating Sam.
156	10	"Bar Wars II: The Woodman Strikes Back"	James Burrows	Ken Levine & David Isaacs	January 12, 1989	39.2	25.4 / 38 / #3
Cheers is hosting a Bloody Mary contest. The gang seek to win against their rival, Gary's Olde Towne Tavern, yet Woody inadvertently foils his gang's every scheme. To compensate that, Woody eavesdrops at Gary's (Joel Polis) bar, but ends up tied and hanged upside-down outside Cheers. When the gang scold him, Woody becomes angry, quits Cheers, and goes to work at Gary's bar. One week later, Woody tells Gary that the contest already started and admits that his "failing" to notify Gary is part of Sam and Woody's plan to set Gary up. Woody escapes from Gary's gang and later poses as a bearded contest judge, fooling them. Woody admits to the Cheers crowd that the events were all part of Sam and Woody's scheme—but Gary reenters Cheers, winning the contest with the real judge. However, after Gary's gang leaves, Carla pays money, taken from Gary's wallet, to the judge, who is actually her next door neighbor. The Cheers crowd loudly chants "Gary won't win!", but Gary astoundingly reenters to retrieve his wallet, still unaware the real contest has yet to occur. Joel Polis and Robert Desiderio alternately reprise the role of Gary in other episodes. The actor who portrays Carla's neighbor posing as the judge remains uncredited.
157	11	"Adventures in Housesitting"	James Burrows	Patricia Niedzialek & Cecile Alch	January 19, 1989	35.4	22.7 / 34 / #4
Rebecca pet-sits for her boss Mr. Sheridan (Michael Currie), who is away on corporate business. Sam enters Sheridan's manor one night and then, attempting unsuccessfully to seduce Rebecca, allows Sheridan's champion dog Buster to escape. To conceal this negligence, Woody brings in Satan, a wrecking yard's dog resembling Buster. After a neighbor retrieves Buster, Sam brings Buster through the backdoor to switch the dogs in the kitchen, while Rebecca distracts Mr. Sheridan. Back at Cheers, Cliff accidentally says the attack word, causing Satan to trap him in the men's room. Carla snatches the phone number from Woody and calls the wrecking yard but then exits the bar, leaving Cliff still trapped. Meanwhile, Frasier imagines people around him naked at Carla's suggestion to ease his nerves over his upcoming speech, causing him to be late for a convention the following day.
158	12	"Please Mr. Postman"	James Burrows	Brian Pollack & Mert Rich	February 2, 1989	38.3	24.7 / 37 / #5
Cliff trains a new postal worker, Margaret O'Keefe (Annie Golden), and they begin a forbidden relationship at a motel. However, Maggie parked a postal vehicle at the motel, raising suspicions. Cliff fabricates a story of armed thugs hijacking the vehicle for a joyride, but their relationship sours over the deception. Maggie confesses to their superiors and is fired from the US Postal Service, while Cliff is reassigned to another postal district. Maggie decides to work at Canada Post and asks Cliff to join her. Ultimately, Cliff decides to stay when the gang sing "The Ballad of the Green Berets", reminding him that he has friends in Boston and pride in his uniform. Meanwhile, Sam learns that an old song made Rebecca aroused when she was in high school, and suspects from a telephone call with her mother that the song was "You've Lost That Lovin' Feelin'". Sam plays a recording of the song in the bar office and dances with Rebecca, but she becomes motionless and appears disinterested. When Sam leaves the room, Rebecca's calm façade breaks, and she accidentally kisses Norm, who enters the room. In original broadcast and some syndication prints, the Righteous Brothers song played is "You've Lost That Loving Feeling". However, in DVD and other prints, the substitute song by the same musical duo is "Unchained Melody".
159	13	"Golden Boyd"	James Burrows	Cheri Eichen & Bill Steinkellner	February 6, 1989	25.7	17.3 / 25 / #23
Rebecca organizes a party for her boss Mr. Gaines's (Richard Doyle) daughter, Kelly (Jackie Swanson), enlisting Woody and Sam to serve guests. Woody gets into trouble conversing with sophisticated but brutish Nash (Tyrone Power Jr.) and his friends, almost leading to a brawl. Sam delays the fight—which resumes the following day at Cheers when Nash knocks out Woody with one punch. To get even, Woody asks out Nash's girlfriend, Kelly Gaines. Woody asks Mr. Gaines permission to date Kelly, but neither he nor Nash approves of Woody's lower-class status. However, Kelly decides to date Woody to spite Nash for being domineering towards her. Eventually, the two realize they like each other. This episode originally aired on Monday, February 6, 1989, at 10:00 pm Eastern / 9:00 pm Central. The series' original timeslot was preempted by George H. W. Bush's live Presidential Address three days later (February 9, 1989) at 9:00 pm Eastern / 6:00 pm Pacific.
160	14	"I Kid You Not"	James Burrows	Story by : Rick Beren; Teleplay by : Rod Burton	February 16, 1989	35.1	22.8 / 35 / #4
Frasier and Lilith encounter Carla's son Ludlow (Jarrett Lennon), whose biological father and Frasier's former mentor Bennett Ludlow (from "Whodunit?") never visited despite providing financial support. Realizing that Ludlow is intelligent and likes high culture, the Cranes take Ludlow to an opera. Afterwards, a cheerful Ludlow wants to do more activities with them. Devastated, Carla reluctantly agrees. The following day, the Cranes make reservations at fancy restaurant Magritte's. At Margritte's, Ludlow has a conflict with the Cranes and gives Frasier a hot foot. After Carla escorts Ludlow out of the restaurant, Frasier declares they should never have children. Lilith then reveals her pregnancy to Frasier's joy. Meanwhile, Sam reluctantly allows Woody to borrow his red Chevrolet Corvette for Woody's latest date with Kelly.
161	15	"Don't Paint Your Chickens"	James Burrows	Ken Levine & David Isaacs	February 23, 1989	35.1	23.3 / 35 / #5
To impress her superiors, Rebecca promotes Norm's painting business, blackmailing him with his bar tab to accept her offer to work with him. After a client hires Norm, Rebecca learns that a rival was promoted to advertising director, prompting her to angrily confront Mr. Anawalt (Stefan Gierasch) for under-appreciating her. However, Norm's client signs a contract with other painters. Norm rushes to stop Rebecca, using a window washer's platform to show Rebecca a "NO JOB" sign outside the window. Rebecca, nevertheless, berates Anawalt for overlooking her talents. Anawalt is impressed with her courage and wants to promote her, but ends up arrested by the FBI for inside trading. Meanwhile, Sam is exhausted by his casual partner Erin's (Lisa Aliff) sports activities, like cycling.
162	16	"The Cranemakers"	Andy Ackerman	Phoef Sutton	March 2, 1989	35.9	24.3 / 37 / #4
Frasier scolds Lilith for embarrassing everyone with melodramatic pregnancy speeches. The following day, the Cranes reconcile using a stethoscope to hear their unborn child's heartbeat, and decide to leave civilization and settle in nature. Sam loans the Cranes a cabin in northern Maine for a week's trial, postponing their permanent move. Frasier struggles to make fire by striking rocks together. While they prepare old newspaper to catch a spark Frasier struggles to create, Lilith notices a review of an elegant restaurant. They eventually become homesick and decide to return to Boston. Meanwhile, Woody is sent on a one-week corporate-paid vacation to Italy, but misses his flight and joyously spends the week at the airport, where he meets people from all over the world. Woody tells the gang about his journey and decides to have another vacation at a bus depot. Carla receives her rich grandfather's inheritance which, after pilfering by his illegitimate son, amounts to 25 cents.
163	17	"Hot Rocks"	James Burrows	Ken Levine & David Isaacs	March 16, 1989	33.5	22.5 / 35 / #5
Sam and Rebecca are dressed-up for the USS Constitution tour, but their respective dates cancel. Rebecca is reluctant to go with Sam, who brings Admiral William J. Crowe, the Chairman of the Joint Chiefs of Staff, from the tour and introduces him around the bar. Hours later, after the Admiral leaves, Rebecca cannot find her $32,000 diamond earrings and assumes that the Admiral stole them. Sam interrupts the gang's experiments—making noises (like stretching fingers, whistling, and doing armpit sounds) and a "blue spark" by chewing a Life Savers candy—enlisting Woody, Cliff, and Norm to reenact what happened. During this, Rebecca recalls that the Admiral had a glass of water while using the phone and put it next to another glass that might have had her earrings, leading Sam to realize that the earrings are still in an empty used glass. Sam retrieves and returns the earrings, and then lies down on the table hoping for her to seduce him. Rebecca still resents him, so they have a heart-to-heart conversation about each other and kiss as a test. Rebecca secretly feels aroused and says "Maybe" but is embarrassed when Sam overhears that and teases her.
164	18	"What's Up, Doc?"	James Burrows	Brian Pollack & Mert Rich	March 30, 1989	36.8	24.4 / 39 / #5
Sam is attracted to Frasier and Lilith's colleague, Dr. Sheila Rydall (Madolyn Smith), who rejects his advances. Sam has the gang help him feign impotence to get an appointment with her, where he plans to have her cure him. Sheila sees the ploy and counters it by assigning him to group therapy, prompting him to admit the charade. To make up, she reluctantly goes to dinner with him the following night at Melville's. Afterwards, Sam and Sheila head downstairs to the bar at closing time, and their conversations goes well until she tells him under pressure that, as a psychologist, she thinks he has meaningless sex to fill the void of his empty life. Aghast, Sam tells Sheila to leave as she tries to excite him without avail. Rebecca exits the office and tries to help Sam, prompting him for something he does that is not in pursuit of sex. As Sam struggles to answer, Rebecca asks him about the Three Stooges; Sam eventually grasps that enjoyment of the Stooges is a simple pleasure having nothing to do with sex.
165	19	"The Gift of the Woodi"	James Burrows	Phoef Sutton	April 6, 1989	32.2	22.2 / 36 / #3
Woody fears that expensive gifts from Kelly's wealthy peers would surpass his on her birthday party. Frasier suggests that Woody give Kelly something priceless, coming from his heart. At the party, Woody plays a piano and sings "Kelly, Kelly, Kelly, Kelly..." (also called "The Kelly Song") as his gift. Kelly, liking the song, is unconvinced that it is his real gift; humiliated, Woody runs off. The following day, when Kelly visits Cheers looking for his gift, Woody explains that they are too different to continue the relationship. Realizing his mistake, Woody then seriously buys her an expensive pendant per Sam's sarcastic advice. Initially excited, Kelly wants a chain to carry the pendant until Woody convinces her that he could afford neither. Feeling bad, she gives him back the pendant, so they reconcile. Meanwhile, Cliff makes recipes containing the hybrid ingredient "beetabega", a fictional hybrid of beetroot and rutabaga. Rebecca, feeling too attractive and sexy, dresses like Lilith to impress her superiors; instead, they offer Lilith a vice president position for the corporation's eastern seaboard division.
166	20	"Call Me Irresponsible"	James Burrows	Dan O'Shannon & Tom Anderson	April 13, 1989	32.6	22.3 / 36 / #3
Carla anticipates surprising Eddie on their second anniversary, but he fails to arrive. Hiding her devastation, she sends herself flowers to the bar, but Woody notifies her in front of everyone that the florist phoned wanting cash rather than credit cards. A while later, her son Anthony drops off a box of laundry, leading her to near despair. Eddie phones Carla, saying he was called at the last moment to rehearse for the rewritten ice stage adaptation of The Three Little Pigs. Although she is pleased, Carla asks if Sam told Eddie about their anniversary. Sam denies this, and Carla places a curse that Sam's tongue will swell if he lies. When Carla exits, Sam's tongue becomes swollen. Meanwhile, Woody wins three bets on a basketball game, with Rebecca winning the last betting round. The bar patrons are almost caught by a police detective for illegal gambling, but Rebecca convinces him that it is a charade and gives the money back to the patrons, though she retrieves the money when he leaves. Frasier and Lilith hire Norm to redecorate their unborn child's room as gender-neutral and without popular children's icons (that might lower a child's intellect).
167	21	"Sisterly Love"	James Burrows	David Lloyd	April 27, 1989	30.0	20.8 / 34 / #3
Rebecca's actress sister, Susan (Marcia Cross), arrives at Cheers to reconcile with a displeased Rebecca. Sam sees their estrangement as seduction leverage and takes them to lunch at Melville's. Sam questions why the sisters argue, and Rebecca admits to battles over past love interests before storming out. Exploiting their rivalry, Sam claims that Rebecca is attracted to him, gaining a date with Susan. When he notifies Rebecca, she becomes furious and tells Sam to break it off so she can date him, albeit reluctantly. Sam postpones his date with Susan to date Rebecca instead. At closing time, while Sam is expecting Rebecca, Susan enters the bar appearing too excited to wait and kisses him in the office. Rebecca catches them and apparently shoots Susan several times. Shocked, Sam helps Rebecca carry Susan's body into the bar, where the gang surprise him by appearing behind the counter. Susan's "murder" was a charade to spite Sam for his behavior, and the sisters are reconciled. Joan Severance was originally cast as Susan Howe. She and Sam were supposed to have a whirlwind romance, and Sam was supposed to propose marriage in her. Producers found this unsuitable for promiscuous Sam. Also, Severance had scheduling conflicts. Therefore, the character and the story were rewritten as one-time, and producers picked Marcia Cross instead. Lilith's mother is mentioned but does not appear in this episode. Marilyn Cooper would later portray Lilith's mother, Betty Sternin, for the episode "Smotherly Love" (season 10, episode 20).
168	22	"The Visiting Lecher"	James Burrows	David Lloyd	May 4, 1989	30.5	20.8 / 33 / #3
Marriage specialist Dr. Lawrence Crandall (John McMartin) arrives in Boston for a book tour and a drink with Frasier. Dr. Crandall asks Rebecca whether she is attracted to him; annoyed, she repeatedly rejects the idea. Sam and Frasier convince her that the question was professional, so Rebecca goes to Dr. Crandall's table to apologize, but is repulsed when he comes on to her again. Unable to convince Sam and Frasier that she is being sexually harassed, Rebecca drags Sam to Dr. Crandall's hotel room. There, they find a maid, Maria (Fabiana Udenio), in the closet and a violinist entering the room. Dr. Crandall admits that he planned to seduce Maria and fears that his career and fifteen-year marriage with Valerie (Joanna Barnes) would be over if exposed. When Valerie arrives, the guests go inside the closet at Lawrence's behest. The Crandalls plan to have dinner together, but Lawrence accidentally puts on Maria's blue coat, so Valerie senses someone inside the closet. When Valerie demands they explain, Rebecca reveals Lawrence's conduct. Valerie is unconvinced as Lawrence passes the claims as coincidences, so Rebecca insults Valerie and then physically attacks her. Sam and Zoltan restrain and remove Rebecca. This episode originally intended to reprise Dr. Simon Finch-Royce, John Cleese's character from the fifth season episode "Simon Says". However, Cleese was unavailable, so this episode was rewritten in order to replace his character with Dr. Lawrence Crandall.

Specials

No.	Title	Original release date	U.S. viewers (millions)	Rating/share/rank (households)
S04	"Mickey's 60th Birthday"	November 13, 1988	23.1	12.9 / 20 / #29
In the Cheers segment, amnesiac Mickey Mouse, reported as missing, enters the bar, unrecognized by bar patrons, to order two root beer floats but is penniless. To compensate, Sam, wanting to seduce Rebecca, tells Mickey to sing "Happy Birthday to You" as a birthday gift to Rebecca, who eventually sobs over being "old and alone." Then Mickey cheers her up by telling her to get a new outlook and appreciation, so Rebecca takes Mickey out to dinner and a movie, much to Sam's chagrin. Aired as an episode of The Magical World of Disney on NBC at 7 pm ET/PT. It also features skits of NBC shows, like Family Ties, L.A. Law, and Hunter.

== Production ==
Writers and producers David Angell, Peter Casey, and David Lee left the series in March 1989 for an upcoming production company, which became Grub Street Productions, which would later produce Wings and Frasier.

== Reception ==
This season landed in fourth place with an average 22.5 rating and 35 share as of April 20, 1989. The Pittsburgh Post-Gazette described the character of Rebecca Howe as "annoying", and expressed pleasure at rumors that Joan Severance (originally set to play Susan Howe, a role eventually portrayed by Marcia Cross) could replace Kirstie Alley, contending that Shelley Long's departure in the fifth season was still affecting the series. Another syndicate columnist Joe Stein found the sixth and seventh seasons "good [yet] somewhat watered down", and found Rebecca not as "compelling" as her predecessor Diane. Conversely, Herb Caen of the San Francisco Chronicle praised this season, including the cast ensemble and their performances, but still missed departed characters Coach and Diane.

Todd Fuller of Sitcoms Online called this season "strong". David Johnson of DVD Verdict rated the story 90 percent and the acting 95 percent, praising its episodic approach and departure from story arcs, like Sam and Diane's relationship or Rebecca's failed attempts to win Evan Drake last season. He praised Alley as "a solid comic force" for her "over-the-top portrayal of neurosis". Jeffrey Robinson of DVD Talk gave this season three and a half stars out of five and gave a replay value of four, calling it "good" and its episodes "fun and amusing". Current Film called this season a "strong roll" with "fine performances".

== Accolades ==
In the 41st Primetime Emmy Awards (1989), this season won three Emmys: Outstanding Comedy Series of 1988–1989, Outstanding Supporting Actor in a Comedy Series (Woody Harrelson), and Outstanding Supporting Actress in a Comedy Series (Rhea Perlman). In the 3rd Annual American Comedy Awards, Perlman was awarded as the Funniest Supporting Actress for her character Carla Tortelli.

== DVD release ==
Cheers: The Complete Seventh Season
Set Details
22 episodes; 4-disc set; 1:33:1 aspect ratio; English – Stereo; Closed captioning (Region 1); Subtitles: Danish, Dutch, English, Norwegian, Spanish (Region 2)
Release Dates
Region 1	Region 2	Region 4
November 15, 2005	May 18, 2009	April 27, 2009

== Notes ==
=== References ===
- Bjorklund, Dennis A (2014) [First published in 1993 as print edition]. Cheers TV Show: A Comprehensive Reference (e-Book ed.). Praetorian Publishing. ISBN 9780967985237.
