= The Pursuit of Happiness (1995 TV series) =

1995 American TV series

- Genre: Sitcom
- Created by: David Hackel
- Developed by: David Angell; Peter Casey; David Lee
- Starring: Tom Amandes; Melinda McGraw; Larry Miller; Brad Garrett; Meredith Scott Lynn
- Composer: Bruce Miller
- Country of origin: United States
- Original language: English
- No. of seasons: 1
- No. of episodes: 13 (7 unaired) (list of episodes)

Production
- Executive producers: Dave Hackel; David Angell; Peter Casey; David Lee
- Producers: Maggie Blanc; Barry Gurstein; David Pitlik
- Camera setup: Multi-camera
- Running time: 30 minutes
- Production companies: Grub Street Productions; Paramount Television

Original release
- Network: NBC
- Release: September 19 – November 7, 1995

The Pursuit of Happiness is an American sitcom television series created by David Hackel, that aired on NBC from September 19 to November 7, 1995.

== Premise ==
An idealistic lawyer is having a mid-life crisis early in life while having to deal with his unemployed wife and her annoying brother.

== Cast ==
- Tom Amandes as Steve Rutledge
- Melinda McGraw as McKenzie Rutledge
- Larry Miller as Larry Rutledge
- Brad Garrett as Alex Chosek
- Meredith Scott Lynn as Jean Mathias
- Maxine Stuart as Eleanor Rutledge

== Episodes ==
No.	Title	Directed by	Written by	Original release date	Prod. code	Viewers (millions)
1	"Pilot" "Celebrations in Hell"	David Lee	David Hackel	September 19, 1995	40200–001	15.4
Steve's wife loses her job and his brother-in-law moves in.
2	"Nothing But the Truth"	David Lee	Dave Hackel	September 26, 1995	40200–003	13.1
Steve and McKenzie decide to lie to each other about how things are going at work.
3	"Wedding Dates"	Rod Daniel	Dave Hackel	October 10, 1995	40200–004	17.0
Steve, Alex and Jean have no dates for a wedding they have to attend.
4	"New Guy in Town"	Rod Daniel	Bob Tischler	October 17, 1995	40200–002	N/A
McKenzie tries to get new friends.
5	"Losing It"	Jeff Melman	Suzanne Martin	October 31, 1995	40200–005	13.0
McKenzie thinks she is losing her looks, but a handsome Italian thinks otherwise.
6	"Just a Dream"	Kim Friedman	Dave Hackel	November 7, 1995	40200–007	11.4
Steve has a dream where McKenzie has sex with another man.
7	"The Transference"	Rob Schiller	Jim O'Doherty & David M. Israel	Unaired	40200–008	N/A
An old friend of McKenzie comes for a visit.
8	"Sleeping with the Enemy"	Kim Friedman	David Pitlik & Barry Gurstein	Unaired	40200–006	N/A
A client of Alex is interested in him.
9	"The First Christmas"	Jeff Melman	Stephen Godchaux	Unaired	40200–009	N/A
Larry arranges a Christmas party for Steve and McKenzie.
10	"The Lost Weekend"	Alan Myerson	April Kelly	Unaired	40200–010	N/A
Steve and McKenzie tries to have a honeymoon without Larry.
11	"Will Power"	Kim Friedman	David Pitlik & Barry Gurstein	Unaired	40200–011	N/A
Steve doesn't like the old millionaire who plans to marry Gram.
12	"Court Case"	Rob Schiller	Sy Rosen	Unaired	40200–013	N/A
Steve and Alex are opponents in a court case.
13	"Mr. Funny Pants"	N/A	Bob Tischler	Unaired	40200–012	N/A
An ad agency hires McKenzie to write a jingle for them.
