= Encore! Encore! =

American sitcom television series

- Genre: Sitcom
- Created by: David Angell; Peter Casey; David Lee; Chuck Ranberg; Anne Flett-Giordano
- Written by: John Augustine Anne Flett-Giordano
- Directed by: Sheldon Epps; Pamela Fryman
- Starring: Nathan Lane; Joan Plowright; Glenne Headly
- Composer: Bruce Miller
- Country of origin: United States
- Original language: English
- No. of seasons: 1
- No. of episodes: 13 (2 unaired)

Production
- Executive producers: David Angell; Peter Casey; David Lee; Chuck Ranberg; Anne Flett-Giordano; Nathan Lane
- Producer: Mary Fukuto
- Camera setup: Multi-camera
- Running time: 22–24 minutes
- Production companies: Grub Street Productions; Paramount Television

Original release
- Network: NBC
- Release: September 22, 1998 – January 27, 1999

Encore! Encore! is an American sitcom television series created by David Angell, Peter Casey, David Lee, Chuck Ranberg and Anne Flett-Giordano, starring Nathan Lane as an opera singer. On the verge of becoming "The Fourth Tenor", Lane's character injures his vocal cords and must move in with his family, who run a vineyard in Northern California. The series premiered on NBC on September 22, 1998, airing on Tuesdays at 8:30 p.m.

Encore! Encore! struggled in the ratings from the start. After its fourth episode aired on October 27, 1998, NBC put the series on hiatus for almost two months. It returned in December with the show now airing on Wednesdays at 9:30. The final network episode aired on January 27, 1999. Thirteen episodes were ordered but when the series was cancelled at midseason two episodes were left unaired. All 13 episodes later ran on Bravo.

== Cast ==
- Nathan Lane as Joseph Pinoni
- Joan Plowright as Marie Pinoni
- Glenne Headly as Franceseca Pinoni
- Trevor Fehrman as Michael Pinoni
- Ernie Sabella as Leo Wodecki
- James Patrick Stuart as Claude Bertrand

== Episodes ==
No.	Title	Directed by	Written by	Original release date	Prod. code
1	"Pilot"	David Lee	Story by : David Angell & Peter Casey & David Lee & Chuck Ranberg & Anne Flett-Giordano; Teleplay by : Chuck Ranberg & Anne Flett-Giordano	September 22, 1998	40209-001
2	"I Am Joe's Ego"	Pamela Fryman	Charlie Hauck	September 29, 1998	40209-002
3	"The French Connection"	Michael Lembeck	Story by : Valerie Curtin & Jon Sherman; Teleplay by : Jon Sherman	October 20, 1998	40209-003
4	"Master Class"	Ken Levine	Jon Sherman	October 27, 1998	40209-004
5	"Sour Grapes"	Sheldon Epps	Brown Mandell	December 16, 1998	40209-005
6	"The Diary"	Jeff Melman	Christina Lynch	December 23, 1998	40209-007
7	"Mr. Joe's Wild Ride"	Michael Lembeck	Jon Sherman	December 30, 1998	40209-009
8	"I Know How Caged Bird Tastes"	Jeff Melman	Charlie Hauck	January 6, 1999	40209-011
9	"Crime and Punishment"	Michael Lembeck	Christina Lynch	January 13, 1999	40209-012
10	"To Soeur with Love"	Jeff Melman	Chuck Ranberg & Anne Flett-Giordano	January 20, 1999	40209-010
11	"The Doubt of the Benefit"	Ken Levine	John Augustine	January 27, 1999	40209-013
12	"A Review to Remember"	N/A	David Isaacs	Unaired	40209-006
13	"Soul Food"	N/A	Charlie Hauck	Unaired	40209-008

== Critical reception ==
A New York Observer review described the show as "the 'Moose Murders' of sitcoms -- it won't be here past Halloween, but the recollection of its awfulness will give you untold delight for years to come." For The Washington Post, Tom Shales described Lane's character as "a nagging fussbudget who makes unreasonable demands on all those around him". TeeVee.org writer Chris Rywalt observed that Lane spoke with "one of those upper-crust anti-accent accents" on the show and added: "Once the show gets beyond the accents, it collapses humorlessly." In contrast, The New York Times gave a very positive review to the show's debut, saying it possessed the "most accomplished, high-powered cast on television."
