= Dave Hackel =

American producer and screenwriter

Dave Hackel is an American producer and screenwriter. He is best known for creating, writing and producing the CBS sitcom Becker, which starred Ted Danson and ran from 1998 until 2004.

Hackel grew up in Delaware, Ohio. He later moved to Los Angeles, California in the 1970s, where he had started working as a game show staffer. He started writing with Steve Hattman as a writing partner for television shows and for projects such as the 1980 television movie The Great American Traffic Jam. Aside from all his work on Becker, Hackel has also worked on episodes of Frasier, The Love Boat, Wings, Dear John, Out of This World, Webster, 9 to 5, Fish, LateLine, Harper Valley PTA, Gridlock, Shirley and The Pursuit of Happiness.

Hackel wrote columns for The Huffington Post, in 2011.
