= David Angell Humanitarian Award =

- Country: United States
- Presented by: American Screenwriters Association
- Website: (archived link)

The David Angell Humanitarian Award, in honor of David Angell, is an award given to individuals in the entertainment industry who contribute to global wellbeing through donations of time, expertise or other support to improve the human condition.

The American Screenwriters Association established the award with permission from the Angell family.

== Recipients ==
- Chuck Lorre, 2008
- Will and Jada Pinkett Smith, 2006
- John Walsh, 2005
- Sting, 2004
- Mary Tyler Moore, 2003
