= The Gift of the Woodi =

- Cheers episode
- Episode no.: Season 7 Episode 19
- Directed by: James Burrows
- Written by: Phoef Sutton
- Original air date: April 6, 1989
- Running time: 30 minutes (including commercials)

Guest appearances
- Bebe Neuwirth as Lilith Sternin-Crane; Richard Doyle as Mr. Walter Gaines; Jackie Swanson as Kelly Gaines

Episode chronology
← Previous "What's Up, Doc?"	Next → "Call Me Irresponsible"
- Cheers (season 7)

"The Gift of the Woodi" is the nineteenth episode of the seventh season of the American television sitcom, Cheers, written by Phoef Sutton and directed by James Burrows. It originally aired on April 6, 1989, on NBC. In this episode, Woody Boyd sings a self-penned song "Kelly Kelly Kelly Kelly...", also called "The Kelly Song", as his birthday gift to his girlfriend Kelly Gaines. Cliff plans to popularize his invention "beetabaga", a vegetable hybrid of rutabaga and beetroot. Rebecca wants to downgrade her sexual appeal in attempt to impress her superiors. The song has been praised by the critics. It was also performed by a couple other performers and actor Woody Harrelson himself a few times, portrayer of Woody Boyd.

== Plot ==
Walter Gaines (Richard Doyle), one of Lillian Corporation's vice presidents, invites his daughter Kelly's boyfriend Woody Boyd (Woody Harrelson), whom Kelly (Jackie Swanson) has dated since the episode "Golden Boyd" (season 7, episode 13), to her birthday party at the Gaines manor. The Cheers gang convinces Woody that Mr. Gaines is using him and that Woody will embarrass himself in front of Kelly's rich peers because he cannot afford expensive gifts. Frasier Crane (Kelsey Grammer) suggests that now-reluctant Woody give Kelly something priceless, coming from his heart. At the party, Woody plays a piano and sings a self-penned song "Kelly Kelly Kelly Kelly...", also called "The Kelly Song", as his gift and dedicates it to Kelly. Kelly likes the song but is not convinced that it is his real gift; humiliated, Woody runs off.

The following day, when Kelly visits Cheers looking for her gift, Woody explains that the song is his real gift. Kelly still remains unconvinced, so Woody tell her that they are too different to see each other anymore. After she leaves, Sam Malone (Ted Danson), while consoling Woody, suggests sarcastically that he buy her jewelry. Woody takes the suggestion seriously and eventually gives her an expensive pendant at the manor to compensate what he said earlier at Cheers. Kelly, having been excited initially, then wants a chain that will enable her to wear the pendant. Frustrated, Woody tells her that he spent most of his money on the pendant and can afford neither a chain nor the pendant. Convinced by his sincerity and feeling bad, Kelly returns the pendant to him and says that the song was "pretty". He asks her, "The tune or the words?" She answers, "The words especially." Woody tells her that he "ripped off the tune". Then he tells her he has another gift saying, "I love you." Finally accepting that Woody's gifts come from his heart, Kelly mentions that she abandoned her plan to give him a Porsche on his upcoming birthday, stunning him.

Meanwhile, Cliff Clavin (John Ratzenberger) brags about his invention, "beetabaga", a fictional vegetable hybrid of rutabaga and beetroot, irritating the gang. Later, McDonald's declines to use it as an ingredient. Cliff gives away samples of "beetabaga"-made recipes for anyone to eat. Feedback from the bar patrons has been negative, but Cliff offers the samples elsewhere, hoping for a more positive reception.

Rebecca Howe (Kirstie Alley) is feeling too attractive and sexy and turns to Lilith Sternin-Crane (Bebe Neuwirth) for help to impress her corporate superiors who she believes are ignoring her. Lilith does a makeover on Rebecca, so Rebecca resembles her. The plan backfires, however, when Rebecca's superiors at a restaurant meeting offer Lilith the vice presidential position at Lillian Corporation's east coast division.

== Production ==
Phoef Sutton wrote "The Gift of the Woodi"; James Burrows directed the episode. Vaughn Armstrong portrayed Kelly's uncle Val, who gives her a key to a Mercedes-Benz car at her birthday party.

== Reception ==
The episode originally aired at 9:00 pm (Eastern) / 8:00 pm (Central) on April 6, 1989, against CBS's The Equalizer and a re-broadcast of ABC's television movie Rock 'n' Roll Mom. For the week of April 3–9, it scored a 22.2 rating and a 36 share, and was watched by an estimate of 32.2 million viewers, finishing third in Nielsen ratings.

The scene where Woody sings "Kelly, Kelly, Kelly, Kelly..." at Kelly Gaines's birthday party is described by David Hofstede in his book 5000 Episodes and No Commercials as one of series' "great moments". Andy Greene of Rolling Stone magazine said that the song "stuck in the minds of many Cheers fans", and St. Louis Post-Dispatch columnist Joe Holleman called Woody Harrelson's performance of the song "touching".

Joseph J. and Kate Darowski in their 2019 book Cheers: A Cultural History rated the episode all four stars ("great episode"), citing Bebe Neuwirth's "fantastic" performance in the episode as the main reason for the rating. The Darowskis wrote that the makeover subplot of the episode and the makeover plot from "Abnormal Psychology" (season 5, episode 4), where Diane gives Lilith a huge makeover to bring Lilith and Frasier Crane together, "highlight unfortunate television and cultural ideals around women".

== Legacy ==
Australian rock band Smudge recorded "The Kelly Song" on their 1993 album Manilow. Actor Woody Harrelson sang the song in front of patrons outside the California Film Institute in October 2009, and during his appearance at the Ringling College of Art and Design in January 2018. "The Kelly Song" was also performed by The Roots on Late Night with Jimmy Fallon when Kelly Ripa entered the set as Fallon's guest. Professional wrestler Kelly Kelly said in her interview on a podcast series The Steve Austin Show that her ring name was based on the song.

== In popular culture ==
A character Rob narrating Nick Hornby's novel High Fidelity chooses the episode featuring "The Kelly Song" as one of his top five favorite episodes of Cheers. One of Rob's friends Barry says that Rob is wrong about four of the five episodes, lacks a "sense of humor", and is the series' "undeserving and unappreciative viewer".
