= The Great American Traffic Jam =

- Cover of one version of VHS release of movie
- Genre: Comedy
- Written by: Dave Hackel; Steve Hattman
- Directed by: James Frawley
- Music by: Arthur B. Rubinstein
- Country of origin: United States
- Original language: English

Production
- Executive producers: Greg Strangis; Sam Strangis
- Running time: 96 minutes
- Production company: Ten-Four Productions

Original release
- Network: NBC
- Release: October 2, 1980

The Great American Traffic Jam (alternate title Gridlock) is a 1980 American made-for-television movie which first aired on NBC on October 2, 1980. The comedy revolves around a large "all-star" cast getting stuck in a massive Los Angeles area traffic jam, with multiple interweaving story lines among those stuck.

== Background and reception ==
The movie debuted on NBC on Thursday October 2, 1980. The TV Guide summary of the week's TV movies described it as a film that "provides stale characters in staler situations," but another promotional blurb in the same issue stated "what sets this 1980 TV-movie apart are its flashes of wit, delivered in a running commentary by a glib disc jockey (Howard Hesseman) and its satirically staged sequences--such as a helicopter's convoy's delivering portable toilets."

Though Ed McMahon refers to the movie as a "semiclassic" in his biography, Rue McClanahan (who plays his wife) admits she did it just to fill a contractual obligation with NBC and said "it was about as funny as Mom and Me, MD", a reference to another television movie she did in 1979.

On its debut, the movie was the 14th most watched primetime show of the week with a 17.8/30 rating. The serious Holocaust drama Playing for Time, which won a number of Emmys, was the most watched program that week.

Writers Steve Hattman and Dave Hackel dreamed up the idea for the movie when they were stuck in an L.A. traffic jam. It appears the original title of the film was "Gridlock", but there is no evidence of it ever being released under that title. It was released on VHS in the United States in December 1987.

== Primary cast ==
Though the cast is large, the opening credits billed cast are listed in alphabetical order as follows:

- Desi Arnaz Jr. - Robbie Reinhardt
- John Beck - Buzz Gregory
- Noah Beery - Barney
- René Enríquez - Mayor Julio Escontrerez
- Shelley Fabares - Louise Gregory
- Phil Foster - Koppleman
- James Gregory - General Caruthers
- Lisa Hartman - Nikki
- Michael Lerner - Marv
- Rue McClanahan - Adele
- James McEachin - Speed-O
- Ed McMahon - Henry
- Al Molinaro - Sightseer
- Charles Napier - Sonny
- Christopher Norris - Linda Reinhardt (pregnant woman)
- Alan Sues - Dudley
- Vic Tayback - Floyd 'Snake' Kraslowski

Other actors appearing in the film include Lyle Waggoner, Abe Vigoda, Marcia Wallace, and Paul Willson; game show hosts Wink Martindale, Jack Clark, Art James, and Jim Perry; and Howard Hesseman (who was playing a DJ role on WKRP in Cincinnati at this time) as the voice of the radio announcer.
