= David Angell =

American screenwriter and television producer (1946–2001)

- Angell in 2000
- Born: April 10, 1946; Providence, Rhode Island, U.S.
- Died: September 11, 2001 (aged 55); North Tower, World Trade Center, New York City, U.S.
- Education: Providence College (BA)
- Occupations: Writer; producer
- Years active: 1977–2001
- Notable work: Wings; Frasier; Cheers
- Spouse: Lynn Edwards (m. 1971)
- Relatives: Kenneth Angell (brother)
- Awards: 8 Emmy Awards
- Military career
- Allegiance: United States
- Branch: United States Army
- Service years: 1971-1972

David Lawrence Angell (April 10, 1946 – September 11, 2001) was an American screenwriter and television producer, known for his work in sitcoms. He won multiple Emmy Awards as a Cheers writer and as the creator and executive producer of the sitcoms Wings and Frasier with Peter Casey and David Lee. Heading home from their vacation on Cape Cod, Angell and his wife, Lynn, were killed aboard American Airlines Flight 11, the first plane to hit the World Trade Center during the September 11 attacks.

== Early life ==
Angell was born in Providence, Rhode Island, to Henry and Mae (née Cooney) Angell. He received a bachelor's degree in English literature from Providence College. He married Lynn Edwards on August 14, 1971. Soon after Angell entered the U.S. Army upon graduation and served at the Pentagon until 1972. He then moved to Boston and worked as a methods analyst at an engineering company and later at an insurance firm in Rhode Island. His brother, Kenneth Angell, was a Roman Catholic prelate and Bishop of Burlington, Vermont.

== Career ==
Angell moved to Los Angeles in 1977. His first script was sold to the producers of the Annie Flynn series. Five years later, he sold his second script, for the sitcom Archie Bunker's Place. In 1983, he joined Cheers as a staff writer. In 1985, Angell joined forces with Peter Casey and David Lee as Cheers supervising producers/writers. The trio received 37 Emmy Award nominations and won 24 Emmy Awards, including the above-mentioned for Frasier. They also won an Outstanding Comedy Series Emmy for Cheers, in 1989, which Angell, Casey, Lee and the series' other producers shared, and an Outstanding Writing/Comedy Emmy for Cheers, which Angell received in 1984. After working together as producers on Cheers, Angell, Casey and Lee formed Grub Street Productions. In 1990, they created and executive-produced the comedy series Wings.

Writing credits
Series	Episode	Air date
Archie Bunker's Place	"Barney Gets Laid Off"	November 28, 1982
Archie Bunker's Place	"Relief Bartender"	January 23, 1983
Cheers	"Pick a Con... Any Con"	February 24, 1983
Cheers	"Someone Single, Someone Blue"	March 3, 1983
Cheers	"Old Flames"	November 17, 1983
Cheers	"They Called Me Mayday"	December 1, 1983
Cheers	"Snow Job"	February 9, 1984
Cheers	"Coach in Love: Part 1"	November 8, 1984
Cheers	"Coach in Love: Part 2"	November 15, 1984
Cheers	"Peterson Crusoe"	December 13, 1984
Cheers	"Love Thy Neighbor"	November 21, 1985
Cheers	"Dark Imaginings"	February 20, 1986
Cheers	"Strange Bedfellows: Part 1"	May 1, 1986
Cheers	"Strange Bedfellows: Part 2"	May 8, 1986
Cheers	"Strange Bedfellows: Part 3"	May 15, 1986
Cheers	"House of Horrors with Formal Dining and Used Brick"	October 30, 1986
Cheers	"Chambers vs. Malone"	January 8, 1987
Cheers	"The Crane Mutiny"	October 29, 1987
Cheers	"How to Recede in Business"	October 27, 1988
Cheers	"The Guy Can't Help It"	May 13, 1993
Condo	"Members Only"	June 9, 1983
Domestic Life	"Showdown at Walla Walla"	April 15, 1984
Wings	"Legacy"	April 19, 1990
Wings	"Return to Nantucket: Part 2"	May 10, 1990
Wings	"Sports and Leisure"	October 19, 1990
Wings	"Stew in a Stew"	January 23, 1992
Wings	"The Gift: Part 1"	February 11, 1993
Wings	"The Gift: Part 2"	February 18, 1993
Frasier	"The Good Son"	September 16, 1993
Frasier	"My Coffee with Niles"	May 19, 1994
Frasier	"And the Dish Ran Away with the Spoon"	October 24, 2000
Encore! Encore!	"Pilot"	September 22, 1998

== Death ==
Angell and his wife Lynn died in the September 11 attacks at the World Trade Center in Manhattan. They were among the passengers of American Airlines Flight 11, who were all killed when the plane struck the North Tower of the complex.

== Legacy ==
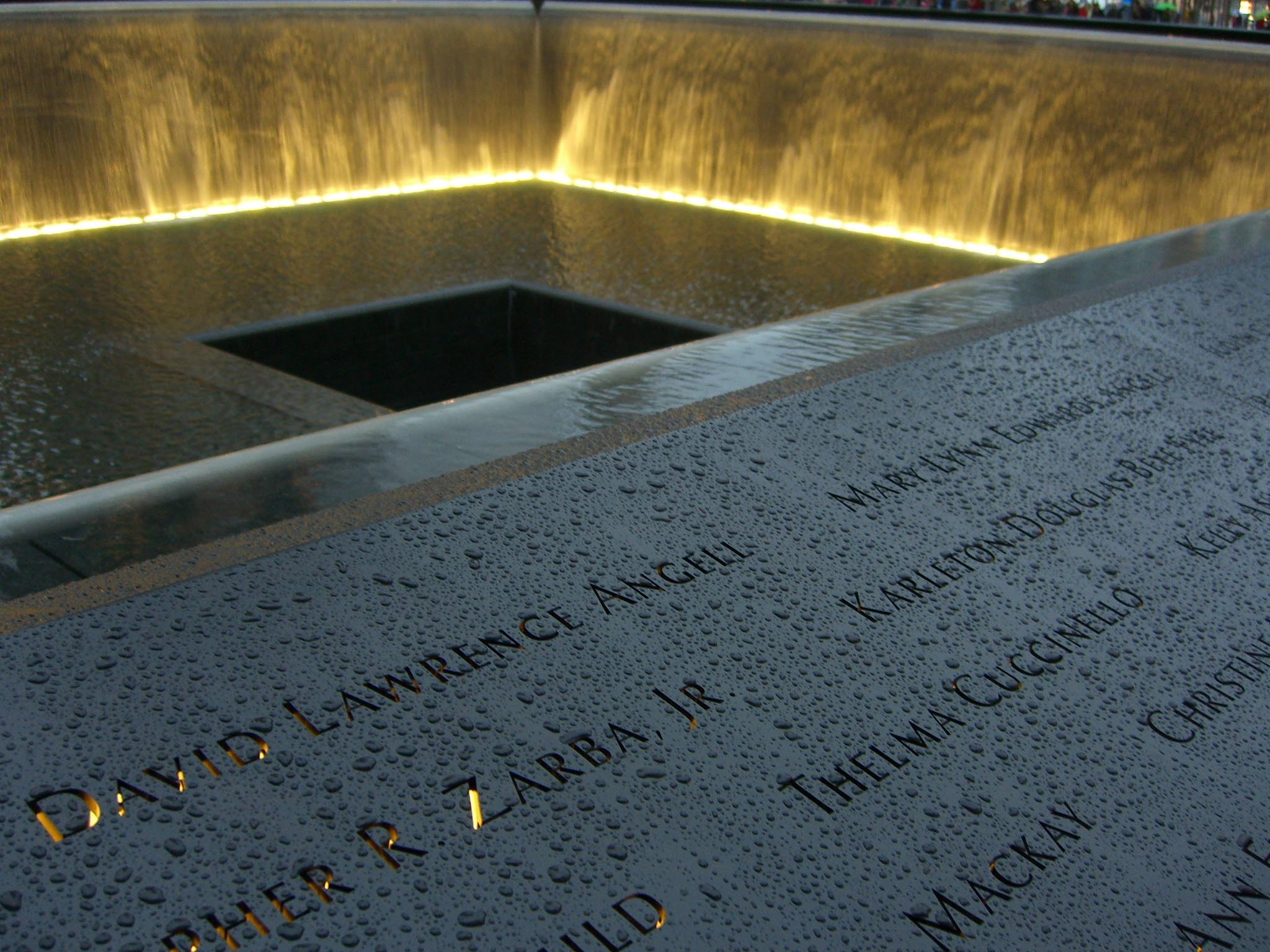
The names of David Angell and his wife are located on Panel N-1 of the National September 11 Memorial's North Pool, along with other passengers from Flight 11.

The American Screenwriters Association awards the annual David Angell Humanitarian Award to any individual in the entertainment industry who contributes to global well-being through donations of time, expertise or other support to improve the human condition.

In 2004, The Angell Foundation of Los Angeles, California, awarded Providence College a gift of $2 million for the Smith Center for the Arts.

The two-part episode of Frasier to air after the attacks, "Don Juan in Hell" airing on September 25, 2001, ended with the memorial tribute, "In loving memory of our friends Lynn and David Angell". In "Goodnight, Seattle", the series finale that aired May 13, 2004, Niles Crane and Daphne Moon's son was born, named David in tribute.

At the National September 11 Memorial, Angell and his wife are memorialized at the North Pool, on Panel N-1, along with other passengers from Flight 11.

Angell Hall on Enders Island, Connecticut, is named after David and Lynn Angell.
