= Wings (1990 TV series) =

American television sitcom (1990–1997)

- Genre: Sitcom
- Created by: David Angell; Peter Casey; David Lee
- Starring: Tim Daly; Steven Weber; Crystal Bernard; Thomas Haden Church; David Schramm; Rebecca Schull; Tony Shalhoub; Farrah Forke; Amy Yasbeck; Brian Haley
- Theme music composer: Franz Schubert
- Opening theme: Piano Sonata No. 20 in A major, D. 959, Rondo: Allegretto
- Composer: Antony Cooke
- Country of origin: United States
- Original language: English
- No. of seasons: 8
- No. of episodes: 172 (list of episodes)

Production
- Executive producers: David Angell; Peter Casey; David Lee; Ian Gurvitz; Mark Reisman; Howard Gewirtz; David Hackel
- Producer: James Tibmolap
- Camera setup: Multi-camera
- Running time: 22–23 minutes
- Production companies: Grub Street Productions; Paramount Network Television

Original release
- Network: NBC
- Release: April 19, 1990 – May 21, 1997

Related
- Cheers; The Tortellis; Frasier; Frasier (2023 TV series)

Wings is an American television sitcom that ran for eight seasons on NBC from April 19, 1990, to May 21, 1997, for a total of 172 episodes.

The show is set at the fictional "Tom Nevers Field" airport, a small two-airline airport in Nantucket, Massachusetts (not to be confused with the actual Nantucket Memorial Airport), where brothers and pilots Joe and Brian Hackett operate Sandpiper Air, a single-plane airline. The majority of the episodes are set in the airport.

Tim Daly and Steven Weber star as Joe and Brian. Crystal Bernard plays Helen, their friend since childhood and later Joe's love interest and wife, who runs the airport's lunch counter but dreams of becoming a concert cellist. David Schramm plays Roy Biggins, who runs a competing airline, Aeromass. Rebecca Schull plays Fay, Joe and Brian's employee at Sandpiper Air. Thomas Haden Church portrayed the mechanic Lowell in the first six seasons, Tony Shalhoub was taxi driver Antonio from season 3 onward, and Farrah Forke was Brian's love interest, Alex, during seasons 4 and 5. Amy Yasbeck played Helen's sister, Casey, from season 6 through the show's end in season 8. Brian Haley briefly played the mechanic Budd, Lowell's replacement, in season 7.

Serving as the second spin-off of the sitcom Cheers, Wings was created and produced by Cheers veterans David Angell, Peter Casey, and David Lee. The trio later created the sitcom Frasier, which was also a spin-off of Cheers. Wings exists in the same fictional universe as Cheers, and many characters from Cheers occasionally make special guest appearances on Wings. The series was produced by Grub Street Productions, in association with Paramount Network Television.

== Synopsis ==
Brothers Joe and Brian Hackett own Sandpiper Air, a small single-plane airline on Nantucket Island. Although both adept pilots who take their vocation seriously, Joe is type A and rigid, while Brian is a “free spirit” whose casual approach to life cost him a position with NASA in his youth. Regardless, he takes flying seriously, and is the only pilot Joe trusts.

Joe and Brian’s childhood friend, the beautiful Helen Chappel, runs the airport’s lunch counter. She has always been in love with elder brother Joe, while Brian has always harbored secret feelings for her. Helen’s refusal to date pilots (based on their perceived untrustworthiness), and Brian and Joe’s efforts to circumvent this restriction, are a common source of humor in early seasons. Helen's dream is to play the cello in an orchestra, and she attends auditions when not making sandwiches; Brian and Joe’s transport of Helen using the Sandpiper plane occasionally leads to misadventure. Midway through the series, Joe and Helen begin dating, with their on-again, off-again romance and eventual engagement serving as an ongoing source of storylines and conflict.

Fay Cochran, a sweet but scatterbrained widow, runs the Sandpiper ticket counter and is Joe’s best friend, often acting as the voice of reason when he comes into conflict with other characters. Lowell Mather is the dimwitted yet technically proficient airport mechanic, who maintains the planes for both Aeromass and Sandpiper while dealing with his chronically unfaithful wife, Bunny, who cares for the pair’s house boat. Bunny’s infidelities eventually lead to the pair’s divorce. Lowell leaves the island shortly thereafter, entering the witness protection program after he witnesses a Mafia assassination on the mainland and begins to fear for his safety. Following Lowell’s departure from the series, he is temporarily replaced by Bud, a paranoiac with PTSD whose extreme caution and tendency to overreact alienates him from the entire crew of both airlines.

Roy Biggins, the brothers' unscrupulous business rival, runs Aeromass, a larger airline in the same airport, and serves as either an antagonist or a source of comic relief. Despite Roy’s personal unpleasantness and lack of morals, he regularly participates in misadventures with the rest of the cast if there is some material gain to be had, or if he is simply lonely. Multiple episodes explore Roy’s complex inner life, including his insecurities over his weight, troubled relationship with his parents, and difficulty forming personal or romantic or relationships. Despite other characters’ overtures of friendship, Roy usually alienates them through his own greed or selfishness.

Beginning with Season 3, they are joined by an Italian immigrant, Antonio Scarpacci, who operates a taxi service and who is occasionally in danger of being deported. Later in the series, Helen's snobby older sister Casey moves to the island after losing her fortune in a divorce and becomes the unwitting object of Antonio's affections. The good-natured Antonio’s inability to reconcile American dating norms with those of his rural village in Italy is a regular source of humor. Casey later becomes romantically involved with, and moves in with, Brian.

== Cast and characters ==
| Actor | Character | Position | Seasons | | | | | | | |
| Actor | Character | Position | 1 | 2 | 3 | 4 | 5 | 6 | 7 | 8 |
|---|---|---|---|---|---|---|---|---|---|---|
| Tim Daly | Joe Hackett | Pilot; owner of Sandpiper Air | Main | Main | Main | Main | Main | Main | Main | Main |
| Steven Weber | Brian Hackett | Pilot | Main | Main | Main | Main | Main | Main | Main | Main |
| Crystal Bernard | Helen Chappel | Airport lunch counter operator | Main | Main | Main | Main | Main | Main | Main | Main |
| David Schramm | Roy Biggins | Owner of Aeromass; City councillor | Main | Main | Main | Main | Main | Main | Main | Main |
| Rebecca Schull | Fay Cochran | Ticket agent | Main | Main | Main | Main | Main | Main | Main | Main |
| Thomas Haden Church | Lowell Mather | Mechanic | Main | Main | Main | Main | Main | Main | Guest | |
| Tony Shalhoub | Antonio Scarpacci | Taxi driver | | Guest | Main | Main | Main | Main | Main | Main |
| Farrah Forke | Alex Lambert | Helicopter pilot | | | | Recurring | Main | Guest | | |
| Amy Yasbeck | Casey Chappel | Various | | | | | | Main | Main | Main |

=== Cast changes ===
Tim Daly, Steven Weber, Crystal Bernard, David Schramm, and Rebecca Schull starred in all eight seasons. With a few exceptions, the cast was mostly consistent for the show's run:

- Thomas Haden Church was a main cast member for the first six seasons. He left the show in spring 1995, at the end of Season 6, to star in the Fox sitcom Ned and Stacey. He later returned for a guest appearance in an episode of Season 7 to wrap up his storyline and was invited back for the finale at the end of Season 8, but declined, though he was in the audience during the taping.
- Tony Shalhoub joined the cast as a taxi driver in Season 3, having previously made a guest appearance as a waiter in a Season 2 episode. Shalhoub so impressed the producers with his one-shot appearance that he was signed as a main character for the rest of the show. References are made to him working as a waiter in New York City and elsewhere.
- Farrah Forke featured in Season 4 and became a main character in Season 5, returning briefly for a guest appearance the following season.
- Amy Yasbeck joined the cast in Season 6 and remained until the end of the show's run.
- After Thomas Haden Church's departure, Brian Haley briefly joined the cast as the new mechanic for a few episodes of Season 7 before the character was written out without explanation.

=== Main characters ===
==== Joe Hackett ====
Played by Tim Daly, Joseph Montgomery Hackett is a highly responsible, compulsively neat pilot who co-owns the one-plane airline Sandpiper Air on Nantucket Island with his brother Brian. Joe is usually the straight man and the nice guy. He dreamed of becoming a pilot as a child, and became the de facto patriarch of the Hackett family after their mother disappeared, which caused their father to go insane and become institutionalized.

Joe intended to launch Sandpiper Air with his fiancée Carol behind the ticket counter, but his brother Brian ran off with her prior to the start of the series, causing a falling out between the brothers. Joe is a big sports fan, supporting the Boston Red Sox, Boston Bruins, New England Patriots, and Boston Celtics. He grew up playing baseball and football and played on both varsity teams in high school. Joe graduated Boston College and says he pledged a fraternity, but never mentions which one. Joe eventually falls in love with Helen Chappel, his childhood friend.

==== Brian Hackett ====
Cast of Wings seasons 7–8 (l to r): Tony Shalhoub, Crystal Bernard, Timothy Daly, Steven Weber, Rebecca Schull, David Schramm, Amy Yasbeck

Played by Steven Weber, Brian Michael Hackett is the younger and more carefree of the brothers and co-owns Sandpiper Air with Joe. His irresponsibility is often a source of consternation for Joe. He had a "free ride" to Princeton and dropped out, was accepted into the Astronaut training program at NASA and was expelled because he took dates into the simulator, and lost other lucrative opportunities due to his chronic irresponsibility.

Ironically, when Brian attempts to act responsibly it causes problems for Joe; When Brian managed to hold down a job flying charter flights on the Caribbean island of Mustique, he was emboldened to seduce Carol to run off to Mustique with him, which caused Joe to cut Brian out of his life.

When Carol leaves Brian for another man and their father Donald Hackett dies, Brian returns to Nantucket, and Joe is eventually persuaded not only to allow him to move into his house, but also to give Brian a job at Sandpiper Air (after some posthumous support from the father). Soon they become partners in the airline. Brian ultimately becomes Joe's best friend. Brian is a shameless womanizer for most of the series, but has two significant relationships: the first with helicopter pilot Alex Lambert, and then with Casey Chappel Davenport, Helen's older sister.

While Wings was on the air, Weber reprised the role of Brian on an episode of Duckman titled "Role with It".

==== Helen Chappel ====
Played by Crystal Bernard, Helen is a petite blonde who speaks with a Texas drawl despite having lived on Nantucket for most of her life. It is explained that her family moved to the island from Texas when she was ten years old. Though Helen dreams of playing the cello in a large symphony orchestra, she runs the lunch counter in the airport terminal and never manages to get a music career off the ground until the final episode. Occasionally, Helen earns money teaching the cello.

A running gag related to her music is that bad luck follows her when she plays. Examples include: Helen having to join a string quartet of neurotic individuals as it is the only group at the time who accepts her; Helen being accepted by a state-run symphony, only to learn the state legislature eliminated the funding; the Boston Symphony Orchestra (BSO) appreciating a cassette of her cello playing, but losing the label and having no way to contact her; and when she finally gets a chance to play for the BSO, the plane crashes en route.

Helen battles a compulsive eating habit that caused her to be obese in her youth. Though successful at losing the weight sometime after Brian eloped with Carol, it is still a spectre in her life and a blight on her self-image. She tends to gain weight when Carol comes to town and makes Helen a mess. She has been a lifelong friend of both Hackett brothers and dreamed of marrying Joe from a young age. Helen marries Antonio to prevent him from being deported. Although Antonio wins the Green Card Lottery and agrees to end the marriage, when Helen tries to get a marriage license to marry Joe, she finds out she is still married to Antonio. Roy advises her to get a quick divorce in Mexico. At the sixth season finale, Helen is finally able to marry Joe.

The writers originally had a different character in mind, written for Peri Gilpin, who would have played a woman of Greek heritage. However Gilpin was unable to commit to the role, and the character of Helen was created for Bernard. Gilpin, however, did star on one episode of Wings in the third season, and was later cast as Roz Doyle on Frasier.

==== Fay Cochran ====
Played by Rebecca Schull, Fay is Joe's only other regular employee besides Brian (Kenny was an employee briefly in season 2). She is a retired flight attendant who handles the ticket counter, baggage check, and flight announcements for Sandpiper Air. She grew up in Syracuse, NY (next to a chop shop), and lived in Hawaii before moving to Nantucket. She is generally sweet and motherly, though slightly batty. She looks after the younger members of their circle as her children, although she can be sweetly manipulative. She came to work for Joe when he met her on a flight to Hawaii right after Carol left him for Brian.

Fay is thrice widowed; all three of her husbands were named George, and she jokes about a curse that if she marries a man named George, he will die prematurely. In one episode she almost marries a man named Lyle, only to learn that "Lyle" is only his middle name and his first name is George. Her full name is Fay Evelyn Schlob Dumbly DeVay Cochran.

Fay has a streak in which she has touched every First Lady of the United States since Eleanor Roosevelt.

==== Roy Biggins ====
Played by David Schramm, Roy Peterman Biggins is the owner of Aeromass, the only other airline on Nantucket and, with seven planes, a larger business than Sandpiper. Roy has been unable to break into the lucrative business of charter flights. He is also a member of the City Council of Nantucket. It is revealed that he started Aeromass with money inherited from an uncle. He usually addresses the other characters by their last names.

Generally competitive, arrogant, and unpleasant, Roy belittles Joe for having a small-time operation and mocks Joe's business skills. Despite this, Roy feels threatened by Joe's presence as a competitor and makes numerous attempts either to buy Sandpiper or put it out of business. Roy is generally the rival of the group.

Roy was married to a woman named Sylvia, played by Concetta Tomei. For several years he claims that she had died, but it is later revealed that she left him and is now married to a wealthy plastic surgeon and living in Boston. When she shows up on the island seeking to hook up with Roy, he's initially thrilled until he realizes that she still loathes him and only wants to sleep with him to get revenge on her cheating husband; he's willing to go through with it because he likes sex, but after Brian surprisingly tells Roy he doesn't deserve to be treated that way, Roy gets his own revenge by showing up for the rendezvous (where Sylvia both confirms she's out for revenge and that her husband needs to be thoroughly humiliated and nothing could do that more effectively than cuckolding him with ROY) and then telling Sylvia that he's sorry—he's just there to end things for good because "I'm such a tease!" The couple has one son, R.J. (Roy Junior), who is gay. It takes a while for Roy to support him and become proud of him.

Roy is the most dishonest businessman on the island. Examples include forcing a customer who has just ordered a large meal from Helen to board the plane immediately, and then stealing both the meal and the money the customer leaves for Helen. He also establishes false charities including one for his "late wife" and uses the proceeds for fly-fishing trips or to subscribe to the Playboy Channel.

Roy has an autographed picture of Richard Nixon in his office, and was once arrested for trying to force his way aboard Air Force One to have a picture taken of himself shaking hands with President George H. W. Bush.

Also in his office he has a poster of a woman wearing a thong bikini riding on a unicycle. He comments, "If that was Paris and she was holding a loaf of bread, they'd call it art."

While normally conniving and arrogant, Roy does have a sense of fun: since his birthday is February 29, 1948, a leap year, he celebrates it only once every four years as if he were only a quarter of his real age. He drives a purple El Camino, on which he claims he can disconnect the brake lights in order to engage in insurance fraud by being intentionally rear-ended by people driving luxury cars.

Despite his sleazy and conniving nature, Roy does have a more generous side: when Helen finds out that she was not properly divorced from her sham marriage to Antonio, Roy helps her concoct an elaborate plan to send Joe away for a weekend of fly fishing in Maine while she, Brian and Antonio fly to Tampico, Mexico to get a "quickie" divorce from a Señor Pepe. Roy does not try to blackmail Helen or demand money, simply asking Helen to deliver a message to Señor Pepe, "The donkey has died."

==== Lowell Mather ====
(Season 1–6, Guest in Season 7) Played by Thomas Haden Church, Lowell is a dim-witted mechanic/handyman who works at the airport. He is a "free agent" of sorts, on the payroll of both Sandpiper and its rival airline Aeromass, as well as anyone else willing to pay him for repairs. He claims that while he is not an orphan, his brother is. Lowell is friendly with all the staff; he has known Brian, Joe and Helen since they were kids. He was married to a woman named Bunny with whom he had several children, but they divorced when Lowell learned that Bunny was sleeping around.

After Brian sinks the houseboat Lowell lives on, Lowell lives with Joe and Brian for a time, where he reveals a surprising talent for cooking. After about a year, however, his eccentricities became unbearable to the Hacketts, and they kick him out to find his own place, which coincides with the conclusion of the insurance investigation, the payout allowing Lowell to buy himself a house on land.

Eventually, Lowell is forced to leave Nantucket and enter the Witness Protection Program after witnessing a mob hit. Although it is hard for him to leave the people he has known all his life, Lowell decides he would rather go into hiding than let a guilty man go free to possibly kill again.

Lowell usually wears a grease-stained orange ball cap, although he is sometimes seen without it at times when it would be rude to wear hats indoors. During a later season, Lowell's orange hat goes missing and he wears a red hat in its place from then on. When Lowell leaves Nantucket, he gives his red hat to Joe and Brian to remember him by; the brothers nail it to the hangar wall in memoriam, beside a sign advising others not to remove it.

==== Antonio Scarpacci ====
(Guest in Season 2, Main Season 3–8) Played by Tony Shalhoub, Antonio V. Scarpacci is an Italian immigrant from Apecchio (in the Central Italian region of Marche), who owns and operates a taxi service to and from the airport. Antonio is mild-mannered, deferential, and hopelessly romantic; he falls head-over-heels for Helen's older sister Casey when she returns to Nantucket, although his feelings are not reciprocated. Antonio was originally a waiter, and made a guest appearance in the second season in this role before becoming an official cast member in the third season (by which time he had changed professions). Helen marries him to save him from deportation. The marriage lasts for three years (unbeknownst to either one of them) long after Antonio has his green card, due to an error on Helen's part. He is a big fan of the Mary Pat Lee Show. Antonio is also friends with Joe, Helen, Brian, Lowell and Faye. He is sometimes annoyed and bullied by Roy.

After the series ended, Wings was referenced in the season one finale of Shalhoub's later series Monk, where Shalhoub's character Adrian Monk and his assistant Sharona Fleming (Bitty Schram) run into Tim Daly (playing himself), and Sharona says he was the star of Wings. Monk responds "I've never seen it, but I heard it was good," in an obvious in-joke.

==== Alex Lambert ====
(Season 4–5, Guest in Season 6) Played by Farrah Forke, Alex is a helicopter pilot who moves to Nantucket to start a helicopter tour business. She has previously flown U.S. Army Apache helicopters in Desert Storm. It is discovered that she posed for Playboy. Though she initially rebuffs the amorous attentions of both Hackett brothers, she eventually falls for Brian's boyish charms. She and Brian live together briefly, but after Brian spends a wild night in New York with Joe and an old friend, Alex throws him out of the apartment and leaves Nantucket for good. She returns a season later to resolve some of the bitterness in their breakup; she and Brian briefly get back together before they both decide it is best to go their separate ways.

==== Casey Chappel ====
(Season 6–8) Played by Amy Yasbeck, Cassandra "Casey" (Chappel) Davenport is Helen's older sister. She returns to Nantucket after being abandoned by her husband, Stuart Davenport (played by John Ritter, who was Yasbeck's real life partner and later husband), but despite having grown up there she has difficulty adjusting her upper crust tastes and sensibilities to a working class life on the small island. Antonio falls madly in love with Casey, but she takes little notice of him. Unlike Helen, Casey dropped her Southern accent when she moved to Nantucket. She spends much of season six unemployed and mooching off Helen, until she starts working for Nantucket's tourism organization in season seven.

After she and Brian spend the better part of a season sniping at each other, they have sex the night before Joe and Helen's wedding. Afterward, they are unable to stay away from each other and have a passionate affair; while Joe and Helen are on their honeymoon, Casey's bra lands on the hearth of the lit fireplace and leads to Helen's house burning down. Casey's relationship with Brian cools after that, but they maintain a friendship. When she first appears in the show, Casey goes by her married name of Davenport, but after she and Stuart divorce at the end of season seven, she reverts to Chappel.

==== Budd Bronski ====
(Season 7) Played by Brian Haley, Budd is a retired US Marine who is hired to replace Lowell. Budd is Lowell's equal as a skilled mechanic and earnest worker, but also as a quirky character. He is jumpy and insecure, and is haunted by an incident in his past when an aircraft he worked on crashed, causing him to face a court martial. Although the military cleared him of charges, Budd continues to blame himself for the incident until Brian convinces him to let it go. Occasionally, Budd astonishes everyone with magic tricks, but otherwise he has difficulty interacting with others. After being introduced early in the seventh season, Budd disappears toward the end of the season and is never mentioned again.

=== Recurring characters and notable guest stars ===
Carlton Blanchard: played by William Hickey, Carlton is an older man with a high-pitched nasal voice whose outwardly meek yet privately demanding behavior causes everyone who meets him to shudder at his approach. He is known to ask bizarre questions such as "If you were to carpet Florida, how long would it take to vacuum it?" and "If a monkey were to bite you, what kind of drugs do you suppose they'd give you?" He annoys Joe, Brian, Lowell and Antonio when he demands to be flown to Las Cruces, New Mexico, far beyond the scope of Sandpiper's routes. However, the brothers reluctantly agree as Carlton won a charity contest sponsored by Sandpiper and the rules did say the winner "will be flown anywhere". In another episode, he tricks Helen into throwing him a birthday party and then falls down her stairs to force her to take care of him for a week. Though none of the regulars like Carlton, he is especially disliked by Antonio, a situation made worse when Carlton repeatedly calls him "Angelo". Hickey's casting was a nod to the 1927 film Wings, Hickey being born in same year as its debut and the name "Carlton Blanchard" being one of the film's characters, played by a different actor named William Hickey.

Lewis Blanchard: played by Gilbert Gottfried, he is Carlton's equally irritating nephew. He is very rude and abrasive and makes only the slightest of attempts to hide his wish for Carlton to die so he can inherit his money. He seems to have crushes on Casey, Helen, and Alex, who are all repulsed by his lewd remarks.

Donald Hackett: played by Don Murray, Joe and Brian's deceased father took it hard when his wife, the boys' mother, walked out on the family. He was committed to a mental institution and died just prior to the beginning of the series.

He has a good sense of humor, and in the series premiere his will was required to be read to Brian and Joe together, forcing them to reunite after their six-year estrangement. He willed them a key which opened up a lockbox to another key, then another, which had Joe and Brian go to Boston then back to Nantucket airport where they ended up finding a suitcase full of spring snakes and a photograph of them as children, encouraging them always to value their kinship.

After Brian and Casey burn down Joe's house, Joe is fed up with Brian's string of irresponsible behavior and fires him from Sandpiper and orders him never to speak to him again. The ghost of their father appears and uses reverse psychology to convince Joe to make peace with Brian.

Lou: played by Phil Leeds, Lou is a feisty old man who is introduced in Season Seven's "The Lyin' King". In that episode, Joe, in order to assuage his guilt over a plan to go to a strip club, volunteers at the senior citizens' home, where he is assigned to spend time with Lou. After spending a moment complaining about how lousy nursing home life is, Lou manages to guilt trip Joe into taking him to the strip club. Though Joe is somewhat tolerant of Lou, Brian is decidedly less so, referring to him derisively as "Yoda" (due to Lou's shriveled physical appearance). Lou makes it clear he does not care for Brian either. Lou is also prone to talking about a rift he had in the past with his brother Harry, prompting his catchphrase, "He screwed me blue!" Lou was originally intended as a one-shot appearance, but proved so popular that he was brought back in the show's final season, along with his brother Harry, played by Abe Vigoda.

Davis Lynch: played by Mark Harelik, Davis is a businessman Joe flies to Nantucket to invest in the airline. Though he rejects Joe's offer (and ends up investing in Roy's airline), he ends up dating Helen and eventually proposes to her. Helen accepts, but ends up leaving him for Joe. Toward the end of the series, Helen reveals she never broke off the engagement. She had figured he was gone after he was skirted off to Burma in the wake of a coup d'etat to salvage major investments he had in the company. He was then placed under house arrest by the military junta. Upon his release, Davis returns to see Helen, but while she is trying to work up the courage to tell him she has married someone else, Davis announces that he will be unable to marry her, having fallen in love with a woman who worked for the State Department and risked her life to secure his release.

Roy Biggins, Jr. (a.k.a. R.J.): played by Abraham Benrubi, Roy's only son is secretly gay. Roy trained R.J. how to do "guy stuff" such as playing football. The first time R.J. is shown is when he is a high school student taking cello lessons from Helen as an extracurricular activity. R.J. reveals to everyone he is a homosexual. Roy does not take this news well and challenges him to a game of one-on-one basketball on the condition that if R.J. wins he is "allowed" to be gay, but if Roy wins R.J. is not. R.J. wins game after game against Roy, but Roy refuses to give up.

R.J. returns much later in the series after being estranged from Roy for a long time. He has since graduated from law school and plans to take the Massachusetts Bar Exam. Roy is proud of R.J. and his accomplishments, but only so long as R.J.'s homosexuality is not discussed. The issue finally comes to a head at Roy's birthday party, when he accuses R.J. of throwing his lifestyle in his face and ruining his party by bringing his boyfriend Luke (Tim Bagley). After R.J. and Luke walk out, Helen talks to Roy, reminding him that while he does not have to like it, he does have to accept it, because the alternative is accepting that it may be another six years, or longer, before he sees R.J. again. Roy catches up with R.J. just as he and Luke are boarding a flight and fumbles an apology. R.J. loses patience, and points out that Roy cannot even say the word "gay." Desperate to stop R.J. from walking out of his life forever, Roy finally acknowledges it, and says that he wants to understand it. The two men hug.

Gail Scott: played by Gretchen German, she is Joe's girlfriend during the first part of Season Three. They begin dating while Helen is in New York. When Joe persuades Helen to move back to Nantucket because she is unhappy in New York, he does not tell her about his relationship with Gail because of his worry that it will prevent Helen from moving back to Nantucket.

Helen, convinced that she and Joe will pick up right where they left off, does come back, but soon discovers the truth about Joe and Gail. Believing that Joe intended to hurt her by not disclosing his relationship with Gail, Helen drives her jeep through Joe and Brian's office.

Gail is in three episodes, but is mentioned in several others, including phone conversations. She is a journalist who constantly travels. She and Helen become friends briefly, but Gail leaves Joe when she catches Joe and Helen kissing in his kitchen.

Sandy Cooper: played by Valerie Mahaffey, Sandy is a friend of Joe, Brian, and Helen from high school. She has an obsessive crush on Joe, but he is unable to convince anyone else of this because she acts normal except when she is alone with Joe, who gives her the nickname "Psycho Sandy". She appears on Nantucket occasionally and carefully plans her fantasy life with "Joey Bear" at moments when the two of them are alone. Her fantasies include a re-enacted high school prom in the basement of her old house, the couple's wedding and honeymoon in Helen's living room, and the birth of their first child in Joe's therapist's office. In one episode, Sandy is shown to be dating Brian, but the relationship is never pursued by the show's writers.

Kenny McElvey: played by Michael Manasseri, Kenny is an 18-year-old who becomes Sandpiper's backup pilot during a second season story arc where Joe is grounded for hypertension. The comedic focus of the character is his youth and relative inexperience, but he is the most qualified of the small pool of applicants to be Joe's replacement. Kenny leaves Sandpiper after Joe is cleared to fly. One episode shows Kenny also working at a fast food joint to supplement his meager income from Sandpiper.

Bunny Mather: played by Laura Innes, Lowell's wife flirts with nearly every man she encounters, and has sex with many of them. At one point she pursues Joe and Brian – her fantasy is to sleep with two co-workers. She once sleeps with Antonio, causing he and Lowell to come to blows. Lowell separates from her early in the series, and divorces her when he learns of her affairs. Despite their issues, Lowell and Bunny sleep together the very night they get divorced.

Sylvia: played by Concetta Tomei, Roy's ex-wife who divorced him and married a plastic surgeon. Roy initially tells people that she is dead, but after being caught in this lie, he goes to see her, only to find out that she has a new husband and a new life. She returns to the island in season 5 to sleep with Roy in an attempt to get back at her current husband for having an affair. Roy finds out and decides not to go through with it.

Mary Pat Lee: played by Caroline Aaron, she is a dishonest, bullying Boston talk show host who tricks Brian onto her show in season 6 to meet up with his ex-girlfriend Alex. She returns two seasons later as Roy's new girlfriend, though Roy dumps her when she uses their relationship to get Joe and Helen on her show to ambush them about a momentary slump in their sex life. Antonio is one of her biggest fans. Her budding relationship with Roy causes Antonio to mutter, "But... she's Mary Pat Lee... and he's... Roy." She is never seen again after Roy dumps her. She seems to be a parody of both Kathie Lee Gifford and Geraldo Rivera, with all the traits people hate about the two.

Edgar Clayton: played by Mitchell Ryan, he is a wealthy industrialist who buys Sandpiper from Joe and Brian to keep it from going under. He installs his son Cord as the new president only to see Cord fail miserably. He also fires his uncle Mike in front of his board of directors and has been known to give terminated employees "The Big Ugly". He is part of a three-part story arc, "Wingless", during the show's final season. Though he is identified in the closing credits as Jonathan Clayton, his name in dialogue is said to be Edgar Clayton.

Eleanor "Bluto" Biggins: played by Rose Marie, Roy's eccentric mother who lives in a nursing home. She is a meddlesome, domineering nag and Roy feels threatened by her. Joe, however, stands up to her and calls her a "Miserable Old Gargoyle". Eleanor is also a heavy drinker and Roy once says she has to be "cut off after six boilermakers." She is frequently mentioned, but is not seen until the final season.

Walter: played by Ralph Bruneau, he is an air traffic controller. Though he envisions himself as cool and collected he is generally hyperactive and easily distracted. He acts overly friendly toward both Joe and Brian, both of whom find him highly irritating. In season 4, Walter gets married; though he does not appear on-screen after that, he continues to be mentioned frequently. He takes a temporary leave of absence in Season 6 to have eye surgery to correct a double vision problem. In the final episode, he is said to be cheating on his wife.

Matt Sargent: played by Craig Bierko, is an actor hired by Brian to date Helen in an attempt to force her to break her "no dating pilots" rule.

Dee Dee Chapel: played by Debbie Reynolds, is Helen's mother who is known for her caring demeanor and culinary skill. Throughout the series it is often mentioned that she favors Helen's sister Casey.

Tracy Hayes: played by Carol Alt, is a former Nantucket local that became an exotic dancer to save money to go to law school. Joe and Brian concoct an elaborate scheme to go see her last performance.

Coach Snyder: played by Brian Doyle-Murray, is Joe & Brian's former High School coach. He is known for sharing unsolicited stories about his health as well as his harsh, demanding demeanor.

Dr. Grayson: played by George Plimpton is a local psychiatrist who treats Brian after his difficult breakup with Alex. He later gives Joe and Helen some impromptu pre-marital counseling. Later in the series, his son takes over the practice and reveals that Dr. Grayson left his wife and ran off with a patient.

Ty Warner: played by Matthew Fox, is a local student who breaks Joe's long standing high school baseball record despite Joe's attempts to thwart the effort. The appearance was Fox's television acting debut.

Mimsy Borogroves: played by Tyne Daly, is a wealthy woman who comes to Nantucket to buy property. Most of the cast fall all over themselves at the possibility of getting a piece of Mimsy's fortune in an effort to further their own interests. Particularly Brian, who briefly takes Mimsy as a lover. Tyne Daly is Tim Daly's real-life sister. This episode was the first time the siblings co-starred in a production. Tyne was nominated for an "Outstanding Lead Actress in a Comedy Series" Emmy for her performance.

Rebecca Burton: played by Ashley Johnson, is a tween whom Brian becomes smitten with after reading a series of love letters she wrote to a previous tenant of his house. Unaware of her age, he becomes obsessed with meeting her.

Stuart Davenport: played by John Ritter, is Casey's estranged husband. He left her unexpectedly and took all of their money which is what led Casey to return to Nantucket. He is mentioned throughout Casey's tenure on the series but only appears in a single episode during the final season. Ritter was Yasbeck's real life husband as well.

Dani: Played by Jenny McCarthy, is a ditzy, yet memorable character who briefly dates Brian. She annoyingly calls him "Bri-Bri" and loudly sings incorrect song lyrics while obsessing over restaurant breadsticks.

Mark: played by John Hawkes, is the waiter at the Crab House Restaurant. He becomes infatuated with Helen, who later pushes him toward Alex.

Marty: played by Scott Grimes, is an Aeromass intern whom Roy forces to do unpleasant personal tasks and errands. He is doing so for high school credit so that he can graduate on time. Fay inadvertently gets Marty fired after insisting that Roy needs to start treating him with more dignity.

Cameos: Other notable cameos in the series include appearances by Ray Charles, Clint Black, Dan Castellaneta, Oliver North, Ellen Albertini Dow, Jonathan Frakes, Megan Mullally, George Kennedy, Maury Povich, Charles Rocket, Peggy Lipton, Soupy Sales, Robert Culp, Peter Tork, Jay Leno, Steve Young, Shannon Tweed, David Ogden Stiers, Christine Cavanaugh, several stars and characters from Cheers and Frasier (see below) and more.

== Locale ==
The series takes place primarily at the fictional Nantucket airport Tom Nevers Field. Until 1976, the real-life island was the site of the United States Navy's Tom Nevers Naval Facility, later the home of the Nantucket Hunting Association. The Club Car (a real restaurant on Nantucket) is also often featured on the show.

The airplane for the show was a 1981 Cessna 402C, one of which was C/N 402C0507, N121PB, owned and operated by Express Air, owned and operated by Mike Josefek and Richard Sevigny. The pilot during the filming was Austin Carey. The aircraft was eventually sold to Cape Air where it flew until December 2023, when it was scrapped for parts. In the pilot episode (as well as a few other episodes) the airplane fuselage shown in the hangar was a Cessna 411 C/N 4110069, N121PP (which was destroyed).

== British pilot (1996) ==
A pilot for a British remake also called Wings was filmed in 1996. It was commissioned by Channel 3 North East and Yorkshire Television. The title of the episode is "The Legacy" (similar to the original show's pilot episode being called "Legacy"). Much of the dialogue is lifted word-for-word from the original pilot episode (with some elements also taken directly from the original's Season 2 premiere episode "The Puppetmaster", written by Philip LaZebnik), as are many of the character names, the location now moving to Jersey in the Channel Islands. Even the look of the set is almost identical to the original series. Sandpiper Air retains its name though Roy's competitor airline, Aeromass, has been changed to Goldhawk Air. Very little is known about this attempt at the remake. Seemingly only one episode was filmed and likely aired on November 19, 1996. It was directed by Roy Gould, produced by Andrew Benson, and scripted by all of the original creators—David Angell, Peter Casey, David Lee (or because their original pilot script was used), who are also credited as creators of the remake—and starred Tony Gardner and Jonathan Cake as brothers Michael and Steve Hackett (formerly Joe and Brian Hackett in the original), with Una Stubbs portraying Fay and Debra Beaumont as Helen Chappel. The character of Roy also appeared, played by Tim Wylton, as did Lowell, now renamed Noel and played by Bob Mason. Jason Hall was credited as Passenger and Anthony Schaeffer as Dispatcher. Some limited footage (a handful of clips totalling less than two minutes) surfaced online. With very little known and scant existing footage, this could be an example of a lost television broadcast.

== Cheers and Frasier tie-ins ==
Although not a spin-off, Wings takes place in the same universe as Cheers, and by extension, its spin-off Frasier. Several episodes had tie-ins with Cheers; Kelsey Grammer (who was nominated for an Emmy for his guest appearance), Bebe Neuwirth, George Wendt, John Ratzenberger, and Kirstie Alley all appeared on Wings playing their Cheers characters.

- Cliff Clavin and Norm Peterson visit Nantucket in the season two episode "The Story of Joe". Their goal is ostensibly to go fishing, but the two never seem to get any farther than the island's drinking establishments.
- Frasier and Lilith Crane were the focus of the season three episode "Planes, Trains, & Visiting Cranes." In the episode, Frasier and a skeptical Lilith come to Nantucket to put on a motivational seminar, but run into opposition from Helen Chappel, a dissatisfied former customer of Frasier's program. In the Cheers episode "License to Hill", which aired the same night as that particular Wings episode, Frasier even mentions that he and Lilith are going to Nantucket, foreshadowing their crossover appearance.
- Rebecca Howe has a cameo appearance in the season four episode "I Love Brian", whose plot revolves around Brian's attempt to infiltrate a post-concert party in Clint Black's hotel room. As Rebecca is seen being asked to leave by Black's bouncer, she begs Black to come to the bar in Boston where she works so she can prove to the others there that she knows him. Black responds, "Maybe next year," causing Rebecca to exclaim right before she is kicked out of the party, "But none of you know where we're going to be next year!", a reference to Cheers being in its final season on television.

In addition, Peri Gilpin—who had also appeared in Cheers and was later known for playing Roz in Frasier—was originally up for the role of Helen Chappel and also appeared in the Wings Season 3 episode "Four Dates That Will Live in Infamy" playing a different character, while her character on Frasier, Roz Doyle, is named as a tribute to one of Wings's producers, who died from breast cancer in 1991.

Rebecca Schull and Tony Shalhoub both guest-starred on episodes of Frasier as different characters (Shalhoub in the Season 3 episode "The Focus Group" and Schull in the Season 7 episode "RDWRER"). In the Season 9 episode "Bla-Z-Boy" Niles (David Hyde Pierce) plays the Wings theme song (Schubert's Piano sonata No. 20 in A Major, D. 959, IV. Rondo. Allegretto.).

Also, several of the same extras and actors in smaller supporting parts appear across all three shows, so it is not unusual to spot familiar faces in the airport in Wings, the bar in Cheers, and sometimes on Frasier as well.

== Episodes ==
| Season | Episodes | Originally released | | Rank | Rating | Ref. |
| Season | Episodes | First released | Last released | Rank | Rating | Ref. |
|---|---|---|---|---|---|---|
| 1 | 6 | April 19, 1990 | May 24, 1990 | —N/a | —N/a | —N/a |
| 2 | 22 | September 28, 1990 | March 28, 1991 | 42 | 12.2 (Note: Tied with The NBC Tuesday Night Movie.) | |
| 3 | 22 | September 19, 1991 | May 7, 1992 | 18 | 15.1 | |
| 4 | 22 | September 24, 1992 | May 13, 1993 | 30 | 13.0 | |
| 5 | 24 | September 16, 1993 | May 12, 1994 | 18 | 14.1 (Note: Tied with NYPD Blue.) | |
| 6 | 26 | September 20, 1994 | May 23, 1995 | 30 | 11.9 | |
| 7 | 26 | September 19, 1995 | May 23, 1996 | 35 | 11.0 | |
| 8 | 24 | September 18, 1996 | May 21, 1997 | 76 | 7.6 (Note: Tied with Almost Perfect, Chicago Sons, and Temporarily Yours.) | |

== Broadcast history ==
In Italy, the series aired on Rete 4 in 1995.

In the United Kingdom, the series aired on Sky One and Paramount Comedy Channel from 1991 to 1997.

TVNZ aired the show in New Zealand on Channel 2 throughout the 1990s, usually immediately after Cheers.

Reruns of the show have previously aired on the USA Network, Nick at Nite and TV Land. The show can currently be seen on Antenna TV weeknights at 1:00 & 1:30 a.m. EST, and on the spinoff subchannel Rewind TV weeknights at 5:00 & 5:30 p.m. EST and Sundays from 12:00 a.m.–2:00 p.m. EST.

It has also been available on several other services, including CBS All Access (now Paramount+), Hulu Plus, Netflix (DVD only), the now defunct Comedy Gold, and on a Wings channel on Pluto TV, which also has the series on-demand.

== Awards and nominations ==
| Year | Award | Category | Recipient | Result |
|---|---|---|---|---|
| 1992 | Primetime Emmy Awards | Outstanding Guest Actor in a Comedy Series | Kelsey Grammer as Dr. Frasier Crane in "Planes, Trains and Visiting Cranes"† | Nominated |
| 1992 | Primetime Emmy Awards | Outstanding Guest Actress in a Comedy Series | Tyne Daly as Mimsy Borogroves in "My Brother's Keeper"† | Nominated |
| 1992 | BMI Film & TV Awards | BMI TV Music Award | Bruce Miller | Won |
| 1994 | BMI Film & TV Awards | BMI TV Music Award | Bruce Miller | Won |
| 1995 | American Cinema Editors | Best Edited Half-Hour Series for Television | Darryl Bates | Nominated |
| 1996 | Primetime Emmy Award | Outstanding Makeup for a Series | Tommy Cole and Ken Wensevic for "Death Becomes Him" | Nominated |
| 1997 | GLAAD Media Award | Outstanding Individual Episode | "Sons and Lovers" | Nominated |
| 2005 | TV Land Award | Favorite Airborne Character(s) | Tim Daly, Steven Weber | Won |
(Source: IMDb.com)

† Nominated for guest performance. A rule change, instituted for the 1992 year only, stated that regular and guest performers would compete in the same category.

== Home media ==
Paramount Home Entertainment and CBS DVD have released the entire series on DVD in Region 1.

On September 6, 2013, it was announced that Mill Creek Entertainment had acquired the rights to the series. They have subsequently re-released the first four seasons.

On July 3, 2014, it was announced that Mill Creek Entertainment would release a complete series set on DVD on November 11, 2014.

| DVD name | No. of episodes | Release date |
|---|---|---|
| The Complete First and Second Seasons | 28 | May 23, 2006; October 1, 2013 (re-release) |
| The Complete Third Season | 22 | October 24, 2006; January 21, 2014 (re-release) |
| The Complete Fourth Season | 22 | May 15, 2007; January 21, 2014 (re-release) |
| The Complete Fifth Season | 24 | November 6, 2007 |
| The Complete Sixth Season | 26 | March 25, 2008 |
| The Complete Seventh Season | 26 | September 9, 2008 |
| The Complete Eighth and Final Season | 24 | April 14, 2009 |
| The Complete Series | 172 | November 11, 2014 |

== Music, opening sequence and closing credits ==
The theme was a shortened version of the final movement from Franz Schubert's Piano Sonata No. 20 in A major, D. 959. Schubert received screen credit as the theme composer in every episode.

The opening theme heard during the first two and a half seasons was a fairly straightforward arrangement of piano and strings. It starts with a shot of Brant Point Lighthouse with seagulls crying in the background. The title card is shown, then the cast members' names as the plane flies over various places and finally into Nantucket Memorial Airport. The Nantucket Airport control tower is seen with a reflection of the plane landing in the window with the show creators' names onscreen. The slow opening theme was dropped in January 1992 as episodes began using a cold open, with simply the title card and the cast members and creators. In the season 4 finale the cold open was brusquely interrupted to show the plane caught in a violent thunderstorm instead of the usual clear skies.

The closing sequence used in seasons 1–5 was accompanied by the plane flying over Nantucket Sound in a sunrise setting. A jazzed-up version of the theme was heard during the closing credits for the first two seasons, then a more up-tempo version with a piano lead from season 3 onward. The closing credits were changed in season 6 with the tag scene accompanied by the closing credits (for NBC's original airings, the generic credits were used when NBC started doing this in the 1994–1995 season as well), though some episodes from seasons 6–8, including the series finale, used the standard closing sequence from seasons 1–5 (but with a slightly different font).

== See also ==
- Cape Air
- Nantucket Airlines
