= Maggie Blanc =

American television line producer

- Other name: Maggie Randell-Blanc
- Occupation: Television producer

Maggie Blanc (formerly Maggie Randell) is an American television line producer of British descent.

== Career ==
Blanc produced the situation comedies Frasier (NBC) from 1993 to 2004 and Back to You (Fox) from 2007 to 2008. In 2009, Blanc produced the pilot episode of the NBC sitcom 100 Questions, and the entire run of episodes of the short-lived ABC series Hank.

== Awards ==
Blanc won five Primetime Emmy Awards for Outstanding Comedy Series for Frasier from 1994 to 1998. She was also nominated three additional times from Frasier from 1999 to 2001.
