= Grub Street Productions =

Former American television production company

- Industry: Television production
- Founded: March 2, 1989; 37 years ago
- Founders: David Angell; Peter Casey; David Lee
- Defunct: May 13, 2004; 22 years ago
- Fate: Dissolved
- Headquarters: United States

Grub Street Productions was an American production company founded in 1989 by three writers and producers: David Angell, Peter Casey and David Lee - who met while working on Cheers and left that show to form it. It was affiliated with Paramount Television (now CBS Television Studios).

The company created the television sitcom Frasier, which aired on NBC for eleven seasons from 1993 to 2004, totaling 264 episodes and won many Emmy awards, and the series Wings, which likewise aired on NBC, running for eight seasons and 172 episodes from 1990 to 1997. Additionally, the sitcoms The Pursuit of Happiness and Encore! Encore! were also produced by the company.

== Formation ==
David Angell, Peter Casey, and David Lee met on Cheers and left that series during its seventh season, on March 2, 1989, to form the upcoming production company, which became Grub Street Productions. While they were writing for Cheers, they knew they would want to continue working together once it ended. Casey won an Emmy in 1989, which helped when it came time to form his own production company with his writing partners. It was named after a famous street in London, Grub Street, which became a metaphor for the commercial production of printed matter, and a world or class of impoverished journalists and writers or literary hacks.

== Production ==
The Advocate called the production company "hugely successful" and the LA Times described them as a "sitcom factory". Warren Littlefield, president of NBC Entertainment, was quoted as saying: “If they come to us with a show, we want it. When you have people with their track record, you have to believe in them and let them take chances.” At one point, NBC had three Grub Street shows on the air at the same time.

=== Wings ===
Wings became their first produced show, first hitting the air in 1990. It would run for eight seasons up to 1997 and was considered a success, though never quite as high-profile as Cheers or Frasier.

=== Frasier ===
Kelsey Grammer guest-starred on an episode of Wings in 1992 (for which he was nominated for an Emmy) and he enjoyed his week working on the show with the trio so much that he asked them to create a new show for him as he knew Cheers was coming to an end (its final season would air in 1993). They obliged, first pitching a completely unrelated show for the star with plans for Grammer to play a paraplegic millionaire resembling Malcolm Forbes, "a magazine mogul [and] a motorcycle enthusiast". The idea was deemed unsuitable and scrapped. At the time they weren't interested in doing a Frasier Crane spin-off as they didn't want to become known as the "spin-off guys". However, the pitch was not what NBC and Paramount were looking for - and instead they firmly suggested Grub Street focus on continuing the storyline of the Frasier character, thus Frasier become the second major show produced by the company and arguably its most successful, winning many awards and garnering much critical praise. They decided to move Frasier Crane out of Boston to avoid any resemblance to Cheers. The spinoff idea would have focused primarily on "his work at a radio station", but they found that idea was too similar to an older sitcom, WKRP in Cincinnati. Therefore, they decided to add in his private life, such as his father Martin and brother Niles. In his titular spin-off, Frasier becomes "haughty, disdainful, and exceedingly uptight."

=== Other shows ===
Other series produced by Grub Street include The Pursuit of Happiness in 1995 and Encore! Encore! in the 1998–1999 season. Both of those short-lived series also aired on NBC.

== Dissolution and possible revival ==
After Encore! Encore!, which David Lee said "proved to be a disaster", he began to rethink his career, deciding to work in the theatre, and started to dissolve Grub Street Productions. "My partners and I still work together and it’s very amiable, but the partnership only exists as long as Frasier exists," he said.

The company has not been active since the series finale of Frasier in 2004. Grub Street was not reactivated for the 2023 reboot of Frasier for Paramount+, which was produced by separate companies.
