= American Screenwriters Association =

The American Screenwriters Association (ASA) is a community of screenwriters and filmmakers, sharing their combined knowledge of screenwriting and the movie industry. Its primary mission is to help emerging screenwriters hone their screenwriting skills and market their screenplays. They encourage dialogue between screenwriters, producers, filmmakers, actors and industry. They promote and market their members’ screenplays and develop relationships within the industry to increase member visibility.

American Screenwriters Association was founded in 1996 by John E. Johnson in Cincinnati, OH. Johnson created the organization in response to the void he perceived between emerging screenwriters and the industry. Four years later, ASA grew to 650+ members in 8 countries.

Johnson's career started while lunching with a friend in Wilmington, NC, when Johnson overheard an assistant producer discussing the need for more extras on a movie being filmed there, Simple Justice, starring Andre Braugher, Samuel L. Jackson and James Avery. Interrupting their conversation Johnson talked his way into a featured extra role playing a court reporter, photographer and spectator. He was a casting assistant for the independent movie This Train. Johnson wrote numerous screenplays (To No Avail, The True Life Adventures of Mr. and Mrs. Fish, The Last Time I Saw Eve, Christmas on Jane Street) and radio dramas, and eventually formed the American Screenwriters Association (ASA).

ASA hosts the ASA International Screenwriters Conference. It also sponsored the International Screenplay Competition, with more than 1,200 entries a year. Additionally, ASA initiated the Screenwriting Hall of Fame Awards, honoring individuals who have made contributions to the art of screenwriting.

Johnson was invited by the International Bar Association to be a panelist at the 57th Festival de Cannes, discussing adapting literary works into screenplay, and was a featured speaker at the Les Journées du scénario à Marseille ("Days of the Scenario in Marseilles") in Marseille, France. Johnson also taught at the Austin Film Festival, the Marco Island Film Festival, Baltimore Writer's Conference, the Midwest Music and Film Conference and the Waterfront Film Festival, and is a Second Decade Council member of the American Film Institute (AFI). He appeared on CNN International as a speaker on Racism in Hollywood and was featured in various trade publications and newspapers such as Screenwriting Secrets (Writers Digest), Script, Honolulu Star Bulletin and Creative Screenwriting.

American Screenwriting Association became dormant after Mr. Johnson's passing in 2008. The organization was reborn in January 2012 under the direction of Steven Kirwan (Executive Director, Editor, Publisher, Screenwriter).

In December 2012, American Screenwriters Association started a premier membership program entitled "ASA Insiders" to provide educational opportunities, contests, visibility and other benefits for members. American Screenwriters Association issues a free newsletter offering tips, recommendations, reviews, notices and gig announcements.

As of April 30, 2020, ASA subscribers numbered over 4,200.
