= Frasier =

American television sitcom (1993–2004)

- Genre: Sitcom
- Created by: David Angell; Peter Casey; David Lee
- Based on: Frasier Crane by Glen and Les Charles
- Showrunners: David Angell; Peter Casey; David Lee; Christopher Lloyd; Joe Keenan; Dan O'Shannon
- Starring: Kelsey Grammer; Jane Leeves; David Hyde Pierce; Peri Gilpin; John Mahoney; Dan Butler
- Theme music composer: Bruce Miller and Darryl Phinnesse
- Ending theme: "Tossed Salads & Scrambled Eggs" by Kelsey Grammer
- Country of origin: United States
- Original language: English
- No. of seasons: 11
- No. of episodes: 264 (list of episodes)

Production
- Executive producers: Peter Casey; David Lee; David Angell (seasons 1–8); Christopher Lloyd (seasons 2–7 & 11); Kelsey Grammer (seasons 6–11); Joe Keenan (seasons 6–7 & 11); Dan O'Shannon (seasons 8–10); Mark Reisman (season 8); Rob Hanning (seasons 9–10); Sam Johnson (seasons 10–11); Chris Marcil (seasons 10–11); Lori Kirkland Baker (seasons 10–11); Jeffrey Richman (seasons 10–11)
- Producer: Maggie Blanc
- Cinematography: Ken Lamkin
- Editor: Ron Volk
- Camera setup: 35 mm film; multi-camera
- Running time: 21–23 minutes
- Production companies: Grub Street Productions; Grammnet Productions (seasons 3–11, uncredited); Paramount Television Paramount Domestic Television

Original release
- Network: NBC
- Release: September 16, 1993 – May 13, 2004

Related
- Cheers (1982–1993); The Tortellis (1987); Wings (1990–1997); Frasier (2023 revival run)

Frasier (/ˈfreɪʒər/) is an American television sitcom that was broadcast on NBC for eleven seasons from September 16, 1993, to May 13, 2004. The program was created and produced by David Angell, Peter Casey, and David Lee (as Grub Street Productions), in association with Grammnet Productions (1995–2004) and Paramount Television.

The show was created as the third spin-off and a sequel to the sitcom Cheers. It continues the story of Frasier Crane (Kelsey Grammer), a psychiatrist who returns to his hometown, Seattle, as a radio show host. He reconnects with his father, Martin (John Mahoney), a retired police officer, and his younger brother, Niles (David Hyde Pierce), a fellow psychiatrist. The rest of the main cast consists of Peri Gilpin as Frasier's producer Roz Doyle, and Jane Leeves as Daphne Moon, Martin's live-in caregiver. Dan Butler's role as Bob "Bulldog" Briscoe, a sports talk show host on Frasier's station, was later upgraded from a recurring role to main character in some seasons. The part of Frasier's ex-wife, Lilith Sternin, was played by Bebe Neuwirth, reprising her role from Cheers.

Like its predecessor, Cheers, Frasier received critical acclaim, and is highly regarded in both the US and the UK. The series and the cast won 37 Primetime Emmy Awards, a record at the time for a scripted series. It also won the Primetime Emmy Award for Outstanding Comedy Series for five consecutive years. A revival series, also titled Frasier, premiered on the Paramount+ service on October 12, 2023.

== Overview ==
After the events of Cheers, psychiatrist Frasier Crane (Grammer) returns to his hometown of Seattle, Washington, from Boston, following the end of his marriage to Lilith. His plans for a new life as a single man are challenged when he is obliged to take in his father, Martin (Mahoney), a retired police detective who has mobility problems after being shot in the line of duty during a robbery.

Frasier and Martin conduct a series of job interviews for a physical therapist and caregiver for the latter. Martin, much to Frasier's dismay, is particularly keen on hiring a British caregiver as a live-in, and after a short squabble, the two agree to hire Daphne Moon (Leeves). Much of the series focuses on Frasier adjusting to living with his father, with whom he has little in common, and his constant irritation with Martin's dog, Eddie. Frasier frequently spends time with his younger brother, Niles (Pierce), a fellow psychiatrist, who becomes attracted to Daphne and eventually marries her.

Frasier hosts The Dr. Frasier Crane Show, a call-in psychiatry show on talk radio station, KACL. Though they share little in common, Frasier's producer, Roz Doyle (Gilpin), becomes his friend. She is depicted as both direct and sarcastic. Her somewhat superficial relationships with men are a frequent topic of conversation until she becomes pregnant with her daughter, Alice. Roz and Frasier share a professional respect and a wry sense of humor, and over time, the two become close friends. Frasier, along with the other characters in the series, often visits the local coffee shop, Café Nervosa, making it a frequent setting.

The Crane brothers, who have similar expensive tastes, intellectual interests, and high opinions of themselves, frequently clash with their more down-to-earth father, Martin. The close relationship between the brothers is often tense, and their sibling rivalry intermittently results in chaos. For two psychiatrists who make a living solving other people's problems, however, they are often inept at dealing with each other's hangups. Other recurring themes in the series include Niles's relationship with his unseen first wife, Maris (whom he later divorces); Frasier's relationship with his ex-wife, Lilith, who resides in Boston with their son, Frederick; Frasier's search for love; Martin's new life after retirement; and the various attempts by the two brothers to gain acceptance into Seattle high society.

Frasier seasons
Season	Episodes	Originally released		Rank	Viewers (millions)
Season	Episodes	First released	Last released	Rank	Viewers (millions)
1	24	September 16, 1993	May 19, 1994	7	26.4
2	24	September 20, 1994	May 23, 1995	15	21.1
3	24	September 19, 1995	May 21, 1996	11	20.6
4	24	September 17, 1996	May 20, 1997	16	17.5
5	24	September 23, 1997	May 19, 1998	10	18.3
6	24	September 24, 1998	May 20, 1999	3	23.9
7	24	September 23, 1999	May 18, 2000	6	21.8
8	24	October 24, 2000	May 22, 2001	13	15.8
9	24	September 25, 2001	May 21, 2002	16	15.7
10	24	September 24, 2002	May 20, 2003	32	13.1
11	24	September 23, 2003	May 13, 2004	35	12.0

== Characters ==
=== Main ===
Grammer, Hyde Pierce and Mahoney in character in an advertisement for US Treasury bonds

- Kelsey Grammer as Frasier Crane, a radio psychiatrist. He is fussy, uptight, cultured, and sometimes arrogant. Having grown up with an educated mother and an "average Joe" father, Frasier epitomizes an upper-class sophistication, yet is still sympathetic to working-class culture. After returning to Seattle, he begins embracing his more privileged background and develops a more selfish and aloof manner, possibly due to rekindling his relationship with his younger brother, Niles Crane. Despite his haughty demeanor, however, Frasier has a strong sense of ethics.
- Jane Leeves as Daphne Moon (later Crane), an English immigrant from Manchester; a physiotherapist and live-in aide hired by Frasier to help his father. Daphne's eccentric, working-class background and self-professed psychic abilities (which often end up being correct) frequently lead to Daphne's comical non-sequiturs about her unusual family, which is a sharp contrast to the Cranes' incredulity. In spite of their different upbringings, Niles falls for her instantly. Niles's obsession with Daphne and her obliviousness to this is developed throughout the earlier seasons of the series.
- David Hyde Pierce as Niles Crane, Frasier's younger brother. He is a psychiatrist in private practice. Educated, coldhearted, and more arrogant than Frasier, Niles's snobby, anxious qualities provide a foil for Frasier's own issues. Despite his aforementioned qualities, he is brave, caring, and well-meaning, which, to his loved ones, more than makes up for his eccentricities and quirks. Niles is very close to his older brother, though their fiercely competitive natures often provide the audience with much humor throughout the series. Like Frasier, Niles has a deep appreciation and respect for the arts, music, and pursuits that are seen as intellectual and prefers these activities over most sports, though he excels in squash and croquet. Niles is severely mysophobic, often given to wiping his hands after human contact, and is even depicted wiping down chairs in public places before sitting on them.
- Peri Gilpin as Roz Doyle, the producer of Frasier's radio show. A native of Bloomer, Wisconsin, Roz, one of two single women in the series, is depicted as a sharp contrast to Daphne. Throughout the show, Roz's search for love and liberal approach to dating is the subject of many witty remarks, particularly from Niles. In the middle of series' run, Roz becomes pregnant with her first child, Alice, and the show addresses some of the challenges of being a single mother, including Roz having to borrow money from her boss, and the personal and professional strain that places on their relationship.
- John Mahoney as Martin Crane, Frasier and Niles's father, is an outspoken and laid-back Seattle police detective who was forced to retire after sustaining a gunshot wound to his hip. Because this injury renders him incapable of living alone, upon Frasier's return to Seattle, Martin is forced to accept Frasier's invitation to live with him. Though he and his sons share few commonalities, the relationship between the three men strengthens throughout the series. Martin's relationship with his Jack Russell terrier, Eddie, and his pea-green tartan- and twill-upholstered duck tape stricken recliner are a perpetual source of distress for Frasier. He is also known for his fondness for beer (specifically that for Ballantine).
- Dan Butler as Bob "Bulldog" Briscoe (main seasons 4–6; recurring season 1; special appearance seasons 2–3; special guest seasons 7–11), a shock jock hosting a sports show that follows Frasier's time slot at KACL.
- Moose and Enzo as Eddie, Martin's Jack Russell Terrier.

=== Recurring ===
- Harriet Sansom Harris as Bebe Glazer (seasons 1–5, 7 & 9–11), Frasier's flirtatious and duplicitous agent. Described by Niles as "Lady Macbeth without the sincerity", she will use any method to get her or her clients the best deal.
- Patrick Kerr as Noel Shempsky (seasons 6–11; guest seasons 1 & 3–5), KACL technical assistant and avid Star Trek aficionado who speaks fluent Klingon and Spanish (allowing him to keeping his job when the station owner change formats in Season 5) In season one, Roz goes on one date with Noel and he is smitten with her ever since.
- Edward Hibbert as Gil Chesterton (seasons 2–8 & 10–11; guest season 1), KACL's posh, camp restaurant critic, his arguably "effeminate" nature is the source of many gay innuendos on the show, despite him revealing early in the series that he is married to a woman who is a car mechanic by trade.
- Marsha Mason as Sherry Dempsey (seasons 4–5), Martin's flamboyant girlfriend, whose tastes and opinions are often a cause of antagonism and arguments with the rest of the family.
- Tom McGowan as Kenny Daly (seasons 7–11; guest seasons 5–6), KACL's station manager
- Millicent Martin as Gertrude Moon (seasons 9–10; guest seasons 7, 11), Daphne's mother
- Brian Klugman as Kirby Gardner (season 9; guest season 8), a part-timer at KACL and the son of Frasier's former classmate
- Ashley Thomas as Alice Doyle (seasons 10–11; co-star season 9), Roz's daughter
- Felicity Huffman as Julia Wilcox (season 10; guest 11), host of a financial news segment, whose personality leads to frequent clashes with others at KACL
- Wendie Malick as Ronee Lawrence (season 11), Frasier and Niles's childhood babysitter who, after a chance meeting, becomes Martin's girlfriend
- Luke Tarsitano (season 3) and Trevor Einhorn (seasons 4–11) as Frederick Gaylord Crane, Frasier's son with ex-wife Lilith

=== Notes ===
The main cast remained unchanged for all 11 years. When the series ended in 2004, Grammer had portrayed the character of Frasier Crane for a total of 20 years, including his nine seasons on Cheers plus a one-time performance as the character on the series Wings, which earned Grammer an Emmy nomination. At the time, he tied James Arness' portrayal of Matt Dillon on Gunsmoke for the longest-running character on American primetime television. The record has since been surpassed in animation by the voice cast of The Simpsons, and in live action by Richard Belzer's portrayal of John Munch and Mariska Hargitay's portrayal of Olivia Benson (both on Law & Order: Special Victims Unit, among several other series). Grammer was briefly the highest-paid television actor in the United States for his portrayal of Frasier, while Jane Leeves was the highest-paid British actress.

In addition to those of the ensemble, additional story lines included characters from Frasier's former incarnation on Cheers, such as his ex-wife Lilith Sternin, played by Bebe Neuwirth, and their son, Frederick, played by Trevor Einhorn.

=== Guest stars ===
Throughout the series, numerous guest stars appeared such as:

- René Auberjonois
- Christine Baranski
- Kristin Chenoweth
- Erika Christensen
- Patricia Clarkson
- Gary Cole
- Kim Coles
- Robbie Coltrane
- Jennifer Coolidge
- Elvis Costello
- Brian Cox
- Alan Cumming
- Zooey Deschanel
- Illeana Douglas
- Griffin Dunne
- Aaron Eckhart
- Katie Finneran
- Victor Garber
- Ana Gasteyer
- Tony Goldwyn
- Richard E. Grant
- Luis Guzmán
- John Hannah
- Teri Hatcher
- Bob Hoskins
- Derek Jacobi
- Allison Janney
- James Earl Jones
- Jane Kaczmarek
- Michael Keaton
- Nathan Lane
- Anthony LaPaglia
- Piper Laurie
- Laura Linney
- Patti LuPone
- Virginia Madsen
- Patrick Macnee
- John C. McGinley
- Phil McGraw
- S. Epatha Merkerson
- Laurie Metcalf
- Brian Stokes Mitchell
- Donald O'Connor
- Estelle Parsons
- Rosie Perez
- Robert Picardo
- Teri Polo
- Saul Rubinek
- Mercedes Ruehl
- Eva Marie Saint
- Rebecca Schull
- Tony Shalhoub
- Marian Seldes
- Jean Smart
- Brent Spiner
- Patrick Stewart
- David Ogden Stiers
- Jennifer Tilly
- Jeanne Tripplehorn
- Sela Ward
- Rita Wilson
- Bellamy Young

Cheers co-stars who returned

- Bebe Neuwirth
- Shelley Long
- Ted Danson
- Woody Harrelson
- Rhea Perlman
- John Ratzenberger
- George Wendt

=== Reunions ===
Grammer had been the voice of Sideshow Bob on The Simpsons since 1990. In a 1997 episode (while Frasier was still in production), the character's brother, Cecil Terwilliger, was introduced, played by Pierce, as per the reference in the episode title, "Brother from Another Series". The episode contained numerous Frasier references, including a Frasier-style version of The Simpsons theme for a transition and its iconic title card for the same thing. Pierce returned as Cecil for the second time (the first since Frasier had concluded) alongside Grammer in the 2007 episode "Funeral for a Fiend". The episode introduced the brothers' father, Dr. Robert Terwilliger, who was portrayed by Mahoney.

Cast reunions also occurred on four episodes of Hot in Cleveland, which featured Leeves in the main cast along with Wendie Malick (who played Martin's girlfriend towards the end of Frasier). In the season-two episode "Unseparated at Birth" and season-three episode "Funeral Crashers", Mahoney guest-starred as a waiter smitten with Betty White's character. Gilpin appeared in the episode "I Love Lucci (Part 1)", and Tom McGowan (who played Kenny Daly) appeared in "Love Thy Neighbor" as a casting director. Hot in Cleveland was created and produced by Suzanne Martin, who wrote multiple episodes of Frasier.

== Production ==
=== Creation ===
During the eighth season of Cheers, Grammer made a deal with former Cheers producers David Angell, Peter Casey and David Lee (who were moving on to produce Wings) that they would do a new series together once Cheers ended. Once it became clear during the 10th season that the 11th would be the last, the group began working on their next series together.

Grammer did not originally want to continue playing Frasier Crane, and Angell, Casey and Lee did not want the new show to be compared to Cheers, which they had worked on before Wings. The three proposed that the actor play a wealthy, Malcolm Forbes-like paraplegic publisher who operated his business from his apartment. The main show featured a "street-smart" Hispanic live-in nurse who would clash with the main character. While Grammer liked the concept, Paramount Television disliked it, and suggested that the best route would be to spin off the Frasier Crane character. Grammer ultimately agreed to star in a Cheers spin-off, but the producers set the new show as far from Boston as possible to prevent NBC from demanding that other characters from the old show make guest appearances on the new show during its first season.

The creators did not want Frasier in private practice, which would make the show resemble The Bob Newhart Show. From an unused idea they had for a Cheers episode, they conceived the concept of the psychiatrist working in a radio station surrounded by "wacky, yet loveable" characters. After realizing that such a setting was reminiscent of WKRP in Cincinnati, the creators decided to emphasize Frasier's home life, which Cheers had rarely explored. Lee considered his own experience with "the relationship between an aging father and the grown-up son he never understood" and thought it would be a good theme for Frasier. Although Frasier had mentioned on Cheers (in two episodes) that his father, a research scientist, had died, Angell, Casey and Lee did not realize this was the case, as they were not working on Cheers during the season those two episodes were filmed. The creative team was already well into the development process when Grammer pointed out the discontinuity; they decided to overlook it, initially retconning the character's backstory. In a second-season episode, the discrepancy was resolved, as Frasier revealed he had lied to the Cheers gang about his father.

One element of the original concept that was carried over was the live-in health-care provider for Frasier's father. Grammer points out that very little of the Frasier Crane of Cheers carried over to Frasier, as his family history was changed (though this was later adjusted); the setting, his job and even the character himself changed from the Cheers predecessor, having to be more grounded as the central character of the show so the other supporting characters could be more eccentric.

=== Casting ===
Martin Crane was based on creator Casey's father, who spent 34 years with the San Francisco Police Department. The creators suggested to NBC that they would like to cast someone like Mahoney, to which NBC told them if they could get Mahoney, they could hire him without auditions. Both Grammer and the producers contacted Mahoney, with the producers flying to Chicago to show Mahoney the pilot script over dinner. Upon reading it, Mahoney accepted. Grammer, who had lost his father as a child, and the childless Mahoney immediately built a close father-son relationship.

In discussing Martin's nurse, Warren Littlefield of NBC suggested she be English instead of Hispanic, and suggested Leeves for the role. Grammer was initially reluctant, as he thought the casting made the show resemble Nanny and the Professor, but approved Leeves after a meeting and read-through with her. Mahoney and Leeves quickly bonded over their shared English heritage; Mahoney was originally from Manchester, the hometown of Leeves's character.

The character of Niles was not part of the original concept for the show. Frasier had told his bar friends on Cheers that he was an only child; however, Sheila Guthrie, the assistant casting director on Wings, brought the producers a photo of Pierce (whom she knew from his work on The Powers That Be) and noted his resemblance to Grammer when he first appeared on Cheers. She recommended him should they ever want Frasier to have a brother. The creators were "blown away" both by his resemblance to Grammer and by his acting ability. They decided to ignore Frasier's statement on Cheers and created the role for Pierce. Pierce accepted the role before realizing he had not read a script. Once he was given a script, he was initially concerned that his character was essentially a duplicate of Frasier, thinking that it would not work. The first table reading of the pilot script was notable because the producers had never heard either Pierce or Mahoney read lines, as they were cast without auditions.

The only main role that required an audition was Roz Doyle, who was named in memory of a producer of Wings. The producers auditioned around 300 actresses, with no particular direction in mind. Women of all ethnicities were considered. Lisa Kudrow was originally cast in the role, but during rehearsals, the producers decided they needed someone who could appear more assertive in her job and take control over Frasier at KACL, and Kudrow did not fit that role. The creators quickly hired Gilpin, their second choice.

The original focus of the series was intended to be the relationship between Frasier and Martin, and it was the focus of most of the first-season episodes. Once the show began airing, Niles became a breakout character, and more focus was added to the brothers' relationship, and other plots centering on Niles, starting in the second season. The producers initially did not want to make Niles's wife Maris an unseen character because they did not want to draw parallels to Vera, Norm's wife on Cheers. They originally intended that she would appear after several episodes, but were enjoying writing excuses for her absence so much that they eventually decided she would remain unseen, and after the increasingly eccentric characteristics ascribed to her, they concluded that no real actress would be able to portray her anyway.

=== Sets and settings ===
Title screen from the first half of the first season has a lit antenna spire at the Space Needle, one of the numerous animated gags.

Denver was the setting the show's creators agreed upon, far from Boston to distinguish it from Cheers. In 1992 Colorado voters passed Amendment 2, which permitted discrimination against gay people. Because of their objection to this, the creators moved the setting to Seattle.

Frasier's apartment was designed to be ultra-modern in an eclectic style (as Frasier himself points out in the pilot). One of the show's signature elements that it became well known for was the apartment's design which included elements such as a slightly split-level design, doors with triangular wooden inlay features, numerous pieces of well-known high-end furniture (such as a replica of Coco Chanel's sofa, and both an Eames Lounge Chair and a Wassily Chair) and a notable view from the terrace which was frequently complimented by visitors. The main set consisted of the open-concept living area with a sitting/TV space and dining area on the lower level and a piano exit to the terrace on the rear upper level. The set also included the kitchen through an open archway. A small section of the building corridor and elevator doors was built, as was a powder room near the front entrance. Two corridors off the living area ostensibly led to the apartment's three bedrooms. Sets for each of these rooms were built as separate sets on an as-needed basis.

No building or apartment in Seattle really has the view from Frasier's residence. It was created so the Space Needle, the most iconic landmark of Seattle, would appear more prominently. According to the season-one DVD bonus features, the photograph used on the set was taken from atop a cliff, possibly the ledge at Kerry Park, a frequent photography location. Despite this, Frasier has been said to have contributed to the emergence of an upscale urban lifestyle in 1990s Seattle, with buyers seeking properties in locations resembling that depicted in the show, in search of "that cosmopolitan feel of Frasier".

Another of the primary sets was the radio studio at KACL from which Frasier broadcasts his show. The studio itself consists of two rooms: the broadcast booth and the control room. A section of the corridor outside of the booth was also built (visible through the windows at the back of the studio) and could be shot from the side to view the corridor itself. The set was designed based on ABC's then-brand-new radio studios in Los Angeles which the production designer visited. Technical elements such as the microphones were regularly updated to conform with the latest technology. Although the studio set lacked a "front" wall (the fourth wall), one was built for occasional use in episodes with certain moments shot from behind the broadcast desk, rather than in front of it as usual.

The producers wanted to have a gathering place outside of home and work where the characters could meet. After a trip to Seattle, and seeing the many burgeoning coffee shops, the production designer suggested to producers that they use a coffee shop. Unlike many of the relatively modern coffee shop designs prevalent in Seattle, the production designer opted for a more warm and inviting style that would appear more established and traditional. Stools were specifically omitted to avoid any similarity to the bar on Cheers. Several Los Angeles coffee shops were used for reference. A bookcase was added on the back wall, suggesting patrons could grab a book and read while they enjoyed their coffee. The show used three versions of the interior set depending on how much space other sets for each episode required. If space for the full set was not available, a smaller version that omitted the tables closest to the audience could be used. If space for that set was lacking, a small section of the back of the cafe at the top of the steps could be set up under the audience bleachers. A set was also used on occasion for the exterior patio.

=== Filming ===
The cast had an unusual amount of freedom to suggest changes to the script. Grammer used an acting method he called "requisite disrespect" and did not rehearse with the others, instead learning and rehearsing his lines once just before filming each scene in front of a live studio audience. Although effective, the system often caused panic among guest stars.

In 1996, Grammer's recurrent alcoholism led to a car accident. The cast and crew performed an intervention that persuaded him to enter the Betty Ford Center, delaying production for a month.

Only one episode, "The 1000th Show", was filmed in Seattle. As with Cheers, most episodes were filmed on Stage 25, Paramount Studios, or at various locations in and around Los Angeles.

Filming was briefly disrupted by the September 11 attacks, during which David Angell was killed on board American Airlines Flight 11 while returning to California along with his wife Lynn. The cast and crew were devastated by their deaths, but Kelsey Grammer was concerned about the public perception of their grief in the context of a national tragedy, and so they did not extensively discuss Angell in the news after the attacks. Peri Gilpin later recalled that, after they had consistently avoided discussing the subject for awhile, the cast sat down on the set of Frasier's apartment and talked about their memories of the Angells for several hours, after which she felt significantly better.

=== Celebrity voice cameos ===
The KACL callers' lines were read by anonymous voice-over actors during filming in front of a live audience, and during post-production, the lines were replaced by celebrities, who actually phoned in their parts without having to come into the studio. The end credits of season finales show greyscale headshots of celebrities who had "called in" that season. Celebrities providing voices as callers include Gillian Anderson, Kevin Bacon, Halle Berry, Benjamin Bratt, Mel Brooks, Cindy Crawford, Billy Crystal, Phil Donahue, David Duchovny, Hilary Duff, Olympia Dukakis, Carrie Fisher, Jodie Foster, Art Garfunkel, Macaulay Culkin, Elijah Wood, Linda Hamilton, Daryl Hannah, Ron Howard, Eric Idle, Stephen King, Jay Leno, Laura Linney, John Lithgow, Yo-Yo Ma, William H. Macy, Henry Mancini, Reba McEntire, Helen Mirren, Mary Tyler Moore, Estelle Parsons, Rosie Perez, Freddie Prinze Jr., Christopher Reeve, Carly Simon, Gary Sinise, Mary Steenburgen, Ben Stiller, Marlo Thomas, Rob Reiner, Carl Reiner, Lily Tomlin, and Eddie Van Halen.

Some "callers" also guest-starred, such as Parsons, Perez and Linney (who played Frasier's final love interest in the last season).

=== Credits ===
The show's theme song, "Tossed Salads and Scrambled Eggs", is sung by Grammer and is played over the closing credits of each episode. Composer Bruce Miller, who had also composed for Wings, was asked to avoid explicitly mentioning any subjects related to the show such as radio or psychiatry. After Miller finished the music, lyricist Darryl Phinnesse suggested the title as they were things that were, like Frasier Crane's patients, "mixed up". The lyrics indirectly refer to Crane's radio show; "I hear the blues a-callin'," for example, refers to troubled listeners who call the show. Grammer recorded several variations of the final spoken line of the theme, which were rotated for each of the episodes. Other than season finales, a short, silent scene, often revisiting a small subplot aside from the central story of the episode, appears with the credits and song, which the actors performed without written dialogue based on the scriptwriter's suggestion.

The title card at the start of each episode shows a white line being drawn in the shape of the Seattle skyline on a black background above the show's title. In most episodes, once the skyline and title appear, the skyline is augmented in some way, such as windows lighting up or a helicopter lifting off. The color of the title text changed for each season (respectively: blue, red, turquoise, purple, gold, brown, yellow, green, orange, metallic silver, and metallic gold). Over the title card, one of about 25 brief musical cues evoking the closing theme is played.

=== Revival ===
On February 24, 2021, a revival series was greenlit for exclusive debut on Paramount+. The series premiered on October 12, 2023. Described as a "third act" and another spin-off, Grammer said he "gleefully" anticipated "sharing the next chapter in the continuing journey of Dr. Frasier Crane" as he had "spent over 20 years" of his "creative life on the Paramount lot". In October 2022, Paramount+ officially gave the series a season order of 10 episodes. In January 2023, Jack Cutmore-Scott joined the cast as Freddy Crane. It was also reported that English actor Nicholas Lyndhurst would be joining the cast. Anders Keith and Jess Salgueiro were later cast as Niles and Daphne's son and Freddy's roommate, respectively. In February, Toks Olagundoye was cast as Olivia.

== Relationship to Cheers ==
With the exception of Rebecca Howe (Kirstie Alley), all the surviving main regular cast members of Cheers made appearances on Frasier. Lilith Sternin (Bebe Neuwirth) was the only one to become a recurring character, appearing in a total of twelve episodes.

In the eighth-season Cheers episode "Two Girls for Every Boyd," Frasier tells Sam Malone (played by Ted Danson) that his father, a research scientist, had died. In the Frasier season-two episode "The Show Where Sam Shows Up," when Sam meets Martin, Frasier explains that at the time, he was angry after an argument with his father on the phone; however, in "The Show Where Woody Shows Up," when meeting Martin, Woody says he remembers hearing about him.

In the ninth-season episode of Frasier, 2002's "Cheerful Goodbyes", Frasier returns to Boston to give a speech, and Niles, Daphne, and Martin come along to see the city. Frasier runs into Cliff Clavin (played by John Ratzenberger) at the airport and learns that Cliff is retiring and moving to Florida. Frasier and company attend Cliff's retirement party, where Frasier reunites with the rest of the gang from Cheers (minus Sam, Woody, Diane and Rebecca), including bar regular Norm Peterson (played by George Wendt), waitress Carla Tortelli (played by Rhea Perlman), barflies Paul Krapence (played by Paul Willson) and Phil (played by Philip Perlman), and Cliff's old post-office nemesis Walt Twitchell (played by Raye Birk).

In the 11th-season episode of Frasier, "Caught in the Act," Frasier's married ex-wife, children's entertainer Nanny G, comes to town and invites him backstage for a rendezvous. Nanny G appeared on the Cheers episode "One Hugs, The Other Doesn't" (1992) and was portrayed by Emma Thompson. In this episode of Frasier, she is portrayed by Laurie Metcalf. A younger version of the character (this time played by Dina Waters) appears in the second episode of season 9 of Frasier, "Don Juan in Hell: Part 2," along with Neuwirth and Shelley Long reprising their roles of Lilith and Diane Chambers, respectively. In this episode, Rita Wilson also reprises her role as Frasier's mother, Hester, which she briefly debuted in the season 7 premiere, "Momma Mia;" in "Don Juan in Hell: Part 2," Diane also references the season 3 episode of Cheers, "Diane Meets Mom," in which Hester (then portrayed by Nancy Marchand) threatens Diane's life. Diane (again portrayed by Long) plays a central role in "The Show Where Diane Comes Back" (season 3, episode 14) and had a brief cameo in the season 2 episode "Adventures in Paradise: Part 2".

Some cast members of Frasier had appeared previously in minor roles on Cheers. In the episode "Do Not Forsake Me, O' My Postman" (1992), John Mahoney played Sy Flembeck, an over-the-hill jingle writer hired by Rebecca to write a jingle for the bar. In it, Grammer and Mahoney exchanged a few lines. Peri Gilpin appeared in a Cheers episode titled "Woody Gets an Election" playing a reporter who interviews Woody when he runs for office.

The set of Frasier was built over the set of Cheers on the same stage after it had finished filming.

== Reception ==
=== Critical reaction ===
Frasier is one of the most critically acclaimed comedy series of all time and one of the most successful spin-off series in television history. Critics and commentators have broadly held the show in high regard.

Caroline Frost said that the series overall showed a high level of wit but noted that many critics felt that the marriage of Daphne and Niles in season ten had removed much of the show's comic tension. Ken Tucker felt that their marriage made the series seem desperate for storylines, while Robert Bianco felt that it was symptomatic of a show that had begun to dip in quality after so much time on the air. Kelsey Grammer acknowledged the creative lull, saying that over the course of two later seasons, the show "took itself too seriously". Commentators acknowledged that there was an improvement following the return of the writers Christopher Lloyd and Joe Keenan, although not necessarily to its earlier high standards.

Writing about the first season, John O'Connor described Frasier as being a relatively unoriginal concept, but said that it was generally a "splendid act," while Tucker thought that the second season benefited greatly from a mix of "high and low humor". Tucker's comment is referring to what Grammer described as a rule of the series that the show should not play down to its audience. Kevin Cherry believes that Frasier was able to stay fresh by not making any contemporary commentary, therefore allowing the show to be politically and socially neutral. Other commentators, such as Haydn Bush disagree, believing the success of Frasier can be attributed to the comedic timing and the rapport between the characters. Joseph J. Darowski and Kate Darowski praise the overall message of the series, which across eleven seasons sees several lonely, broken individuals develop warm, caring relationships. While individual episodes vary in quality, the series as a whole carries with it a definitive theme and evolution from pilot to finale. The Economist devoted an article to the 25th anniversary of the show's premiere stating, "it is clear that audiences still demand the sort of intelligent and heartfelt comedy that Frasier provided."

Despite the criticisms of the later seasons, these critics were unanimous in praising at least the early seasons, with varied commentary on the series' demise ranging from believing, like Bianco, that the show had run its course to those like Dana Stevens, who bemoaned the end of Frasier as the "end of situation comedy for adults". Critics compared the farcical elements of the series, especially in later seasons, to the older sitcom Three's Company. NBC News contributor Wendell Wittler described the moments of misunderstanding as "inspired by the classic comedy of manners as were the frequent deflations of Frasier’s pomposity".

In 2017, 13 years after the show ended, Frasier was said to have experienced a "renaissance" on Netflix and "achieved a second life as one of the streaming service's most soothing offerings".

=== Awards ===
The series won a total of 37 Primetime Emmy Awards during its 11-year run, breaking the record long held by CBS's The Mary Tyler Moore Show (29). It held the record until 2016 when Game of Thrones won 38. Grammer and Pierce each won four, including one each for the fifth and eleventh seasons. The series is tied with ABC's Modern Family for the most consecutive wins for Outstanding Comedy Series, winning five from 1994 to 1998.

Grammer has been Emmy-nominated for playing Frasier Crane on Cheers and Frasier, as well as a 1992 crossover appearance on Wings, making him the only performer to be nominated for playing the same role on three different shows. The first year Grammer did not receive an Emmy nomination for Frasier was in 2003 for the 10th season. However, Pierce was nominated every year of the show's run, breaking the record for nominations in his category, with his eighth nomination in 2001; he was nominated a further three times after this.

In 1994, the episode "The Matchmaker" was ranked number 43 on TV Guide's 100 Greatest Episodes of All Time. In 2000, the series was named the greatest international programme of all time by a panel of 1,600 industry experts for the British Film Institute as part of BFI TV 100. In 2002, Frasier was ranked number 34 on TV Guide's 50 Greatest TV Shows of All Time. In a 2006 poll taken by Channel 4 of professionals in the sitcom industry, Frasier was voted the best sitcom of all time. In 2013, the Writers Guild of America ranked it #23 on their list of the 101 Best Written TV Series.

=== Fanbase and cultural impact ===
Frasier began airing in off-network syndication in March 2006. It is available on Cozi TV, Hallmark Channel, Amazon Prime Video, Hulu, Paramount+, Showtime, SkyShowtime, Peacock, Pluto TV and Crave in select countries. Netflix stopped offering the show in 2020.

The show's popularity has resulted in several fan sites, podcasts, and publications. Podcasts that look primarily at the show include Talk Salad and Scrambled Eggs with Kevin Smith and Matt Mira and Frasierphiles.

A soundtrack to the series was released in 2001.

==== Books ====
- Cafe Nervosa: The Connoisseur's Cookbook, claimed to be authored by Frasier and Niles Crane and published while the show was still in production.
- Frasier: A Cultural History by Joseph J. Darowski and Kate Darowski, published by Rowman & Littlfield in 2017 as part of their Cultural History of Television series, analyzes the show and offers insights into onscreen stories and behind-the-scenes efforts to shape it.
- Frasier: The Official Companion to the Award-Winning Paramount Television Comedy by Jefferson Graham offers a behind-the-scenes look at the series and several collections of scripts.
- My Life as a Dog, published as an autobiography of Moose, the dog who played Eddie in the first several seasons.

== Merchandising ==
=== Home media ===
Paramount Home Entertainment (through CBS DVD starting in 2006) released all 11 seasons of Frasier on DVD in Region 1, 2 and 4. A 44-disc package containing the entire 11 seasons was also released.

On April 7, 2015, CBS DVD released Frasier: The Complete Series on DVD in Region 1.

On November 8, 2022, Paramount Pictures released Frasier: The Complete Series on Blu-ray as a box set, containing 33 Blu-ray Discs with some extras and behind the scenes.

DVD releases of Frasier
DVD Name	Ep #	Release dates		
DVD Name	Ep #	Region 1	Region 2	Region 4
The Complete 1st Season	24	May 20, 2003	November 24, 2003	January 13, 2004
The Complete 2nd Season	24	January 6, 2004	June 7, 2004	June 3, 2004
The Complete 3rd Season	24	May 25, 2004	September 6, 2004	September 10, 2004
The Complete 4th Season	24	February 1, 2005	July 18, 2005	July 20, 2005
The Complete 5th Season	24	June 7, 2005	November 27, 2006	January 11, 2007
The Complete 6th Season	24	September 13, 2005	May 14, 2007	May 3, 2007
The Complete 7th Season	24	November 15, 2005	July 9, 2007	July 12, 2007
The Complete 8th Season	24	June 13, 2006	February 4, 2008	February 14, 2008
The Complete 9th Season	24	May 15, 2007	April 28, 2008	July 31, 2008
The Complete 10th Season	24	December 11, 2007	July 28, 2008	November 6, 2008
The Complete 11th & Final Season	24	November 16, 2004	September 15, 2008	January 15, 2009
The Complete Series	264	April 7, 2015	October 6, 2008	July 30, 2009
Christmas Episodes	8	October 10, 2017		

The first four seasons were also released on VHS along with a series of 'Best Of' tapes. These tapes consisted of four episodes taken from seasons 1–4.

VHS releases of Frasier
Video name	Release date
The Best of Frasier 1 – From Boston to Seattle	1999
The Best of Frasier 2 – Crane Vs. Crane	1999
The Best of Frasier 3 – Serial Dater	1999
The Best of Frasier 4 – Like Father Like Sons	1999
The Best of Frasier 5 – Brotherly Love	1999
The Best of Frasier 6 – Love Is in the Air	1999
The Best of Frasier Box Set	1999
The Complete 1st Season	July 16, 2001
The Complete 2nd Season	December 3, 2001
Season 3 – Part 1	May 6, 2002
Season 3 – Part 2	July 1, 2002
Season 4 – Part 1	October 14, 2002
Season 4 – Part 2	November 18, 2002

One Frasier CD was released featuring a number of songs taken from the show: Tossed Salads & Scrambled Eggs was released on October 24, 2000.

=== Books ===
Several books about Frasier have been released, including:

Frasier books
Title	Publisher	ISBN
The Best of Frasier	Channel 4 Books	ISBN 0-7522-1394-6
Cafe Nervosa: The Connoisseur's Cookbook	Oxmoor House	ISBN 0-8487-1550-0
Frasier	Pocket Books	ISBN 0-671-00368-2
The Frasier Scripts	Newmarket Press	ISBN 1-55704-403-1
Goodnight Seattle	Virgin Books	ISBN 0-7535-0286-0
Goodnight Seattle II	Virgin Books	ISBN 0-7535-0717-X
What's Your "Frasier" IQ: 501 Questions and Answers for Fans	Carol Publishing	ISBN 0-8065-1732-8
The Very Best of Frasier	Channel 4 Books	ISBN 0-7522-6179-7
Frasier: A Cultural History (The Cultural History of Television)	Rowman & Littlefield	ISBN 1-4422-7796-3
