= Peter Casey (screenwriter) =

American screenwriter

Peter Casey (born 1950) is an American television producer and screenwriter. Alongside his working partner David Lee, he wrote episodes of The Jeffersons. Besides writing, he and Lee wrote and produced Cheers, and co-created, wrote, and produced Wings and Frasier alongside David Angell under Grub Street Productions. He has won seven Emmys.
