= David Lee (screenwriter) =

American screenwriter, director and television producer

David Clark Lee (born 1950) is an American television producer, director, and writer.

Lee was raised in Claremont, California, and went to college at the University of Redlands. He co-wrote and co-produced The Jeffersons and Cheers with Peter Casey for six and four years, respectively. He and Casey co-created Wings and Frasier alongside David Angell under the Grub Street Productions.

He produced revival productions of Broadway musicals, including South Pacific starring Brian Stokes Mitchell and Reba McEntire, Can-Can, and Camelot. He co-wrote a newly revised script of Can-Can alongside Joel Fields when he was reviving the musical.

Lee has been nominated eighteen times for Primetime Emmy Awards; he won nine out of those nominations. He also won the Directors Guild Award, the Golden Globe Award, Producers Guild Award, GLAAD Media Award, British Comedy Award, three Television Critics Association Awards, two Humanitas Prizes, and the Peabody Award.

He was honored the 449th star, placed at Palm Springs Walk of the Stars, on March 18, 2022.

== Personal life ==
Lee is openly gay.

He paid US$3 million in 2002 (equivalent to $5,370,000 in 2025) for a Palm Springs estate built by architect Donald Wexler and originally resided in by Dinah Shore. He sold the estate to real estate agents for $5,995,000 in 2009 (equivalent to $8,997,000 in 2025), later purchased by Leonardo DiCaprio in 2014 for $5,230,000 (equivalent to $7,113,000 in 2025).
