= List of schools in Port Harcourt =

This is a list of notable schools in Port Harcourt, the capital city of Rivers State, Nigeria. It includes both public and private schools.

- Archdeacon Crowther Memorial Girls' School, Elelenwo
- Ash Merlyn International School, Elelenwo
- Bereton Montessori Nursery and Primary School
- Brookstone School Secondary, Igwuruta
- Charles Dale Memorial International School, Igwuruta-Eneka
- CITA International School, Rumuogba
- Faith Baptist College, Old GRA
- Federal Government Girls' College, Abuloma
- Government Comprehensive Secondary School, Borokiri
- Government Secondary School, Eneka
- Greenoak International School, New GRA
- Holy Rosary College, Old GRA
- Jephthah Comprehensive Secondary School, Ozuoba
- Jesuit Memorial College, Mbodo-Aluu
- Marygold International School, Elelenwo
- Methodist Girls High School
- Niger Delta Science School, Rumuola
- Norwegian International School, New GRA
- St. Benedict Immaculate Canadian Academy, Rukpokwu
- St. Mary's Catholic Model High School
- Stella Maris College
- Stepping Stone Educational Centre, D-line
- Trans Amadi International School

== See also ==
- List of schools in Rivers State
