= List of schools in Rivers State =

This is a list of notable primary and secondary schools in Rivers State, Nigeria, sorted by local government area.

== Bonny Island ==
- Spring Foundation School

== Etche ==
- CITA International School (Etche Campus)

== Gokana ==
- Saint Pius X College, Bodo City

== Ikwerre ==
- Brookstone School Secondary
- Charles Dale Memorial International School
- Jesuit Memorial College, Aluuccss

== Obio-Akpor ==
- Government Secondary School, Eneka

== Oyigbo ==
- Bishop Okoye Spiritan Secondary School, Afam

== See also ==
- List of schools in Nigeria
