= List of government agencies of Rivers State =

The following is a list of parastatals and agencies in the Government of Rivers State.

== Agencies and parastatals ==
Agencies and parastatals, typically reporting to a ministry, include:

- Rivers State Bureau on Public Procurement
- Road Maintenance and Rehabilitation Agency
- Road Traffic Management Authority
- Rivers State University
- Rivers State Television Authority
- Rivers State Sustainable Development Agency
- Ken Saro-Wiwa Polytechnic
- Rivers State Newspaper Corporation
- Rivers State Microfinance Agency
- Greater Port Harcourt City Development Authority
- Housing and Property Development Authority
- Rivers State College of Health Science and Technology
- Rivers State College of Arts and Science
- Rivers State University of Education
- Rivers State Broadcasting Corporation
- Rivers State Agricultural Development Programme
- Universal Basic Education Board
- Senior Secondary Schools Board
- Christian Pilgrims Welfare Board
- Local Government Service Commission
- Rivers State Waste Management Authority
- Muslims Pilgrims Welfare Board

== Commissions ==
- Rivers State Civil Service Commission
- Rivers State Independent Electoral Commission
- Rivers State Judicial Service Commission
- Rivers State Local Government Service Commission
- Rivers State Water Services Regulatory Commission

== Other ==
- Rivers State Fire Service
- Rivers State Economic Advisory Council
- Rivers State Internal Revenue Service
- Rivers State Police
- Rivers State Tourism Development Agency

== See also ==
- Government of Rivers State
- List of government ministries of Rivers State
