= Cita =

Cita or CITA may refer to:

- Cita, Texas
- Cita Morei, women's liberation and anti-nuclear weapons activist and writer
- MV Cita, a German merchant ship
- La Cita (album), a 1994 album by Mexican pop singer Daniela Romo.

== Acronyms ==
- Canadian Institute for Theoretical Astrophysics
- Cash in the Attic, a UK television show about antiques
- Caught in the Act (disambiguation) (various groups and media)
- Citizens Advice, the trading name of the National Association of Citizens Advice Bureaux, sometimes referred to as CitA although this usage is now deprecated
- CITA-FM in Moncton, New Brunswick
- Christ is the Answer, a Jesus movement
- CITA International School, in Port Harcourt, Nigeria
- Cyprus Inland Telecommunications Authority, telecommunications company in Cyprus

== See also ==
- Cita's World
