= Rivers State Broadcasting Corporation =

Public broadcaster

The Rivers State Broadcasting Corporation (RSBC) is a government owned, controlled and funded public broadcaster in Rivers State, Nigeria. It was created by Edict No. 8 of 1973. The headquarters of the Corporation is at 2 Degema Street in Port Harcourt.

The RSBC was originally set up by the government of Alfred Diete-Spiff to serve as an "umbrella body" for the state's radio and television stations including Radio Rivers and Rivers State Television. The Corporation is headed by a General Manager. Literary icon, Gabriel Okara was the first person to be appointed to the post.

== See also ==
- List of government agencies of Rivers State
- List of radio stations in Port Harcourt
