= NDS =

NDS may stand for:

== Places ==
- Lower Saxony (German: Niedersachsen), a federal state of Germany
- Norra Djurgårdsstaden, a neighborhood in Stockholm

== Groups, organizations ==
- National Design Studio, an agency of the White House Office
- National Directorate of Security, the primary foreign and domestic intelligence agency of Afghanistan
- NDS Group (News Digital Systems), a company specializing in television technology, including digital rights management, renamed Cisco Videoscape after its acquisition
- News Distribution Service, operated by the UK government's Central Office of Information
- New Democratic Party (Serbian: Нова демократска странка, Nova demokratska stranka), temporarily in 2014 the name for the Serbian political party Social Democratic Party (Serbia) (Социјалдемократска странка, Socijaldemokratska stranka, SDS)
- Nightdive Studios, a video game developer
- Nouvelle Démocratie Sociale, a political party in Burkina Faso known in English as New Social Democracy
- NEC Display Solutions, former name of Sharp NEC Display Solutions, a display manufacturer

== Computing, electronics, telecommunications ==
- NDS is also used as shorthand for VideoGuard, the encryption system created by NDS Group
- Navigation Data Standard, a format for automotive-grade navigation databases
- New Data Seal, a block cipher encryption algorithm that was designed at IBM in 1975
- Nintendo DS, a 2004 portable game system
- Novell Directory Services, former name for NetIQ eDirectory, directory service software for a network

== Other uses ==
- Low German (ISO 639 language code: nds), a West Germanic language native to Northern Germany, Denmark and the Netherlands
- New Design series, a currency series of the Philippine peso
- Nick Dal Santo (born 1984), Australian Rules footballer
- NASA Docking System, a spacecraft docking and berthing mechanism being developed for future US human spaceflight vehicles
- National Defense Strategy of the United States Secretary of Defense

== See also ==
- ND (disambiguation), for the singular of NDs
- NDSH
- NDSI (disambiguation)
- NDSL (disambiguation)
- NDSM
- NDSS (disambiguation)
- NDSU
- NDSV
- NDSW
