= Caught in the Act =

Caught in the Act may refer to:

== Film and television ==
- Caught in the Act (1931 film), a comedy film directed by Hanns Schwarz and Georges Tréville
- Caught in the Act (1941 film), an American comedy film directed by Jean Yarbrough
- Caught in the Act (1997 film), a comedy film starring Sara Crowe, Annette Badland, Nadia Sawalha and Paul Shelley
- Caught in the Act (2008 film), a comedy film written by and starring Steve Speirs as the lead character
- "Caught in the Act" (Frasier), a 2004 episode of Frasier
- "Caught in the Act" (The Goodies), a 1970 episode of The Goodies
- "Caught in the Act" (Modern Family), a 2011 episode of Modern Family
- "Caught in the Act" (The Outer Limits), a 1995 episode of The Outer Limits
- COPS: Caught in the Act, a 2004 DVD release of the American documentary television show COPS
- Caught in the Act, a sketch comedy series produced by David Dillehunt from 1999 to 2004

== Music ==
- Caught in the Act (group), a half English, half Dutch boy group

=== Albums ===
- Caught in the Act (Michael Bublé album), 2005
- Caught in the Act (Debra Byrne album), 1991
- Caught in the Act (Eric Church album), 2013
- Caught in the Act by Cinderella, reissue title of Live at the Key Club, 1999
- Caught in the Act (Commodores album), 1975
- Caught in the Act (Didirri album), 2023
- Caught in the Act, Eric Gable album, 1989
- Caught in the Act, Steve Gibbons Band album, 1977
- Caught in the Act (Grand Funk Railroad album), 1975
- Caught in the Act (Pamyua album), 2003 album by Pamyua
- Caught in the Act (Redgum album), 1983, or its title track
- Caught in the Act (Styx album), 1984

=== Songs ===
- "Caught in the Act", song by Chaka Khan from I Feel for You (1985)

== Other ==
- In flagrante delicto, Latin legal term for being caught in the commission of an offense
- Garfield: Caught in the Act, a 1995 game for the Sega Genesis
- Caught in the Act (ballet), 2000 ballet by Tim Rushton
- Caught in the Act, or Kilroy Was Here, a rock opera film by Styx

== See also ==
- Court in the Act
- Caught Red Handed, an American reality television series
