= Door Jam =

Door Jam can refer to:

- Doorjamb part of door frame
- A Frasier episode of the same name
- "Door Jam (2 Stupid Dogs)", an episode of 2 Stupid Dogs
