= Monday Onyezonwu =

The Honorable Monday Onyezonwu

Rivers State Commissioner of Special Duties
- Incumbent
- Assumed office 18 December 2015
- Governor: Ezenwo Nyesom Wike
- Preceded by: Dickson Umunakwe

Personal details
- Born: Monday Anyamaobi Onyezonwu; 27 April 1964 (age 62) Umuokewo, Omuma, Rivers State, Nigeria
- Party: PDP
- Education: Rivers State University of Science and Technology
- Profession: Lawyer

Monday Anyamaobi Onyezonwu (born 27 April 1964) is a lawyer serving as the current Rivers State Commissioner of Special Duties. He was sworn into the post on 18 December 2015 to replace Dickson Umunakwe.

== Early life and education ==
He was born in Umuokewo village, Omuma local government area of Rivers State. He received his primary education at State School Ohim–Oyoro between 1970 and 1976. He attended County Grammar School, Ikwerre–Etche from 1976 to 1981. His university education was at Rivers State University of Science and Technology where he earned a bachelor's degree in Law in 1986. He later attended the Nigerian Law School, from which he graduated in 1987.

== Career ==
=== Politics ===
As a politician, he has held numerous political offices such as Secretary of the defunct Rivers State Social Democratic Party; Legal Adviser, Omuma Local Government Council; Member, caretaker committee, Omuma local government area, Youth Leader, Rivers State People's Democratic Party. Member, governing board of Federal Medical Centre, Uyo and chairman, caretaker committee, Omuma local government area.

== See also ==
- List of people from Rivers State
- Emergency management
