= Chris Ezike =

Nigerian law enforcement officer

Chris Okey Ezike // (born 19?? in Anambra State) is a Nigerian law enforcement officer serving since 2015 as Commissioner of Police of the Rivers State Police Command. Before his promotion to CP, Ezike was Deputy Commissioner of Police (DCP) in-charge of Federal Special Anti-robbery Squad. He has headed the IG Anti-Crime Task Force in Edo and Kogi as well as the IG's Monitoring Unit of the Police Counter Terrorism Investigation Unit.

== See also ==
- Rivers State Police Command
- Rivers State Road Traffic Management Authority
