= Gabriela Ngirmang =

Palauan activist

- Born: 1922
- Died: 10 October 2007 (aged 84–85)
- Organization: Otil a Beluad
- Known for: Peace and anti-nuclear activism
- Children: Cita Morei

Gabriela Ngirmang (1922 – 10 October 2007) was a Palauan community leader and anti-nuclear campaigner. A senior woman of the Ikelau clan of Koror, she co-led the women's club Ngara Maibrel from the 1950s and was known by the honorific title Mirair, although her claim to it was disputed in court. Having grown up under Japanese rule and lived through the Second World War, she became a prominent opponent of the Compact of Free Association between Palau and the United States, which she argued would threaten Palauan land and the nuclear-free provisions of the country's constitution.

Ngirmang campaigned for the constitution from its drafting in 1979 and joined several legal challenges to the way the Compact was approved. In 1987 she was a lead plaintiff in a lawsuit brought by women elders, which was withdrawn amid violence and intimidation that included an explosion near her home. The case was reinstated in 1988, and Palau's courts held that the constitutional amendment at issue had not been properly enacted. She also took her campaign to the United States Senate and the United Nations Trusteeship Council, and helped to formalise the women's organisation Otil a Beluad.

Ngirmang remained active against the Compact into the 1990s. Otil a Beluad was nominated for the Nobel Peace Prize in the late 1980s and received a Global 500 Award from the United Nations Environment Programme in 1993, and Ngirmang was among a thousand women collectively nominated for the 2005 prize. She died in 2007.

== Early life ==
Ngirmang was born in 1922 to a father from Airai and a mother from Koror. Her father belonged to a high-ranking clan in Airai, and her mother's clan held major responsibilities in Koror. She was baptised a Catholic soon after birth.

Ngirmang grew up under Japanese administration and attended a Japanese-administered school for Palauan children. In a 2006 interview, she recalled that she had attended school for five years. While at school, and for eighteen months afterwards, she worked as a trainee in the household of a Japanese police officer. She later described the separate and shorter schooling given to Palauan children as discrimination.

After marriage, Ngirmang lived in Melekeok, where she was living when air raids on Palau began in 1944. She later recalled taking refuge in the forest during the bombing and feeding her baby on giant taro and coconut because food was scarce. The family moved to Koror in 1946, where her husband worked as a mechanic at the power plant. Ngirmang had 11 children, including her daughter Cita Morei, who served as her translator in later interviews.

== Community and traditional leadership ==
Around 1954, at the age of 32, Ngirmang became a co-leader of Ngara Maibrel, a women's club in Koror, alongside a woman from the Idid clan. Membership was restricted to women whose maternal line came from Koror. The club's leaders organised civic projects and were concerned with the welfare of its members. The ethnographer Lynn Wilson described Ngirmang as the female head of the Olngebang lineage of Ikelau, one of the leading clans of Koror.

Mirair is the second-ranking women's title in Koror, after Bilung. Its holder is the highest-ranking woman of eastern Koror. During Palau's 1979 constitutional convention, Ngirmang acted on behalf of the elderly titleholder, Merii. In 1989 the senior women of the Olngebang lineage named Ngirmang as the next Mirair. Another family disputed her appointment, saying that one of their own relatives held the title. The case came to court in mid-1990, and was the first lawsuit over a woman's clan title in Palau to be decided by a court. The trial judge ruled in favour of the other claimant, but an appellate decision in May 1992 held that neither woman had become Mirair and that the title remained unfilled. According to her daughter, Ngirmang felt that a court applying written law was the wrong place to settle the dispute, because the "fluidity of the Palauan custom is its strength". Later sources refer to her as Mirair, and in 2006 she spoke of twelve unpaid years of work in that role.

== Anti-nuclear activism ==
=== Constitution, 1979–1986 ===
Ngirmang said that she had at first supported free association with the United States, which she understood as a route to independence. Her position changed during the 1979 constitutional convention, after a telegram from the US ambassador urged delegates to rewrite provisions of the draft. She helped to organise food for the delegates and observed their proceedings.

In July 1979, 92 percent of Palauan voters approved a constitution that barred nuclear weapons and materials without the approval of three-quarters of the votes cast in a referendum. The sociologist Zohl dé Ishtar credits Ngirmang with an instrumental part in securing the nuclear-free provision. When a revised constitution was later proposed, Ngirmang joined opponents who camped out and spoke in front of the legislature. Supporters of the revision visited her in an attempt to win her over, but she did not change her position.

During the referendums on the Compact of Free Association in the 1980s, Ngirmang worked with Kltal Reng, a women's group that ran its own public education campaign on the agreement. She gave evidence in a case over the wording of a Compact ballot, which she argued would lead voters to approve the agreement whatever their intention. She was also one of the plaintiffs in Gibbons v. Salii, where Palau's appellate court ruled in September 1986 that the Compact needed 75 percent voter approval and had not been ratified.

Ngirmang said that her main reason for opposing the Compact was anti-nuclear, and that another was the risk that the US military could take Palauan land. She warned that a US military presence would make Palau a target again, recalling her memories of war and hunger. She also feared that Palauans could become a minority in their own islands, and cautioned that an agreement made by her generation would bind children who had no say in it. She described land as the most valuable thing Palauans had and as the basis of their identity. Ngirmang did not describe her campaigning as politics, but said that she simply did not want the military in Palau.

=== 1987 lawsuit ===
In mid-1987 President Lazarus Salii laid off most government employees, saying that the government could not pay them until an agreement with the United States was reached. On 4 August, the legislature passed an amendment lowering the majority needed to override the constitution's nuclear provision from 75 to 50 percent, and the Compact then received 73 percent of the vote in a referendum. At the end of the month, 38 women filed Ngirmang v. Salii to contest the approval process, with Ngirmang and Rafaela Sumang as lead plaintiffs.

Plaintiffs later told investigators from the US General Accounting Office (GAO) that they had felt intimidated by furloughed government workers and by rumours of violence. According to her family's account, Salii had asked to see Ngirmang about her withdrawing from the lawsuit, but she refused. Bedor Bins, the father of the anti-Compact attorney Roman Bedor, was shot dead on 7 September 1987. An explosion occurred the same night at or near Ngirmang's home. Accounts differ in the details: Wilson wrote that the bomb was next to Ngirmang's house, a 1988 article in Pacific Daily News says her front yard was blown up, and dé Ishtar said that the house was firebombed. The GAO report refers to an explosion in a field near a plaintiff's home, and states that no plaintiff was physically attacked or suffered serious property damage. Ngirmang's written statement to the US Senate said that one of her daughters had been injured. She told an interviewer in 1988 that she had been afraid, but that thinking of others who were frightened made her want to be brave.

The plaintiffs did not attend the hearing on 8 September, and the two lead plaintiffs agreed with government officials to file for dismissal. The judge provided for the suit to be reopened because the plaintiffs appeared to have been intimidated. Palau's attorney general reported that the women had withdrawn in the interests of national harmony, whereas twelve plaintiffs told the GAO that they had been afraid to continue.

=== International advocacy and reinstatement ===
Ngirmang travelled to Washington, D.C., in January 1988 to testify before the United States Senate Committee on Energy and Natural Resources, but was hospitalised before the hearing. Her statement was read by Isabella Sumang. In it she said that Palauans assumed the United States would at some point use any options it sought on their land. News reports at the time differed in their descriptions as to whether Ngirmang experienced a stroke or a heart attack, and Wilson records that her family said that she had open-heart surgery. She spent nearly six months away from Palau.

In January 1988, Salii wrote to one of the lead plaintiffs offering police protection to anyone who wished to refile. In March, plaintiffs from the earlier case moved to set aside its withdrawal, with Ngirmang as lead plaintiff and more than 100 participants. The court reinstated the suit on 5 April as Fritz v. Salii, and on 22 April held that the amendment had not been properly enacted and that the referendum on it was void. The appellate division upheld the decision in August.

According to her family's account, Ngirmang met Palauans in California during her recovery and went on to petition the United Nations Trusteeship Council in May 1988. She also spoke at a Jesse Jackson rally in San Francisco, telling the audience that the Pacific should be an ocean of peace.

=== Otil a Beluad and later activism ===
Ngirmang proposed formalising the existing network of women opposed to the Compact, naming the group Otil a Beluad, or "anchor of our land". She said that it would bring together women in each village to speak to people directly about the Compact and government corruption. The group's aims included encouraging women to participate in political debate, upholding the constitution and challenging corruption. Bob Aldridge and Ched Myers, authors of Resisting the Serpent: Palau's Struggle for Self-Determination (1990), date its establishment to December 1988, with Ngirmang as a co-chairperson. Its methods included environmental education, community consciousness-raising, monitoring of the national congress and petitions against legislation.

In March 1993, an article in The Windsor Star described Ngirmang, then 70, as the unofficial leader of Otil a Beluad. Dé Ishtar writes that the constitutional threshold was eventually lowered from 75 to 50 percent, that the women filed further lawsuits in 1994 but withdrew them, and that Palau became independent in October 1994.

== Death and legacy ==
In 1988, the organization Ngirmang led, Otil A Beluad was nominated for a Nobel Peace Prize, and Ngirmang was among those nominated for the 2005 Nobel Peace Prize by the 1000 Women for Peace campaign. In 1993 Otil A Beluad received the Global 500 Award from the United Nations Environment Programme.

Ngirmang and Morei worked closely with Wilson on Speaking to Power (1995), an ethnography of gender and politics in Palau based on nearly two hundred hours of recorded conversations. Ngirmang died on 10 October 2007 after a period of illness.

== See also ==
- List of peace activists
