= Spring Foundation School =

Location
- 14 Jack Manilla Pepple Street; Bonny Island, Rivers State; Nigeria

Information
- Type: Private
- Established: 1998 (28 years ago)
- Principal: Precious Akunna
- Teaching staff: 33
- Gender: Coed
- Age: 3 to 18
- Enrollment: 550 (2014)
- Classrooms: 15
- Colours: Black, White & Pink
- Website: Spring Foundation School

Spring Foundation School is a private non-denominational coeducational Christian school located in Bonny Island, Rivers State, Nigeria. The school was established to partner with parents and to provide a Christ-centered learning atmosphere where children are encouraged to grow intellectually and spiritually. The school provides education to senior secondary, junior secondary, primary, nursery and pre-nursery levels. The current principal of the school in charge of discipline is Precious Akunna.

== School uniforms ==
All students of Spring Foundation are required to attend classes in school uniforms. For Mondays, Tuesdays and Thursdays, the uniform is white and black draft shirt on an ox-blood trouser, black shoes and belt. On Wednesdays, the uniform is pink and white checkered shirt while the school's sports wears are for Fridays only.

== Houses ==
Every student admitted to the school is assigned to one of its four houses. These houses participate in various sporting and cultural competitions throughout the year. The current houses are: Nelson Mandela (Blue), Mahatma Gandhi (Yellow), Martin Luther King (Green) and Lord Lugard (Red).

== Achievements ==
In 2015, the school won the NNPC/MPN Quiz Competition in Bonny, scoring 34 points.

== See also ==
- List of schools in Rivers State
