= Rivers State Internal Revenue Service =

Government agency in Rivers State, Nigeria

- Abbreviation: RIRS
- Formation: 1993
- Type: Government agency
- Purpose: Revenue generation
- Headquarters: Revenue House, Plot GS/1, Amadi Ama Layout, Port Harcourt.
- Coordinates: 4°46′34″N 7°1′7″E
- Region served: Rivers State, Nigeria
- Chairman: Chibeoso Aholu
- Website: www.riversbirs.gov.ng

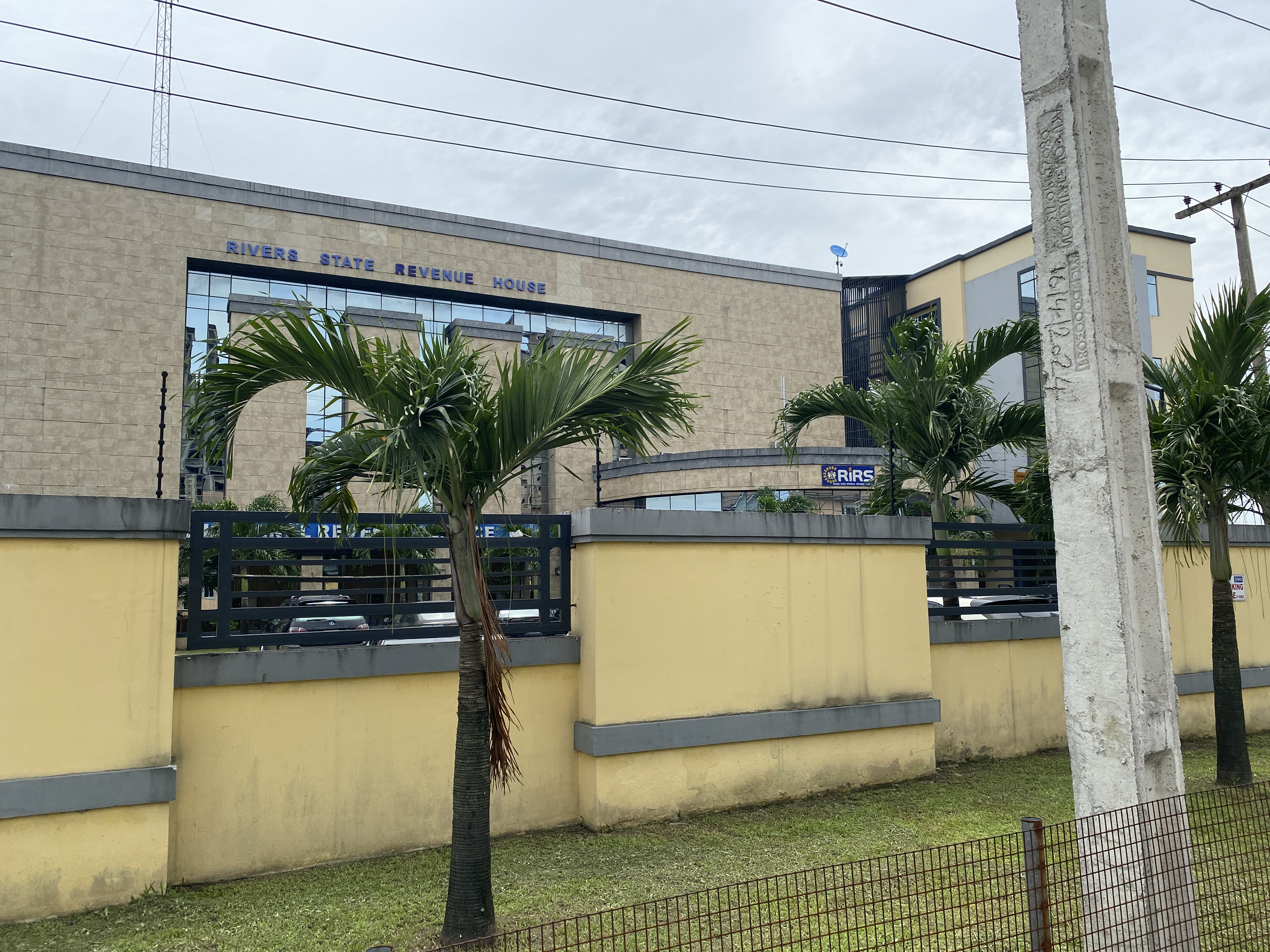

The Rivers State Internal Revenue Service (RIRS) was formed in 1993 under the Board of Internal Revenue Law 1993 (No. 3). It is a government agency entrusted to assess, collect and account for all taxes, fees and levies in Rivers State, Nigeria. It is involved in the formulation of tax policy as well as the supervision of revenue collection due to the state. Its headquarters is at Plot GS/1, Amadi Ama Layout, Port Harcourt in GRA, Port Harcourt .

A new Board, led by Chibeoso Aholu, was inaugurated on 17 February 2021 to boost the revenue of the state and reposition the Service. Chibeoso Aholu since assumption of office embarked on sweeping reforms to expand the tax net and plug leakages. Some of the key reforms made include a restructuring of the personnel to boost efficiency, process review and optimization, and the launch of an innovative tax management system, RIVTAMIS, to automate the entire tax process of the state and engender transparency. Recently, the Board also launched a unified ticketing system for the Transport Sector, which has been hailed by all stakeholders. The system, new to the country, eliminates touting and multiple taxation, and plugs leakages through the use of scratch cards.

In line with global best practices, the current Board deployed a Tax Management System, known as RIVTAMIS, to automate the Tax Process, and allow taxpayers to carry out key tax functions. The RIVTAMIS Server went live in December 2017, but was formally launched by the Governor of Rivers State in April 2018. RIVTAMIS, Rivers State Tax Management Information System, is an online platform that provides taxpayers and tax administrators a convenient and effective means of paying and managing taxes and tax information. It has been widely acclaimed in the industry by respected practitioners and taxpayers. RIVTAMIS provides the general tax-paying public the very rare opportunity to not only pay their taxes but to own their tax records and tax-related activities. Key features include convenience and ease, secured transactions, key functionalities such as online tax payment, e-filing of annual returns, requests for tax clearance, online receipting, online registration, etc.

Within this period, there has been an unprecedented increase in revenue. Records for both month-on-month and year-on-year revenue collection in the state has been broken, and new ones set. It is noteworthy to mention that the first half of the period under review, was during the biting period of recession, marked by economic hardship and loss of jobs. Also, within the period under review, there was an exponential enrollment in the tax net, by citizens. This was due to the steps taken to plug revenue nets by dismantling unnecessary roadblocks to the service, elimination of touting and unnecessary middlemen, the introduction of innovative collection systems, as well as robust tax education and stakeholder engagement.

== See also ==
- List of government agencies of Rivers State
