= St. Benedict Immaculate Canadian Academy =

Location
- 3 Bica Avenue; Rukpokwu, Port Harcourt, Rivers State; Nigeria

Information
- Type: Private, preschool, primary, day and boarding high school
- Motto: The academic place with possibilities
- Religious affiliation: Christian
- Established: 2008
- Status: Open
- Proprietress: Funke Jack
- Gender: Mixed
- Campus type: Urban
- Website: stbicaacademy.edalafsms.com

St. Benedict Immaculate Canadian Academy (also known as St. BICA Academy or St. Benedict) is a private, Christian coeducational school offering preschool, primary and secondary education. It is located in the Rukpokwu neighborhood of Port Harcourt, Rivers State, and was established in 2008.

The initial intake of St. Benedict when it started was less than twenty students. However, it has continued to expand with number of students running into hundreds. In spite of this, the school promotes personalized learning through small class sizes. Its secondary section has facilities for both day and boarding programmes.

== Curriculum ==
St. Benedict follows a Canadian based curriculum combined with features from the British and the Nigerian models, concurrently in pursuit of the fulfillment of its visions which include educating the student for global citizenship.

== See also ==
- List of schools in Port Harcourt
