= Bereton Montessori Nursery and Primary School =

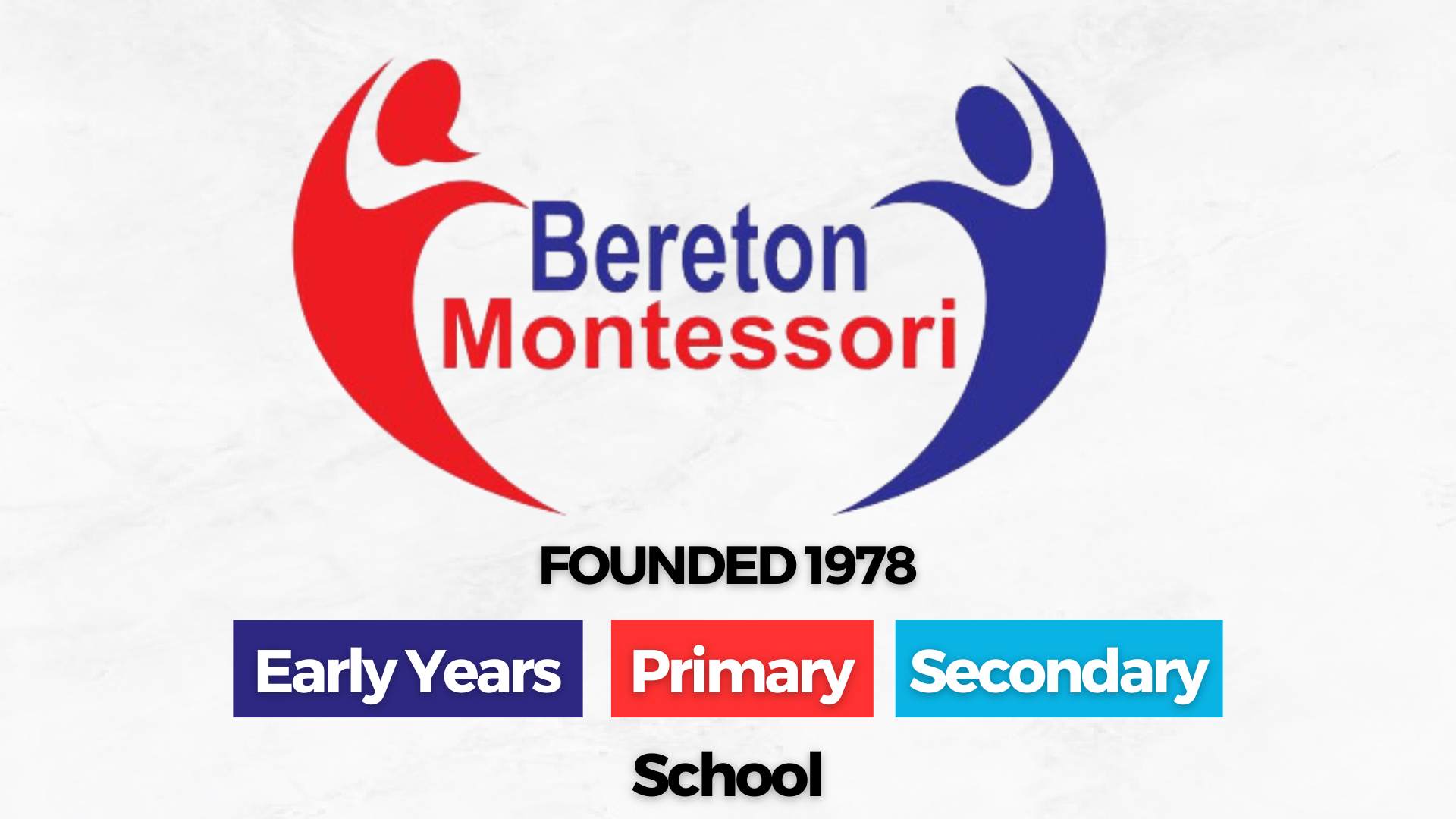

Location
- 8 Ernest Ikoli Street, Old GRA, and Plot 270, Liberation Stadium Road, GRA Phase IV, Rumumasi, Port Harcourt, Rivers State; Nigeria

Information
- School type: Early Years | Primary | Secondary School
- Motto: Diligence and Excellence
- Established: 1978
- Founder: Chief (Mrs.) Victoria Diete-Spiff
- Sister school: Charles Dale Memorial International School
- Category: School
- School number: +2348150903460
- Director: Princess Elfrida Omole
- Nursery years taught: 3 - 5 Years
- Primary years taught: Basic 1–6
- Secondary years taught: Basic 7–12
- Campus type: Day school
- Website: https://beretonmontessori.com
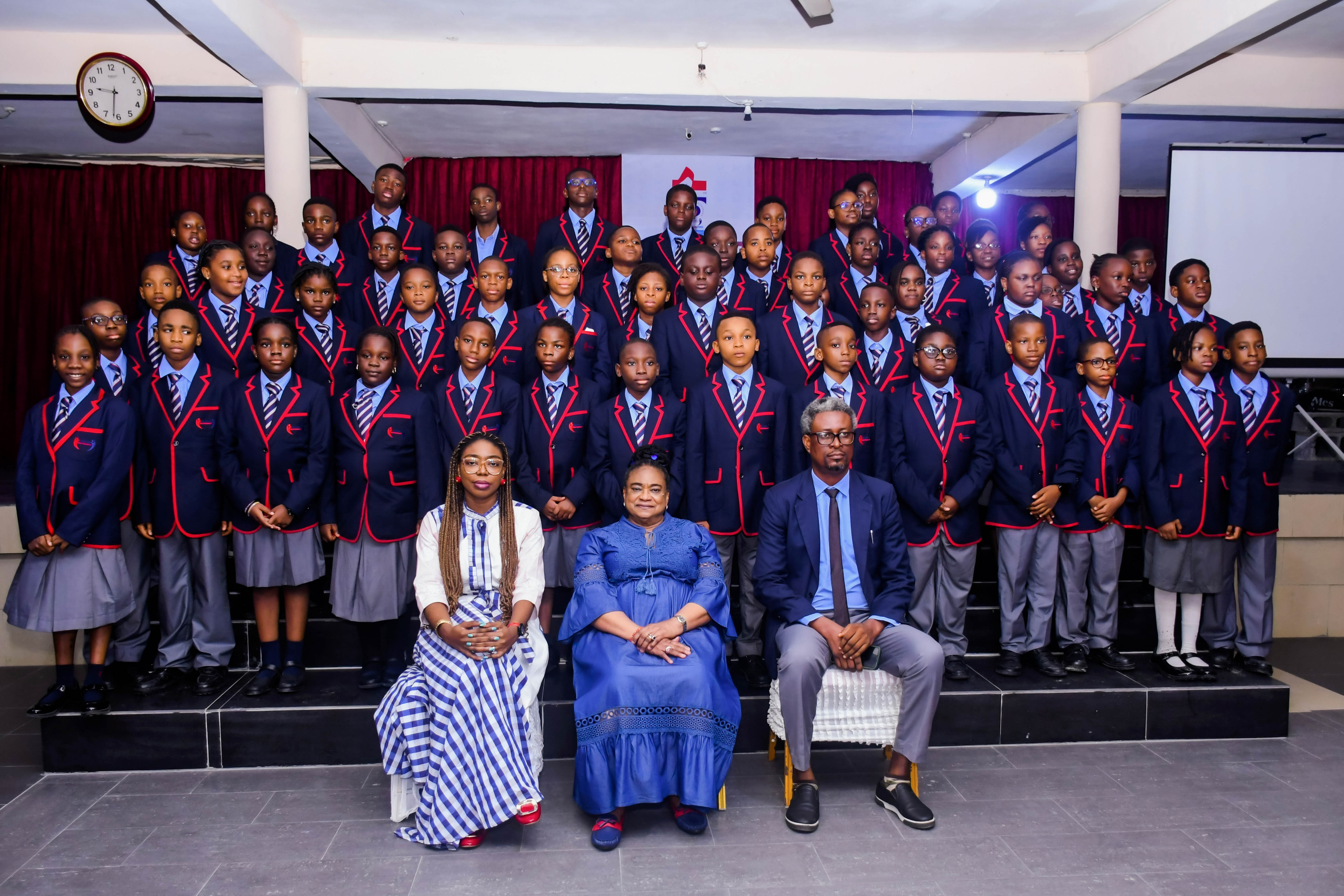

Bereton Montessori Early Years, Primary and Secondary School is a private, mixed-sex education school in Rivers State, Nigeria. The school has campuses in Old GRA and Stadium Road in Port Harcourt. As its name suggests, the school consists of a nursery, primary and secondary school approved by the Rivers State government.

== Background ==
Bereton Montessori was founded by Dale's daughter, Victoria Diete Spiff. The school opened on 10 September 1978 as a nursery school. At its inception, the school had about 120 pupils in eight classrooms. It was upgraded with a primary school in January 1983.

Bereton Montessori is affiliated with Charles Dale Memorial International School.

== Notable alumni ==
- Agbani Darego - Nigerian model and beauty queen

== See also ==
- List of schools in Port Harcourt
- Charles Dale Memorial International School
