= Wave 91.7 FM =

- Port Harcourt, Rivers State; Nigeria
- Broadcast area: Port Harcourt
- Frequency: 91.7 MHz

Programming
- Language: English

Ownership
- Owner: South Atlantic Media

History
- First air date: 1 September 2011

Technical information
- Transmitter coordinates: 4°46′39″N 7°0′37″E

Links
- Website: https://www.wavefm917.com/

Wave 91.7 FM, is a mixed news, talk, and music radio station based in Port Harcourt, Nigeria. The station began operating on a regular basis on 1 September 2011. It is currently owned by South Atlantic Media and broadcasts from studios in 30 Forces Avenue, Old GRA at the frequency of 91.7 on the FM band.

== See also ==
- List of radio stations in Port Harcourt
