= NDSS =

NDSS may refer to the following:

- Nanaimo District Secondary School in Nanaimo, British Columbia, Canada
- Napanee District Secondary School in Napanee, Ontario, Canada
- National Diabetes Services Scheme
- New Democratic Party of Serbia (Nova demokratska stranka Srbije), a political party in Serbia
- Niagara District Secondary School in Niagara-on-the-Lake, Ontario, Canada
- Niger Delta Science School in Port Harcourt, Nigeria
- North Delta Secondary School in Delta, British Columbia, Canada
- Norwell District Secondary School in Palmerston, Ontario, Canada
- National Down Syndrome Society, an organization based in Manhattan, New York City, New York, USA
- Niggaz Done Started Something song by rapper DMX featuring rap group The LOX and Mase from the album It's Dark and Hell Is Hot
