= Igwuruta =

Nigerian town

Igwuruta is one of the big towns in Ikwerre Local Government Area of Rivers State, Nigeria. It is made up of 9 villages; Igwuruta-Ali, Omuodukwu, Omunobo, Omuchi, Omuohia, Omueke, Agboga, Omumah and Omunwei. It is located near Omagwa, a community hosting the Port Harcourt International Airport. Its geographic coordinates are: 4°57′15″N 7°0′45″E (4.9543911, 7.0126247). with a population of 50,000 people. Schools found in Igwuruta area include: Brookstone School Secondary, Charles Dale Memorial International School, Springflowers International Schools, Queens International High School, Ozulems International Montessori School, Beryl Education Centre and Evidence Bloom School.

== See also ==
- Ikwerre people
- Ikwerre, Rivers State
