= Elelenwo =

- Neighbourhood
- Interactive map of Elelenwo
- Coordinates: 4°50′13″N 7°4′12″E
- Country: Nigeria
- State: Rivers State
- LGA: Obio-Akpor
- City: Port Harcourt
- Time zone: UTC+1 (WAT)

Elelenwo is a neighbourhood in the metropolitan area of Port Harcourt, Nigeria, a country in West Africa. It is home to several state-owned media establishments, including Rivers State Television (RSTV) and Radio Rivers.

== Location ==
Elelenwo shares a border to the south with Eleme, beyond which lies Okrika Island. Otigba and Woji are on the western border, with Trans Amadi lying further west. Oil Mill Market is on the northern border and Rumukurusi is even further north. Iriebe is on the eastern border and the Oyigbo local government area is east of Iriebe.

== Overview ==
Elelenwo consists largely of mixed-income apartment buildings, public and privately owned estates, and single-family homes of varying styles. Some estates in Elelenwo includes Victory estate, Eliminigwe Housing Estate, Pentagon Estate, amongst others. The Elelenwo police station is the only police station in town.

== Education ==
Elelenwo residents have access to a handful of Port Harcourt public and private schools, including:

=== Public schools ===
- State Primary School
- Community Boys Secondary School

=== Private schools ===
- Ash Meryln International School, Elelenwo
- Archdeacon Crowther Memorial Girls' School (ACMGS)
- Moncordel International School
- Marygold International School, 58 Station Road
- Covenant Group of Schools, 1 Grace Avenue
- Salvation Heights Secondary Schools
- Crystal Brooks College — a primary and secondary school

=== Landmarks ===
- Market Square, Old Refinery Road, Elelenwo
- Radio Rivers
- RSTV
