= NDSI =

NDSI may refer to:

- Novell Data Systems, Inc.
- Nintendo DSi, a 2008 handheld video game console
- Nintendo DSi XL, a larger version of the DSi, released in 2009

== See also ==
- NDS (disambiguation)
