= Crime in Rivers State =

Crime in Rivers State is present in various forms. The most common crimes are murder, rape, kidnapping, armed robbery, gang-related violence and petty crime.

According to the 2016 National Bureau of Statistics crime report, Rivers State, with an estimated population of 7.3 million, had the third highest total crime rate and the third highest property crime among six states with over 4 million population in Nigeria.

Since the mid-2000s, the House of Assembly has enacted strict sentencing laws to prevent and reduce criminal occurrences, including tackling the root causes of crime in the entire state.

== Crime by type ==
=== Sexual violence ===
The Criminal Code Act of 2004 defines rape as the "unlawful carnal knowledge of a woman or girl without her consent, or with her consent if the consent is obtained by force or by means of threat or intimidation of any kind or by fear of harm, or by means of false and fraudulent representation as to the nature of the act, or in the case of a married woman by personating her husband."

Many of the rape cases occur in the suburbs of the state capital including the waterfronts and densely populated areas with shanties and other surrounding communities. A significant number of child sexual abuse cases have also been reported in various parts. Approximately, 85% of all sexual offense arrests were committed by first-time sex offenders.

=== Kidnapping ===
Kidnapping is one of Rivers State's most common crimes against foreigners and at times locals. They are often carried out by ordinary criminals as well as militants demanding a greater share of oil riches for indigenes.

Rivers State has been reported as being one of the states with the highest level of kidnapping in the country. In 2015, there were about 294 reported cases. Hostages are usually released unharmed after ransom payments.

=== Robbery ===
There have been many incidents of robbery, both those at gunpoint and without guns, which makes it an issue in Rivers State. A UNDP report compiled from government sources showed that 840 cases of robbery were recorded by police between 2001 and 2009. The trend of annual changes in the number of such incidents shows that robbery cases increased in 2001 and 2002 with the advent of mobile communication. The highest annual frequencies of armed robbery were recorded in 2004 and 2005 followed by a period of decline until 2008.

Government efforts to suppress this criminal act against residents and organizations in the state have also increased in recent years. Under state law, the punishment for taking the property of another, with the intent to permanently deprive the person of that property, by means of force or fear can range from a fine to life imprisonment.

== By location ==
=== Port Harcourt ===
High crime neighborhoods in the capital include Rumuola, Diobu, D-line, Abuloma, Ogbunabali, Ikwerre Road and Borokiri.

== Policing ==
Rivers State Police has the responsibility of maintaining public order and safety, enforcing the law, and preventing crime. It is headed by a Commissioner of Police and has 3 area commands with 52 divisional police headquarters, 25 police stations and 23 police outposts. The total staff strength is about 17,207.
