= Radio Rivers 99.1 =

Radio Rivers FM
- Port Harcourt; Nigeria
- Broadcast area: Rivers State
- Frequency: 99.1 MHz

Programming
- Languages: Mixed indigenous and English

Ownership
- Owner: RSG

History
- First air date: 2 May 1981

Technical information
- Transmitter coordinates: 4°49′46″N 7°4′31″E

Radio Rivers 99.1 (also known as Radio Rivers 2) is the first state-owned FM radio station in Rivers State, and the second FM radio station to launch in Nigeria. It is run by Rivers State Broadcasting Corporation (RSBC) and operates on 99.1 Megahertz. The station first signed on the air on Saturday 2 May 1981.

Radio Rivers FM broadcasting studio is located along Degema Street in the heart of the old Port Harcourt township commonly referred to as 'Town'. The station's transmitters are based in the Port Harcourt neighborhood of Elelenwo from where it transmits to various towns and municipalities of the state and beyond.

== Programming ==
Radio Rivers has a broad range of programming. This includes news and information (particularly on the native ethnic groups of Rivers State who don't receive wider coverage on other stations), local sport, music, arts and culture and public announcements. It is the only major radio station existing that is devoted to promoting Riverians and their local vernacular languages.

== See also ==
- List of radio stations in Port Harcourt
- Rivers State Television
