= Ash Merlyn International School =

Location
- 1 Victory Estate; Elelenwo, Port Harcourt, Rivers State; Nigeria

Information
- Type: Private
- Motto: Building global champions
- Established: September 2011; 14 years ago
- Status: Open
- Principal: Austin Daniel.
- Teaching staff: 80
- Gender: Mixed
- Age: 3 to 14
- Campus type: Urban
- Colours: White and grey
- Website: www.ashmerlynintsch.com

Ash Merlyn International School is located in Elelenwo, Port Harcourt, Rivers State. It is a private mixed school serving pupils aged 3 to 11. The school website is: www.ashmerlynintsch.com. The school was founded in September 2011 and is focused on "Building global champions".
