= Rivers State Fire Service =

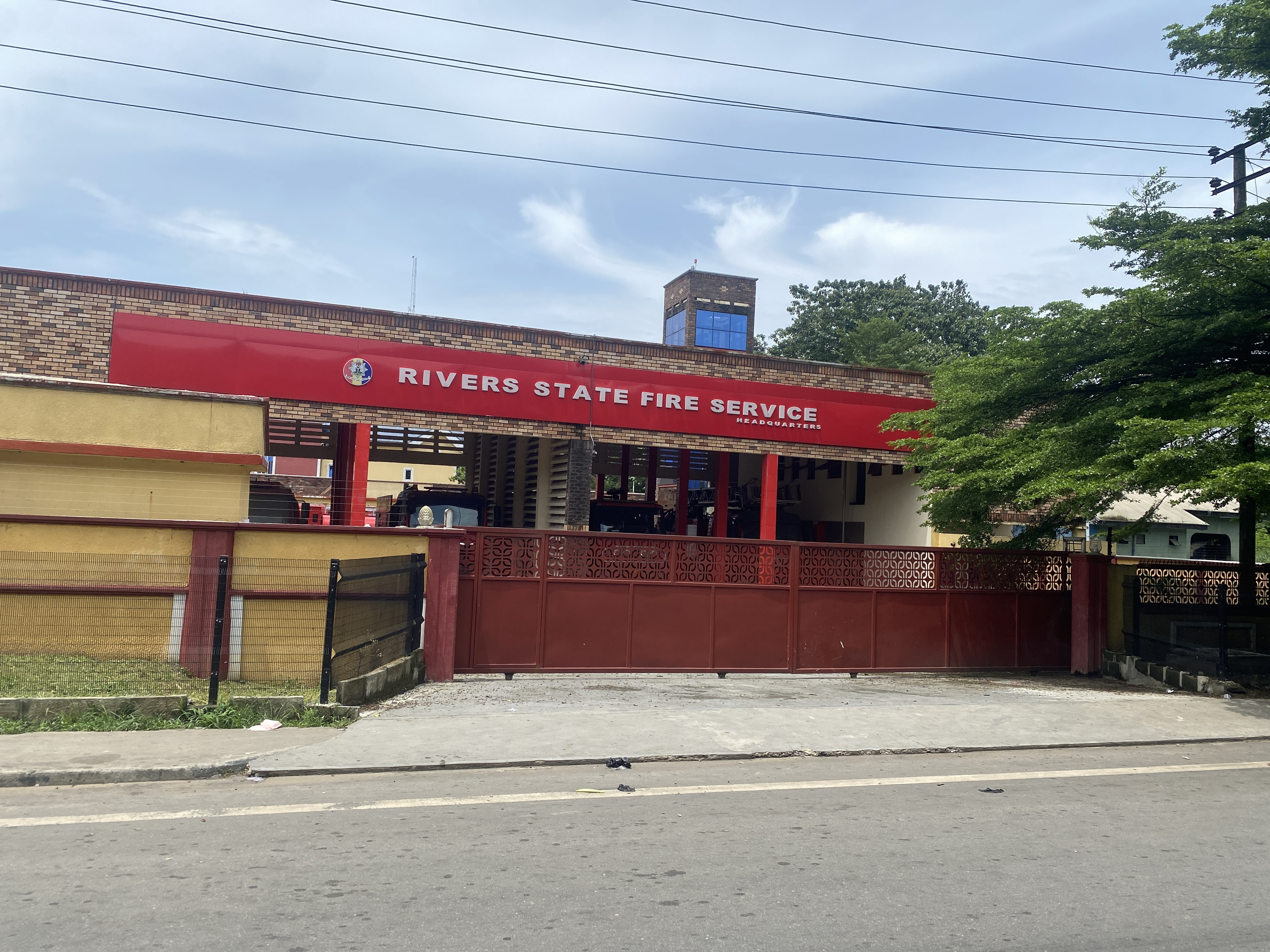

The Rivers State Fire Service is the state-owned firefighting body in Rivers State, Nigeria, primarily tasked with providing fire protection, emergency response and safety services to the state, its residents and visitors. The Fire Service has stations located at Borokiri (in Port Harcourt), Degema, Ahoada and Rumuodomaya. Its activities are overseen by the Rivers State Ministry of Special Duties. In 2009, the value of property saved in 85 fire incidents across the state accounted for ₦6.7 billion.

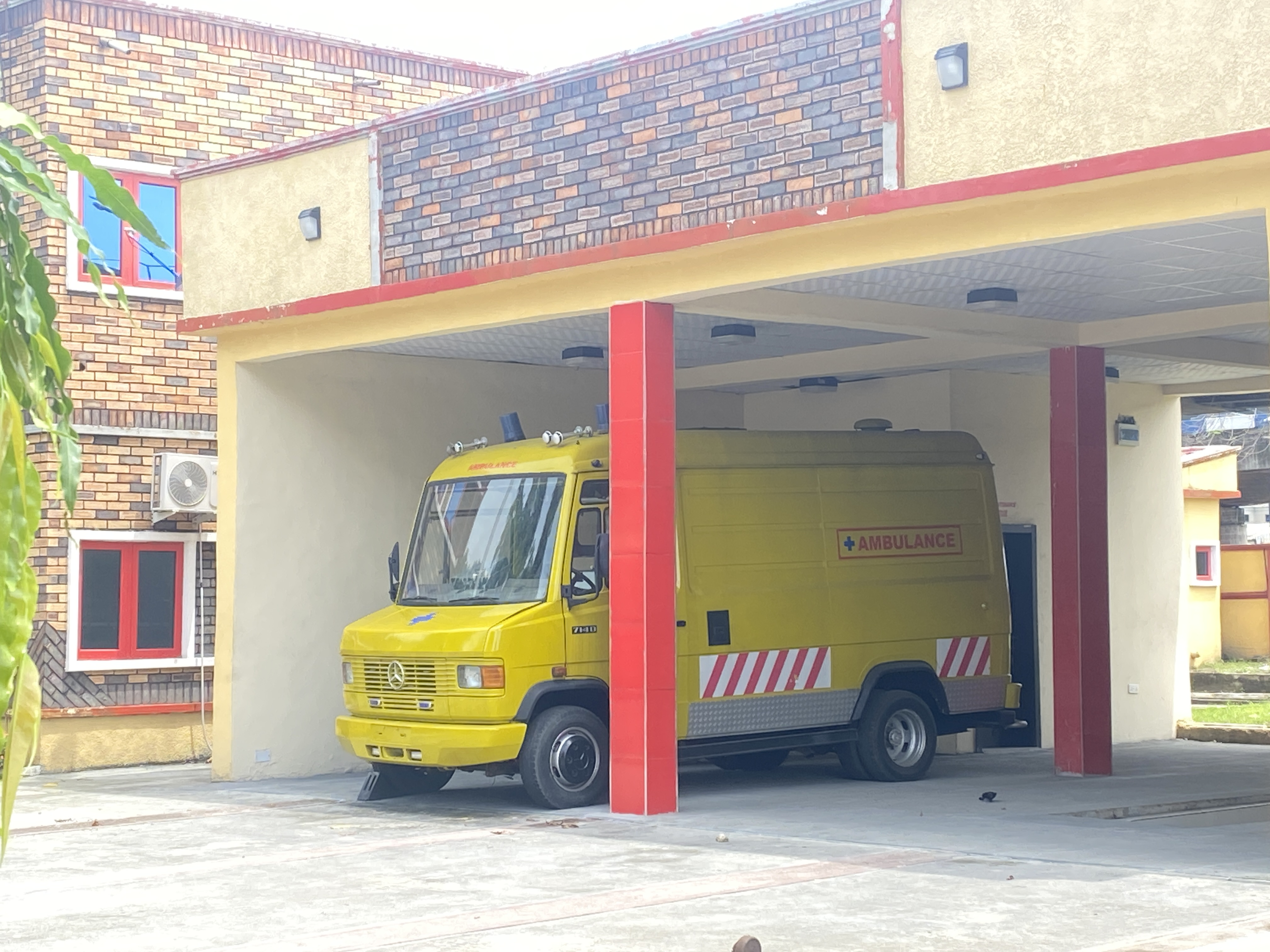

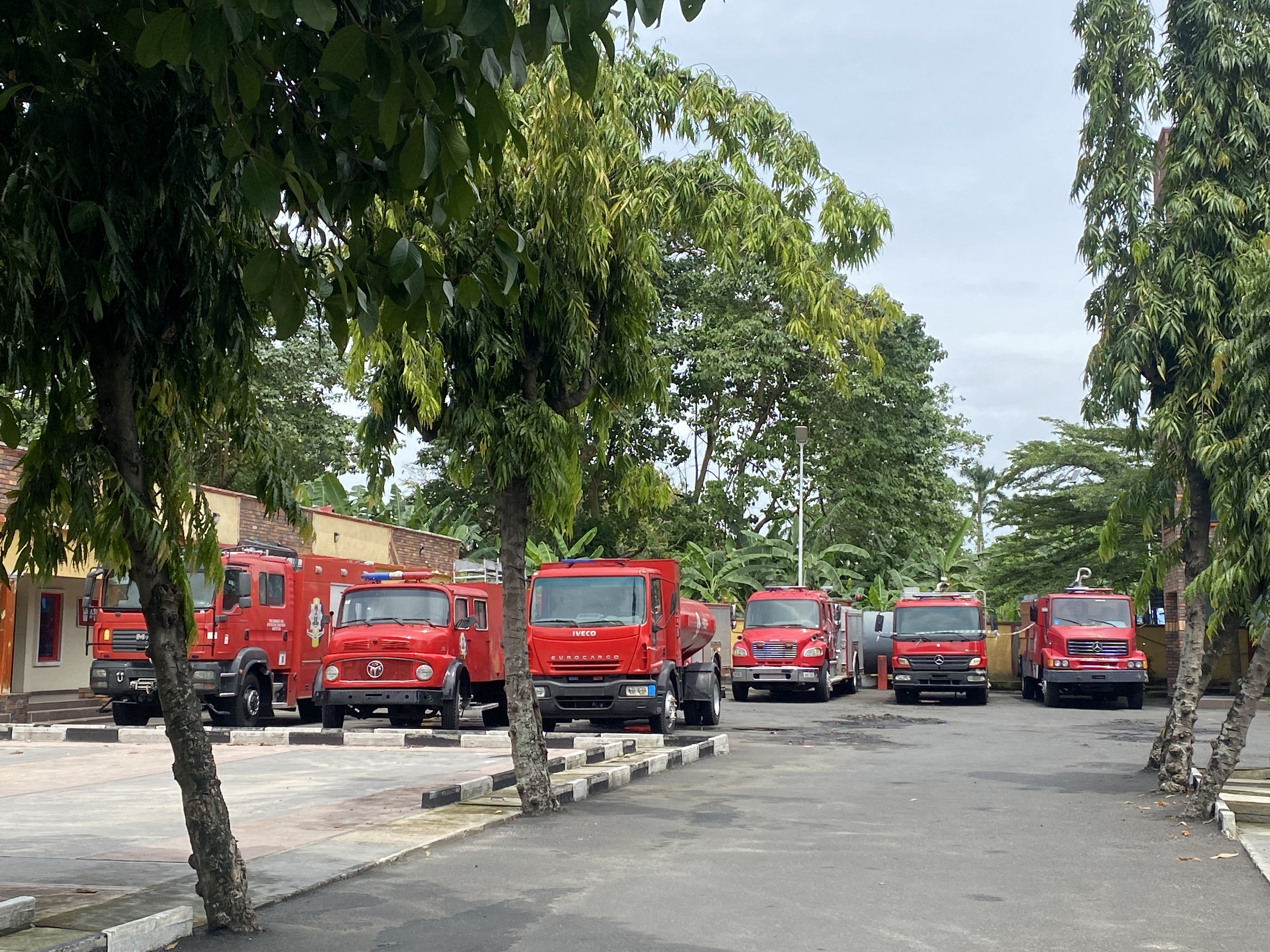

== See also ==
- Rivers State Ministry of Special Duties
- Rivers State Police
