= Rivers State Ministry of Special Duties =

Nigerian government agency

The Rivers State Ministry of Special Duties is a ministry of the Government of Rivers State, which develops methods for risk reduction and disaster management. To achieve its goal, the ministry outfits the fire service and emergency management departments with a reliable infrastructure. The current incumbent commissioner is Mr. Bariere Thomas.

== Ministry objectives ==
The vision and policy objectives of the Ministry of Special Duties are:

To bring about relief to distress people and situation.

To extend fire service facilities to the grassroot.

To have a safer, sustainable and resilient society.

== Mandate ==
The ministry’s mandate is to respond to emergencies and provide aid to the victims.

== See also ==
- Rivers State Fire Service
- Government of Rivers State
