= Rivers State Road Traffic Management Authority =

Rivers State Road Traffic and Management Authority (TIMA-RIV)
- Company type: Government agency
- Founded: 2009
- Founder: Government of Rivers State
- Headquarters: 4 Moscow Road, Old GRA, Port Harcourt
- Area served: Rivers State, Nigeria
- Key people: Dr.Confidence Obinna Eke (Comptroller General), Formerly the Sector Head of Training, Rivers State Sector Command of the Federal Road Safety Corps, Nigeria's lead agency in Road Safety Law Enforcement.Currently, Confidence Obinna Eke is the Chairperson of Driving Schools and Safety Alliance Africa -DSSAA.
- Services: Road Safety, Traffic Regulation and Transport Policy
- Parent: Ministry of Transport
- Website: www.timariv.gov.ng

The Rivers State Road Traffic Management Authority (abbreviated TIMA-RIV) is a government corporation that handles matters relating to road safety, traffic management and transportation in Rivers State. It was set up under the Road Traffic Law No.6 of 2009. Its headquarters are in Port Harcourt. The corporation has an affiliation with the State Ministry of Transport. The Comptroller General heading its operations is appointed by the Governor.

== Functions ==
The Road Traffic Law 2009 empowers the Corporation to carry out amongst other functions the duties to:

1. Control of traffic and enforce state laws relating to the safe use of vehicles on the road.
2. Deter road users from the commission of road traffic offences and apprehend road traffic offenders.
3. Conduct highly visible day and night traffic patrols to enforce traffic rules and regulations and clear highway of obstruction.
4. Enforce the use of bus stops and bus terminals.

== See also ==
- List of government agencies of Rivers State
