= Norwegian International School (Port Harcourt) =

School in Port Harcourt, Nigeria

Coordinates: 4°49′13″N 6°59′28″E

- New GRA, Port Harcourt, Rivers State; Nigeria

Information
- Established: 1983; 43 years ago
- Age: 2 to 16
- Website: nisng.com

Norwegian International School (abbreviated NIS) is located at New GRA, Port Harcourt. It was set up in 1983 to cater to the educational needs of expatriate children from Bulkcem Cement Company. The school first operated with two teachers and approximately twelve students but has since grown with children from other companies attending it. Currently, the school serves nursery through secondary, ages 2 through 16.

== Curriculum ==
The school's curriculum comprises elements of the English National Curriculum, alongside the curricular standards of the Cambridge International Primary Programme (CIPP) and the International General Certificate of Secondary Education (IGCSE).
