= Caught in the Act (Didirri album) =

Studio album by Didirri
- Released: 4 August 2023
- Recorded: 2021–2022
- Length: 40:16
- Label: Liberation
- Producer: Robert Muiños; Didirri

Didirri chronology
Sold for Sale (2020)	Caught in the Act (2023)

Caught in the Act is the debut album by Australian singer-songwriter Didirri, released on 4 August 2023 through Liberation Music. It follows his EPs Measurements (2018) and Sold for Sale (2020). The album was produced by Robert Muiños and Didirri and recorded in Melbourne during 2021 and 2022. It was preceded by the singles "Begin Again", "Obsolete Machine" and "You Know What's Good for You".

== Critical reception ==
Bryget Chrisfield of Beat Magazine described the album as "transportive, introspective, vulnerable, intimate, enchanting and deceptively unassuming" and wrote that it "captures this exceptional Warrnambool-raised singer-songwriter on the cusp of a breakthrough. And not to minimise the understated elegance of this record, but it also has the makings of a top-notch makeout soundtrack".

== Track listing ==
Caught in the Act track listing
No.	Title	Length
1.	"Obsolete Machine"	3:29
2.	"Often Broken"	3:42
3.	"Tonight"	3:45
4.	"I Wanted It Easier Than This"	4:10
5.	"Heaving Chest"	3:53
6.	"Begin Again"	3:24
7.	"Winning Moves"	4:00
8.	"You Know What's Good for You"	3:00
9.	"Love Can Bleed You by the Hand"	3:16
10.	"Under Falling Skies"	3:16
11.	"Numb"	4:22
Total length:		40:16

== Charts ==
Chart performance for Caught in the Act
Chart (2023)	Peak position
Australian Artist Albums (ARIA)	16
Australian Vinyl Albums (ARIA)	5
