= Frasier season 10 =

Frasier
- Season 10
- DVD cover
- Showrunner: Dan O'Shannon
- Starring: Kelsey Grammer; Jane Leeves; David Hyde Pierce; Peri Gilpin; John Mahoney
- No. of episodes: 24

Release
- Original network: NBC
- Original release: September 24, 2002 – May 20, 2003

Season chronology
- ← Previous; Season 9 Next → Season 11

The tenth season of the American television sitcom Frasier aired on NBC from September 24, 2002 to May 20, 2003.

== Cast ==
=== Main ===
- Kelsey Grammer as Frasier Crane
- Jane Leeves as Daphne Crane
- David Hyde Pierce as Niles Crane
- Peri Gilpin as Roz Doyle
- John Mahoney as Martin Crane

=== Special appearance by ===
- Bob Hoskins as Coach Fuller
- Elvis Costello as Ben
- Phil McGraw as Himself

=== Special guest ===
- Bebe Neuwirth as Lilith
- Dan Butler as Bulldog
- Harriet Sansom Harris as Bebe Glazer
- Millicent Martin as Gertrude Moon
- Saul Rubinek as Donny
- Ana Gasteyer as Trish
- Dean Cain as Rick
- Felicity Huffman as Julia Wilcox
- Brent Spiner as Albert
- Jeanne Tripplehorn as Chelsea
- Alan Cumming as Ahmrit
- John Hannah as Avery McManus
- David Ogden Stiers as Leland Barton

=== Recurring ===
- Patrick Kerr as Noel
- Tom McGowan as Kenny
- Ashley Thomas as Alice
- Edward Hibbert as Gil Chesterton

=== Guest ===
- Sam Johnson as Reno Officiant
- Conrad Janis as Albert
- Zooey Deschanel as Jen
- Trevor Einhorn as Frederick
- Hal Sparks as Receptionist
- Sarah Shahi as Reservationist
- Mike Judge as Van
- Paul F. Tompkins as Patient
- Harve Presnell as Mike Shaw
- Ann Cusack as Antonia
- Dale Dickey as Mrs. Grant
- Alex Borstein as Evelyn
- David Alan Basche as Woody Wizwell

== Episodes ==
No. overall	No. in season	Title	Directed by	Written by	Original release date	Prod. code	U.S. viewers (millions)
217	1	"The Ring Cycle"	Kelsey Grammer	Jon Sherman	September 24, 2002	1001	21.12
Unable to wait any longer, Daphne and Niles hasten to a casino in Reno in the middle of the night and get married secretly. Roz finds out when she tries to phone Daphne during the night. On returning to Seattle, Niles and Daphne are eager to break the good news to Frasier and Martin, until they discover that both would be devastated if they had missed the ceremony. To spare their feelings, Niles and Daphne pretend that they are not yet married, and that the wedding is in three days at the courthouse. Unfortunately, on the day Daphne's mother objects to a civil ceremony, and Daphne agrees to wait until they find a church and a minister. However, once Gertrude has gone, she changes her mind again and they proceed with the civil ceremony without her. Later on, Gertrude apologises to Daphne, saying that as long as she is able to attend the wedding, it does not matter where it is held. Niles and Daphne therefore feel obliged to go through the whole process a third time for her benefit, but by this time their personal vows are becoming less significant, and less memorable, with an awkward encounter with Donny to top it off. The excuses all comes out at the third wedding, with everyone furious at the lies except for Martin, who instead tells the newlyweds to go out on their honeymoon. Daphne finally calls him by his first name.
218	2	"Enemy at the Gate"	Kelsey Grammer	Lori Kirkland	October 1, 2002	1005	14.50
While driving Niles to return a birdcage, on the way to KACL, Frasier turns his BMW into a multi-storey car park and takes a ticket. Suddenly realising that his show starts in fifteen minutes, he promptly drives round to the exit gate and explains to the attendant, George (Luis Guzman), that he decided not to park. George insists he still pay $2, which is the standard charge for any portion of 20 minutes. Frasier objects on principle to paying when he has not parked, but when George refuses to let him out without paying, he decides to stay and get his money's worth, sitting in his car which is blocking the exit to all other motorists. Niles agrees that he is right to be frustrated, but tries to discourage his brother from his "peaceful protest.” Eventually, 20 minutes passes and Frasier pays $2. However, because he took time making a long speech he now owes $4. He then tells Niles to "hold on" and proceeds to drive through the barrier. Niles returns later at night and pays for the damage. Roz is compelled to start the show at KACL without him, and one careless remark while answering a caller's problem leads to the entire station discovering that she slept with Frasier. Meanwhile, it's a sad day in the Crane household as Daphne finishes moving out and Martin realizes just how much he's going to miss not having her around all the time. Guest Callers: Billy Bean as Jerry; Charles Busch as Mark; Leelee Sobieski as Unnamed Caller
219	3	"Proxy Prexy"	Cynthia J. Popp	Chris Marcil	October 8, 2002	1002	14.28
When Frasier fails to become President of the Elliott Bay Towers’ Condo Board, he decides to use Martin as a candidate, while secretly pulling the strings. Meanwhile, a verbal misunderstanding leads Roz to think Niles and Daphne are asking her to join them in a threesome, resulting in days of teasing.
220	4	"Kissing Cousin"	Scott Ellis	Eric Zicklin	October 15, 2002	1006	13.82
Roz receives a visit from her twentysomething cousin, Jen (Zooey Deschanel), who typifies her age group (according to Niles) on account of her endless cynicism about everything. She also parties very hard, and since she has always looked up to Roz as the only exciting person in her home town, Roz feels obliged to maintain this image by joining her cousin at clubs until the small hours. However, Roz is not as young as she used to be, and the lack of sleep starts to take its toll. Frasier finds Jen's opinionated attitude intolerable, especially when she expresses her negative views on Sigmund Freud. Rather surprisingly, the person she experiences the best connection with is Kenny, who is impressed by her plan to travel to Vietnam. Meanwhile, now that Daphne is no longer their housekeeper, Frasier and Martin find it difficult to keep the apartment tidy and soon begin to take advantage of her goodwill. Guest Caller: Bradley Whitford as Stu
221	5	"Tales from the Crypt"	David Lee	Saladin K. Patterson	October 29, 2002	1003	12.72
Halloween has come round again. Bulldog is bathed in glory after playing a practical joke on Frasier by replacing his BMW with a replica that had been smashed up. Frasier is humiliated and determined to get his revenge. His initial plan involves using a red balloon to cause Bulldog gradual psychological distress, but meets with scorn when he explains it to Roz. He then decides to set up a terrifying scene in the KACL basement where Bulldog is working now, involving actors dressed as zombies. Martin and Roz help with the preparations, but they both agree that practical jokes are not Frasier's strong point, so this is bound to fail. After some thought, Frasier realises one way in which he can stage the greatest practical joke ever, even if it means changing direction in his plan. Meanwhile, Gertrude Moon challenges a child named Jason (who was also the main trick-or-treater, in Frasier's building in past seasons) who comes to Niles' apartment trick-or-treating. This leads to a childish prank war between the two; when Niles, Daphne, and Jason's parents step in, though, the two team up to play jokes on them.
222	6	"Star Mitzvah"	Sheldon Epps	Sam Johnson	November 5, 2002	1008	11.62
Frederick's (Trevor Einhorn) bar mitzvah is a couple of days away and Lilith is emotionally reminiscing about his childhood. When going through the guest list, Lilith finds that Freddy has invited as many guests as he could, in order to get more gifts. She embarrasses him by crying during her speech. Frasier in the meantime wants to give a speech about Freddie in Hebrew. Noel Shemsky, his co-worker, agrees to teach him in return for a favor. When Frasier fails to fulfill his end of the deal Noel teaches him the speech in Klingon. Later when Frasier sends him a thoughtful apology gift, Noel attempts to call Frasier to tell him what he did but Frasier's phone is off. Frederick is already embarrassed enough through Lilith crying and the revelation his middle name is 'Gaylord', so Frasier's speech can only make things worse.
223	7	"Bristle While You Work"	Sheldon Epps	Tom Reeder	November 12, 2002	1009	17.26
Frasier is looking for a new housekeeper, and his high standards and demanding nature make the search particularly difficult. Eventually, he, Martin and Daphne interview a woman named Trish Haney (Ana Gasteyer), who arrives late, causing Frasier to worry about how seriously she will take the job. Martin, however, thinks she will be good company for him during the day, so is keen that she be given the job. Frasier is reluctant, but concedes since he'd only hired Daphne at Martin's insistence. Unfortunately, his predictions prove to be accurate when Trish repeatedly disappears early from work for no good reason, or misses days altogether. Martin, anxious not to have his mistake known, is compelled to clean the apartment in her place, so that Frasier never realises she is not doing the work. Niles has a persistent toothache, and the dentist has assured him that there is nothing wrong with it. Roz suggests a sinus infection, and although he hopes she is right, Niles also considers the distant possibility that he is experiencing referred pain. Over the next few days, he has several very unlikely experiences, such as winning competitions from bottle tops, flipping a coin that consistently lands tails up, and having his car struck by lightning. He becomes more and more worried by these apparent omens, and eventually decides to consult a doctor, who discovers a serious abnormality in his EKG. Niles says he can clear his schedule and check himself into the hospital the next afternoon, but the doctor insists that he go immediately.
224	8	"Rooms with a View"	Kelsey Grammer	Dan O'Shannon & Lori Kirkland & Bob Daily	November 19, 2002	1007	18.33
Niles has been taken to hospital, and is about to undergo heart surgery. Daphne, Frasier, Martin and Roz have all come to see him, and each is coping differently: Martin jovially pretends there is no problem, and that Niles is just avoiding work; Frasier has researched the medical procedure thoroughly, and keeps offering to talk everyone through it; Daphne is just terrified, and Roz does her best to look after her. Frasier irritates the surgeon by asking questions about the operation, and by suggesting that he knows a better way of doing it, just because his source is a colleague from Harvard. Niles, on his way to the operating room, speculates over whether a hospital has memories. Then, at several points while the others wait for the operation to finish, little scenes from their past are played out around them in different parts of the hospital, including when Niles was born, when Roz brought baby Alice in for a check-up, and when Martin received bad news about his wife's health. Once Niles' surgery is over and a relieved Daphne leaves the hospital, the hospital shows a hopeful future scene in which she and Niles welcome a second child.
225	9	"Don't Go Breaking My Heart"	Jerry Zaks	Bob Daily	November 26, 2002	1010	14.67
When Niles was in the hospital and about to undergo his operation, Frasier made a pact with God that, in return for Niles’ safe passage, he would cherish all their time together. Niles emerges from hospital with renewed joie de vivre, although persists with his post-operative diet and physical restraint, even after the doctor gives him the all-clear, and this proves frustrating for Daphne. He also spends so much time talking about his near-death experience that it begins to annoy everyone else, particularly Frasier. However, he refuses to get drawn into arguments, fearing the wrath of a vengeful God. Once Frasier discovers that Daphne made a similar pact with God that supersedes his, and is holding up her end, he feels freed to reengage Niles in their usual verbal sparring. It takes a talking-to from Martin to get Niles to realize that he's been holding back from resuming his normal activities out of fear, and he rushes home to his wife ready to get back to his life. His heart is put to the test when he accidentally climbs into bed with Gertrude, confirming that if he can survive her, he can survive anything. Guest Caller: John Turturro as Grant
226	10	"We Two Kings"	Jerry Zaks	Patricia Breen	December 10, 2002	1011	13.77
Christmas is approaching, and everyone is in a festive mood. Roz is working at the Mall as "Snowflake", one of Santa’s elves, and actually has her eye on Santa (Dean Cain) himself, even though she has yet to see him without the costume. Meanwhile, having dispatched Mrs. Moon on a cruise, Niles and Daphne invite Frasier and Martin to their place for Christmas. However, Frasier had already been making extensive plans for a family celebration at his apartment, and this leads to an argument between the brothers. Martin eventually loses patience with them and decides to work over Christmas. Hating the idea of spending Christmas without their father, Frasier and Niles apologize and organise a surprise for him, but not everything goes according to plan. A mix-up with the presents and a last-minute schedule change leaves the entire family locked out of the building where Martin works, staring in at the presents Frasier and Niles put around its Christmas tree.
227	11	"Door Jam"	Scott Ellis	Heide Perlman	January 7, 2003	1004	12.00
Owing to an item of misdirected mail, Frasier learns of a very exclusive new spa in Seattle called La Porte d’Argent. When he discovers that membership is strictly by invitation only, he persuades Niles to masquerade as Cam Winston (whose name IS on the list) to get past the receptionist. Once inside, they find the service expensive but excellent, and are quite contented until they discover that there is an even more exclusive gold membership. Roz calls in a favor to get the brothers admitted, and they enjoy the luxurious pampering – until they notice yet another door, completely unguarded. Believing it to be the entrance to an even higher level of membership, they sneak through only to find themselves locked out of the spa in its garbage-strewn back alley. At the same time, Martin and Daphne are struggling to bond after she became his daughter-in-law, finding a common fondness of old television shows like M*A*S*H.
228	12	"The Harassed"	Kelsey Grammer	Chris Marcil	January 14, 2003	1014	12.40
KACL has hired a new financial analyst and former CNBC employee, Julia Wilcox (Felicity Huffman), to give stock market updates in the final ten minutes of Frasier’s show. Kenny is anxious that everyone should treat her well, as she sued her previous employer for wrongful dismissal, but Frasier finds her dismissive and condescending despite all his attempts to be friendly. His family, colleagues at work, and even some listeners, suspect chemistry between Frasier and Julia, which he initially denies. Then, during a heated argument, he mistakes her hostility for attraction, and this causes nothing but trouble. Meanwhile, Niles is facing problems holding therapy sessions at his home.
229	13	"Lilith Needs a Favor"	Sheldon Epps	Lori Kirkland	February 4, 2003	1016	14.89
On a plane, Lilith is talking to a man just as pale-looking as she. His name is Albert (Brent Spiner). She explains to him that she is traveling to Seattle to ask an old friend for a favor. In Seattle, Lilith approaches Frasier with a very unusual request: she wants his sperm to conceive another child. She convinces him to let her do it, reminding him of Freddy’s childhood. At the sperm bank, Frasier and Lilith finally agree that all she wanted to do was recapture Frederick’s childhood. He convinces her otherwise, and the two leave on good terms once again. Whilst Frasier has been enveloped with Lilith's request, Daphne takes her mother, Roz, and Alice to a Canadian theme park. She left Niles with a collection of photographs, telling him to make note of the final photograph. Niles and Frasier struggle to decipher it. A waiter at the cafe points out that it is of a nipple and Niles then believes it is Daphne's and carries it out with him wherever he goes. However, Daphne phones Niles on her return journey and reveals the nipple in the photograph actually belongs to Martin. As the episode is ending, Lilith is on a plane back to Boston. She meets Albert again, who reveals himself to be a divorced scientist. After a few minutes of conversation, it is implicit that the two have much in common, and may pursue a relationship.
230	14	"Daphne Does Dinner"	Katy Garretson	Heide Perlman	February 11, 2003	1013	12.78
The Crane brothers have a history of disastrous dinner parties, and the episode opens with one such occasion, just as all the guests and caterers are walking out. Niles is donating a painting by artist Mike Shaw to a museum, and plans to hold a farewell dinner party for it, with some fellow art collectors in attendance. When Daphne learns of this, she persuades him to co-host the party with her, not his brother. Frasier is upset, but offers his services in case they are needed. Consequently, when Daphne’s cooking starts to go wrong at the last minute, and the painting suffers after an encounter with Alice and her crayons, Frasier agrees to help, as long as Niles is unaware of his presence. The situation becomes more complicated by the minute as the guests arrive, particularly when the artist turns up unexpectedly (and Martin is misidentified) and Daphne's mother takes a shine to him.
231	15	"Trophy Girlfriend"	Kelsey Grammer	Saladin K. Patterson	February 18, 2003	1015	12.80
It's time for the Crane brothers sports club squash tournament, and Frasier is expecting to be teamed with Niles again but he has other ideas: as they have been eliminated in the second round for nine years in a row, Niles has decided to team up with Jim Braggett (Jack Brewer) in hopes of doing better. Understandably, Frasier is upset at his brother's actions but luck is at hand when Chelsea Gray (Jeanne Tripplehorn), a girls' gym teacher, walks into the room. She and Frasier briefly met some time ago and mentions that she is looking for someone to team up with her for the mixed doubles. Frasier is reluctant initially but when he sees her hit a great ball at Jim he agrees. This decision pays off handsomely when Chelsea and Frasier win the mixed doubles tournament. This delights Martin as his son has finally brought home a trophy that doesn't have a book on it, while Niles is a bit jealous of his brother's achievements and hopes he can do just as well with Jim. Frasier also admits to Daphne that he has developed a bit of a crush on Chelsea and is worried that she doesn't feel the same way, but Daphne manages to convince him to take the plunge and he is rewarded with a date with Chelsea. After the relationship has stabilized, Niles tells Frasier that he first he couldn't believe he was dating a gym teacher on account of their dreadful experiences they both faced when they were at school but remarks that Chelsea couldn't be more different. Frasier also enjoys Chelsea, but things change when he goes to pick her up at her school and watches the woman berate a heavyset girl for not trying hard enough to climb the rope. It triggers memories of Frasier's horrible cigar-smoking gym teacher Coach Fuller (Bob Hoskins) and as a result he can no longer look at Chelsea without seeing her as his former gym teacher.
232	16	"Fraternal Schwinns"	Sheldon Epps	Sam Johnson	February 25, 2003	1017	13.05
When a bike-a-thon for charity is organized by KACL, Frasier and Niles must come to terms with the fact that neither can ride a bicycle. So it falls on Daphne to teach them. Meanwhile, Martin runs into Cora Winston again and learns that Daphne’s mother is responsible for the demise of their brief relationship.
233	17	"Kenny on the Couch"	David Lee	Bob Daily	March 4, 2003	1018	12.09
Kenny's divorce has been made final, and he is feeling depressed. Frasier suggests he seek professional help, and is eventually persuaded to take on the job himself. He actually finds it thrilling to return to private practice. However, after one evening out drinking at McGinty's with Martin, Kenny is already feeling better and wants to give up the therapy, much to Frasier's dismay. Meanwhile, Niles and Daphne have started yoga, and Niles is somewhat dispirited to discover that his wife is "outperforming him". Guest Caller: Laura Linney as Mindy
234	18	"Roe to Perdition"	Jerry Zaks	Jon Sherman	March 18, 2003	1012	9.42
While shopping for ingredients for an at-home soirée, Frasier and Niles are outraged by the price of Beluga caviar. Their protests are overheard by a rather shady-looking individual, who claims to them that the Russian Mafia control the market and keep the prices up. He also says he can supply high-quality caviar at more reasonable prices, and after tasting one sample the brothers are more than convinced. The guests at their party are also very impressed, and all sorts of social opportunities start opening up for Frasier and Niles in return for supplying the caviar. Roz helps with the transactions in return for a share, and becomes gradually fixated to the point of addiction. However, their supplier becomes worried that too many orders draw attention, and stops making deliveries. Determined not to lose their social advantages, the Cranes decide to track down the Caspian Queen, the Russian ship which brought the caviar to the USA. Unfortunately, Customs are on the same trail. Meanwhile, Martin has been overpaid by a cash machine, and Daphne insists that he return the extra money to the bank and clear his conscience, but they find the process surprisingly complicated.
235	19	"Some Assembly Required"	Wil Shriner	Patricia Breen	April 1, 2003	1020	9.25
A team of volunteers from KACL have helped build a house for the charity "Housing for Humanity", and although Frasier’s contributions were modest he is still proud of them. In fact, he sees it as his right to call round the house several times once the Grant family has moved in, to advise them on how to decorate the place. At first they treat this as an honour, but it quickly becomes a conflict between their very different tastes, and Roz decides to intervene. After a heated argument, Daphne’s mother has started working at Café Nervosa in an attempt to make her daughter feel guilty, but Daphne is not prepared to be manipulated. Martin and Eddie become a sensational safety act at a local primary school, at least until Martin is taken ill and Niles is forced to stand in at the last minute.
236	20	"Farewell, Nervosa"	Kelsey Grammer	Eric Zicklin	April 22, 2003	1019	9.30
Frasier has hired an old friend from his Oxford days, Avery McManus (John Hannah), as his accountant, and his spending habits are already causing some concern. Following a difficult meeting, Frasier seeks sanctuary in Café Nervosa with Niles, only to discover that they now have a loud folk singer named Ben (Elvis Costello) playing afternoons. Frasier voices his objections, but ends up crossing the establishment owner, Maureen Nervosa (Amy Hill), and in the end feels compelled to leave. He and Niles spend some time trying, unsuccessfully, to find an alternative regular café. During his search, he is shocked to discover Julia Wilcox, a condescending co-worker from KACL, in the arms of his accountant. Knowing that Avery is married, Frasier is faced with an ethical dilemma as to whether he should tell Julia this fact. Niles, meanwhile, is unable to keep away from Nervosa.
237	21	"The Devil and Dr. Phil"	Wil Shriner	Sam Johnson & Chris Marcil	April 29, 2003	1022	11.08
Frasier encounters his old acquaintance Dr. Phil McGraw. Unfortunately, Frasier's one enduring memory is that Dr. Phil won $200 from him in a card game. Everyone else, especially Roz, admires him greatly for his television broadcasts. Frasier also makes the astonishing discovery that his former agent, Bebe Glazer, is now working for Dr. Phil. She, however, now has plans for persuading Frasier to return as her client, and will use any methods at her disposal to achieve her aim.
238	22	"Fathers and Sons"	Kelsey Grammer	Jon Sherman	May 6, 2003	1024	10.89
Frasier and his family receive a visit from Dr. Leland Barton (David Ogden Stiers), his late mother's research assistant, now settled in Paris. They find him sophisticated and erudite, with an interest in sherry and the arts – in short, surprisingly similar to Frasier and Niles. Roz even observes that they have some similar mannerisms, and when Leland confides in her how close he was to their mother, she cannot help considering the possibility that the similarities are more than just a coincidence. Martin makes some similar observations, and begins to feel unsettled by the thought. Niles and Daphne are also thinking about parenting, and although there are no children on the way yet, Niles is keen to get a place in advance at a decent kindergarten. The problem is that they have to put a name on the form.
239	23	"Analyzed Kiss"	Katy Garretson	Saladin K. Patterson & Heide Perlman	May 13, 2003	1023	10.42
Julia has finished her affair with Frasier's accountant, Avery, and is vacillating between depression and anger. Frasier offers his support, even despite her determination to break into Avery’s office and cause chaos. During this escapade, they are forced to hide in a closet to avoid detection, and Frasier is surprised when Julia kisses him. She insists it was to keep him quiet, but he believes there must be more to it, and spends days trying to persuade Julia to talk it over with him. He also has to come to terms with the possibility that Roz may be leaving KACL, as she has been offered a job at another radio station as a program director. She in turn is worried because it appears she may have encountered the interviewer before, romantically. Meanwhile, Niles has discovered an unexpected enthusiasm for firearms. Guest Caller: Bill Paxton as Ernie
240	24	"A New Position for Roz"	Kelsey Grammer	Lori Kirkland	May 20, 2003	1021	11.47
Roz is preparing to leave KACL to take a job as program director at another station. Noel has been delegated as her replacement, which is not a decision in which Frasier has much confidence. The station organises a going-away party for Roz, at which she becomes so emotional that she changes her mind and decides to stay after all. However, Frasier is now forming a new relationship with Julia, which makes Roz very uncomfortable, and though she claims this is just because it is a mismatch, the reasoning is not convincing to Julia. Meanwhile, Niles and Daphne are dreaming of starting their own family, but Daphne is determined to get rid of her mother before they do. After Daphne's mother leaves, Daphne breaks down in tears and Niles convinces Daphne's mother to live in her own apartment. Roz gives Frasier an ultimatum to choose her or Julia, with Frasier choosing the latter. Heartbroken, Roz quits KACL and takes up her new position.
