= Cita Morei =

Palauan activist

- Born: Elicita Morei
- Known for: Women's liberation and anti-nuclear weapons activism
- Mother: Gabriela Ngirmang

Elicita 'Cita' Morei is a Palauan women's liberation and anti-nuclear weapons activist and writer. She is a member of the Belauan women's organization, Otil a Beluad and author of Belau Be Brave and Planting the Mustard Seed of World Peace.

Morei is also an active campaigner for the preservation of the land in the Pacific island of Palau.

== Personal ==
Morei is the daughter of anti-nuclear campaigner and leader of Otil a Beluad Gabriela Ngirmang.
