= Frasier season 11 =

Frasier
- Season 11
- DVD cover
- Showrunners: Christopher Lloyd; Joe Keenan
- Starring: Kelsey Grammer; Jane Leeves; David Hyde Pierce; Peri Gilpin; John Mahoney
- No. of episodes: 24

Release
- Original network: NBC
- Original release: September 23, 2003 – May 13, 2004

Season chronology
- ← Previous; Season 10 Next → 2023 revival

The eleventh and final season of the American sitcom Frasier aired on NBC from September 23, 2003 to May 13, 2004.

== Cast ==
=== Main ===
- Kelsey Grammer as Frasier Crane
- Jane Leeves as Daphne Crane
- David Hyde Pierce as Niles Crane
- Peri Gilpin as Roz Doyle
- John Mahoney as Martin Crane

=== Special guest ===
- Bebe Neuwirth as Lilith
- Dan Butler as Bulldog
- Harriet Sansom Harris as Bebe Glazer
- Millicent Martin as Mrs. Moon
- Felicity Huffman as Julia
- Patrick Stewart as Alistair
- Wendie Malick as Ronee
- Julia Sweeney as Ann
- Dan Castellaneta as Brad
- Penny Johnson Jerald as Carol
- Valerie Mahaffey as Peggy
- Missi Pyle as Shannon
- Sarah Silverman as Jane
- Laurie Metcalf as Nanny G
- Estelle Parsons as Opal
- Laura Linney as Charlotte (Note: Also credited in the special appearance bill in "Goodnight, Seattle: Part 2")
- Jennifer Tilly as Kim
- Rosie Perez as Lizbeth
- Anthony LaPaglia as Simon Moon
- Robbie Coltrane as Michael Moon
- Richard E. Grant as Stephen Moon
- Jennifer Beals as Dr. Anne Ranberg

=== Recurring ===
- Patrick Kerr as Noel Shempsky
- Tom McGowan as Kenny
- Ashley Thomas as Alice
- Edward Hibbert as Gil Chesterton

=== Guest ===
- Debra Monk as Nurse Karen
- Krista Allen as Liz Wright
- T. R. Knight as Alex
- Rachael Harris as Erin
- Suzanne Cryer as Denise
- Trevor Einhorn as Frederick
- Bess Armstrong as Kelly Kirkland
- Lorraine Toussaint as Nurse
- Rachel Dratch as Horny Date
- Beth Littleford as Creationism Date
- Marian Seldes as Betty
- Chris Diamantopoulos as Steve
- Aaron Eckhart as Frank
- Celia Weston as Sue
- Stephen Root as Harbin
- Arleen Sorkin as Rachel
- Jason Biggs as Dr. Hauck

=== Guest caller ===
- Benjamin Bratt as Kevin
- Stanley Tucci as Morrie
- Penny Marshall as Celeste
- Estelle Parsons as Celeste's Mother
- Hilary Duff as Britney
- Helen Mirren as Babette

== Episodes ==
No. overall	No. in season	Title	Directed by	Written by	Original release date	Prod. code	U.S. viewers (millions)
241	1	"No Sex Please, We're Skittish"	David Lee	Bob Daily	September 23, 2003	1101	14.50
Roz quits her new job at KPXY after one day, and returns to KACL. Frasier demands to know her reasons, but without success. He is convinced that Roz has feelings for him. Niles and Daphne have decided to try for a baby. Niles once made a contribution to a sperm bank during college, but discovers that his sample was discarded due to low motility. He and Daphne anticipate a difficult time conceiving, but then discover that Daphne is already pregnant.
242	2	"A Man, a Plan and a Gal: Julia"	Kelsey Grammer	Jon Sherman	September 23, 2003	1102	14.50
Daphne is pregnant, and she and Niles are keen to make an official announcement to the family over dinner. Meanwhile, Frasier's relationship with Julia has run into difficulty, and following a conversation with his brother, Frasier decides to "commit to commitment" and resolve the problems rather than run away from them. His reconciliation with Julia ends up coinciding with Niles and Daphne’s announcement dinner, which they are compelled to relocate to Frasier’s place after their oven breaks down. They agree to let Julia stay for dinner, and even though they find her frankness and general conduct offensive, Frasier is reluctant to find fault because of his renewed commitment. Julia casually announces Daphne's pregnancy to everyone after overhearing her in the kitchen, ruining the announcement. Eventually, Julia mocks Frasier's hand towels and he breaks up with her in disgust. In the end, Frasier apologizes for allowing Julia to ruin the evening and the family celebrate Niles and Daphne's news. Peri Gilpin does not appear in this episode.
243	3	"The Doctor Is Out"	David Lee	Joe Keenan	September 30, 2003	1104	11.82
Frasier thinks that Roz's new boyfriend is gay. He follows him into a gay bar, which makes everyone think that Frasier is gay. Alistair Burke (Patrick Stewart), a high-profile gay opera director then becomes interested in Frasier, who may be too enamored with the perks of a power-couple relationship to set Alistair straight. Guest Caller: Benjamin Bratt as Kevin
244	4	"The Babysitter"	Kelsey Grammer	Jeffrey Richman	October 7, 2003	1103	11.69
While out shopping for a couch, Frasier and Niles encounter Ronee Lawrence (Wendie Malick), a former babysitter from years ago who turned down Frasier’s affections and used to tell Niles scary bedtime stories. They learn that she is now working as a singer and pianist at a local hotel. Having established also that she is divorced, Frasier takes the opportunity of inviting her round to his house for cocktails that evening. Martin is delighted to see Ronee, and soon both he and Frasier are flirting with her. They both pursue her to the Wellington Hotel to see her play, and continue competing for her attention. Frasier persuades her to duet with him, but she sings directly to Martin. As Ronee and Martin grow closer, Frasier goes through a spell of depression, and since he is due to start private psychiatry again soon, Niles becomes worried. Peri Gilpin does not appear in this episode.
245	5	"The Placeholder"	Sheldon Epps	Lori Kirkland Baker	October 14, 2003	1105	11.24
Frasier seems to have become a lonely bachelor who spends his evenings eating vegetable soup and looking after a friend's cat, Mr. Bottomsley. Dining out with the family is also now an embarrassment for him, being between two couples: Niles and Daphne, and Martin and Ronee. Roz offers to set him up with her friend, Ann (Julia Sweeney). Halfway through what he finds an insufferably dull date with Ann, Kenny appears with his attractive cousin Liz Wright (Krista Allen) who works in the arts, and offers Frasier a way out.
246	6	"I'm Listening"	Sheldon Epps	Heide Perlman	October 28, 2003	1106	11.00
Frasier overhears Ronee arranging a date with another man in a phone call. Martin’s reaction on being told is to chastise Frasier for eavesdropping, despite his protestations that it was accidental. Later, when Martin asks Ronee to go with him to a doo-wop concert and she claims to have made plans, he elicits the truth from her, and she tells him she was not under the impression their relationship was exclusive. This leads Martin to pretend he also has another woman, called Sheila.
247	7	"Maris Returns"	Kelsey Grammer	Chris Marcil	November 4, 2003	1107	10.21
Frasier makes a return to practising private psychiatry. Niles receives an unexpected phone call from a hysterical Maris, whose new boyfriend, an Argentinian polo player, has a violent temper. Niles advises Maris to leave him, and is worried how Daphne will react to hearing about the meeting. Both Frasier and Martin advise him to keep it to himself, so when Daphne starts asking questions about lunch, Niles pretends to be organizing a surprise baby shower for her. However, the deception becomes progressively more difficult to sustain. The polo player comes to the apartment, mistakes Frasier for Niles, and punches him in the face. Daphne learns that Niles met with Maris and is furious that he lied. Later, Niles apologizes to Daphne and she accepts his apology. As they leave, the radio changes to a news broadcast which reveals that Maris killed her boyfriend.
248	8	"Murder Most Maris"	Scott Ellis	Sam Johnson	November 11, 2003	1108	11.86
Maris has been arrested for the murder of her Argentinian boyfriend, and the police have called in Niles for questioning. The murder weapon was an antique crossbow belonging to Niles, which he had lent to Maris for an artistic reenactment. Frasier makes a television statement on Niles's behalf, but makes a horrendous malapropism, saying his brother should be "executed" instead of "exonerated". Niles has been extremely calm in spite of the situation, but then suffers a nervous breakdown in Café Nervosa. He undresses and ends up sitting at a table, naked, reading a newspaper. After things have calmed down and Niles' breakdown ended, Maris calls once more. He says he will help her, but his and Daphne's life is first and foremost.
249	9	"Guns N' Neuroses"	Scott Ellis	Jon Sherman	November 18, 2003	1109	11.60
Lilith (Bebe Neuwirth) is in town for a psychiatric conference, and Frasier reluctantly meets with her. Before he does so, a colleague of Lilith's sets him up on a blind date with her, not knowing who he really is. Meanwhile, Martin's pistol accidentally discharges inside the apartment, creating a trail of destruction that he, Daphne and Niles attempt to hide from Frasier.
250	10	"SeaBee Jeebies"	Kelsey Grammer	Patricia Breen	December 2, 2003	1110	10.68
Since Maris' murder case appeared in the news, Niles has acquired a certain celebrity status in Seattle, socializing with figures like Bill Gates. Frasier cannot help being annoyed by this, and he finds Roz in a similar position; she is receiving a visit from her "perfect" married sister, Denise (Suzanne Cryer). Frasier hopes to regain some notoriety when he is nominated twice for the Seattle broadcasting awards (the "SeaBees"), and Kenny arranges for a news reporter to shadow him on the day of the ceremony. Unusually, it takes place in the morning due to an error from Kenny, and in the absence of a date, Frasier asks Denise to take the part just for presentation.
251	11	"High Holidays"	Sheldon Epps	Christopher Lloyd	December 9, 2003	1111	11.71
It is Christmas. Frasier has been asked to act in a commercial for the Seattle Tourist Board, and is attracted to Natalie (Musetta Vander) who is arranging it. He meets her in Café Nervosa, but she also meets Martin and Eddie, and decides that he should be in the video as well. Meanwhile, Frederick (Trevor Einhorn) visits, but is now a goth, and wants to spend all his time with his girlfriend Andi. Niles, seeking a belated teenage rebellion, buys a pot brownie from Roz, but Martin unwittingly eats it and replaces it with a normal brownie. Later, Niles arrives at Frasier's apartment believing himself to be "high" on his pot brownie. Martin arrives soon after, and the brownie switch is revealed. Meanwhile, Frasier is a bit depressed as his date, Natalie, left him midway through the date to meet another man. Freddie also experiences the same thing and the similarity in incidents help father and son to bond again.
252	12	"Frasier-Lite"	Sheldon Epps	Sam Johnson & Chris Marcil & Jeffrey Richman and Jon Sherman & Bob Daily & Patricia Breen	January 6, 2004	1112	10.92
The KACL team has a weight loss competition with competing radio station, KPXY. At the initial weigh-in, Frasier recognizes one of his "mortal enemies" from his high school days participating on the opposing team. The two make a bet on the outcome of the winner, with Frasier’s dignity pitted up against a new chess set. At the final weigh-in, the KACL team loses by a mere 2 ounces. Roz then cuts off her hair and KACL wins the competition. Guest Callers: Stanley Tucci as Morrie; Penny Marshall as Celeste; Estelle Parsons as Celeste's Mother; Hilary Duff as Britney
253	13	"The Ann Who Came to Dinner"	Scott Ellis	Sam Johnson & Chris Marcil	January 13, 2004	1114	10.78
Martin discovers an envelope in the pocket of one of his jackets, which contains a check for Frasier’s home insurance renewal and should have been posted months previously. Realising this, Frasier makes a hasty call to the company, and is horrified at the amount he would have to pay now to renew. Roz advises him to consult Ann Hodges (Julia Sweeney), whom Frasier previously dated. He reluctantly agrees, and invites her round to survey his home, where she slips on a mayonnaise spillage in the kitchen and breaks her leg. Anxious to avoid a lawsuit when he has no insurance, Frasier decides to invite Ann to stay at his place for a few days while she recovers. Meanwhile, Maris is on house arrest and begins selling her possessions due to the imminent murder trial and Niles buys back an embarrassing painting of himself. However, Maris secretly plants her ankle tracking device on the painting to distract the police into chasing Niles while she escapes to a private island owned by her family, never to return to the United States.
254	14	"Freudian Sleep"	Cynthia J. Popp	Lori Kirkland Baker	February 3, 2004	1117	12.20
Frasier’s radio show is receiving very few calls, and Niles has been losing patients and arguing with Daphne. Martin, on the other hand, is offered the chance to spend the weekend at a house in the mountains with Ronee, courtesy of her boss. They inadvertently end up inviting Frasier, Niles and Daphne to join them, and seeing the state those three are in, Martin and Ronee feel compelled not to let them down. They all go to the house determined to have a relaxing time, but once there Frasier has a nightmare in which he has murdered Niles and is married to Daphne. Soon afterwards, Niles has a nightmare about the stresses of being a father, and then Daphne also has one in which she puts on copious weight after childbirth and Niles sleeps with other women. The three of them all end up in the kitchen in the middle of the night arguing.
255	15	"Caught in the Act"	Kelsey Grammer	Joe Keenan	February 24, 2004	1116	10.11
Roz is disappointed when she is unable to get Alice tickets to a concert by children's performer Nanette Guzman (Nanny G) (played by Laurie Metcalf). After his family reveals that he used to be married to her, Frasier agrees to help Roz secure tickets. Nanette and Frasier remain attracted to each other, and plan a rendezvous at his apartment. However, she shows up with her producer, Donald (Don McManus), who is also her husband. She claims that the marriage is only a business arrangement, and laments how frustrated she is with her life. She makes several passes at Frasier, and asks him to meet up with her after her concert the next day. He decides not to, and stops by before the show to share his decision. Nanny G asks him to go down to the prop room to talk. She seduces Frasier, and he takes off his clothes and jumps into the prop bed with her, only to have it rise to the stage as the show begins.
256	16	"Boo!"	Katy Garretson	Jeffrey Richman	March 2, 2004	1115	10.42
Frasier is becoming fed up with his father playing tricks on him, and mocking the effeminate scream that his pranks provoke. It happens that Frasier is treating a patient who has the rare condition of coulrophobia – fear of clowns. Part of the treatment he has planned is to dress up as a clown, so he has a very comprehensive costume. In a bid for vengeance on his father, Frasier disguises himself as a clown, which Martin hates. After Frasier jumps out at him wearing the outfit, Martin has a heart attack and is hospitalized. This spurs Martin to propose to Ronee (Wendie Malick) while recovering.
257	17	"Coots and Ladders"	Kelsey Grammer	Heide Perlman	March 16, 2004	1118	8.25
Frasier had been having a bad day. During his radio show, he came down with a coughing fit and Roz had to advise his kleptomaniac caller, Babette, after which she claimed he had been dispensing the same advice for ten years. He was later turned down by an attractive woman who had parked her car in his space, and cornered at his front door by an elderly neighbor (Estelle Parsons) who said she could set her watch by his routine. Calling round to change a light bulb for his neighbor, he learned that even she is still dating at the age of 83. He surreptitiously steals an item from one of her shelves, just for the thrill. However, he is plagued by guilt, and wants Niles' help in returning the item. Guest Caller: Helen Mirren as Babette
258	18	"Match Game"	Katy Garretson	Bob Daily	March 30, 2004	1113	11.23
Frasier stumbles upon a matchmaking service on the way to his office. The agent, Charlotte (Laura Linney), persuades him to sign up for $10,000, after which he is sent on a series of disastrous dates, and eventually loses patience and demands his money back. He discovers that the dating agency has almost no clients.
259	19	"Miss Right Now"	Scott Ellis	Ken Levine & David Isaacs	April 6, 2004	1119	10.36
Martin is soon to meet Ronee's mother again, and given that she is opposed to pre-marital sex, they have to pretend that they are not practicing it. Frasier is distracted constantly by thoughts of Charlotte, the matchmaking agent with whom he had dinner the other night, but who is already in a relationship. Niles agrees with him that his feelings could be transference, but after seeing Frasier when he talks to Charlotte, Roz dismisses that theory instantly. She decides to help Frasier out by taking him to a bar, where he meets a flirtatious woman called Kim (Jennifer Tilly). They both go back to his place, but receive several interruptions, the last of which is by Charlotte, who has just had an argument with her boyfriend and wished to be consoled by Frasier. Meanwhile, Niles has developed an uncharacteristic taste for fast food, and it is driving Daphne to distraction.
260	20	"And Frasier Makes Three"	Scott Ellis	Sam Johnson	April 20, 2004	1120	10.77
Frasier wishes to tempt Charlotte away from Frank (Aaron Eckhart), so he invites her for what she assumes to be a working dinner at a high-quality restaurant. However, Frank also turns up. Frank suspects nothing and thinks of Frasier as a real friend. There is, however, tension between him and Charlotte, and matters come to a head one evening when Frasier has cooked dinner for Charlotte and Frank turns up unannounced. The couple have an argument and Frank walks out, leaving Frasier with just the opportunity he was hoping for. Martin plans to give Ronee her engagement ring, but when Daphne and Roz discover that it is the same ring he planned to give to Sherry, they insist that he sell it and buy one especially for Ronee.
261	21	"Detour"	Kelsey Grammer	Chris Marcil	April 27, 2004	1121	12.44
Having spent the night with Charlotte, Frasier is very pleased with himself. However, his good mood disappears when, while driving her to the station to catch a train to Portland, she tells him that in three weeks she will be moving back home to Chicago. Neither wants a long-distance relationship, so they are compelled to consider breaking up before things get more serious. In the midst of this conversation, they miss the train, so Frasier drives to the next station. Owing to his over-careful driving, they miss it again, and then the car breaks down on the way to the next station, leaving them stranded in the middle of nowhere. Fortunately, they find the house of an experienced car mechanic and his family, but they turn out to be rather eccentric. Meanwhile, in Frasier's absence, Niles is left to organize the entertainment for Martin’s bachelor party, and Roz has found him a stripper. For Niles that she is coming round to be interviewed on the same day as Daphne's new nanny, while the stripper is mistaken for Martin's new physiotherapist.
262	22	"Crock Tales"	Sheldon Epps	Jon Sherman & Bob Daily	May 4, 2004	1122	14.33
Frasier chips an old earthenware crock pot while preparing dinner, and is about to throw it away, when he pauses, and remembers the dinners associated with the item, going back in time until finally remembering the first dinner he had made for his father, Niles, Daphne and Roz. The show invented new scenes from previous seasons, with the cast wearing the hairstyles, clothes, and vocal and semiotic mannerisms from those previous seasons, in some cases wearing wigs.: 2003: Niles and Daphne are still newlyweds, just back from their honeymoon in Tahiti. Roz tries to set up Frasier with her friend Lizbeth.; 2002: It is Roz's birthday, and Cinco de Mayo celebrations are being held in Seattle. Niles and Daphne are enjoying their active sex life.; 1999: The Crane family are celebrating Independence Day.; 1998: The Crane family are celebrating Thanksgiving Day. Frasier is still unemployed after KACL had changed formats, but Daphne is concerned that Frasier might fire her due to a lack of funds. Niles is separated from Maris, and unhappy with his new residence at the Shangri-La. He is pining for Daphne. Following the changed KACL format, Roz has a temp job.; 1996: Niles is still married to Maris. Frasier is having his disastrous dating woes. Roz is enjoying the single life.; 1993: Frasier's hair is longer and Daphne’s hair is a bouffant. Frasier and Martin are still sniping at each other, Niles is married to Maris but bringing Daphne gifts, Frasier and Niles begin their love of sherry, Kenny Daly appears as a pizza delivery boy hoping to break into Seattle radio.; After the flashbacks, Frasier repairs the crock pot, warmly places flowers in it, and gives it an honored place on the dinner table, as everyone arrives. When he fills it with water, the pot immediately begins to leak from all the cracks.
263	23	"Goodnight, Seattle"	David Lee	Christopher Lloyd & Joe Keenan	May 13, 2004	1123	25.25
264	24	"Goodnight, Seattle"	David Lee	Christopher Lloyd & Joe Keenan	May 13, 2004	1124	25.25
While on a plane, Frasier meets a woman named Anne. They engage in conversation and in flashback, Frasier recalls the events preceding his plane ride: Frasier and Niles volunteer to put together a quick wedding for Martin and Ronee when the venue is only available for one day. Meanwhile, Frasier says farewell to Charlotte as she departs for Chicago. The wedding ceremony gets off to a rocky start when the guests are stranded outside in the heat and things get worse when Eddie swallows one of the rings. Daphne and Niles rush him to a nearby veterinarian and while there, Daphne goes into labor and gives birth to her and Niles' son. Ronee and Martin get married at the vet clinic. Frasier's agent Bebe Glazer gets him an offer to do a television show in San Francisco, which Frasier initially declines but after realizing that he wants to start a new chapter in his life, he accepts. A case of communication breakdowns lead Martin, Ronee, Roz, Daphne and Niles to believe that Frasier is dying, an error given more substantial backing when he begins giving them each some of his most prized possessions, and when a doctor phones and leaves a message saying that Frasier's 'results weren't good.' The misunderstanding is soon cleared up and the family celebrates Frasier's new opportunity in San Francisco. Before he leaves, Frasier and his family share a tearful farewell and Frasier explains to them that with Martin and Ronee newly-weds and Daphne and Niles' newborn, David, and Roz getting the job of station manager at KACL they each have begun a new chapter in their lives and that he wants that for himself now. He then goes on to recite Tennyson's "Ulysses" which flows into him saying it in his last show. Frasier records his last show, with the people who work at KACL and his family watching him, his final words on his talk show are "For eleven years, you have heard me say 'I'm listening'; well you were listening too, and for that I'm eternally grateful...Goodnight Seattle", and hangs up his headphones before the episode flashes back to the plane, where Frasier has just finished relaying his story to Anne. In a final twist, the plane touches down not in San Francisco, but in Chicago. Frasier turns to Anne and says "Wish me luck..." Niles and Daphne’s baby is named David, in memory of show creator David Angell, who died on September 11, 2001.

== Reception ==
The season ranked 35th in the seasonal ratings and had an average viewership of 10.920 million viewers.
