= Brookstone School Secondary =

Coordinates: 4°47′18.0″N 7°00′18.6″E

- Port-Harcourt; Nigeria

Information
- Established: 2006
- Colour: navy / sky blue
- Website: www.brookstoneng.org

Brookstone School Secondary is a school located in Port-Harcourt, Nigeria, in a remote area called Igwuruta. It has "secondary" in its name because it also has a primary school component in a different location. It was founded in 2006; prior to its existence, other educational institutes were available in that area.

== Uniform ==
The school colours are navy blue and sky blue. The students wear navy blue skirts and trousers and sky blue shirts. Variations in colour occur in the sports wear, which are blue, red, yellow and green. The sports colours represent precious stones: blue for sapphire, red for ruby, yellow for topaz and green for emerald.

== Curriculum ==
The school offers both British and Nigerian curricula. Students sit for international and local exams like Cambridge international Examinations (CIE), National Examinations Council (NECO), International General Certificate of Secondary Education (IGCSE), and the West African Senior School Certificate Examination (WASSCE), Test of English as a Foreign Language (TOEFL), Standard Assessment Task Examination (SAT). These exams are taken at various points throughout the six years spent at the school.

== Sports and activities ==
The school program allows a wide variety of sporting activities including basketball, soccer, athletics, table tennis and lawn tennis, making allowances for fatter students. The school's soccer team competes in various tournaments.

The school also has non-sport activities like Press Club, Drama Club, Art Club, Swimming Club and ICT club. Occasionally the school takes students on field trips to France.

== See also ==
- List of schools in Port Harcourt
