= Niger Delta Science School =

- 4°50′8″N 6°59′44″E / 4.83556°N 6.99556°E; Port Harcourt, Rivers State; Nigeria

Information
- Former name: Ompadec Science centre
- School type: Secondary School
- Category: Schools in Port Harcourt

Niger Delta Science School (NDSS), formerly known as Ompadec Science Centre, is a specialist science secondary school in Port Harcourt, Nigeria. It is located within the Rivers State College of Arts and Science main campus in Rumuola. It is an all senior secondary school, having only SS1 - SS3 classes. The approximate coordinates of the school are: 4°50′8″N 6°59′44″E (4.835739, 6.995757).

== See also ==
- List of schools in Port Harcourt
