= NDSL =

NDSL can refer to:

- Nintendo DS Lite, a 2006 handheld video game console
- Naked DSL, style of broadband connection
- National Defense Student Loan, a program established by the National Defense Education Act
