= List of radio stations in Port Harcourt =

The following is a list of radio stations in Port Harcourt, Nigeria.

Radio station	Frequency
Super FM	FM 93.3 (MHz)
The Beat FM	FM 99.9 (MHz)
Naija FM	FM 92.7 (MHz)
Mejority FM	FM 89.5 (MHz)
Family Love FM	FM 97.7 (MHz)
Nigeria Info	FM 92.3 (MHz)
Wave 91.7 FM	FM 91.7 (MHz)
Classic FM	FM 91.1 (MHz)
Cool FM	FM 95.9 (MHz)
Ray Power	FM 106.5 (MHz)
Rhythm FM	FM 93.7 (MHz)
Treasure	FM 98.5 (MHz)
Today FM	FM 95.1 (MHz)
Excel FM (Radio UST)	103.7 (MHz)
Wazobia	FM 94.1 (MHz)
Sound City fm	FM 96.5 (MHz)
Radio Uniport (88.5 Unique FM)	FM 88.5 (MHz)
Radio Biafra	FM 105.3 (MHz)
Radio Rivers	FM 99.1 (MHz)
Garden City	FM 89.9 (MHz)
Wish FM	FM 99.5 (MHz)
MAX FM	FM 102.3 (MHz)
Dream FM	FM 92.5 (MHz)
Oralvault Radio	Web Radio
Sunrise FM	FM 96.1 (MHz)
Brila FM	FM 101.1 (MHz)
Exceed FM	FM 93.5 (MHz)
Rapid FM	90.7 (MHz)

== See also ==
- Music of Port Harcourt
- Media of Nigeria
