= Rivers State Television =

RSTV
- Elelenwo, Port Harcourt; Nigeria
- City: Port Harcourt, Rivers State
- Channels: Digital: 22 (UHF)
- Branding: RSTV Channel 22

Ownership
- Owner: RSG

History
- Founded: 1985
- Former call signs: RSBC-TV
- Former channel number: 55 (1985-1991)

Technical information
- ERP: 30 kilowatts
- Transmitter coordinates: 4°49′46″N 7°4′31″E

Links
- Website: rstv-ng.com

Rivers State Television (abbreviated RSTV), UHF channel 22 is a state-owned television station in Port Harcourt city, Rivers State. It began its operation in 1985. Initially, the station's broadcasting power was 1 kW and signals were transmitted on UHF channel 55.

After an upgrade in 1991, RSTV moved to UHF Channel 22 and had its radiated power boosted to 30 kW.

== Signal transmission and reception ==
RSTV's signal is received in parts of nine states. Its studios and transmitter are co-located in the Elelenwo neighbourhood on the southwest side of Oyigbo.

== See also ==
- Radio Rivers 99.1
