= Marygold International School =

Location
- 58 Station Road; Elelenwo, Port Harcourt, Rivers State; Nigeria
- 4°50′30.08″N 7°4′51.44″E

Information
- School type: Private, Co-educational, Day and Boarding
- Motto: Solid Foundation
- Established: 2002
- Founders: Janeth Weli, Obinna Weli
- Website: www.marygoldschool.com

Marygold International School is a private, co-educational, boarding and day school founded by Mr. Obinna and Mrs. Janeth Weli in 2002. The school provides crèche, toddler, pre-nursery, nursery, primary and secondary school facilities. Its main building is located at 58 Station Road, Elelenwo, Port Harcourt, Rivers State, Nigeria.

== Departments ==
The school currently includes the following departments:

- Science department
- Music department
- ICT department
- Phonics department
- Vocational department
