= Jesuit Memorial College =

Jesuit Memorial College Port Harcourt

Location
- 60 Angels Memoria Road, Mbodo-Aluu; Port Harcourt, Rivers State; Nigeria; 4°55′37.9″N 6°58′0.76″E

Information
- Type: Private secondary school
- Motto: Hope Reborn
- Religious affiliation: Catholicism
- Denomination: Jesuit
- Established: 2013; 13 years ago
- Founder: Society of Jesus
- President: Fr. Maduabuchi Leo Muoneme, SJ
- Principal: Fr. Alexander Irechukwu, SJ
- Chaplain: Fr. Uchechukwu Daniel Oguike, SJ
- Staff: 143
- Faculty: 68
- Enrollment: 561
- Campus: 21 hectares (52 acres)
- Color: Green
- Mascot: Phoenix
- Website: www.jesuitmemorial.org

Jesuit Memorial College (abbreviated as JMC), is a private Catholic secondary school, located in Mbodo-Aluu, Port Harcourt, Rivers State, Nigeria. The co-educational school was founded in October 2013 by the North-West Africa Province of the Society of Jesus as a monument to the sixty students of Loyola Jesuit College (LJC) Abuja who died in the crash of Sosoliso Airlines Flight 1145 in 2005.

The current student population is around 600. The college has been a featured school for its efforts to respond to environmental issues.

== See also ==
- Catholic Church in Nigeria
- Education in Nigeria
- List of Jesuit schools
