= Charles Dale Memorial International School =

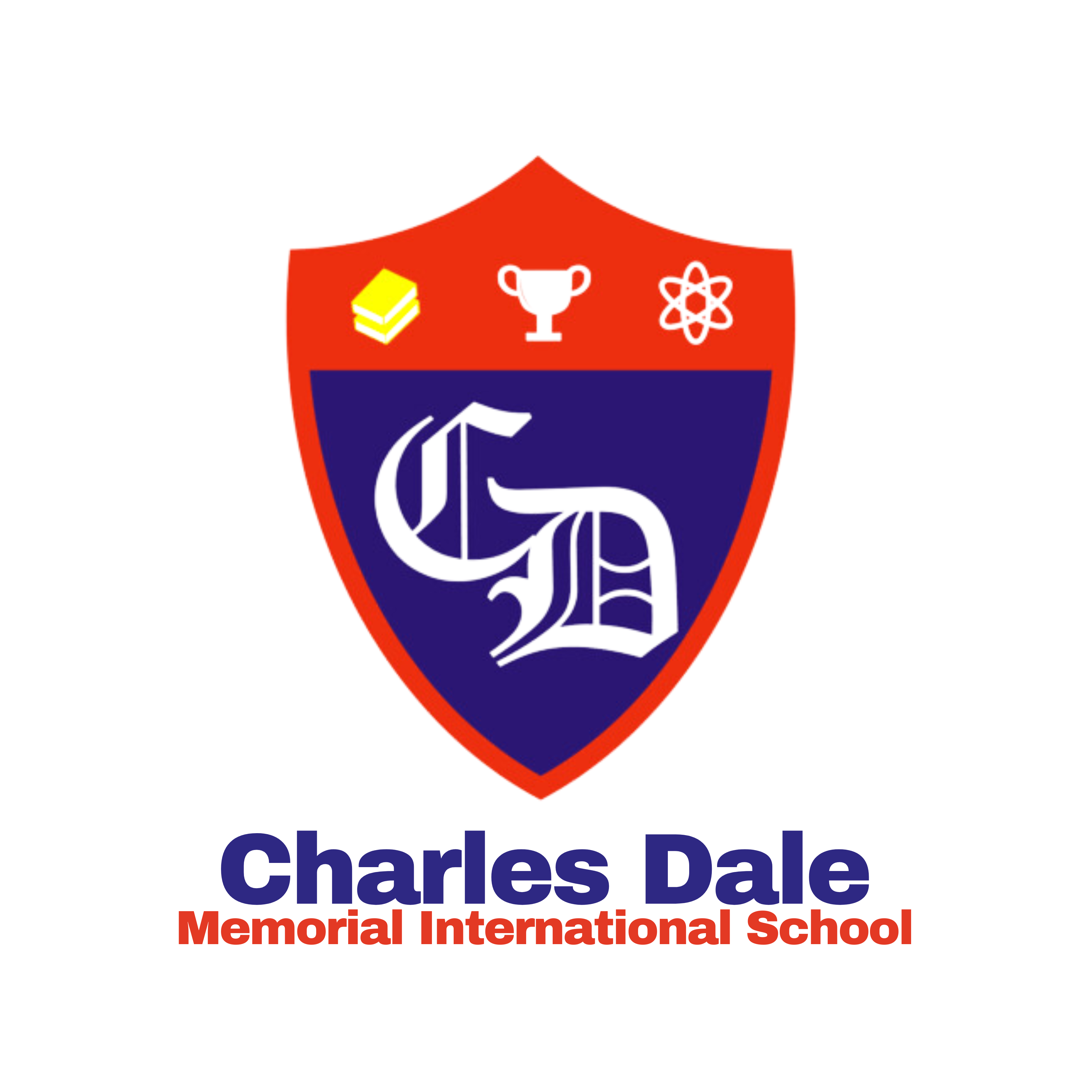

Location
- No. 12 Army Range Road, Igwuruta-Eneka; Port Harcourt, Rivers State; Nigeria

Information
- School type: Secondary School
- Motto: Diligence, Excellence and Integrity
- Established: 2006
- Founder: Chief Victoria O. R. Diete-Spiff
- Gender: Co-Educational
- Average class size: 25 (maximum)
- Campus type: Boarding House
- Colours: Light blue and grey
- Slogan: To educate young people to become model citizens of the world.
- Sports: Soccer, Tennis (planned), Basketball, Swimming (planned).
- Website: http://www.charlesdaleschool.com/

Charles Dale Memorial International School (CDMIS) is a secondary boarding school located in the city of Port Harcourt, Nigeria and affiliated with Bereton Montessori School. At present it holds 400 students and little over 45 teaching staff. It is located at no. 12 Army Range Road, Igwuruta-Eneka.

== History ==
The leadership of Bereton Montessori Nursery and Primary School, in conjunction with the school's 25th anniversary in 2003, elected to open a secondary school. This would allow students to continue their education at the secondary level. Groundbreaking of the school was held in 2004; construction included modern classrooms, science labs, computer labs with internet access, sport fields, a library, and student and staff housing. The school opened to students on 30 September 2006. The school is named in memory of Charles Dale for his contributions to education in Nigeria. The school's founder, Chief Victoria O. R. Diete-Spiff, is Dale's daughter.

The 2006–07 academic year began with 32 students and 14 faculty; enrollment increased to 38 students by April 2007. Enrollment jumped to 149 students in September 2007 and 237 as of January 2009.

== See also ==
- List of schools in Port Harcourt
