= CITA International School =

Private school in Rivers State, Nigeria

Location
- Port Harcourt Campus; Rumuogba; Port Harcourt, Rivers State, 500102; Nigeria; Etche Campus; Umuchoko, Chokota; Etche, Rivers State, 512101; Nigeria
- Coordinates: 4°50′22.65″N 7°2′10.68″E

Information
- Type: Private
- Motto: Building on a Sure Foundation
- Religious affiliation: Christian
- Established: Nur/Primary: 1981; Secondary: 2001
- Gender: Boys and girls
- Age: 6 months to 16
- Website: CITA International School

CITA International School, also known simply as CITA, is a private, Christian school in Rivers State, Nigeria. CITA offers nursery, primary and secondary school education to children ages 6 months through to 16 years. The school was founded on 15 May 1981. It initially functioned as a nursery and primary school until 2001, when the high school section was established.

Currently, the nursery and primary school is sited on a well planned government residential area of Rumuogba in Port Harcourt, while the secondary school is at Rumuochokota in Etche local government area.
