= Hot in Cleveland season 3 =

Hot in Cleveland
- Season 3
- No. of episodes: 24

Release
- Original network: TV Land
- Original release: November 30, 2011 – June 6, 2012

Season chronology
- ← Previous; Season 2 Next → Season 4

The third season of the TV Land original sitcom Hot in Cleveland premiered on November 30, 2011. TV Land originally ordered 22 episodes but later increased the order to 24. The series stars Valerie Bertinelli, Wendie Malick, Jane Leeves, and Betty White.

== Cast ==
=== Main ===
- Valerie Bertinelli as Melanie Moretti
- Jane Leeves as Rejoyla "Joy" Scroggs
- Wendie Malick as Victoria Chase
- Betty White as Elka Ostrovsky

=== Recurring ===
- John Mahoney as Roy
- Jon Lovitz as Artie, the Opera Guy

=== Special guest stars ===
- Don Rickles as Bobby
- Kathie Lee Gifford as Christal
- Laura San Giacomo as Caroline
- Sandra Bernhard as Nan
- Sean Hayes as Chad
- Jennifer Love Hewitt as Emmy Chase
- Joe Jonas as Will
- Susan Lucci as herself
- Baron Davis as himself
- Huey Lewis as Johnny Revere
- Carl Reiner as Max
- Steven Weber as K.C.
- Edward Asner as Jameson
- Alex Borstein as Preshi
- Rhea Perlman as Jacki
- Georgia Engel as Mamie Sue Johnson
- Rick Springfield as Tom
- Andy Richter as Father Brian
- Paul Dooley as Bearded Man
- Kevin Nealon as George
- Joan Rivers as Anka
- Kristin Chenoweth as Courtney
- Cybill Shepherd as Apryl Sinclaire
- Barry Bostwick as Hugh
- Regis Philbin as Pierre
- David Spade as Christopher

=== Guest stars ===
- Kym Whitley as Jada
- Valerie Azlynn as Libby
- Gilles Marini as Captain Lebeau
- Orson Bean as Dan
- Marissa Jaret Winokur as Kim
- Kelly Schumann as Sally
- Yolanda Snowball as Pam
- Phil Morris as Lou
- Sean O'Bryan as Andy
- Bette Rae as Roy's Mother
- Tim Bagley as Larry
- David DeLuise as Jack
- Tim DeKay as Buddy
- Doug Savant as Scott
- Dan Cortese as Jimmy Armstrong
- Wendi McLendon-Covey as Nurse Sandy
- Willie Garson as Dr. Brotz
- Randy Wayne as Mark
- Ryan McPartlin as David
- Steve Valentine as Drago
- Dave Allen as David Gates
- Danielle Bisutti as Verena
- Curtis Armstrong as Clark
- Dan Gauthier as Nick
- Christopher Gorham as Casey
- James Patrick Stuart as Colin
- Reid Scott as Sam
- Echo Kellum as Aaron
- Maree Cheatham as Mrs. Filsinger
- D.C. Douglas as Peter Filsinger
- Craig Bierko as Donald
- Roger Bart as Jimmy
- Jonathan Silverman as Dr. Minton
- Rosa Blasi as Jessica
- Mel Rodriguez as Hector
- Francine York as Lady Natalie

== Production ==
On February 28, 2011, TV Land renewed the show for a third season to consist of 22 episodes. However, on March 21, 2011, the episode order for season three was increased from 22 to 24 episodes. This season premiered on November 30, 2011, and ran straight through until June 6, 2012.

Guest stars in season three include Kathie Lee Gifford, Sandra Bernhard, Laura San Giacomo, Gilles Marini, Don Rickles, Jennifer Love Hewitt, Joe Jonas, Huey Lewis, John Mahoney, Susan Lucci, Regis Philbin, Joan Rivers, Georgia Engel, Rhea Perlman, Roger Bart, Kevin Nealon, Craig Bierko, Josh Cribbs, Steven Weber, Ryan McPartlin, James Denton, Kristin Chenoweth, Rick Springfield, and Doug Savant.

== Release ==
Season three was released in Region 1 on November 27, 2012. The DVD includes all 24 episodes on 3 discs, and also features a "Some Like it Hot behind-the-scenes special".

== Episodes ==
No. overall	No. in season	Title	Directed by	Written by	Original release date	Prod. code	U.S. viewers (millions)
33	1	"Elka's Choice"	David Trainer	Anne Flett-Giordano & Chuck Ranberg	November 30, 2011	301	1.94
Elka is forced to choose between her thought-to-be-dead husband Bobby (Don Rickles), her old boyfriend, Max and her new boyfriend/fiancee, Fred. Elsewhere, Victoria takes advantage of her marriage to Joy and appears on a View rip-off talk show called "The Chatter", hosted by female celebrities Christal (Kathie Lee Gifford), Jada (Kym Whitley) and Libby (Valerie Azlynn).
34	2	"Beards"	David Trainer	Sam Johnson & Chris Marcil	December 7, 2011	303	1.42
The girls go on a gay cruise, where Victoria plans to speak about her "relationship" with Joy, until they both fall for the captain, Captain Lebeau (Gilles Marini). Melanie runs into her sister, Caroline (Laura San Giacomo), and discovers she is a lesbian. Caroline's lover (Sandra Bernhard) makes a pass at Melanie, after Melanie pretends to be a lesbian to stay on the cruise.
35	3	"Funeral Crashers"	David Trainer	Steve Joe	December 14, 2011	304	1.71
Elka teaches Melanie and the girls how to crash a funeral, to help Melanie find a missing dress. Joy and Victoria must face things from their pasts, while Elka reunites with Roy (John Mahoney) a former acquaintance.
36	4	"Happy Fat"	David Trainer	Eric Zicklin	December 21, 2011	305	1.80
Melanie, Joy and Victoria give their neighbors makeovers. Meanwhile, Elka and Roy go skydiving.
37	5	"One Thing or a Mother"	Joe Regalbuto	Sebastian Jones	December 28, 2011	306	1.87
Victoria dates a self-obsessed hand model (Sean Hayes). Joy cannot determine the age of her date (Phil Morris). Melanie dates a guy (Sean O'Bryan) who prefers being naked from the waist down. Roy's mother (surprisingly still alive) disapproves of his relationship with Elka. The girls invite their dates to a dinner party, with predictably disastrous results.
38	6	"How Did You Guys Meet, Anyway?"	David Trainer	Suzanne Martin	January 4, 2012	302	1.82
While waiting in a long bathroom line at the Cleveland Browns football game, the girls tell Elka the story of how they met in Los Angeles in the 1980s. (This episode features 2 clips of the game show Body Language featuring Betty White as a celebrity partner, digitally altered to include an "Elka" nametag.)
39	7	"Two Girls and a Rhino"	David Trainer	Rachel Sweet	January 11, 2012	307	1.70
Joy and Elka are forced to look after a rhinoceros at the Cleveland Zoo. Elsewhere, Victoria dates a janitor (Tim DeKay), while Melanie dates a state senator (Doug Savant).
40	8	"God and Football"	Andy Cadiff	Alex Herschlag	January 18, 2012	308	1.42
Melanie takes Elka to a football game, as a present for her 90th birthday, and finds romance with a kicker (Dan Cortese). Meanwhile, Victoria believes that Elka is God.
41	9	"Love is Blind"	David Trainer	Sam Johnson & Chris Marcil	January 25, 2012	309	1.43
Joy dates a 22-year-old blind man (Randy Wayne), who believes that she is 26 years old. Meanwhile, Victoria receives a surprise visit from her daughter, Emmy (Jennifer Love Hewitt), and Melanie from her son Will (Joe Jonas), who reveal their plan to wed each other. Elsewhere, Elka prank calls A-Rod.
42	10	"Life with Lucci"	Andy Cadiff	Chuck Ranberg & Anne Flett-Giordano	February 1, 2012	310	1.64
After All My Children is canceled, Susan Lucci seeks Victoria's comfort. When she interferes in the ladies' lives, it becomes clear that you can take the actress off of the soap opera, but you can't take the soap opera out of the actress.
43	11	"I'm with the Band"	Andy Cadiff	Steve Joe	February 8, 2012	311	1.35
Johnny Revere (Huey Lewis) returns to town to record a charity single with an unruly former bandmate, Drago (Steve Valentine). Johnny also tells Victoria that he is getting engaged to a younger woman, and is ending their sexual fling. To get back at Johnny, Victoria begins a relationship with Drago. Melanie is anxious to meet David Gates from the band Bread, but misidentifies a different David Gates (Dave "Gruber" Allen), the CEO of a minivan company. Wanting to be discovered as a singer, Joy damages the voice of singer Verena (Danielle Bisutti), in a singing challenge and pretends to be her to record the charity single. Elka schemes to cut the hair of a famous singer to auction online for charity.
44	12	"Lost Loves"	Andy Cadiff	Eric Zicklin	February 15, 2012	312	1.41
The girls go searching for their lost loves, including the man who stood Joy up at her wedding. Elka "accidentally" runs into Max (Carl Reiner). Victoria reconnects with her first husband Clark (Curtis Armstrong), only to find he has changed dramatically. Melanie misinterprets a Facebook comment by her former high school crush (Dan Gauthier), but ends up connecting with KC (Steven Weber), who is also Joy's ex-fiancé.
45	13	"Tangled Web"	Andy Cadiff	Sam Johnson & Chris Marcil	March 7, 2012	313	1.82
The ladies escape to a lake house after Victoria sets loose a poisonous spider; Melanie finds out her new love interest is actually Joy's former fiancé. So Melanie has a handsome Mormon (Christopher Gorham), pretend to be her new boyfriend.
46	14	"Hot & Heavy"	Andy Cadiff	Rachel Sweet	March 14, 2012	315	1.31
Victoria wears a fat suit to win a major news award. Colin (James Patrick Stuart), Victoria's co-anchor and rival gets the same idea and unintentionally uses it to have Joy fall in love with him. Melanie meets Sam (Reid Scott), a handsome man at a Sexaholics Anonymous meeting.
47	15	"Rubber Ball"	Andy Cadiff	Sebastian Jones	March 21, 2012	314	1.45
Melanie, Victoria and Joy set out to get into a country club, and meet with rubber magnate Jameson (Ed Asner), who has a connection to Elka. The girls then attend the club’s “Rubber Ball,” attempting to woo membership sponsors, where they find Artie (Jon Lovitz), the homeless man who almost became Joy's green-card spouse, is actually from a wealthy family. The girls also help Artie impress Preshi (Alex Borstein), a fellow country club member.
48	16	"Everything Goes Better with Vampires"	Andy Cadiff	Chuck Ranberg & Anne Flett-Giordano	March 28, 2012	316	1.92
Victoria is annoyed by the new lazy housekeeper (Rhea Perlman), who cannot understand Joy due to her accent. Joy falls for a man who claims to be Rick Springfield. Melanie is annoyed by her new professor boyfriend, Donald (Craig Bierko). Elka and old friend, Marnie (Georgia Engel) write a radio play together, but the two disagree on ideas. Things come to a head when everyone is forced to stay inside due to a manhunt for an escaped convict.
49	17	"Claus, Tails & High Pitched Males: Birthdates 3"	Andy Cadiff	Vanessa McCarthy	April 11, 2012	317	1.46
The ladies set each other up on dates for their annual birthdate celebration. Victoria is set up with previous cruise ship fling, Captain Lebeau; Melanie is set up with a Jersey Boys cast member (Roger Bart) who has an unfortunate trait; Joy dates Melanie's former priest (Andy Richter), and Elka dates someone who might be magical (Paul Dooley).
50	18	"Cruel Shoes"	Andy Cadiff	Sebastian Jones	April 18, 2012	318	1.09
A line of shoes Victoria designed is going public at a fashion show. Joy, Melanie and Elka agree to model Victoria's shoes, and discover an unfortunate problem. Melanie gets a beauty mark for the modeling gig, but it doesn't stay in place. Joy begins a whirlwind romance with a terminally ill man named George (Kevin Nealon), who is crossing things off his bucket list.
51	19	"Bye George, I Think He's Got It!"	David Trainer	Rachel Sweet	April 25, 2012	319	1.38
Joy's romance with George continues. Elka gets a visit from her twin sister (Joan Rivers), while Victoria and Melanie try to help Artie pick up women.
52	20	"The Gateway Friend"	Andy Cadiff; Dennis Capps	Steve Joe	May 2, 2012	320	1.12
The girls have to get their L.A. friend, Courtney (Kristin Chenoweth) back together with her Beverly Hills dermatologist boyfriend, Dr. Minton (Jonathan Silverman) or face the prospect of never getting an appointment with him again.
53	21	"Some Like It Hot"	N/A	N/A	May 9, 2012	322	1.21
A look behind the scenes of Hot in Cleveland, with never-before-seen footage of the cast and crew, in-depth interviews as well as favorite show moments and bloopers all from the third season.
54	22	"Storage Wars"	Andy Cadiff	Sam Johnson & Chris Marcil	May 16, 2012	321	1.17
The ladies bid on an abandoned storage unit and find an unsent letter from Abraham Lincoln hidden in a painting. Joy chats with a trucker (James Denton) through a CB radio and tells him she is very buxom, unaware that they will eventually meet. Storage Wars auctioneers Laura and Dan Dotson make a cameo appearance.
55	23	"What's Behind the Door"	Andy Cadiff	Alex Herschlag	May 30, 2012	324	1.19
Victoria comes up with the idea of reviving her old soap opera Edge of Tomorrow as a webisode series. But she ends up clashing with the creator (Cybill Shepherd) and working with incompetent actors (Barry Bostwick, Rosa Blasi and Mel Rodriguez).
56	24	"Blow Outs"	Andy Cadiff	Sebastian Jones	June 6, 2012	323	1.95
When Joy and Victoria follow Melanie to her new secret hair salon, true to Melanie's predictions, they manage cause a rift between the two hairdressers (Regis Philbin and David Spade). As Melanie's hair suffers in the fallout, tensions between the ladies escalate. The season ends on a cliffhanger, when the ladies find a baby on their doorstep.
