= List of Hot in Cleveland episodes =

Hot in Cleveland is an American television sitcom created by Suzanne Martin that premiered on June 16, 2010, on TV Land. The first TV Land’s venture into sitcoms, the premiere episode was the most-watched telecast in the network’s history. Hot in Cleveland is produced by Sean Hayes' Hazy Mills Productions and shot with a multicamera setup in front of a live studio audience at CBS Studio Center.

On May 1, 2014, TV Land renewed Hot in Cleveland for a sixth season and confirmed the following November that it would be the show's last. During the course of the series, 128 episodes of Hot in Cleveland aired over six seasons, between June 16, 2010, and June 3, 2015.

== Series overview ==
Season	Episodes	Originally released		Viewers (in millions)
Season	Episodes	First released	Last released	Viewers (in millions)
1	10	June 16, 2010	August 18, 2010	3.12
2	22	January 19, 2011	August 31, 2011	2.09
3	24	November 30, 2011	June 6, 2012	1.52
4	24	November 28, 2012	September 4, 2013	1.34
5	24	March 26, 2014	September 10, 2014	—N/a
6	24	November 5, 2014	June 3, 2015	0.79

== Episodes ==
=== Season 1 (2010) ===
No. overall	No. in season	Title	Directed by	Written by	Original release date	Prod. code	U.S. viewers (millions)
1	1	"Pilot"	Michael Lembeck	Suzanne Martin	June 16, 2010	101	4.75
2	2	"Who's Your Mama?"	Andy Cadiff	Suzanne Martin	June 23, 2010	102	3.37
3	3	"Birthdates"	Andy Cadiff	Vanessa McCarthy	June 30, 2010	103	3.07
4	4	"The Sex That Got Away"	David Trainer	Anne Flett-Giordano & Chuck Ranberg	July 7, 2010	105	2.93
5	5	"Good Neighbors"	David Trainer	Sam Johnson & Chris Marcil	July 14, 2010	106	2.99
6	6	"Meet the Parents"	Andy Cadiff	Liz Feldman	July 21, 2010	104	2.44
7	7	"It's Not That Complicated"	David Trainer	Anne Flett-Giordano & Chuck Ranberg	July 28, 2010	107	2.97
8	8	"The Play's the Thing"	Gil Junger	Sam Johnson & Chris Marcil	August 4, 2010	108	2.57
9	9	"Good Luck Faking the Goiter"	Gil Junger	Suzanne Martin	August 11, 2010	109	2.72
10	10	"Tornado"	Gil Junger	Vanessa McCarthy	August 18, 2010	110	3.40

=== Season 2 (2011) ===
No. overall	No. in season	Title	Directed by	Written by	Original release date	Prod. code	U.S. viewers (millions)
11	1	"Free Elka"	David Trainer	Suzanne Martin	January 19, 2011	201	2.95
12	2	"Bad Bromance"	David Trainer	Sam Johnson & Chris Marcil	January 26, 2011	202	2.30
13	3	"Hot for the Lawyer"	David Trainer	Steve Joe	February 2, 2011	204	2.36
14	4	"Sisterhood of the Traveling SPANX"	David Trainer	Rachel Sweet	February 9, 2011	203	2.11
15	5	"I Love Lucci, Part 1"	Andy Cadiff	Chuck Ranberg & Anne Flett-Giordano	February 16, 2011	205	1.92
16	6	"I Love Lucci, Part 2"	Andy Cadiff	Chuck Ranberg & Anne Flett-Giordano	February 23, 2011	206	1.71
17	7	"Dog Tricks, Sex Flicks & Joy's Fix"	Andy Cadiff	Eric Zicklin	March 2, 2011	207	1.96
18	8	"LeBron is Le Gone"	Andy Cadiff	Steve Joe	March 9, 2011	208	1.93
19	9	"Elka's Snowbird"	David Trainer	Steve Skrovan	March 16, 2011	209	1.56
20	10	"Law & Elka"	David Trainer	Sam Johnson & Chris Marcil	March 23, 2011	210	1.80
21	11	"Where's Elka?"	Andy Cadiff	Suzanne Martin	June 15, 2011	211	2.39
22	12	"How I Met My Mother"	Andy Cadiff	Steve Joe	June 22, 2011	212	1.97
23	13	"Unseparated at Birthdates"	Andy Cadiff	Rachel Sweet	June 29, 2011	215	2.29
24	14	"Battle of the Bands"	Andy Cadiff	Steve Skrovan	July 6, 2011	214	2.25
25	15	"Love Thy Neighbor"	Andy Cadiff	Sam Johnson & Chris Marcil	July 13, 2011	216	2.00
26	16	"Dancing Queens"	Andy Cadiff	Eric Zicklin	July 20, 2011	213	2.44
27	17	"The Emmy Show"	David Trainer	Steve Joe	July 27, 2011	221	1.84
28	18	"Arch Enemies"	David Trainer	Rachel Sweet	August 3, 2011	222	1.88
29	19	"Too Hot for TV"	N/A	N/A	August 10, 2011	218	2.03
30	20	"Indecent Proposals"	Andy Cadiff	Chuck Ranberg & Anne Flett-Giordano	August 17, 2011	217	1.77
31	21	"Bridezelka"	Andy Cadiff	Suzanne Martin	August 24, 2011	219	1.98
32	22	"Elka's Wedding"	David Trainer	Eric Zicklin	August 31, 2011	220	2.44

=== Season 3 (2011–12) ===
No. overall	No. in season	Title	Directed by	Written by	Original release date	Prod. code	U.S. viewers (millions)
33	1	"Elka's Choice"	David Trainer	Anne Flett-Giordano & Chuck Ranberg	November 30, 2011	301	1.94
34	2	"Beards"	David Trainer	Sam Johnson & Chris Marcil	December 7, 2011	303	1.42
35	3	"Funeral Crashers"	David Trainer	Steve Joe	December 14, 2011	304	1.71
36	4	"Happy Fat"	David Trainer	Eric Zicklin	December 21, 2011	305	1.80
37	5	"One Thing or a Mother"	Joe Regalbuto	Sebastian Jones	December 28, 2011	306	1.87
38	6	"How Did You Guys Meet, Anyway?"	David Trainer	Suzanne Martin	January 4, 2012	302	1.82
39	7	"Two Girls and a Rhino"	David Trainer	Rachel Sweet	January 11, 2012	307	1.70
40	8	"God and Football"	Andy Cadiff	Alex Herschlag	January 18, 2012	308	1.42
41	9	"Love is Blind"	David Trainer	Sam Johnson & Chris Marcil	January 25, 2012	309	1.43
42	10	"Life with Lucci"	Andy Cadiff	Chuck Ranberg & Anne Flett-Giordano	February 1, 2012	310	1.64
43	11	"I'm with the Band"	Andy Cadiff	Steve Joe	February 8, 2012	311	1.35
44	12	"Lost Loves"	Andy Cadiff	Eric Zicklin	February 15, 2012	312	1.41
45	13	"Tangled Web"	Andy Cadiff	Sam Johnson & Chris Marcil	March 7, 2012	313	1.82
46	14	"Hot & Heavy"	Andy Cadiff	Rachel Sweet	March 14, 2012	315	1.31
47	15	"Rubber Ball"	Andy Cadiff	Sebastian Jones	March 21, 2012	314	1.45
48	16	"Everything Goes Better with Vampires"	Andy Cadiff	Chuck Ranberg & Anne Flett-Giordano	March 28, 2012	316	1.92
49	17	"Claus, Tails & High Pitched Males: Birthdates 3"	Andy Cadiff	Vanessa McCarthy	April 11, 2012	317	1.46
50	18	"Cruel Shoes"	Andy Cadiff	Sebastian Jones	April 18, 2012	318	1.09
51	19	"Bye George, I Think He's Got It!"	David Trainer	Rachel Sweet	April 25, 2012	319	1.38
52	20	"The Gateway Friend"	Andy Cadiff; Dennis Capps	Steve Joe	May 2, 2012	320	1.12
53	21	"Some Like It Hot"	N/A	N/A	May 9, 2012	322	1.21
54	22	"Storage Wars"	Andy Cadiff	Sam Johnson & Chris Marcil	May 16, 2012	321	1.17
55	23	"What's Behind the Door"	Andy Cadiff	Alex Herschlag	May 30, 2012	324	1.19
56	24	"Blow Outs"	Andy Cadiff	Sebastian Jones	June 6, 2012	323	1.95

=== Season 4 (2012–13) ===
No. overall	No. in season	Title	Directed by	Written by	Original release date	Prod. code	U.S. viewers (millions)
57	1	"That Changes Everything"	David Trainer	Rachel Sweet	November 28, 2012	401	1.70
58	2	"A Midwinter Night's Sex Comedy"	David Trainer	Steve Joe	December 5, 2012	402	1.44
59	3	"Method Man"	David Trainer	Sebastian Jones	December 12, 2012	403	1.20
60	4	"GILFs"	David Trainer	Sam Johnson & Chris Marcil	December 19, 2012	404	1.21
61	5	"A Box Full of Puppies"	Dennis Capps	Suzanne Martin	December 26, 2012	405	1.34
62	6	"Cleveland Fantasy-Con"	Joe Regalbuto	Chuck Ranberg & Anne Flett-Giordano	January 2, 2013	406	1.15
63	7	"Magic Diet Candy"	Joe Regalbuto	Sebastian Jones	January 9, 2013	407	1.33
64	8	"Extras"	Andy Cadiff	Suzanne Martin	January 16, 2013	408	1.07
65	9	"The Conversation"	Andy Cadiff	Steve Joe	January 23, 2013	409	1.33
66	10	"The Anger Games"	Andy Cadiff	Sam Johnson & Chris Marcil	January 30, 2013	410	1.40
67	11	"Fast and Furious"	Andy Cadiff	Alex Herschlag	February 6, 2013	411	1.29
68	12	"What Now, My Love?"	David Trainer	Rachel Sweet	February 13, 2013	412	1.29
69	13	"It's Alive"	Andy Cadiff	Joe Keenan	June 19, 2013	413	1.69
70	14	"Canoga Falls"	Andy Cadiff	Sebastian Jones	June 26, 2013	421	1.34
71	15	"The Proposal"	Andy Cadiff	Chuck Ranberg & Anne Flett-Giordano	July 10, 2013	414	1.12
72	16	"Pony Up"	Andy Cadiff	Jessica Wood & Jameson Lyons	July 17, 2013	418	1.28
73	17	"No Glove, No Love"	Andy Cadiff	Alex Herschlag	July 24, 2013	417	1.12
74	18	"The Fixer"	Andy Cadiff	Chuck Ranberg & Anne Flett-Giordano	July 31, 2013	415	1.28
75	19	"Look Who's Hot Now"	N/A	N/A	August 7, 2013	422	1.31
76	20	"Cleveland Indians"	Andy Cadiff	Joe Keenan	August 14, 2013	416	1.20
77	21	"Corpse Bride"	Andy Cadiff	Lisa Slopey	August 21, 2013	419	1.28
78	22	"All My Exes"	Andy Cadiff	Sam Johnson & Chris Marcil	August 28, 2013	420	1.22
79	23	"Love Is All Around"	Andy Cadiff	Steve Joe	September 4, 2013	423	1.75
80	24	"The Man That Got Away"	Andy Cadiff	Rachel Sweet	September 4, 2013	424	1.90

=== Season 5 (2014) ===
No. overall	No. in season	Title	Directed by	Written by	Original release date	Prod. code	U.S. viewers (millions)
81	1	"Stayin' Alive"	Andy Cadiff	Laura Solon	March 26, 2014	519	1.35
82	2	"Surprise!"	Shelley Jensen	Sam Johnson & Chris Marcil	April 2, 2014	501	N/A
83	3	"Dr. Who?"	Shelley Jensen	Aaron Shure	April 9, 2014	502	1.21
84	4	"The Undead"	John Whitesell	Rachel Sweet	April 16, 2014	503	1.10
85	5	"Elka Takes a Lover"	John Whitesell	Laura Solon	April 23, 2014	504	1.02
86	6	"Rusty Banks Rides Again"	Andy Cadiff	Sebastian Jones	April 30, 2014	505	N/A
87	7	"The One with George Clooney"	Andy Cadiff	Suzanne Martin	May 7, 2014	506	N/A
88	8	"Brokeback Elka"	Andy Cadiff	Laura Solon	May 14, 2014	507	N/A
89	9	"Bad George Clooney"	Andy Cadiff	Sebastian Jones	June 4, 2014	509	0.87
90	10	"Bucket: We're Going to New York"	Andy Cadiff	Rachel Sweet	June 11, 2014	508	0.78
91	11	"Undercover Lovers"	Andy Cadiff	Jessica Wood & Jameson Lyons	June 18, 2014	511	N/A
92	12	"I Just Met the Man I'm Going to Marry"	Andy Cadiff	Aaron Shure	June 25, 2014	512	1.02
93	13	"People Feeding People"	Andy Cadiff	Alex Herschlag	July 2, 2014	513	N/A
94	14	"Murder House"	Andy Cadiff	Suzanne Martin	July 2, 2014	510	N/A
95	15	"Playmates"	Andy Cadiff	Aaron Shure	July 9, 2014	514	N/A
96	16	"Auction Heroes"	Anthony Rich	Suzanne Martin	July 16, 2014	515	N/A
97	17	"Straight Outta Cleveland"	Andy Cadiff	Jessica Wood & Jameson Lyons	July 23, 2014	518	0.89
98	18	"The Animated Episode"	Andy Cadiff	Sam Johnson & Chris Marcil	July 30, 2014	516	0.69
99	19	"Strange Bedfellows"	Anthony Rich	Rachel Sweet	August 6, 2014	517	1.00
100	20	"The Italian Job"	John Whitesell	Sebastian Jones	August 13, 2014	520	0.85
101	21	"Mystery Date: Oscar Edition"	Andy Cadiff	Alex Herschlag	August 20, 2014	521	0.76
102	22	"Win Win"	Andy Cadiff	Lisa Slopey	August 27, 2014	522	0.82
103	23	"Don Elka"	Andy Cadiff	Sam Johnson & Chris Marcil	September 3, 2014	523	0.84
104	24	"The Bachelors"	Andy Cadiff	Jameson Lyons & Lisa Slopey & Jessica Wood	September 10, 2014	524	0.91

=== Season 6 (2014–15) ===
No. overall	No. in season	Title	Directed by	Written by	Original release date	Prod. code	U.S. viewers (millions)
105	1	"Comfort and Joy"	John Whitesell	Rachel Sweet	November 5, 2014	601	0.66
106	2	"Fear and Loathing in Los Angeles"	John Whitesell	Michael A. Ross	November 12, 2014	602	0.77
107	3	"Bossy Cups"	Andy Cadiff	Lisa Slopey	November 19, 2014	603	0.72
108	4	"Naked and Afraid"	John Whitesell	Sebastian Jones	November 26, 2014	604	0.79
109	5	"Tazed and Confused"	Andy Cadiff	Jessica Wood	December 3, 2014	605	0.71
110	6	"Out of Our Minds"	Peter Filsinger	Laura Solon	December 10, 2014	606	0.92
111	7	"Cold in Cleveland: The Christmas Episode"	Andy Cadiff	Laura Solon	December 17, 2014	607	0.74
112	8	"The Young and the Restless"	Andy Cadiff	Cheryl Holliday	January 7, 2015	608	0.77
113	9	"Bad Boys"	Andy Cadiff	Cheryl Holliday	January 14, 2015	609	0.84
114	10	"We Could Be Royals"	Andy Cadiff	Sam Johnson & Chris Marcil	January 21, 2015	610	0.95
115	11	"About a Joy"	Peter Filsinger	Suzanne Martin	January 28, 2015	611	0.92
116	12	"One Wedding and One Funeral"	Andy Cadiff	Rachel Sweet	February 4, 2015	612	0.71
117	13	"Scandalous"	Phill Lewis	Lisa Slopey	March 18, 2015	613	0.86
118	14	"Family Affair"	Dennis Capps	Alex Herschlag	March 25, 2015	614	0.74
119	15	"All Dolled Up"	Andy Cadiff	Jessica Wood	April 1, 2015	615	0.82
120	16	"Bad Girlfriends"	Andy Cadiff	Michael A. Ross	April 8, 2015	616	0.77
121	17	"Duct Soup"	Andy Cadiff	Rachel Sweet	April 15, 2015	617	0.74
122	18	"Cleveland Calendar Girls"	Andy Cadiff	Cheryl Holliday	April 22, 2015	618	0.70
123	19	"Kitchen Nightmare"	Andy Cadiff	Sebastian Jones	April 29, 2015	619	0.66
124	20	"All About Elka"	Andy Cadiff	Laura Solon	May 6, 2015	620	0.70
125	21	"Say Yes to the Mess"	Andy Cadiff	Steve Vitolo & Jessica Poter	May 20, 2015	621	0.66
126	22	"Hot in Cleveland: Hot Damn!"	N/A	N/A	May 27, 2015	622	0.76
127	23	"Vegas Baby"	Andy Cadiff	Alex Herschlag, Sam Johnson, Chris Marcil & Suzanne Martin	June 3, 2015	623	1.02
128	24	"I Hate Goodbyes"	Andy Cadiff	Alex Herschlag, Sam Johnson, Chris Marcil & Suzanne Martin	June 3, 2015	624	1.02

== Specials ==
No.	Title	Original air date	Production code
1	"Behind the Hotness"	December 12, 2010	150
Valerie Bertinelli, Jane Leeves, Wendie Malick, and Betty White are joined by the many guest stars of season one and take a look back at the most fun moments of the first season of Hot in Cleveland and share a behind-the-scenes preview of the second season.
2	"Too Hot for TV"	August 10, 2011	218
Viewers are presented with various entertaining highlights and outtakes, featuring many of the most memorable moments from the season's previous episodes.
3	"Some Like It Hot"	May 9, 2012	322
Viewers are presented with an exclusive, behind-the-scenes look at the series, which features never-before-seen footage of the cast and crew.
4	"Look Who's Hot Now"	August 7, 2013	422
Kirstie Alley is visiting the Hot in Cleveland set and asks the cast for some advice for her new show Kirstie, which is being recorded next door.
5	"Hot in Cleveland: Hot Damn!"	May 27, 2015	622
The cast and crew discuss their favorite episodes, bloopers and behind-the-scenes moments.
