= Hot in Cleveland season 1 =

Hot in Cleveland
- Season 1
- DVD cover
- No. of episodes: 10

Release
- Original network: TV Land
- Original release: June 16 – August 18, 2010

Season chronology
- Next → Season 2

The first season of the Hot in Cleveland, an American situation comedy television series, aired in the United States on TV Land. The series was the channel's first venture into scripted television series. Created by television producer and writer Suzanne Martin, the show was produced by Hazy Mills Productions, SamJen Productions, TV Land Original Productions while Martin, Sean Hayes, Todd Milliner, Lynda Obst, Larry W. Jones, and Keith Cox served as executive producers. The show focuses on three women from Los Angeles who unexpectedly crash land in Cleveland, Ohio and, enthralled by the attention they receive, decide to move there. The series stars Valerie Bertinelli, Wendie Malick and Jane Leeves as the three Los Angeles women Melanie Moretti, Victoria Chase, and Joy Scroggs. Veteran actress Betty White also stars in the series as Elka Ovstrosky, the women's sassy caretaker. The season also featured numerous guest stars, including John Schneider, Susan Lucci, Carl Reiner and Joe Jonas.

Consisting of ten episodes, the first season aired from June 16 to August 18, 2010 on Wednesdays at 10:00 p.m. EST. The series debuted to 4.75 million viewers, becoming the most watched program on the channel and more than quintupling their viewership. The season ended with the finale "Tornado", which attracted 3.40 million viewers. The season averaged 3.12 million viewers per episode and a 0.8 Nielsen rating. Hot in Cleveland also aired in Australia, Canada, New Zealand, and the United Kingdom to ratings success. Critical reception for the series was positive, with many television critics praising the main cast's performance, most notably White, and the series as "well-acted" and "funny." Hot in Cleveland also garnered several comparisons to the 1980s NBC sitcom The Golden Girls, which White also starred in.

The entire season was released on DVD in Region 1 on January 11, 2011, Region 2 on April 25, 2011, and Region 4 on February 17, 2011.

== Plot ==
The series begins with trio of single women living in Los Angeles – minorly successful writer Melanie Moretti, whose children are in college and who is going through a divorce, Victoria Chase, a soap opera and Lifetime movie actress best known for portraying Honor St. Raven on the recently cancelled soap opera drama Edge of Tomorrow, and British beautician and LA celebrity eyebrow specialist Joy Scroggs – boarding a plane headed for Paris for a vacation to do some actions outlined on Melanie's newest book "200 Things Every Woman Should Do Before She Dies". On the plane, Melanie runs into her estranged husband Anders, who is on vacation with his new fiancee, Kim, the woman he cheated on Melanie with during their marriage. As she sulks on the plane and is comforted by her friends, a lightning storm causes the plane to make an emergency landing in Cleveland.

Upon arriving at a Cleveland bar, the women are fascinated when men look at and start hitting on them. They talk with a trio of men, one of whom, Hank, shows Melanie the sights of Cleveland and sleeps with her. Melanie then impulsively decides to move to Cleveland, despite Joy and Victoria warning her not to. She rents a cottage, which comes with a Polish caretaker, Elka Ostrovsky, a sassy elderly woman with a storied life and an instant dislike of Joy. Melanie goes out on another date with Hank, who Joy and Victoria discover is married. They interrupt the date to call him out on his actions. Melanie ultimately decides to stay in Cleveland to reinvent herself, with Joy and Victoria deciding to stay with her after their failed careers: Victoria discovering that she is only landing grandmother parts and Joy discovering that her clients are using other beauticians for their eyebrows instead of her. The women decide to go pick up guys, where Elka immediately goes as well. In the next episode, it is revealed that Elka got phone numbers from three guys at the bar, and Melanie helps her choose a guy for her first date since her husband's death.

The second episode introduces a personal storyline for Joy, as it is revealed that as a teenager she gave birth to a son, whom she gave up for adoption shortly afterwards. This information the girls reveal to Elka after Joy's younger date makes references to his country of birth and his birth date, making her worried that she is dating her long-lost son. Joy tries to get a DNA sample so she can find out if she is his mother, but he reveals he found his birth mother recently, and breaks up with her. After Victoria goes to the local Big N Easy store to buy many products in bulk and seek a place to vent about her show's cancellation and Melanie Googles photos of Anders and Kim in Paris, the two decide they need to find a way to get closure with their past. Joy cautiously decides to try to track down her son, using an ancestry website online.

The third episode introduces the girls' annual celebration of birthdays on the same day. This becomes known at "Birthdates" when Elka suggests that the three women get each other dates for their birthday, which they agree to do, adding Elka to the tradition. While the other three women are stuck with bad dates with major flaws, Elka's date with Max Miller is more successful and they end up quickly getting engaged during their date. Though Elka does briefly manage to cheat on Max with a fellow senior named Nick during a seniors' dance, she ultimately rebuffs Nick and stays with Max.

The season revolves around Melanie, Joy and Victoria adjusting to life in Cleveland. Melanie throws a party and meets their neighbour Rick, who turns out to hit on the girls relentlessly. Her son Will also comes to visit her, but isn't happy with her meddling in his personal life when she accidentally ruins his secret engagement; though Joy, who is going through a mid-life crisis and is seeing various therapists, helps them reconcile. Victoria runs into an old flame, Johnny Revere, at an event at the Rock and Roll Hall of Fame, and intends to humiliate him for dumping her for no apparent reason, but finds that she cannot, though is surprised when he apologizes to her later. Victoria states that him being a rebel is what she liked about him and they try to recreate the sex they had when they were younger; though after they injure themselves while doing it, they ultimately concede that they are growing up and after sleeping together, part on good terms. Victoria later meets a fan in a high school student and becomes a drama teacher after coaching a school production of Romeo and Juliet, a job she decides to keep at least until her next acting project. Elka later helps her fake an illness to secure her a nomination for the Daytime Emmy Awards, allowing her a chance to beat her longtime soap opera rival Susan Lucci.

While visiting her daughter in New York City to watch her play before a blind date, Melanie runs into Anders again. As the blind date gets cancelled, she and Anders end up making out and he follows her to Cleveland, saying that he and Kim are having relationship problems. She agrees to go out on one dinner date with him, but the day after, Anders tells Victoria and Joy that he has decided to go back home to LA to reconcile with Kim. Furious at Anders but wanting Melanie to have full closure from her marriage, Victoria and Joy convince Anders to let Melanie dump him this time round so she doesn't get hurt. However, just after he leaves and Melanie feels guilty for doing it to him, Victoria and Joy tell her the truth; causing her to rush to the airport to find Anders. She manages to catch up to Anders at baggage check and tells him how she feels – in a profanity-laced telling off berating him for his actions towards her and Kim. Shortly after this incident, Melanie declares she is done with her marriage and throws away her wedding ring; which lands near a police officer named Pete. The two begin talking and eventually begin going out. However, this disturbs everyone else in the house due to their loud sex and overly cheesy affection towards each other, and eventually Joy feels left out when Melanie ends up ignoring her plans with her to spend time with Pete, leading to an incident where Joy accidentally waxes off Melanie's eyebrow while helping her get ready for another date. Elka tells Melanie off for ignoring her friendship with Joy, leading her to apologize to her.

The season finale takes place during a tornado, where the girls hide in the house's storm cellar only to find a large array of stolen antique furniture. Elka states that it was stolen by her late husband, whom she discovered after his death was a fence for the mob. All of it was polished with Elka's special Polish blend containing herbs, thus explaining the marijuana smell on her when they first met. The girls pass the time by complaining about their own situations: Victoria is unable to make it to the Daytime Emmy Awards to potentially beat Lucci, Joy is contacted by her son who wants to meet her but she is unable to contact him due to the communications being knocked out, and Melanie reveals she accidentally said "I love you" to Pete and does not know if he feels the same way. After the girls watch Lucci accept Victoria's Emmy on her behalf on TV, Pete arrives at the cellar to make sure Melanie is okay, when he is distracted upon seeing Elka and the furniture. The season ends with Elka getting arrested and going to jail.

== Production ==
Hot in Cleveland is TV Land's first venture into scripted comedy and is produced by Sean Hayes's Hazy Mills Productions and created by Suzanne Martin, who also serves as the showrunner. Hayes and Martin, along with Lynda Obst, Larry W. Jones, and Keith Cox, serve as the series' executive producers. Staff writers employed for the season include Martin, Liz Feldman, Anne Flett-Giordano, writing and production duo Sam Johnson and Chris Marcil, Vanessa McCarthy, and Chuck Ranberg. Andy Cadiff, Gil Junger, Michael Lembeck and David Trainer were hired as directors for the season's episodes. The series is shot with a multicamera setup in front of a live studio audience at the CBS Studio City soundstage.

== Cast ==
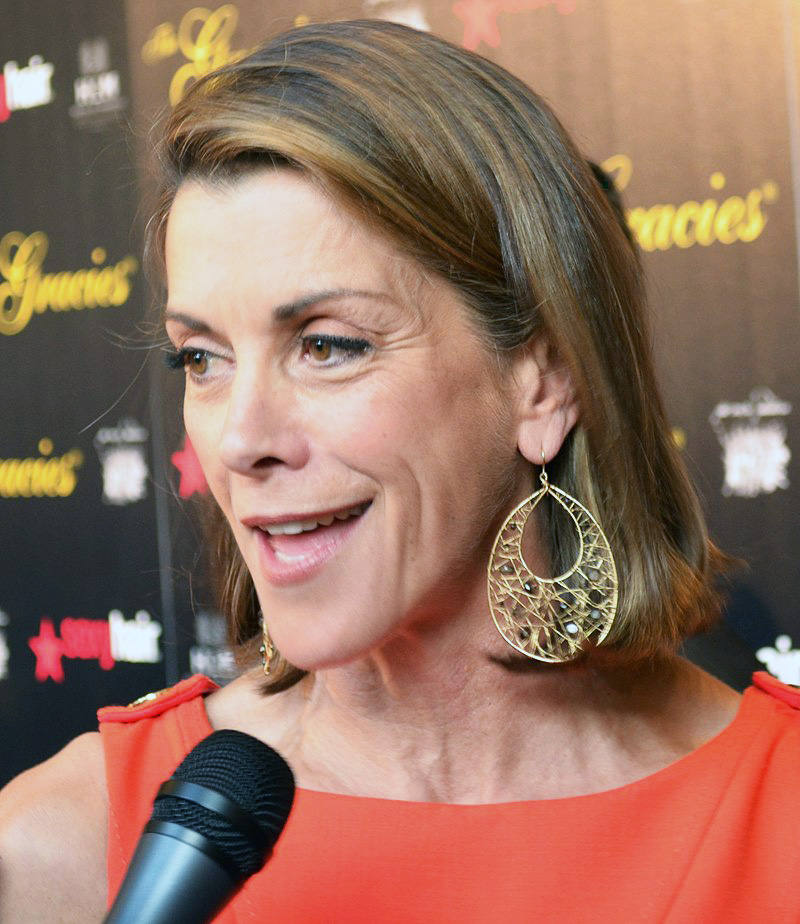
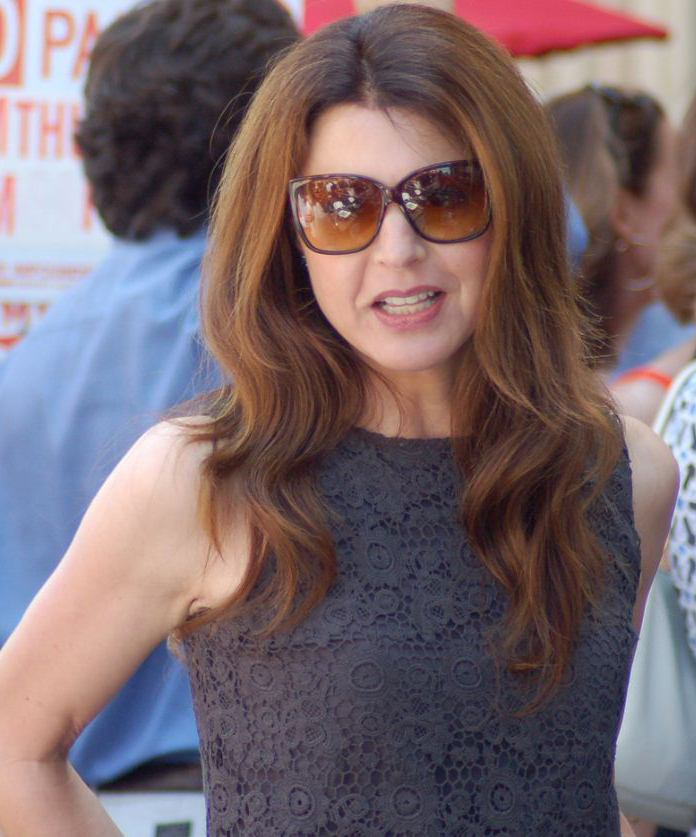
Wendie Malick and Jane Leeves, who portray main characters Victoria Chase and Joy Scroggs, once appeared in Frasier together.

The series employs a regular of four main actors. Valerie Bertinelli portrays Melanie Moretti, the girl-next-door and best-selling author. Jane Leeves portrayed Rejoyla "Joy" Scroggs, a British born beautician who is cynical and suspicious of everyone. Wendie Malick played Victoria Chase, a vain veteran actress from a recently cancelled soap opera television series who longs for the fame she once experienced. Betty White plays Elka Ostrovsky, a sassy elderly caretaker with a renewed sex life and a general dislike of Joy. In keeping with the theme of TV Land, the cast is composed of actors who appeared in sitcoms that were syndicated on the network. Bertinelli appeared in the 1970 sitcom One Day at a Time (1975). Leeves starred in the Cheers spinoff Frasier (1993). Malick starred in the late 1990s NBC sitcom Just Shoot Me! (1997). White starred in the 1980s NBC hit sitcom The Golden Girls (1985).

During the season, the series employed a number of guest stars some of which appeared in more than one episode. Actor Carl Reiner guest starred as Max, Elka's boyfriend, in three episodes. David Starzyk portrayed Pete, a police officer who becomes romantically involved with Melanie. Bil Dwyer played Melanie's ex-husband Anders in two episodes. The pilot episode featured Tim Bagley as the realtor selling Melanie the house and John Schneider as Hank, a guy Melanie sleeps with on her first night in Cleveland. Actor Robert Gant appears in "Birthdates" as a blind date for Joy, who looks like a wanted killer. In the episode "The Sex That Got Away", musician Huey Lewis portrays rock legend and Victoria's former flame Johnny Revere while Amy Yasbeck portrays Hailey Nash, Melanie's favorite singer with whom she has an uncomfortable encounter. Wayne Knight appeared in "Good Neighbors" as the ladies neighbor Rick. "Meet the Parents" featured veteran actors Shirley Knight, Hal Linden and Juliet Mills portraying Melanie's mother Loretta, Victoria's father Alex and Joy's mother Philippa. Comedian and actor Tim Conway appears in "It's Not That Complicated" as Nick, a man fighting for Elka's love. The episode "The Play's the Thing" features guest actors Gary Anthony Williams and Mark Indelicato portraying Coach Taylor and Zach, a fan of Victoria, respectively. Singer-songwriter Joe Jonas appeared in the episode "Good Luck Faking the Goiter" as Melanie's son Will. Dave Foley also guest stars as Dr. Moore, an expert on the disease that Victoria claims to have. Soap opera actress Susan Lucci guest starred in the season finale "Tornado" as a fictionalized version of herself and Victoria's rival.

=== Main ===
- Valerie Bertinelli as Melanie Moretti
- Jane Leeves as Rejoyla "Joy" Scroggs
- Wendie Malick as Victoria Chase
- Betty White as Elka Ostrovsky

=== Recurring ===
- Carl Reiner as Max
- David Starzyk as Pete

=== Special guest stars ===
- Huey Lewis as Johnny Revere
- Wayne Knight as Rick
- Hal Linden as Alex Chase
- Juliet Mills as Philipa Scroggs
- Shirley Knight as Loretta Moretti
- Joe Jonas as Will
- Dave Foley as Dr. Moore
- Susan Lucci as herself

=== Guest stars ===
- John Schneider as Hank Szymborska
- Tim Bagley as Larry
- David Giuntoli as Tyler
- Jack Donner as Arthur
- D.W. Moffett as Chester
- George Newbern as Bill
- Robert Gant as Steve
- Amy Yasbeck as Hailey Nash
- Robin Thede as Janet
- Bil Dwyer as Anders
- Tim Conway as Nick
- Nicole Randall Johnson as Eleanor
- Mark Indelicato as Zack
- Gary Anthony Williams as Coach Taylor
- Chelsea Ricketts as Francesca
- Carole Gutierrez as Dr. Hernandez

== Reception ==
=== Viewership and ratings ===
The pilot episode for Hot in Cleveland premiered on TV Land on June 16, 2010 to 4.75 million viewers. The broadcast earned several distinctions for the network, including increasing viewership of the channel and garnering the highest ratings in the adults 18-49 and women aged 25–54 demographic. The season ended with the finale "Tornado", which was viewed by 3.40 million viewers. The season held an average of over 3.12 million viewers and a 0.8 Nielsen rating. The season's viewership average was more than four times the average of another original series on TV Land, Harry Loves Lisa, which had an average of 731,000 viewers.

In Canada, the series debuted on July 5, 2010 to 1.82 million viewers. The season ended on September 23, 2010 with 1.59 million viewers tuning in to the finale. In the United Kingdom, the first season of Hot in Cleveland aired on the Sky Living network and ranked among the top ten most-watched programs on the network each weak, with its peak viewership at 347,000 viewers. Hot in Cleveland's first season aired in Australia on the Nine Network during the summer of 2010. Each episode ranked within the top twenty most-watched programs on Monday nights, acquiring between 800,000 and 1.3 million viewers. In New Zealand, the season aired on TV2 more a year after its broadcast in the United States. The season averaged over 457,000 viewers per episode.

=== Critical reviews ===
Upon the premiere of the pilot episode, Hot in Cleveland received positive reviews from television critics. On the review aggregator website Rotten Tomatoes, 73% of 30 critics' reviews are positive. The website's consensus reads: "Hot in Cleveland is a proud throwback to the classic sitcoms of the '80s whose more off-putting moments are made watchable by Betty White's pitch-perfect comic delivery and Valerie Bertinelli's lovable charm." Metacritic, which uses a weighted average, assigned the film a score of 66 out of 100, based on 28 critics, indicating "generally favorable" reviews.

Scott D. Pierce of Deseret News called the pilot "bright, funny and witty" while drawing comparisons to the 1980s NBC sitcom The Golden Girls. Philadelphia Inquirer writer Jonathan Storm deemed the series "funny and fresh" while noting that the actresses "appear to be having the time of their lives." Television columnist Brian Lowry, writing for Variety, spoke positively about the series, lauding the actresses performance and the comedic material utilized. Lowry added that the series "feels as though it could have been on a network lineup 20 years ago, which is surprisingly better than that sounds." Verne Gay, writing for Newsday, called the series "by-the-numbers sitcom with a couple of laughs, an inoffensive premise and four seasoned actresses who make the material much better than it is." Gay notably highlighted White's performance in the series, calling her timing "impeccable" and her "deadpan delivery flawless." TV Guide columnist Matt Roush had a less positive view about the series, writing "I simply hope Hot in Cleveland can give us more than the lukewarm pilot promises. Ohio deserves better, and so do these fabulous ladies."

The full season later went on receive positive reviews. Nick Hartel of DVD Talk deemed the season release as "Recommended". Praising the actresses performances and the mixture of "old sitcom shenanigans" with "a dose of the modern", Hartel called the series "a pleasant, well-acted, old-school sitcom" and "a series that those in need of a good laugh should check out." DVD Verdict writer Brett Cullum deemed the series "giddy silly fun with a rock solid cast and a star who's almost ninety years old." The staff at Us Weekly gave the season 3 and a half stars, writing that "Sitcom pros Valerie Bertinelli, Wendie Malick and Jane Leeves clearly relish the chance to play rare TV characters -- clever, single middle-aged women -- in this sly series that just gets funnier." Zap2it writer Jay Robbins, writing for Los Angeles Times, praised the lead actresses performances in the season and called White "today's ultimate secret weapon for media success." Troy Patterson of Slate Magazine opined that "The only truly original thing about the show is that its humor feels pitched at an extremely strange audience: Its ideal viewer would seem to have developed all her expectations of what comedy is from watching traditional sitcoms and yet to have no memory of hearing these jokes the first 20 times around."

== Episodes ==
No. overall	No. in season	Title	Directed by	Written by	Original release date	Prod. code	U.S. viewers (millions)
1	1	"Pilot"	Michael Lembeck	Suzanne Martin	June 16, 2010	101	4.75
Three friends from Los Angeles named Melanie (Valerie Bertinelli), Joy (Jane Leeves) and Victoria (Wendie Malick) board a plane to Paris only to run into Melanie's estranged husband Anders, who is newly-engaged to another woman. Just as Melanie is devastated, a lightning storm causes the plane to make an emergency landing in Cleveland, Ohio. As the three women arrive in a bar where men immediately start hitting on them, they immediately begin to like the strange, unpretentious city and talk to three particular suitors. The next morning, after going sightseeing with one of the men, Hank (John Schneider), and sleeping with him, Melanie immediately decides she wants to move to Cleveland, much to Joy's and Victoria's concerns as they are supposed to fly out to Paris the following morning. Melanie also rents a cottage on a month-to-month lease, but along with the cottage comes a caretaker named Elka (Betty White), a sassy elderly woman who takes an immediate dislike to Joy and criticizes Victoria's acting career. Just as Hank and Melanie go on another date, an even more concerned Joy and Victoria research him online and find out that he is married, and interrupt his date with Melanie to call him out on his behaviour before comforting her. Melanie, although upset about what Hank did to her, still wants to stay in Cleveland to reinvent herself, and is happy to let Joy and Victoria go off to Paris. However, they decide to stay in the city with Melanie for two weeks instead, unhappy with the state of their careers. They happily decide to go back to the bar to pick up guys again, Elka immediately volunteering to drive them there.
2	2	"Who's Your Mama?"	Andy Cadiff	Suzanne Martin	June 23, 2010	102	3.37
While at the bar immediately following the events of the pilot, Joy is picked up by a younger man (David Giuntoli), Elka gains the phone numbers of three elderly suitors, and the next morning Melanie happily begins extending her lease to the house for a permanent move to Cleveland. When Joy's date makes reference to her birth country and his birth date, she realizes he could possibly be the son she put up for adoption when she was a teenager. During their second date, she "accidentally" elbows him in the nose and collects his blood in a napkin for a DNA test, though he soon after reveals that he had already found his biological mother ten years previously. This prompts Joy to start thinking about finding her own long-lost son. Elka is unsure of which of her three men to date, and Melanie tries to help her decide. Her first choice, Larry, ends up dead before she could call him, so she hesitantly goes out on a date with her second choice, Sal (Jack Donner), on a double date with Melanie and Sal's friend, who keeps inappropriately hitting on Melanie. Meanwhile, on Elka's suggestion, Victoria starts shopping at the local Big N Easy, and brings home several items in bulk on a daily basis. When Melanie and Joy stage an intervention, they find out that she also wanted a place to vent about her TV show's cancellation.
3	3	"Birthdates"	Andy Cadiff	Vanessa McCarthy	June 30, 2010	103	3.07
Elka learns that Melanie, Joy and Victoria have chosen a neutral day so that they can celebrate their birthdays. She suggests that they girls all get dates for each other for their birthdays and she joins in as well. The girls each pick a date for one another. Elka has more luck with her date (Carl Reiner) and announces her engagement. Victoria's date with Chester (D. W. Moffett) goes well until she finds out he has man-breasts. Meanwhile, Victoria sets Joy up with a guy (Robert Gant) who bears a frightening resemblance to a wanted murderer, and Melanie's date (George Newbern) keeps associating her with his dead wife.
4	4	"The Sex That Got Away"	David Trainer	Anne Flett-Giordano & Chuck Ranberg	July 7, 2010	105	2.93
A legendary rock singer (Huey Lewis), who was also a former flame of Victoria's, shows up in Cleveland for an event at the Rock and Roll Hall of Fame. Meanwhile, Melanie tries to apologize to her favorite singer (Amy Yasbeck) after she continuously bump into her breasts. Little does she know that when the singer shows up to accept the apology, Melanie is about to get more than just a CD and forgiveness.
5	5	"Good Neighbors"	David Trainer	Sam Johnson & Chris Marcil	July 14, 2010	106	2.99
Melanie throws a party to meet some new friends and comes off as insulting to one of her next-door neighbors (Wayne Knight), a columnist for The Plain Dealer, leading Melanie to fear that he'll write something negative about her. Meanwhile, Victoria is excited over getting an offer to do a commercial in Japan, only to find out it is for adult underpants. Elka sports a dyed hairdo that draws criticism from Joy.
6	6	"Meet the Parents"	Andy Cadiff	Liz Feldman	July 21, 2010	104	2.44
It's a family reunion the trio would rather forget when Melanie's overprotective mother Loretta (Shirley Knight), Victoria's womanizing actor father Alex (Hal Linden) and Joy's criticizing mother Philippa (Juliet Mills), who just became Elka's new buddy via the internet, pay the ladies a visit. And that is just the beginning when Melanie and Victoria, respectively suggesting that Loretta take risks and Alex date more age-appropriate women, find their parents together in bed... and Melanie knows Loretta is still married.
7	7	"It's Not That Complicated"	David Trainer	Anne Flett-Giordano & Chuck Ranberg	July 28, 2010	107	2.97
During a visit to New York City to see her daughter perform on Broadway, Melanie runs into her ex-husband Anders (Bil Dwyer), who follows her back to Cleveland claiming that he and his new girlfriend Kim have broken up. Joy and Victoria are skeptical of this reconciliation and learn the real reason why Anders wanted to get back with Melanie, who is left believing that he wants to be with her again. Meanwhile, Elka is caught in a love triangle between Max (Carl Reiner) and Nick (Tim Conway).
8	8	"The Play's the Thing"	Gil Junger	Sam Johnson & Chris Marcil	August 4, 2010	108	2.57
Melanie's romance with her cop boyfriend Pete (David Starzyk) is annoying Joy, Victoria and Elka in more ways than one. Meanwhile, Victoria meets a young fan (Mark Indelicato), who wants her to help out with his school production of "Romeo & Juliet" because their new drama teacher is also the soccer coach and is treating them like a sports team.
9	9	"Good Luck Faking the Goiter"	Gil Junger	Suzanne Martin	August 11, 2010	109	2.72
When Melanie's secretive son Will (Joe Jonas) comes to visit on his way back to college, she invades his privacy and learns a little too much when she discovers that he did not tell her about getting engaged. She uses his cell phone to text his girlfriend by pretending to be Will, resulting in their break up. Meanwhile, when Victoria is nominated for an Emmy, Elka helps her fake a deadly disease to gain sympathy and votes. However, Victoria learns that faking the disease is not an act at all when members of a charitable organization dedicated to the disease stop by. Joy, believing that she is experiencing a mid-life crisis, tries seeking therapy...by going to different therapists; using this experience she is able to help Will and Melanie reconnect.
10	10	"Tornado"	Gil Junger	Vanessa McCarthy	August 18, 2010	110	3.40
A tornado hits Cleveland and the women find something shocking in the storm cellar as they discover that Elka has been hiding a roomful of stolen goods for years. While they all ride out the storm, Melanie starts to worry about Pete and if he really loved her; Joy deals with a date (Rand Holdren) and gets a surprise text from her son; Victoria worries that she will miss her final chance to win her first Daytime Emmy Award in which she is up against rival Susan Lucci. At the end of the episode, Elka goes to jail. Special guest star Susan Lucci.

== Ratings ==
=== United States ratings ===
No. in series	No. in season	Episode	Air date	Time slot (EST)	18-49 demo		Viewers (millions)	Weekly rank (viewers)
No. in series	No. in season	Episode	Air date	Time slot (EST)	Rating	Share	Viewers (millions)	Weekly rank (viewers)
1	1	Pilot	June 16, 2010	Wednesdays; 10:00 P.M.	1.2	4	4.75	#7
2	2	Who's Your Mama?	June 23, 2010	Wednesdays; 10:00 P.M.	0.9	3	3.37	#46
3	3	Birthdates	June 30, 2010	Wednesdays; 10:00 P.M.	0.9	3	3.07	#40
4	4	The Sex That Got Away	July 7, 2010	Wednesdays; 10:00 P.M.	0.8	2	2.94	#64
5	5	Good Neighbors	July 14, 2010	Wednesdays; 10:00 P.M.	0.8	3	2.99	—N/a
6	6	Meet the Parents	July 21, 2010	Wednesdays; 10:00 P.M.	0.7	2	2.44	—N/a
7	7	It's Not That Complicated	July 28, 2010	Wednesdays; 10:00 P.M.	0.9	3	2.97	—N/a
8	8	The Play's the Thing	August 4, 2010	Wednesdays; 10:00 P.M.	0.6	2	2.57	—N/a
9	9	Good Luck Faking the Goiter	August 11, 2010	Wednesdays; 10:00 P.M.	0.7	2	2.77	—N/a
10	10	Tornado	August 18, 2010	Wednesdays; 10:00 P.M.	0.9	3	3.40	—N/a

=== Canadian ratings ===
No. in series	No. in season	Episode title	Air date	Time slot (EST)	Viewers (millions)	Weekly rank	Ref
1	1	Pilot	July 5, 2010	Mondays; 8:00 P.M.	1.819	#7	
2	2	Who's Your Mama?	July 12, 2010	Mondays; 8:00 P.M.	1.458	#9	
3	3	Birthdates	July 19, 2010	Mondays; 8:00 P.M.	1.646	#4	
4	4	The Sex That Got Away	July 26, 2010	Mondays; 8:00 P.M.	1.398	#7	
5	5	Good Neighbors	August 2, 2010	Mondays; 8:00 P.M.	1.217	#11	
6	6	Meet the Parents	August 9, 2010	Mondays; 8:00 P.M.	1.833	#3	
7	7	It's Not That Complicated	August 23, 2010	Mondays; 8:00 P.M.	1.090	#19	
8	8	The Play's the Thing	August 30, 2010	Mondays; 8:00 P.M.	1.283	#13	
9	9	Good Luck Faking the Goiter	September 6, 2010	Mondays; 8:00 P.M.	1.653	#3	
10	10	Tornado	September 13, 2010	Mondays; 8:00 P.M.	1.594	#9	

=== United Kingdom ratings ===
All viewing figures and ranks are sourced from BARB.

No. in series	No. in season	Episode title	Air date	Time slot (UTC)	Sky Living Viewers (millions)	Sky Living Rank
1	1	Pilot	February 15, 2011	Tuesdays; 8:30 pm	0.272	#7
2	2	Who's Your Mama?	February 22, 2011	Tuesdays; 8:30 pm	0.347	#6
3	3	Birthdates	March 1, 2011	Tuesdays; 8:30 pm	0.282	#8
4	4	The Sex That Got Away	March 8, 2011	Tuesdays; 8:30 pm	0.228	#7
5	5	Good Neighbors	March 15, 2011	Tuesdays; 8:30 pm	0.188	#7
6	6	Meet the Parents	March 22, 2011	Tuesdays; 8:30 pm	0.222	#10
7	7	It's Not That Complicated	March 29, 2011	Tuesdays; 8:30 pm	0.201	#8
8	8	The Play's the Thing	April 5, 2011	Tuesdays; 8:30 pm	0.223	#7
9	9	Good Luck Faking the Goiter	April 12, 2011	Tuesdays; 8:30 pm	0.230	#8
10	10	Tornado	April 19, 2011	Tuesdays; 8:30 pm	0.261	#7

=== Australian ratings ===
No. in series	No. in season	Episode title	Air date	Time slot	Viewers (millions)	Rank		Ref
No. in series	No. in season	Episode title	Air date	Time slot	Viewers (millions)	Nightly	Weekly	Ref
1	1	Pilot	July 26, 2010	Mondays; 8:00 P.M.	1.27	#6	#19	
2	2	Who's Your Mama?	August 2, 2010	Mondays; 8:00 P.M.	1.13	#9	#29	
3	3	Birthdates	August 9, 2010	Mondays; 8:00 P.M.	0.84	#6	#66	
4	4	The Sex That Got Away	August 16, 2010	Mondays; 8:00 P.M.	0.99	#12	#39	
5	5	Good Neighbors	August 23, 2010	Mondays; 8:00 P.M.	1.02	#12	#38	
6	6	Meet the Parents	August 30, 2010	Mondays; 8:00 P.M.	0.84	#18	#62	
7	7	It's Not That Complicated	September 6, 2010	Mondays; 8:00 P.M.	0.81	#19	#57	
8	8	The Play's the Thing	September 13, 2010	Mondays; 8:00 P.M.	0.93	#12	#45	
9	9	Good Luck Faking the Goiter	September 20, 2010	Mondays; 8:00 P.M.	0.80	#16	#59	
10	10	Tornado	September 27, 2010	Mondays; 8:00 P.M.	0.88	#18	#63	

== DVD release ==
Hot in Cleveland: Season One
Set details		Special features
10 episodes; 2-disc set (DVD); 1.85:1 aspect ratio; English: Dolby Digital 5.1, Dolby Digital Stereo		Featurettes; "We Love Our Age"; "How'd They Get So Hot? Wardrobe On The Set"; Set Tour; Victoria's Full-Length Japanese "Lady-Pants" Commercial; Full length pilot episode; Retired at 35 pilot; Bloopers
DVD release date
Region 1	Region 2	Region 4
January 11, 2011	April 25, 2011	February 17, 2011
