= Hot in Cleveland season 4 =

Hot in Cleveland
- Season 4
- DVD cover
- No. of episodes: 24

Release
- Original network: TV Land
- Original release: November 28, 2012 – September 4, 2013

Season chronology
- ← Previous; Season 3 Next → Season 5

The fourth season of the TV Land original sitcom Hot in Cleveland premiered on November 28, 2012 and concluded September 4, 2013. It consisted of 24 episodes, split into 12-episode winter and summer segments. The series stars Valerie Bertinelli, Wendie Malick, Jane Leeves, and Betty White.

== Plot ==
Picking up from where the last season's cliffhanger left off, the baby left on the girls' doorstep turns out to be Wilbur, Owen's son from a one-night stand. Although Owen seemingly decides to put him up for adoption as he doesn't know how to raise him, it's a decision neither he nor the girls are happy with, and Elka's new boyfriend Pierre calls them out on it. Joy then offers to help Owen raise his son if he relocates permanently to Cleveland, which he agrees to. This storyline spawns several more season-long storylines; while Victoria babysits Wilbur and takes him to a baby audition, she manages to land a leading part in a movie directed by Woody Allen. After having somehow misplaced the baby on the way back, the girls go back to the movie studio retrieve him. Whilst there, Melanie reprimands a spiteful actress and talks about the perks of living in Cleveland, which gets her noticed by PR director Chloe, who gives her a job at a PR firm. Things soon get complicated when Melanie finds out that her new boss, Alec, who she ends up falling in love with, is Chloe's ex-husband, and Melanie finds herself trying to control her feelings for Alec as Chloe is still in love with and wants to get back together with him even though he is dating someone else and is preparing to go on vacation with his new girlfriend. To cope, Melanie invents a lie involving a fake boyfriend, actor Emmett Lawson. However, after the encounter with Emmett in person, Alec overhears Melanie's reaction and realizes that she lied and has feelings for him, which Melanie doesn't realize he did until he's gone and Victoria points it out. After several attempts to clarify herself to Alec while he is on vacation, Melanie is surprised when Alec returns and admits that he has feelings for her, though he insists that Chloe shouldn't know yet. However, he accidentally blurts it out while Melanie is trying to save Chloe from falling off the ledge of the workplace building. Chloe accepts the relationship and leaves the firm, and Melanie and Alec begin to form a stable relationship. Eventually, Melanie begins to wonder where their relationship is going when Alec keeps returning her toothbrush that she left at his apartment. After much discussion, they decide to move in together, and Melanie moves out of the house into Alec's apartment.

Speaking of Emmett, who is Victoria's co-star in her movie, although she is suspicious of his motives, the two develop chemistry between each other, especially when rumors circulate of a secret relationship between them. Although they initially play along with the false rumors, this relationship quickly becomes real as the two fall in love with each other. The relationship is cemented near the end of filming, when Emmett invites Victoria on a romantic trip to Morocco with him after filming concludes. On the night of their departure, Emmett plans to propose to Victoria. However, just as he does so, police officers arrest him for tax fraud, which Emmett's business manager had committed under shady deals for which Emmett blindly signed contracts which implicated him as well. Victoria nevertheless accepts his proposal, and hires a wedding planner for their wedding in prison. However, she struggles to cope with the fact that Emmett is in jail and does not know how long he will be there. On the day of her bachelorette party, she suffers an accident and takes it as a sign she needs to figure out what went wrong in her previous marriages before she marries Emmett. After condescending advice from most of her exes, the one ex who truly broke her heart tells her that she puts emotional walls up around the people she loves most and makes them feel like they are not needed when they need to be. Realizing that he is right and fearing she will do this to Emmett, Victoria decides to break off her engagement to him, but Melanie and Joy stop her from doing so, noting that she is already open and happy with him. After Victoria realizes she needs Emmett, she decides to stay with him.

Realizing she wants to set a good example for her grandson, Joy decides to enrol at college, taking up a course in economics. However she quickly feels left out of place due to her age, especially upon learning that Elka goes to the same college and is one of the popular kids, though Elka hesitantly helps her feel more welcome at the college. A storyline running in parallel with this is the fact that Elka and her friend Mamie-Sue are running a shady venture together. Although Joy is suspicious of this when she sees the cash Elka has been hiding, she doesn't find out more information until she takes an internship at a private investigation firm run by Detective Bob Moore. They both spy on Elka where she hands out pills to a crowd of strangers for cash, and then Joy confronts Elka on seeing the stash of drugs in the oven, where Elka confesses that she and Mamie are running an illegal drug business. Although Joy contemplates turning in Elka to the police, she ultimately decides to help Elka and Mamie quickly sell off all of their unsold drug stock (including the large inventory in the basement), with the help of Victoria and Melanie. Their efforts occur as part of the show's first live episode, where they successfully manage to do so as well as avoid trouble with a former drug lord and a major mob boss.

Also, when Joy's mother Philippa is visiting Cleveland for Wilbur's christening, Joy asks Owen to lie about his entire life to appease her mother. When both begin to slip on the lie, a huge argument breaks out during the christening, when Philippa reveals that the man who got Joy pregnant was planning to propose but that she made him leave instead, believing he wasn't right for Joy. Whilst Joy is initially furious with Philippa because of the revelation, she eventually agrees that what her mother did was for the best, and that it wouldn't have worked out anyway. When Joy celebrates Wilbur's birthday, this causes Melanie and Alec to think about the idea of having kids together. Although Alec is eager to raise kids, Melanie is concerned that she is too old for motherhood and they decide to shelve the idea. However, Melanie later decides to break up with Alec to give him a chance at fatherhood, and she quits her job and moves out of his apartment and back into the house with the girls.

On their wedding day, due to the new prison warden's budget and security constraints, Victoria and Emmett marry in a small prison cell ceremony, with an ordained minister, though on their wedding night in a private prison trailer, Emmett reveals that more charges have been filed against him that could see him incarcerated for up to ten years. Meanwhile, the minister, a man working at press magazine who Victoria arranged to secretly photograph the wedding, turns out to be Simon, the man who left Joy while she was pregnant with Owen. Though Joy is angry with him for abandoning her, Simon expresses regret over this and reconciles with Joy, vowing to return soon to be there for her and their family. The season ends on a double cliffhanger as Victoria wakes up to find Emmett gone and Melanie is stunned to find out that she is pregnant.

== Cast ==
=== Main ===
- Valerie Bertinelli as Melanie Moretti
- Jane Leeves as Rejoyla "Joy" Scroggs
- Wendie Malick as Victoria Chase
- Betty White as Elka Ostrovsky

=== Recurring ===
- Georgia Engel as Mamie Sue Johnson
- Jay Harrington as Alec
- Michael McMillian as Owen
- Alan Dale as Emmet
- Eddie Cibrian as Sean
- Dave Foley as Bob

=== Special guest stars ===
- Regis Philbin as Pierre
- Heather Locklear as Chloe
- Pat Harrington Jr. as Mr. Sherden
- Fred Willard as Doctor Hill
- Juliet Mills as Philipa Scroggs
- Ed Begley Jr. as Yogi
- Carter Oosterhouse as himself
- William Shatner as Sally
- Shirley Jones as Sophie
- Carol Burnett as Penny Chase
- Jean Smart as Bess Chase
- Tim Conway as Nick
- Tom Arnold as Danny
- Jack Wagner as Dr. Aaron Everett
- Kirstie Alley as herself
- Mary Tyler Moore as Diane
- Valerie Harper as Angie
- Cloris Leachman as Peg
- George Hamilton as Robin
- Jesse Tyler Ferguson as Wes
- Craig Ferguson as Simon

=== Guest stars ===
- Lauren Lapkus as Oscar
- Kelly Schumann as Sally
- Alan Ruck as Reverend Lare
- Nic Bishop as Liam
- Heather Dubrow as Nikki
- Marshall Manesh as Ye'arj
- Robbie Amell as Lloyd
- Cameron Mathison as Bill
- Kevin Farley as Ranger Murphy
- Danny Pudi as Tommy
- Brian Baumgartner as Claude
- John Colella as Rusty
- Jill Benjamin as Brenda
- Sam Daly as Milo
- Carole Gutierrez as Dr. Hernandez
- Samantha Martin as Jenna
- Jim Meskimen as Professor Zucker
- Michael Urie as Jeffrey
- Alice Amter as Dr. Kapoor
- Pej Vahdat as Ravi
- Parvesh Cheena as Manu
- Chris Williams as Dr. Greenly
- Yeardley Smith as Margaret
- Enrico Colantoni as Julian
- Brody Hutzler as Andy
- Edward Kerr as Rex
- Echo Kellum as Johnny
- Nick Searcy as Warden Burkhalter

== Production ==
Hot in Cleveland was renewed for a 24-episode fourth season on January 12, 2012. The summer premiere on June 19, 2013 aired live at 10:00 PM EDT/9:00 PM CDT (live-to-tape in the Mountain and Pacific time zones).

Heather Locklear, Jay Harrington, and Alan Dale all had recurring roles in season four. Locklear joined in the role of Chloe Summerlin, a former Miss Ohio who hires Melanie to work at her PR firm. Harrington plays as Alec, Summerlin's ex-husband who also works at the PR firm, and Dale plays Emmett Lawson, Victoria's movie co-star and love interest. Regis Philbin, Georgia Engel, and Michael McMillian also reprise their roles in season four. Engel is reunited with Fred Willard, her former TV husband on Everybody Loves Raymond, in the season's fifth episode. Eddie Cibrian guest stars in season four as a fireman and Joy's love interest. Juliet Mills reprises her season 1 role as Joy's hyper-critical mother, Philipa.

Danny Pudi, William Shatner, Brian Baumgartner, and Shirley Jones all have roles in the special live episode ("It's Alive") that kicks off the second half of the season. Carol Burnett and Tim Conway guest star this season, with Conway returning as Elka's ex-boyfriend Nick, and Burnett playing Penny, Victoria's mother. Jean Smart appears on the same episode as Burnett, as Victoria's sister, Bess. Mary Tyler Moore, Valerie Harper, and Cloris Leachman appear in an episode about Elka and Mamie reuniting with members of their 1963 championship bowling team. The three actresses reunite with White and Engel, with whom they all starred on The Mary Tyler Moore Show. Moore plays a different character than the one she portrayed in the season 2 premiere episode. The same episode features Jesse Tyler Ferguson as a famous avant-garde film director. Craig Ferguson appears in the season finale as Owen's father, who ran out on a 15-year-old Joy after getting her pregnant.

== Release ==
Season four was released in Region 1 on December 3, 2013. The DVD includes all 24 episodes on 3 discs.

== Episodes ==
No. overall	No. in season	Title	Directed by	Written by	Original release date	Prod. code	U.S. viewers (millions)
57	1	"That Changes Everything"	David Trainer	Rachel Sweet	November 28, 2012	401	1.70
The baby left on the girls' doorstep turns out to belong to Joy's son, Owen, and is the product of a one-night stand he had. While Owen debates giving up Joy's new grandson for adoption, the girls offer to help him raise the child if he will move to Cleveland permanently. Elka is frustrated with Pierre's slowness in making moves on her, so she tries to make him jealous by hitting on his brother, Etienne. Melanie gets a new job in a PR firm, which lands her in a love triangle between her boss Chloe (Heather Locklear) and her boss's ex-husband Alec (Jay Harrington). Victoria gets a part in a Woody Allen movie, but is frustrated by receiving her script lines one at a time.
58	2	"A Midwinter Night's Sex Comedy"	David Trainer	Steve Joe	December 5, 2012	402	1.44
With Chloe revealing she wants to get back together with her ex, Alec, Melanie is placed in an awkward position when she gets signals that Alec may be interested in her. Victoria's elation over her new movie role is tempered when the director wants her to gain weight for the role. Joy goes back to college, but feels she doesn't fit in. After Elka shows up in Joy's economics class, Joy discovers a big secret that Elka has been hiding.
59	3	"Method Man"	David Trainer	Sebastian Jones	December 12, 2012	403	1.20
Joy's struggles to fit in at college are amplified when Elka seamlessly blends in with a young, hip group. Victoria suspects her co-star in the Woody Allen movie, Emmett Lawson (Alan Dale), has ulterior motives, and she schemes to get to the bottom of it. Elsewhere, dishonesty gets Melanie into another sticky situation with Alec.
60	4	"GILFs"	David Trainer	Sam Johnson & Chris Marcil	December 19, 2012	404	1.21
After Elka and Mamie trick Joy into recording an online promo for their "GILFs" dating service, Joy starts getting hit on by numerous senior citizens. Victoria's fake, publicity-stunt relationship with her co-star starts to become very real. Meanwhile, Melanie can't stop texting Alec, even though she knows he is vacationing with his girlfriend, Carmen (Morgan Hewitt).
61	5	"A Box Full of Puppies"	Dennis Capps	Suzanne Martin	December 26, 2012	405	1.34
Victoria's journalist daughter, Oscar (Lauren Lapkus), comes to town to interview the ladies about "second chances" and the changes each has made since relocating to Cleveland, but Oscar sees no change in her mother. After the ladies' dog Chance eats Joy's keys, the girls all visit the local animal clinic. Joy is smitten by a handsome firefighter named Sean (Eddie Cibrian) who has just rescued four puppies from a burning building. Meanwhile, after receiving flirting lessons from Elka, Mamie meets the clinic's veterinarian, Dr. Hill (Fred Willard), who happens to be a childhood friend.
62	6	"Cleveland Fantasy-Con"	Joe Regalbuto	Chuck Ranberg & Anne Flett-Giordano	January 2, 2013	406	1.15
Joy gets an unexpected invitation to a Fantasy-Con event in town, while also learning that her fantasy date, Fireman Sean, is a Trekkie and a "brony", a fact she wishes to keep hidden. Alec returns to the office, and Melanie's love triangle with him and Chloe gets further complicated. Elka and Mamie run afoul of the law. Victoria becomes insecure in her relationship with Emmett, after he is spotted by photographers in Italy while out on the town with other female celebrities.
63	7	"Magic Diet Candy"	Joe Regalbuto	Sebastian Jones	January 9, 2013	407	1.33
Reverend Lare (Alan Ruck) mediates Joy's disjointed family, including Owen and her mother, Philipa (Juliet Mills), who are brought together for the first time at Wilbur's christening. Meanwhile, Elka alters the church's fresco and Melanie is starting to become annoyed with Victoria constantly obsessing over Emmett.
64	8	"Extras"	Andy Cadiff	Suzanne Martin	January 16, 2013	408	1.07
Joy is invited by Victoria to be an extra for a scene in the Woody Allen movie. When Victoria and Emmett become rude and dismissive to Joy and a male extra, Liam (Nicholas Bishop), Victoria explains that as a big star, that's what's expected of her. It turns out Liam has a past grudge against Emmett, and schemes with Joy to get back at him. After giving a "fake porn" performance during her first sexual encounter with Alec, Melanie worries she may have set the bar too high. Meanwhile, Wilbur utters his first few words while in the presence of Elka and Mamie, and they aren't words that Joy will be happy to hear.
65	9	"The Conversation"	Andy Cadiff	Steve Joe	January 23, 2013	409	1.33
When Emmett's ex-wife Nikki (Heather Paige Kent) arrives in town to ask a favor of him, she drops a bombshell that makes Victoria question Emmett's long-term commitment. Joy falls for her young doctor/biology tutor (Robbie Amell), until she learns just how young he really is. Meanwhile, a lonely mailman (Marshall Manesh) spends the entire weekend in the girls' home.
66	10	"The Anger Games"	Andy Cadiff	Sam Johnson & Chris Marcil	January 30, 2013	410	1.40
The girls' monthly game night turns vicious, as secrets are let out into the open. Meanwhile, Melanie sets up Joy on a date with Alec's friend, Bill (Cameron Mathison), and Elka is intoxicated with power while acting as Victoria's agent.
67	11	"Fast and Furious"	Andy Cadiff	Alex Herschlag	February 6, 2013	411	1.29
The girls all attend a spa retreat for mediation and a little weight loss, but the yogi (Ed Begley, Jr.) mixes up their itinerary. Joy calls on her newly learned sleuthing skills when it appears the yogi is acting suspiciously. The girls' juice-only diet has Melanie hallucinating. While Victoria learns than neither Joy nor Melanie would list her as an emergency contact, she still discovers how much each values her as a friend. Mamie accuses Elka of being bossy, and declares she wants out of their shady business venture.
68	12	"What Now, My Love?"	David Trainer	Rachel Sweet	February 13, 2013	412	1.29
In the mid-season finale, Victoria's movie is wrapping, which has her wondering if her relationship with Emmett may be ending in the process. Melanie is disappointed when Alec returns a toothbrush she left at his place, which makes her question where their relationship is heading. Joy begins a college internship with Detective Bob (Dave Foley), and her first assignment has her getting to the root of Elka's big secret.
69	13	"It's Alive"	Andy Cadiff	Joe Keenan	June 19, 2013	413	1.69
The episode picks up where the previous one left off, where it is revealed that Elka and Mamie Sue are running an illegal pharmacy to provide lower-cost medicines for the elderly. But when an ex-spelling bee contestant, Tommy (Danny Pudi), goes to pick up his grandfather's medication and reveals that he used to sell pills illegally before the women moved in on his business, he proposes to buy their stockpile or he will burn their house down. The ladies plot to have Detective Bob's brother Claude (Brian Baumgartner) pretend to be a major mob boss named Salvatore ("Sally from Cincinnati") to scare Tommy off. But things go awry when the actual Sally (William Shatner) shows up. Note: Live episode.
70	14	"Canoga Falls"	Andy Cadiff	Sebastian Jones	June 26, 2013	421	1.34
When Victoria's sister Bess (Jean Smart) announces that their mother, Penny (Carol Burnett), is acting strangely and has started forgetting things, the girls all take a trip to Canoga Falls to visit. Victoria finds her mother has become a hoarder and talks only through her sock puppets. Her worries are compounded when Bess announces she has begun dating a childhood friend and the two plan to travel the county together in a motor home. Victoria decides the best thing for her mother is an assisted living facility back in Cleveland, but Penny has already revealed to Elka that she only pretended to be crazy so that Victoria would visit. Penny ultimately moves to Cleveland, where she is almost immediately hit on by Nick (Tim Conway), one of Elka's former boyfriends.
71	15	"The Proposal"	Andy Cadiff	Chuck Ranberg & Anne Flett-Giordano	July 10, 2013	414	1.12
Emmett shows the girls (minus Victoria) an engagement ring with an enormous diamond, and announces that he plans to propose to Victoria. With nine previous marriages between the two, he and the girls struggle to come up with an original way for him to propose. The eventual proposal, however, is full of surprises that no one could have planned. Meanwhile, Melanie goes out of her way to make Alec feel manly after he reveals some very feminine traits.
72	16	"Pony Up"	Andy Cadiff	Jessica Wood & Jameson Lyons	July 17, 2013	418	1.28
Joy reconnects with firefighter Sean while on the job for Bob, her private investigator boss. But Bob and Sean become too close as friends, ruining Joy's romantic notions. Victoria, trying to get over Emmett's arrest, is asked to be a spokesperson for kidney donation registry. Struggling between her vanity and fame and her urge to be charitable, she unwittingly volunteers to give a kidney.
73	17	"No Glove, No Love"	Andy Cadiff	Alex Herschlag	July 24, 2013	417	1.12
Victoria and Joy struggle to build Wilbur's present for his first birthday. The toys move Alec into asking Melanie about having kids. Melanie and Alec entertain several dreams on how they'd be as parents; Alec falls in love with the idea while Melanie becomes more and more convinced she will be too old to mother another child. They agree to shelve the idea, but in the end, Melanie decides to break it off with Alec so that he can have the chance to experience parenthood.
74	18	"The Fixer"	Andy Cadiff	Chuck Ranberg & Anne Flett-Giordano	July 31, 2013	415	1.28
While lamenting that she has been unable to cry following her breakup with Alec, Melanie drinks a lot of wine and finally breaks down and cries in front of a bar patron (Tom Arnold). The two end up in Melanie's bed, with Melanie having no recollection of the previous night. Making the situation more awkward, the man turns out to be attorney Danny Doyle, a "fixer" in town to meet Victoria and help her bribe a judge to get Emmett out of jail. Doyle proposes that Victoria "pay" him by arranging a real date with Melanie, but by this time Melanie has already made a date with her gynecologist, Aaron (Jack Wagner). Meanwhile, Joy and Elka compete to make the best short film for a college class.
75	19	"Look Who's Hot Now"	N/A	N/A	August 7, 2013	422	1.31
The girls reflect on moments from season 4 through highlights and outtakes, and preview the final five episodes of the season.
76	20	"Cleveland Indians"	Andy Cadiff	Joe Keenan	August 14, 2013	416	1.20
In order to get Wilbur an appointment with a highly recommended pediatrician, Dr. Kapoor (Alice Amter), Joy comes up with multiple lies: she's part Indian, is a gourmet chef, and is Wilbur's 40-year-old mother. Things get more complicated when Dr. Kapoor sets up Joy on a dinner date with her son, Ravi (Pej Vahdat), and it turns out Joy isn't the only one with secrets. Meanwhile, Victoria hires wedding planner Jeff (Michael Urie) to set up a dream wedding inside Emmett's correctional facility, and Elka auditions for a play.
77	21	"Corpse Bride"	Andy Cadiff	Lisa Slopey	August 21, 2013	419	1.28
Melanie goes to her new boyfriend's apartment to break up with him, and finds him dead (the result of a heart condition). She also finds an engagement ring he was planning to give her and tries it on. When the boyfriend's cousin arrives and sees the ring, she assumes Melanie and her cousin had gotten engaged, and asks Melanie to host a wake AND deliver a eulogy. Meanwhile, Joy is having a hard time dealing with learning that her father (whom she barely knew) has died, and Victoria has a new "ab shocker" belt to pitch for the same Japanese company that makes the adult underpants she hawks on TV.
78	22	"All My Exes"	Andy Cadiff	Sam Johnson & Chris Marcil	August 28, 2013	420	1.22
After an accident at home, Victoria is laid up in the hospital. She uses the time to contact all her ex-husbands and find out what she did wrong in those marriages before she weds Emmett. She even contacts the one ex who broke her heart, a renowned heart surgeon named Julian (Enrico Colantoni), who happens to be in town and gives her the honest feedback she is looking for. Meanwhile, Elka and Mamie Sue check into the hospital to get the "Vegas treatment", while Melanie and Joy argue over which of the two a comatose patient would prefer.
79	23	"Love Is All Around"	Andy Cadiff	Steve Joe	September 4, 2013	423	1.75
In a recurrence of the girls finding dates for each other for their annual birthday celebration, Victoria meets a famous independent film director (Jesse Tyler Ferguson) with a strange physical trait, Joy is set up with one of her college professors (George Hamilton) who is more interested in Elka, while Melanie "hits the jackpot" by dating a plastic surgeon (Edward Kerr). Elka and Mamie Sue decide to get their 1963 championship bowling team back together for a 50th anniversary dinner, as their remaining three teammates (Mary Tyler Moore, Valerie Harper and Cloris Leachman) all return to Cleveland. Note: This episode is a reunion of several stars from The Mary Tyler Moore Show. The episode title is a nod to the TV show's theme song. At the end of the final scene, the camera pans to a kitten sitting in a window, which meows. This is a homage to the MTM Enterprises logo.
80	24	"The Man That Got Away"	Andy Cadiff	Rachel Sweet	September 4, 2013	424	1.90
Victoria's wedding day has arrived, but she finds the new warden in Emmett's correctional facility will only allow a prison cell ceremony with an official and three guests and no press. Victoria, who sold the exclusive rights to UK People Magazine, manages to convince one of their staff members to get ordained for the wedding and take photos from a hidden camera, but the wedding official (Craig Ferguson) turns out to be Simon, the father of Joy's child, and Elka helps the two reunite. Victoria and Emmett have their "honeymoon" in a conjugal trailer at the prison, where Emmett reveals that more charges have been brought against him and that he may be incarcerated up to 10 more years. At the end of the episode, Victoria returns to announce that Emmett has escaped prison, while Melanie announces she's pregnant.
