= Hot in Cleveland season 6 =

Hot in Cleveland
- Season 6
- No. of episodes: 24

Release
- Original network: TV Land
- Original release: November 5, 2014 – June 3, 2015

Season chronology
- ← Previous; Season 5

The sixth and final season of the TV Land original sitcom Hot in Cleveland premiered on November 5, 2014, and consisted of 24 episodes. The series stars Valerie Bertinelli, Wendie Malick, Jane Leeves, and Betty White.

On November 17, 2014, TV Land announced that this season would be the final season of Hot in Cleveland. The series concluded June 3, 2015, after six seasons and 128 episodes. The two-part series finale ("Vegas Baby"; "I Hate Goodbyes") aired as an hour-long episode.

== Cast ==
=== Main ===
- Valerie Bertinelli as Melanie Moretti
- Jane Leeves as Rejoyla "Joy" Scroggs
- Wendie Malick as Victoria Chase
- Betty White as Elka Ostrovsky

=== Recurring ===
- Georgia Engel as Mamie Sue Johnson
- Dave Foley as Bob
- Craig Ferguson as Simon
- Rhys Darby as Jack
- Michael McMillian as Owen
- William Baldwin as Dane

=== Special guest stars ===
- Mario Lopez as himself
- Robert Wagner as Jim
- Ben Vereen as Mayor Deacon
- Ernie Hudson as himself
- Stacy Keach as Alex Chase
- Missi Pyle as Canadian Joy
- Mackenzie Phillips as Kaylin
- Gladys Knight as Miss Shonda
- Garry Marshall as Ari
- George Takei as Reverend Matsuda
- Marla Gibbs as Marcia
- Carol Burnett as Penny Chase
- Chris Colfer as Tony Chase
- Juliet Mills as Philipa Scroggs
- Huey Lewis as Johnny Revere
- Thomas Gibson as Tom
- Bob Newhart as Bob Sr.

=== Guest stars ===
- Tom Parker as Peter
- Timm Sharp as Zed
- Andrew J. West as Cooper
- Will Sasso as Frankie
- Bryce Johnson as Dylan
- Millicent Martin as Agnes
- Bayne Gibby as Mona
- Lesley Nicol as Margaret
- Kelly Schumann as Sally
- Samantha Martin as Jenna
- Adam Korson as Barney
- Sophie Winkleman as Jill Scroggs
- Adam Croasdell as Earl of Cleveland
- Sunkrish Bala as Anderson
- Adam Korson as Barney
- Artemis Pebdani as Miss O'Roarke
- Brian Baumgartner as Claude
- Nick Searcy as Chief Barker
- Amber Valletta as Ashley
- Timothy Omundson as Mark
- Andy Milder as Dr. Laird
- Ray Abruzzo as Phil
- Matt Walsh as Arnie
- Kurt Fuller as Gerald
- Kelen Coleman as Andie
- Yvette Nicole Brown as Lily
- Jenny O'Hara as Helen
- Dennis Haskins as Reverend Bower
- Jim O'Heir as Ross
- Marla Sokoloff as Chloe
- Tate Ellington as Kameron
- Todd Grinnell as Nicky
- Tyler Ritter as Bart
- Darlene Hunt as Phyllis

== Production ==
On May 1, 2014, TV Land renewed Hot in Cleveland for a sixth season. Taping for season six began on September 19, 2014, and concluded on April 2, 2015. On November 17, 2014, TV Land announced that season six would be the final season. Guest stars for this season include: Ernie Hudson as one of Victoria's ex-husbands who helps her come to terms with their once embarrassing legacy, Andrew J. West as a young man that hits on Melanie, Timm Sharp as the producer of Victoria's new TV show, and Robert Wagner as Jim, a new man in Elka's life. Mario Lopez also made an appearance as himself. Sophie Winkleman guest stars as Joy's sister, Jill. Returning guest stars for the sixth season include Georgia Engel, Craig Ferguson, Dave Foley, Michael McMillian, Will Sasso, Brian Baumgartner, Chris Colfer and Carol Burnett. Rhys Darby also recurred this season as Jack, a new neighbor and Melanie's brief love interest. Billy Baldwin appears in a story arc as Dane Stevens, a reporter who becomes attracted to Melanie. Stacy Keach plays Victoria's father Alex in two episodes. Missi Pyle also appears in two episodes as "Canadian Joy", Bob's lover from his home country whom he almost marries. Ben Vereen appears as the Mayor of Cleveland. Kelen Coleman portrays Andi, Owen's bride-to-be, while George Takei makes an appearance as the priest for their ceremony. Bob Newhart and Thomas Gibson guest-starred in the series finale, while Huey Lewis reprised his role as Johnny Revere in this same episode.

== Release ==
Season six was released in Region 1 on April 26, 2016. The DVD includes all 24 episodes on 3 discs.

== Episodes ==
No. overall	No. in season	Title	Directed by	Written by	Original release date	Prod. code	U.S. viewers (millions)
105	1	"Comfort and Joy"	John Whitesell	Rachel Sweet	November 5, 2014	601	0.66
Joy announces to the girls that she wants to marry Simon, but not before she first informs Mitch and Detective Bob. Mitch finds out immediately, as he had bugged the house, while Melanie takes the task of telling Bob, only to end up sleeping with him after. Joy tells Simon "yes" and he is thrilled, but the moment is spoiled when Simon introduces his current 23-year-old wife to Joy. Simon explains he had to marry the woman to get her out of a dangerous situation in her home country, but vows to divorce her as soon as it is safe. When circumstances call for Simon to leave the country again, Joy realizes they shouldn't be together. Bob tries to swoop in and propose to Joy, but she says she is not looking to marry anyone at the moment. Nonetheless, Bob says he will keep trying, announcing that he's bought back the detective agency from Mitch. Elsewhere, Victoria enlists Susan Lucci's help in getting back an HBO series role that Helen Mirren had stolen, only to be double-crossed by Lucci.
106	2	"Fear and Loathing in Los Angeles"	John Whitesell	Michael A. Ross	November 12, 2014	602	0.77
Victoria has to travel to L.A. to meet Zed (Timm Sharp), the quirky director of her new HBO series, and the girls all tag along. After meeting Victoria, Zed reconsiders and cuts her from the role, thinking she is not sexy enough for the Malibu setting. Meanwhile, Joy tries to convince a well-known L.A.-area Private Eye that she can still be "honey bait" but she fails, while Melanie is hit on by a much younger man, only to discover he needs a photo with a HOG (Hot Older Gal) for a scavenger hunt. Elka fails to convince Mario Lopez to relocate his TV show to Cleveland as part of her "Film Cleveland" incentive, but she does convince Zed to shoot the HBO series there. While re-visualizing the series with a Cleveland backdrop, Zed decides that Victoria is now perfect for the lead.
107	3	"Bossy Cups"	Andy Cadiff	Lisa Slopey	November 19, 2014	603	0.72
Melanie gets to know her "He Said/She Said" co-host, Frankie (Will Sasso), a little better while he helps her install shelves in a bedroom closet. Victoria looks to parlay her recent fame into a successful internet project and enlists Joy to be a part of it, but the producer has other ideas and brings in a British actress to play Joy's part. Elka hits on a handsome senior named Jim (Robert Wagner), but finds that his beneath-the-surface qualities aren't very exciting.
108	4	"Naked and Afraid"	John Whitesell	Sebastian Jones	November 26, 2014	604	0.79
Melanie worries that Jack (Rhys Darby), a new neighbor, saw her dancing naked through a bedroom window. Jack instead sees Joy having sex with an acquaintance, and signals get crossed later when he tells Melanie that he wasn't thrilled with what he saw. Meanwhile, Elka is trying to sway a city councilman to vote for her as council president, so she sets up a party at the home and forces the girls to host.
109	5	"Tazed and Confused"	Andy Cadiff	Jessica Wood	December 3, 2014	605	0.71
Joy and Bob are staking out a site to catch a cheating husband, and Joy announces this will be her last case for the agency, given the awkwardness following Bob's marriage proposal. Victoria rides along, trying to learn more about the detective business for her HBO series and possibly pick up a signature character quirk. In the end, Joy and Bob stumble upon a much bigger crime-in-progress, and Joy realizes the two make a great team. Elsewhere, Mamie Sue has to back out of a "Secret Word" competition at the bar (similar to Password), leaving Elka no choice but to recruit Melanie as her partner.
110	6	"Out of Our Minds"	Peter Filsinger	Laura Solon	December 10, 2014	606	0.92
The girls all see visions of each other while facing up to their predictable traits. Joy decides to finally change her looks and colors her hair platinum-blonde, which ruins a date that Owen has with an albino woman. Melanie worries about having sex with Jack after the girls joke that the sex will probably be "basic vanilla". Elka worries about dating the mayor (Ben Vereen), knowing that as council president she is supposed to be his adversary.
111	7	"Cold in Cleveland: The Christmas Episode"	Andy Cadiff	Laura Solon	December 17, 2014	607	0.74
Victoria tries to buy the rights to Disco Christmas, an embarrassing movie from her past, after learning that many people (including Elka) hold annual viewing parties to laugh at it. The only problem is the rights belong to one of her ex-husbands (Ernie Hudson), who co-starred in the movie and who has no issues with it being aired every year. Meanwhile, Melanie duels the next-door neighbor in a Christmas lighting contest. Actress Lesley Nicol (Mrs. Patmore of Downton Abbey fame) guest stars.
112	8	"The Young and the Restless"	Andy Cadiff	Cheryl Holliday	January 7, 2015	608	0.77
Melanie's daughter Jenna comes to town with news that she has decided against going to Harvard medical school, which had always been her dream. When Jenna won't take mom's advice to reconsider, Melanie asks Joy to step in, but that backfires. Victoria is worried about how she looks in a nude love scene in her HBO show, so she visits the show's film editor only to find out the young man is infatuated with her. Meanwhile, Elka is entertaining a 12-year-old "councilman for a day" contest winner, and decides to take advantage and use the boy to fire a city employee.
113	9	"Bad Boys"	Andy Cadiff	Cheryl Holliday	January 14, 2015	609	0.84
Victoria's father Alex (Stacy Keach), also an actor, comes to town with news that he has three months to live. He tells his daughter that his dying wish is to play one more role on the screen, so Victoria manages to get him a part on her HBO series. Joy then overhears a phone conversation and finds out that Victoria's dad is clearly NOT dying, and he just lied to get work. Meanwhile, Melanie decides that Jack is far too clingy and wants to break up. She gets some advice from her co-worker Franky on how to handle the breakup, but it backfires.
114	10	"We Could Be Royals"	Andy Cadiff	Sam Johnson & Chris Marcil	January 21, 2015	610	0.95
Elka and Mamie Sue prepare for the arrival of the British Earl of Cleveland, who is coming to town. Joy's younger sister Jill (Sophie Winkleman), who recently left a convent, also arrives for a visit. The two vie for the attention of the Earl, but a series of accidents puts Joy at a disadvantage. Meanwhile, Victoria asks Melanie to help her meet a deadline on a children's book, not telling her that she received an advance on the book two years ago. Stumped for ideas, the two base the story on the competition between Joy and Jill.
115	11	"About a Joy"	Peter Filsinger	Suzanne Martin	January 28, 2015	611	0.92
Wilbur is being bullied at school in view of Joy and Bob, and the two disagree on how to handle it. When Bob shows up the next day and resolves the issue peacefully, Joy sees him in a new light and thinks he may really be the one for her. Unfortunately, "Canadian Joy" (Missi Pyle) has just come back into Bob's life. Meanwhile, Victoria tries to keep up with her much younger editor/boyfriend, while Melanie decides to confront her former school bully (Mackenzie Phillips) online.
116	12	"One Wedding and One Funeral"	Andy Cadiff	Rachel Sweet	February 4, 2015	612	0.71
Canadian Joy announces she's pregnant, and has an ultrasound image to prove it, so she and Bob plan a quickie wedding. Victoria recognizes the ultrasound as the one that Brad Pitt and Angelina Jolie posted of their baby, so Joy does all she can to stop Bob from marrying Canadian Joy. Elka has one final sexual fling with the mayor before breaking up with him, only to have the mayor die in bed with her. As the sitting City Council President, Elka becomes mayor. Elsewhere, Victoria is convinced a paparazzi drone is following her, so she hires Bob's brother Claude (Brian Baumgartner) as her bodyguard to give the impression of not wanting the attention.
117	13	"Scandalous"	Phill Lewis	Lisa Slopey	March 18, 2015	613	0.86
When a police detective is assigned to clear up some of the questions surrounding the former mayor's death, new mayor Elka hires her own detectives (Bob and Joy) to act as "cleaners" and help her avoid a scandal. But there's one other loose end: a nosy reporter named Dane (Billy Baldwin) whom Melanie is assigned to distract. Meanwhile, Victoria sweats over a focus group broadcast in Cleveland for her new HBO series, which will determine if the series airs or not - and the woman badmouthing her is one of the mayor's mistresses. Newly-dating couple Joy and Bob can't seem to find the right moment for their first kiss.
118	14	"Family Affair"	Dennis Capps	Alex Herschlag	March 25, 2015	614	0.74
Melanie gets DNA from the girls' toothbrushes to surprise them with their genealogies and family histories. The results show that: Joy and Elka have a common ancestor from Poland as well as a distant relative who is a waitress in the area, Victoria is 1/32 Native American, and Melanie has a distant cousin working as a therapist in Cleveland. Victoria tries to gain publicity by joining an Ohio Native American group, only to find that they want to use her to protest Chief Wahoo, the Cleveland Indians mascot. Melanie makes an appointment with her therapist cousin (Timothy Omundson) and finds that he is adorable, making her want to find out just how close of a cousin he is.
119	15	"All Dolled Up"	Andy Cadiff	Jessica Wood	April 1, 2015	615	0.82
While Bob is away in Canada, he sends Joy a creepy doll that looks like him to keep her company. The girls then think the doll has voodoo powers when strange things start happening to Bob. Victoria learns that her part has been cut from the HBO series, and she reluctantly auditions for a local theater production. Meanwhile, Melanie gets closer to Dane.
120	16	"Bad Girlfriends"	Andy Cadiff	Michael A. Ross	April 8, 2015	616	0.77
The male lead in Victoria's play falls ill, and Dane mentions he has some acting experience. Dane fills in wonderfully, but Melanie is not pleased when she watches the dress rehearsal and sees how much chemistry Dane has with Victoria in the love scenes. Meanwhile, Joy brags that Bob is the first man with whom she can watch the movie Love Actually after Bob says he likes it. But when Bob butt-dials Joy from a therapy session, she hears him say that he really hates the film. Frustrated with their men, Melanie and Joy scheme to get back at them, but their plans backfire. Elsewhere, Elka loses a bet with the mayor of Cincinnati on the Cincinnati Bengals-Cleveland Browns football game, and has to wear a Bengals mascot outfit for a week.
121	17	"Duct Soup"	Andy Cadiff	Rachel Sweet	April 15, 2015	617	0.74
Owen wants Joy and all the ladies to help out with his coming wedding ceremony as he is about to marry Andi (Kelen Coleman), but almost everything goes wrong. Simon makes a surprise return, only to be locked in a closet by Bob. Melanie orders what turns out to be a "phallic" cake, and the replacement cake is not much better. Elka spray paints "murder" on the bride's gown, mistaking it for a white fur coat that Andi's mom was wearing. Victoria's new pet parrot eats the wedding ring, and she also tries to avoid the bride's father (Kurt Fuller) because they went to high school together and he knows her real age. At the rehearsal dinner, Bob formally proposes to Joy after she announced that she wants to marry him. George Takei guest stars as Reverend Matsuda.
122	18	"Cleveland Calendar Girls"	Andy Cadiff	Cheryl Holliday	April 22, 2015	618	0.70
While drunk, Elka and Mamie Sue decide to make a nude calendar with several other elderly women as a way to earn money for Elka's beloved animal shelter. But as the photo shoot approaches, Mamie Sue gets cold feet. The other ladies all have reasons for getting their pictures taken: Melanie wants a head shot to promote her radio show, Joy and Bob want their photos snapped for an engagement announcement, while Victoria tries to get the DMV to use her retouched publicity shot for her driver's license. At their photo shoot, Joy and Bob decide they want to adopt a child.
123	19	"Kitchen Nightmare"	Andy Cadiff	Sebastian Jones	April 29, 2015	619	0.66
Having been fired from her radio job, Melanie decides she wants to buy the restaurant that the girls frequently visit. Joy and Victoria invest as well, and Victoria hires an L.A.-area restaurateur that she knows is attracted to her in hopes of making the restaurant more upscale. Just about everything goes wrong on opening night, until the girls decide they shouldn't have tried to change something that was working just fine. Meanwhile, Elka is disappointed that the girls didn't get each other dates for their birthdays this year, as she was hoping to be set up with Pope Francis. Melanie chuckles that she sent Elka's request to the Vatican but isn't holding her breath when, to everyone's surprise, The Pope actually shows up.
124	20	"All About Elka"	Andy Cadiff	Laura Solon	May 6, 2015	620	0.70
Victoria announces she has been named director of a community theater in Cleveland, and is casting for the play Summer of the Locusts. Her son Tony tries out for the male lead, but his acting is horrible. However, when Victoria hears him sing she decides to remake the play as a musical. Meanwhile, Victoria's mother Penny (Carol Burnett) is cast as the grandmother character, but understudy Elka does all she can to make sure Penny misses opening night. Meanwhile, Joy and Melanie do not like how their rear ends look in the restaurant security cameras, so they use some Hollywood tricks to soften the focus. This proves to be a bad idea after the bar is robbed and the police cannot make out the perpetrator's face.
125	21	"Say Yes to the Mess"	Andy Cadiff	Steve Vitolo & Jessica Poter	May 20, 2015	621	0.66
Joy's mother Philippa (Juliet Mills) comes to town for the wedding. As Philippa is still raw from her breakup with Daniel, Joy asks Bob to be especially nice and charming. He perhaps does this too well, as Philippa later confides in Victoria that she's fallen in love with Bob. Meanwhile, Victoria's father Alex has been sleeping with Elka, who then tries in vain to get rid of him now that he's served his purpose. Melanie and Victoria both struggle with the fact that Joy will be moving out of the house after the wedding.
126	22	"Hot in Cleveland: Hot Damn!"	N/A	N/A	May 27, 2015	622	0.76
The actresses recap six seasons worth of episodes through highlights, bloopers and behind-the-scenes stories. Series producers Sean Hayes and Todd Milliner provide additional commentary.
127	23	"Vegas Baby"	Andy Cadiff	Alex Herschlag, Sam Johnson, Chris Marcil & Suzanne Martin	June 3, 2015	623	1.02
128	24	"I Hate Goodbyes"	Andy Cadiff	Alex Herschlag, Sam Johnson, Chris Marcil & Suzanne Martin	June 3, 2015	624	1.02
Melanie is seated on a Paris-bound plane next to a handsome stranger, Tom (Thomas Gibson), and tells him the story of how she got to this point. The girls are all set to leave for Joy and Bob’s wedding in Paris, when Joy gets a call that a baby girl is available to adopt, but she and Bob have to go to Las Vegas right away to complete the process and pick up the baby. Before they depart, Bob’s father, Bob Sr. (Bob Newhart) shows up, saying he and Bob’s mother are now divorced and he is now ready to try dating again. Meanwhile, Victoria announces that she’s meeting an agent in Vegas, and will likely be moving back to California to reboot her acting career. In Vegas, Melanie, Mamie Sue, Elka and Bob Sr. all end up in jail, while Victoria has a chance encounter with old flame Johnny Revere (Huey Lewis). The two ponder why they are still chasing career dreams at their age. Joy and Bob find out that the adoption agency is highly religious, and they must be married before adopting the baby. They go to a quickie wedding chapel, only to find that Elka and Bob Sr. are already there to marry each other (having developed an attraction to one another), with everyone else as guests. As Elka/Bob Sr. and Joy/Bob get married in a double ceremony, Victoria and Johnny decide to get married in the near-future and have a more Hollywood-style wedding. The gang, now with baby Elizabeth, finally board a plane to Paris for the wedding reception. Melanie finishes her story just as the plane is shaken by a storm, and she grabs Tom’s hand. In a flash-forward to Elizabeth’s fifth birthday, Melanie and Tom are married, Bob Sr. and Elka (now 98) are still married, and Victoria and Johnny are now hitched. It is then revealed that the girls still get together every Wednesday night.
