= Love Is All Around (disambiguation) =

"Love Is All Around" is a song by The Troggs, later covered by Wet Wet Wet.

Love Is All Around may also refer to:

== Music ==
- Love Is All Around (album), a 1976 album by Eric Burdon and War, or the title track
- "Love Is All Around" (Adriana Evans song)
- "Love Is All Around" (Agnes Carlsson song)
- "Love Is All Around" (DJ BoBo song)
- "Love Is All Around" (Sonny Curtis song), the theme song to The Mary Tyler Moore Show

== Television ==
- Love Is All Around (TV series) (爱在你左右), a 2008 Malaysian Chinese drama series
- "Love Is All Around", the first episode of the TV series The Mary Tyler Moore Show
- Love Is All Around, an episode of Hot in Cleveland
- Love is All Around (2004 TV series) (사랑을 할꺼야), MBC weekend drama starring Jang Na-ra

== Videogame ==
- Love Is All Around (video game) (Simplified Chinese: 完蛋！我被美女包围了！), 2023 Chinese movie game
