= Talk to Me (American TV series) =

- Genre: Sitcom
- Created by: Suzanne Martin
- Starring: Kyra Sedgwick; Beverly D'Angelo; David Newsom; Nicole Sullivan; Peter Jacobson; Max Baker; Michael Estime
- Country of origin: United States
- Original language: English
- No. of seasons: 1
- No. of episodes: 5 (2 unaired)

Production
- Executive producers: Kyra Sedgwick; Suzan Bymel; Evelyn O'Neill; Suzanne Martin; Vic Kaplan
- Camera setup: Multi-camera
- Running time: 22 minutes
- Production companies: SamJen Productions; Touchstone Television

Original release
- Network: ABC
- Release: April 11 – April 25, 2000

Talk to Me is an American sitcom television series created by Suzanne Martin. The series stars Kyra Sedgwick, Beverly D'Angelo, David Newsom, Nicole Sullivan, Peter Jacobson, Max Baker and Michael Estime. The series aired on ABC from April 11 until April 25, 2000.

== Cast ==
- Kyra Sedgwick as Janey Munroe
- Beverly D'Angelo as Dr. Debra
- David Newsom as Rob
- Nicole Sullivan as Kat Munroe
- Peter Jacobson as Sandy
- Max Baker as Marshall
- Michael Estime as Cam

== Episodes ==
No.	Title	Directed by	Written by	Original release date	Prod. code
1	"About Taking It Like a Man"	Michael Lembeck	Suzanne Martin	April 11, 2000	002
2	"About Being Gay"	Andy Cadiff	Julie Nathanson	April 18, 2000	006
3	"About Makeovers"	Henry Winkler	Amy Toomin	April 25, 2000	004
4	"About Shopping"	Michael Lembeck	Sarit Catz	Unaired	003
5	"About Religion"	Andy Cadiff	Jeff Martin & Neal Boushell	Unaired	005
