= Love Is All Around (video game) =

2023 Chinese film-interactive video game

- Developers: WW: intiny; CN: Xiaoyouxingzhi
- Engine: Unity
- Release: WW: October 18, 2023; CN: August 2, 2024
- Genres: Romance, interactive movie
- Mode: Single-player

Love Is All Around (Note: Chinese: 完蛋！我被美女包围了！, lit. 'I am done for! I am surrounded by beauties!') is a film-interactive romance game developed by Chinese game studio intiny. The player assumes the role of Gu Yi (顾易), a failed art entrepreneur who navigates romantic relationships with six female protagonists he encounters, all portrayed by live-action actresses, while being poor and indebted.

The PC version of the game was launched on Steam and Epic Games Store on October 18, 2023, with console and mobile versions releasing August 2024 for PlayStation 4/5, Xbox One, Xbox Series X|S, Switch and mobile device platforms. A sequel game Love Is All Around 2 was released on Steam on July 16, 2025, featuring cast members of the original game but in a historical drama setting.

== Gameplay ==
The gameplay follows visual novel and dating sim conventions. Players watch live-action footage and make dialogue choices to advance the story, leading to different narrative branches and one of twelve possible endings. The protagonist Gu Yi, an entrepreneur deeply in debt with an unspecified appearance, interacts with various women with different personalities to develop intimate relationships. The game is reported to have more than 100 story branches and a dozen different endings.

== Characters ==
| Character | Actor | Description |
|---|---|---|
| Zheng Ziyan | Zhong Chenyao | Femme fatale, magazine editor (Chapter 1 debut) |
| Li Yunsi | Wang Ziyun (actress) | Older woman, art curator (Chapter 1 debut) |
| Xiao Lu | Zou Jiajia | Innocent girl, intern (Chapter 1 debut) |
| Shen Huixing | Yu Binghui | Spoiled rich heiress, Gu Yi's childhood friend (Chapter 3 debut) |
| Lin Leqing | Wang Xingchen | Single mom, accountant (Chapter 4 debut) |
| Zhong Zhen | Dong Qi | Cold beauty CEO, accounting firm partner (Chapter 5 debut) |
| Lao Liu | Zheng Xudong | Loyal best friend, real estate agent (Chapter 1 debut) |
| Xia Tian | Guo Xinyu | Athlete (DLC "Heartbeat in the Room" debut) |
| Chen Sai | Zhan Jiaming | Teacher (DLC "Heartbeat in the Room" debut) |
| Yan Jianing | Liu Dexi | STEM PhD (DLC "Heartbeat in the Room" debut) |

== Reception and impact ==
The game was popular on Steam, topping China's sales charts and reaching global top 10 upon release. Estimated sales range from 120,000 to 800,000 copies. Related hashtags on Bilibili and Douyin accumulated over 1.3 billion views. The six lead actresses also gained some notice from the game's release, with one doubling her Douyin followers to over 1 million within a week.

The game receives significant attention from the financial sector. Financial analysts praised the game's commercial success. Jiemian News summarized securities research reports attributing its popularity to relatable themes, live-action interactions, fulfilling player fantasies, accessible dating sim mechanics, and low development costs.

The game's success sparked investor interest in interactive movie games, causing related stocks to surge.

== Sequels ==
- Love Is All Around 2 launched in July 2025. The game was set in a fictional world with ancient Chinese style.

== See also ==
- Vanity Fair: The Pursuit
