= Vanessa McCarthy =

American television producer and writer

- Occupation(s): Television producer and writer
- Years active: 1999–present
- Awards: Robert Meltzer Award

Vanessa McCarthy is an American television producer and writer.

Her television writing credits include Friends, Abby, Modern Family and also producing and writing for Joey and Hot in Cleveland.

She was a head writer and executive producer for the sitcom Rules of Engagement.

== Awards ==
In 2004, she won The Robert Meltzer Writers Guild of America Award for her work on the animated sitcom Father of the Pride, as a part of the writing team.
