= Chuck Ranberg =

American playwright, producer and screenwriter

- Occupations: Playwright, producer, screenwriter

Chuck Ranberg is an American playwright, producer and screenwriter. He won five Primetime Emmy Awards in the categories Outstanding Comedy Series and Outstanding Writing for a Comedy Series for his work on the television program Frasier.

Ranberg produced and wrote for television programs including Kate & Allie, Becker, Desperate Housewives, The Game and Hot in Cleveland. In the 2000s, he wrote the Off-Broadway play End of the World Party, starring Jim J. Bullock and David Drake.

Ranberg is openly gay.
