= Sebastian Jones (television producer) =

American television producer and writer

Sebastian G. Jones
- Occupation(s): Television producer and writer
- Years active: 1992–present

Sebastian G. Jones is an American television producer and writer.

His credits include Friends, Spin City and Stark Raving Mad, working with fellow producer and writer Brian Buckner in the aforementioned series. Jones and Buckner then parted ways in 2005. As a solo writer, Jones worked on the series My Boys, Hot Properties, True Jackson, VP and Hot in Cleveland.

In 2002, Jones won a Primetime Emmy Award for his work on Friends as a part of the writing team. He was nominated again the following year.
