= Anne Flett-Giordano =

American television producer and screenwriter

Anne Flett-Giordano (née Flett; born 1965) is an American television producer and screenwriter, known for her work on Kate & Allie, Frasier, Desperate Housewives, Hot in Cleveland and Mom.

On Hot in Cleveland, the fictional medical condition "Flett-Giordano Syndrome" was named after her. She shared a 1997 Primetime Emmy Award for her work on Frasier.

She is also the author of the murder mystery / social satire Marry, Kiss, Kill.
