= Hot in Cleveland =

American television sitcom (2010–2015)

- Genre: Sitcom
- Created by: Suzanne Martin
- Showrunner: Suzanne Martin
- Starring: Valerie Bertinelli; Jane Leeves; Wendie Malick; Betty White
- Theme music composer: Ron Wasserman; Emerson Swinford
- Composers: Ron Wasserman; Emerson Swinford
- Country of origin: United States
- Original language: English
- No. of seasons: 6
- No. of episodes: 128 (list of episodes)

Production
- Executive producers: Suzanne Martin; Sean Hayes; Todd Milliner; Lynda Obst; Larry W. Jones; Keith Cox
- Producers: Bob Heath; Liz Feldman (season 1)
- Cinematography: Donald A. Morgan (Pilot); Gary Baum; Gary Palmer
- Editor: Ron Volk
- Camera setup: Multi-camera
- Running time: approx. 22 minutes (without commercials) approx. 46 minutes (hour-long final episode)
- Production companies: Hazy Mills Productions; SamJen Productions; TV Land Original Productions

Original release
- Network: TV Land
- Release: June 16, 2010 – June 3, 2015

Related
- The Soul Man (2012–16)

Hot in Cleveland is an American television sitcom aired on TV Land and starring Valerie Bertinelli, Jane Leeves, Wendie Malick, and Betty White.

The series, which was TV Land's first original series, premiered on June 16, 2010, and was TV Land's highest rated telecast in the cable network's 14-year history. The series was picked up for 10 episodes. On May 1, 2014, TV Land renewed Hot in Cleveland for a sixth season and confirmed the following November that it would be the show's last. The series ran for 128 episodes, with the hour-long final episode airing on June 3, 2015.

The series was created by Suzanne Martin and executive produced by Martin, Sean Hayes and Todd Milliner, through their production companies SamJen Productions and Hazy Mills Productions, and was produced in association with TV Land. The concept behind the show was based on an original idea by Lynda Obst, who serves as executive producer. The series was recorded in front of a live studio audience at CBS's Studio Center in Studio City, California.

== Synopsis ==
The series centers on three middle-aged best friends from Los Angeles: Melanie (Valerie Bertinelli), Joy (Jane Leeves), and Victoria (Wendie Malick). The three women find a more welcoming and less shallow, less youth-obsessed community in Cleveland, Ohio, after their Paris-bound plane makes an emergency landing. They decide to stay and lease a home where sassy elderly caretaker Elka (Betty White) resides in the guest house.

== Cast and characters ==
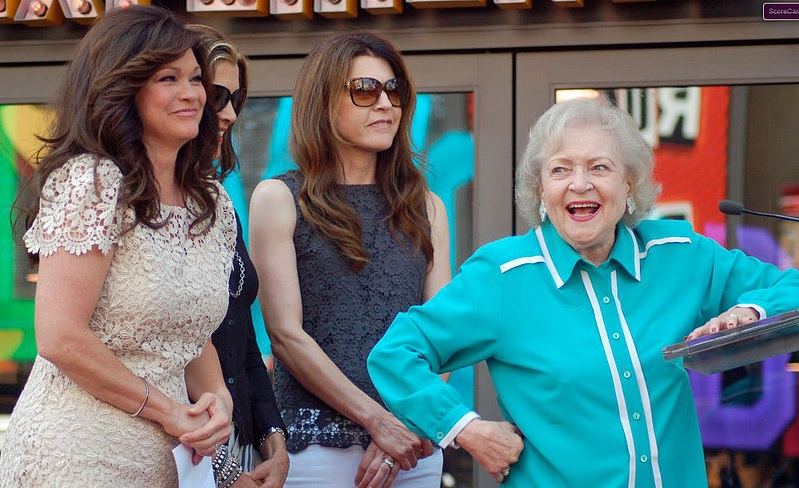
Valerie Bertinelli, Wendie Malick, Jane Leeves, and Betty White at the Hollywood Walk of Fame in August 2012

=== Main cast ===
- Valerie Bertinelli as Melanie Hope Moretti, a writer and mother of college-age son and daughter Will and Jenna. Depressed by her divorce, she boards a plane to Paris in the pilot episode with her best friends. However, when the plane makes an emergency landing in Cleveland, Melanie loves the city and its people so much that she decides to stay. In season 4, she finds work at a PR firm where she develops a relationship with her boss Alec. They briefly move in together, but break up so Alec can pursue a chance at fatherhood. Melanie discovers she is pregnant at the end of season 4 with Alec's baby; however, it turns out that she has a brain tumor, which caused symptoms that affected her pregnancy test. After getting the tumor removed, she is given her own talk show at a Cleveland radio station which she uses to give out advice to listeners.
- Jane Leeves as Rejoyla "Joy" Scroggs, an English beautician, known as the "Eyebrow Queen of Beverly Hills", who counts among her clients stars such as Oprah Winfrey and Ryan Seacrest. Joy has never married, and her mother, who still lives in England, is highly critical of her. Joy had a son, Owen, when she was 15, but put him up for adoption. In the first season finale, Joy receives a message from her son, but a tornado prevents her from contacting him. Owen finally comes to visit her in season 2, with disastrous results. At the end of season 3, a baby is left on the women's doorstep. This baby is revealed in season 4 as Joy's grandson Wilbur. At the end of season 4, Simon, Joy's ex-fiance and father of Owen, shows up and wants to get back together. Joy eventually marries her quirky boss, Bob, in the series finale and they adopt a baby girl they name Elizabeth or Betty for short.
- Wendie Malick as Victoria Chase, a five-time-divorced, Daytime Emmy Award-winning actress who is famous for playing the lead role of Honor St. Raven for 27 years in the long-running daytime soap opera, "Edge of Tomorrow". With the show recently canceled, Victoria laments that her only career opportunities are playing Megan Fox's grandmother and Melanie Griffith's mother (in separate projects), and promoting adult incontinence underwear in Japan. She has also appeared in numerous trashy Lifetime movies, the titles of which she brings up throughout the series. Her jobs in Cleveland have included high school drama teacher and reporter for Oh Hi, Ohio, a local news magazine program. At the end of season 2, she and Joy accidentally marry each other in Canada while they are drunk. In season 4, she stars in a fictional Woody Allen movie, which wins her an Oscar, and also marries her co-star Emmett Lawson while he is in prison. Also in season 4, someone reveals her real age, but it is censored onscreen. She has two daughters, Emmy (an actress) and Oscar (a journalist), and one son named Tony (a software developer whom she often forgets). She is sworn enemies with real-life soap star Susan Lucci, and their rivalry is depicted throughout the series.
- Betty White as Elka Ostrovsky, an elderly Polish caretaker whose judgmental retorts to the other women in the pilot reveal an astringent demeanor and allude to a storied life, including escaping from the Nazis, an active sex life, heavy drinking, and possible marijuana use. It is revealed in the first season finale that her late husband had mob connections, and that the smell of marijuana came from the polish of his stolen goods. In the season 2 finale her "dead" husband surprisingly shows up at her wedding to Fred. White was only expected to have a guest role in the pilot episode, but her performance was so well-received that the producers decided to make her a regular. Elka is 88 at the start of the series (White's real-life age in 2010). During season 3, she celebrates her 90th birthday, and she later remarks her age in several episodes. A running joke on the series is Elka's ability to attract men better than Joy does. Elka is elected to a Cleveland City Council seat in season 5. She becomes mayor in season 6, after the previous mayor died.

=== Recurring cast ===
- Wayne Knight as Rick (seasons 1–2), the women's neighbor and a reporter for the Cleveland Plain Dealer. Rick has slept with Joy, but professes in Season 2 that he is more attracted to Melanie.
- Carl Reiner as Maxwell Sidney "Max" Miller (seasons 1–3; 5), Elka's on-again/off-again (mostly off) boyfriend
- Susan Lucci (seasons 1–3; 5), as a fictionalized version of herself. A rival of Victoria's from their soap opera days, who is constantly competing with her. In season 6, she is revealed by Victoria's mother Penny to be Victoria's half-sister from an affair her father Alex had during their marriage.
- Huey Lewis as Johnny Revere (seasons 1–3, 6), a famous musician who has an on/off sexual relationship with Victoria that dates back many years. Though the two have genuine affection for each other, career pursuits always got in the way of a lasting relationship. In the series finale, the two finally decide to settle down, and they get engaged.
- Joe Jonas as Will Moretti (seasons 1; 3), Melanie's son, who is in college
- Juliet Mills as Philippa Scroggs (seasons 1; 4–6), Joy's uptight and critical mother
- Michael McMillian as Owen Berr (seasons 2–6), Joy's son from a teenage pregnancy, whom she gave up for adoption. He has his own son, Wilbur, in the fourth season.
- Jennifer Love Hewitt as Emmy Chase (seasons 2–3; 5), Victoria's actress daughter. In the fifth season, it is revealed she is married and eight months pregnant with a daughter, named Melon, to whom she gives birth in the same episode. She played a cop named Cole in the TV series Cole's Law.
- John Mahoney as Roy Miller (seasons 2–3; 5), a waiter who flirts with Elka in season two. In season three, he fakes a murder investigation to get closer to Elka. The two start dating, and go on many adventures, including skydiving. They break up after Roy's mother disapproves of Elka, but get back together in season 5, albeit briefly.
- Buck Henry as Fred (seasons 2–3), Elka's fiancé in season 2. Their wedding is halted before they say their vows after Elka's "dead" husband shockingly shows up.
- James Patrick Stuart as Colin Cooper (seasons 2–3), Victoria's co-anchor on Oh Hi, Ohio, whom she finds annoying. He has an off/on relationship with Joy throughout the second and third seasons.
- Jon Lovitz as Artie Firestone (seasons 2–3), a mentally unstable billionaire who is heir to the Firestone family fortune. In season two, while disowned by his family and homeless, he became engaged to Joy so she could get her green card. In season three, he began taking medication for his mental illness and was welcomed back into the Firestone family. The character's name and personal fortune is a reference to another character played by Lovitz, Artie Ziff, on The Simpsons.
- Georgia Engel as Mamie-Sue Johnson (seasons 3–6), a naïve friend of Elka's. She and Elka run an illegal pharmacy in the fourth season.
- Dave Foley as Bob (seasons 4–6). Joy's strange and sleazy employer at a private detective agency where she works as a college intern. He quickly becomes infatuated with Joy. By Season 6, Joy finally reciprocates the feelings and the two get engaged. They get married and adopt a baby girl named Betty in the series finale. (Actor Dave Foley first appeared in a season 1 episode in which he played Dr. Robert Moore, the head of a Cleveland medical foundation who checks on Victoria when she fakes a deadly disease in order to gain sympathy for her Emmy nomination.)
- Craig Ferguson as Simon (seasons 4–6), Joy's former lover, Owen's father, and Wilbur's grandfather, who comes back into her life unexpectedly
- Jay Harrington as Alec Jones (seasons 4–5), Melanie's boss and love interest in the fourth season. He and Melanie break up amicably, so that he can have the chance to be a father.
- Heather Locklear as Chloe Powell (season 4), Alec's ex-wife who is still his business partner
- Alan Dale as Emmett Lawson (season 4), Victoria's on-screen and off-screen love interest during the fourth season. He proposes to Victoria, but is soon arrested for tax fraud. He and Victoria marry in prison in the season finale, but he escapes from prison disguised as her. He faked his death and is presumably still alive in a remote area of the world, but Victoria decides to move on without him.
- Eddie Cibrian as Sean (season 4), Joy's fireman love interest
- Tim Daly as Mitch Turner (season 5), Joy's new boss after he takes over the detective agency from Bob. He later becomes Joy's boyfriend.
- Bill Bellamy as Councilman Jim Powell (season 5), a former Ohio State University football star who holds a city council seat that Elka seeks

=== Guest stars ===
==== Season 1 ====
Guest stars during the first season included Shirley Knight as Melanie's overprotective mother, Loretta; Hal Linden as Victoria's womanizing actor father, Alex; singer Joe Jonas as Melanie's son, Will; Carl Reiner as Max, Elka's boyfriend; Bil Dwyer as Melanie's ex-husband Anders; and Juliet Mills as Joy's critical mother, Philippa. Other first season guest stars include John Schneider, Wayne Knight, Robert Gant, Huey Lewis, Amy Yasbeck, Tim Conway, Mark Indelicato, David Starzyk, Gary Anthony Williams, Dave Foley and Susan Lucci.

==== Season 2 ====
For the second season, Mary Tyler Moore guest starred in the season premiere as Elka's jail cellmate, in the wake of the latter's arrest in the first season finale. This marked the first time since 1977, when The Mary Tyler Moore Show ended, that White and Moore had worked together. Sherri Shepherd appeared in two episodes as the judge in Elka's competency case. David Starzyk, John Schneider, Huey Lewis, Wayne Knight and Carl Reiner all reprised their roles from season 1. Bonnie Franklin also guest starred as Melanie's ex-boyfriend's mother, Franklin reuniting with One Day at a Time co-star Valerie Bertinelli. On July 20, 2011, Doris Roberts appeared as Lydia Dombrosky, Elka's nemesis. Jennifer Love Hewitt guest starred as Victoria's daughter Emmy, while Michael McMillian appeared as Joy's son, Owen. Buck Henry appeared in multiple episodes as Elka's love interest and eventual fiancé. Jimmy Kimmel, Susan Lucci, and Melanie Griffith made guest appearances as themselves. Michael E. Knight, Jon Lovitz, Isaiah Mustafa, Monica Horan, Max Greenfield, Mindy Cohn, Amy Sedaris, Frank Caliendo, Cedric the Entertainer, Darnell Williams and Jane Leeves' Frasier co-stars Peri Gilpin and John Mahoney also appeared on the show as guest stars. Don Rickles made a surprise appearance as Elka's dead husband in the Season 2 finale, "Elka's Wedding".

==== Season 3 ====
Season three features guest stars such as series producer Sean Hayes as a hand model boyfriend of Victoria's, Gilles Marini as Captain Lebeau, Kathie Lee Gifford, Sandra Bernhard, Don Rickles as Elka's late husband Bob, who faked his death, John Mahoney (Leeves' former Frasier costar) as Roy, Elka's boyfriend, and Laura San Giacomo as Melanie's estranged sister, and Baron Davis and Josh Cribbs as themselves. In addition to Mary Tyler Moore guest starring in the second season premiere, the third season saw Betty White reunite with Ed Asner and Georgia Engel in two separate episodes. The season includes the return of guests Jennifer Love Hewitt, Susan Lucci, Huey Lewis, Joe Jonas and Jon Lovitz. Cybill Shepherd, Curtis Armstrong, Andy Richter, Roger Bart, Paul Dooley, Jonathan Silverman, Doug Savant, Rhea Perlman, Kristin Chenoweth, Barry Bostwick, Alex Borstein, Dan Cortese, Lee Corso, Kevin Nealon, Regis Philbin, Joan Rivers, and David Spade—who had co-starred with Malick in Just Shoot Me, as had San Giacomo—also make guest appearances in the third season. Rick Springfield portrays an impersonator of himself who tricks Joy into sleeping with him in episode 16. Dan Dotson and Laura Dotson from Storage Wars appear as themselves in Episode 22.

==== Season 4 ====
Season four recurring guests include Heather Locklear as Chloe, Jay Harrington as Alec, and Alan Dale as Emmett. Other guest stars include Craig Ferguson, who plays the ex-boyfriend that left Joy when she became pregnant, Eddie Cibrian as Sean, Fred Willard as Dr. Hill, and Gary Anthony Sturgis as Officer Davenport, while Ed Begley Jr., Nicholas Bishop, Heather Dubrow, Dave Foley, Jesse Tyler Ferguson and George Hamilton also make guest appearances. Georgia Engel and Regis Philbin reprise their roles from the previous season, while Michael McMillian returns as Owen, Joy's son and Juliet Mills returns for one episode as Joy's mother. In the live episode for the mid-season premiere, Academy Award winner Shirley Jones makes a guest appearance, as does William Shatner as "Sally from Cincinnati". Carol Burnett guest-starred as Victoria's mother and Jean Smart guest-starred as Victoria's sister in the second episode of the summer season. Tim Conway also reprised his role as Elka's ex-boyfriend, Nick.

Pat Harrington Jr., Bertinelli's former One Day at a Time co-star, made a guest appearance as hotel clerk Mr. Sherden in "GILFs".

The Mary Tyler Moore Show cast reunited on screen for the first time in 36 years, in an episode where Mary Tyler Moore, Valerie Harper, Cloris Leachman, Betty White and Georgia Engel were all members of a 1960s bowling team reuniting for the first time in 50 years.

In the season finale, Melanie announces she is pregnant, Joy rekindles her love for her son's father, and Victoria's husband, Emmett, who is in jail, has escaped on the night of their jailhouse honeymoon.

==== Season 5 ====
Season 5 premiered with The Soul Man with two back-to-back live episodes on March 26, 2014 (10:00PM EDT and 10:30PM EDT). Guest stars in the premiere episode included Dave Foley and Georgia Engel reprising their roles from the previous seasons, as well as Ken Jeong and Albert Tsai making a guest appearances with Alex Trebek appearing as himself. Cedric the Entertainer made a special guest appearance reprising his role from the Hot in Cleveland spin-off The Soul Man, while Betty White reprised her role as Elka on The Soul Man. Jennifer Love Hewitt, Jay Harrington, Craig Ferguson, Michael McMillian, Susan Lucci and Juliet Mills reprised their roles from the previous seasons. Tim Daly was added as recurring character Mitch, Joy's new boss and love interest. Additional guest appearances were made by Thomas Lennon, Jaime Pressly, Angela Kinsey, Chris Elliott, Jason Priestley, Sarah Hyland, Max Greenfield, Cheri Oteri, Chevy Chase, Rob Schneider, Nora Dunn, Morgan Fairchild, Coby Bell, Chris Colfer, Will Sasso, Steven Tyler (in the special animated episode), Queen Latifah, Perez Hilton and Debra Monk.

==== Season 6 ====
The sixth season was announced by TV Land as the final season for the series. Guest stars for this season include: Ernie Hudson as one of Victoria's ex-husbands who helps her come to terms with their once embarrassing legacy, Lesley Nicol who appeared in the Christmas episode; Andrew J. West as a man who hits on Melanie, Timm Sharp as the producer of Victoria's new TV show, and Robert Wagner as Jim, a new man in Elka's life. Mario Lopez appears as himself, with newly appointed Councilwoman Elka trying to lure him into taping his TV show in Cleveland. Gladys Knight and Ben Vereen appear in the "One Wedding and One Funeral" episode. Will Sasso reprises his role as Franky, Melanie's co-host on the "He Said/She Said" radio program. Bob Newhart, Thomas Gibson and Huey Lewis all appear in the season and series finale. Stacy Keach plays Victoria's father Alex in two episodes. MacKenzie Phillips, Bertinelli's former co-star in One Day at a Time, would make an appearance as Melanie's former school bully Caylin, in "About a Joy".

== Episodes ==
Season	Episodes	Originally released		Viewers (in millions)
Season	Episodes	First released	Last released	Viewers (in millions)
1	10	June 16, 2010	August 18, 2010	3.12
2	22	January 19, 2011	August 31, 2011	2.09
3	24	November 30, 2011	June 6, 2012	1.52
4	24	November 28, 2012	September 4, 2013	1.34
5	24	March 26, 2014	September 10, 2014	—N/a
6	24	November 5, 2014	June 3, 2015	0.79

== Development and production ==
Hot in Cleveland was TV Land's first attempt at a first-run scripted comedy (the channel has rerun other sitcoms since its debut) and was produced by Sean Hayes's Hazy Mills Productions and written by Suzanne Martin, who also served as the showrunner. It was shot with a multicamera setup in front of a live studio audience at the CBS Studio Center production studios.

Martin initially got the idea from the period after Estelle Getty died, when clips of Getty's sitcom, The Golden Girls, were being replayed on the news. This caused Martin "to think about women in their 50s and what the show meant for women now." She then devised a scenario in which "women in that age group landed somewhere in America and they were 'hot again' there". Martin initially pitched the series to CBS, who rejected it, which Martin believes was "because it involved women older than the demo they were looking at". At the time of the pickup, Martin was unaware of TV Land's existence.

TV Land announced that the show had been renewed for a second season on July 7, 2010. The 20-episode second season began production on November 1, 2010, and premiered January 19, 2011. On February 28, 2011, TV Land renewed the show for a third season to consist of 22 episodes. On March 21, 2011, TV Land announced that the third season order had been increased to 24 episodes. On January 12, 2012, TV Land renewed the series for a fourth season.

Betty White was only meant to appear in the pilot of the show but was asked to stay on for the entire series.

=== Spin-off series and crossovers ===
On April 18, 2011, it was announced that Cedric the Entertainer would guest star in a season 2 episode as a minister who gets caught up in the girls' problems. The episode served as a backdoor pilot for a spin-off series to star Cedric. The episode entitled "Bridezelka" was written by Hot in Cleveland creator Suzanne Martin and aired on August 24, 2011.

The spin-off series centers on Reverend Boyce (Cedric) as he moves from Cleveland to St. Louis and has to balance his wild past as an R&B singer with the expectations of his congregation and his family. On January 12, 2012, TV Land officially picked up the pilot to series, under the title Have Faith; with the first season set to have 12 episodes. On March 11, 2012, it was announced that the series' title was changed from Have Faith to The Soul Man. The series premiered on June 20, 2012. In the March 27, 2014 premiere of Hot in Cleveland, Cedric the Entertainer reprises his role as Reverend Boyce; however, he doesn't appear to recognize the characters from his appearance in Season 2 of Hot in Cleveland. Betty White also reprises her role as Elka on The Soul Man.

In the second season of Hot in Cleveland, the show crossed over with daytime soap opera All My Children, in the two-part episode "I Love Lucci". Wendie Malick appeared on All My Children, where she was credited as Victoria Chase, while Susan Lucci appears as herself on Hot in Cleveland.

The fifth season of Hot in Cleveland featured a crossover with the television series Kirstie, which also aired on TV Land in 2013–14.

== Critical reception ==
The show received positive reviews from critics, with Wendie Malick getting praise for her performance. Furthermore, the first season scored a 73% based on 30 reviews and 66 out of 100 based on 28 reviews on Metacritic.

=== Comparisons with The Golden Girls ===
Hot in Cleveland has been referred to as a modern spin on the classic 1980s television series The Golden Girls, which also featured actress Betty White in a starring role. Craig Berman of Today stated that the show is "as close as we're likely to get to a repeat of White's 1980s ensemble comedy hit, The Golden Girls ... [TV Land] the network known as the refuge for people looking to fall asleep to reruns of shows from their childhood has made its first scripted program a modern version of the classic sitcom premise." Alessandra Stanley of The New York Times commented: "This is the first original scripted comedy on TV Land, a network that was founded on reruns. So not surprisingly, Hot in Cleveland is a pastiche of classics – a little bit Cheers and Frasier, a little bit The Golden Girls." Michael Musto of The Village Voice wrote: "Tart-tongued Wendie Malick is basically the modern-day Bea Arthur. Sweet-faced Valerie Bertinelli is the new Betty White. Been-around Jane Leeves is the nouveau Rue McClanahan. And witheringly sarcastic Golden Girl Betty White has turned into Estelle Getty."

Comparing average ages of the ensemble casts for the duration of each show, the Hot in Cleveland cast averaged 61.5 at the start to 66.5 at the end, while The Golden Girls cast averaged 59.75 at the start to 66.25 at the end. At 64 during the final season of Hot in Cleveland, Wendie Malick was a year older than the two oldest actors in the first season of The Golden Girls, Bea Arthur and Betty White who were 63 when that show began.

== Awards and nominations ==
Betty White received a Screen Actors Guild Award nomination for her role as Elka Ostrovsky, and went on to win the award. The cast received a nomination for Outstanding Performance by an Ensemble in a Comedy Series.

On May 17, 2011, TV Land entered the show in the race for the 63rd Primetime Emmy Awards. The show submitted for Outstanding Comedy Series and Outstanding Supporting Actress in a Comedy Series for all four leading women, to reinforce the idea of an ensemble cast. The show also submitted in technical categories.

On July 14, 2011, the show received two Primetime Emmy nominations, including Betty White getting nominated for Outstanding Supporting Actress In A Comedy Series.

In December 2011, Betty White received her second consecutive SAG nomination for Outstanding Performance by a Female Actor in a Comedy Series. She went on to win it.

Hot in Cleveland was also nominated for five other Emmys.

Awards	Year	Category	Nominee	Result
The Comedy Awards	2011	Best Actress in a TV Comedy	Betty White	Nominated
Emmy Awards	2011	Outstanding Supporting Actress in a Comedy Series	Betty White	Nominated
Emmy Awards	2011	Outstanding Art Direction for a Multi-Camera Series	Michael Andrew Hynes and Maralee Zediker (for "Sisterhood of the Traveling SPANX©", "I Love Lucci: Part Two", and "LeBron is Le Gone")	Won
Gracie Allen Awards	2011	Best Actress in a Comedy Series	Betty White	Won
Screen Actors Guild Awards	2011	Outstanding Performance by a Female Actor in a Comedy Series	Betty White	Won
Screen Actors Guild Awards	2011	Outstanding Performance by an Ensemble in a Comedy Series	Valerie Bertinelli, Jane Leeves, Wendie Malick and Betty White	Nominated
People's Choice Awards	2012	Favorite Cable TV Comedy	Hot in Cleveland	Won
Screen Actors Guild Awards	2012	Outstanding Performance by a Female Actor in a Comedy Series	Betty White	Won
GLAAD Media Awards	2012	Outstanding Individual Episode (in a series without a regular LGBT character)	Hot in Cleveland episode "Beards"	Won
People's Choice Awards	2013	Favorite Cable TV Comedy	Hot in Cleveland	Nominated
Screen Actors Guild Awards	2013	Outstanding Performance by a Female Actor in a Comedy Series	Betty White	Nominated
People's Choice Awards	2014	Favorite Cable TV Comedy	Hot in Cleveland	Nominated

== Ratings ==
The series premiere of Hot in Cleveland was a ratings success for TV Land. It earned a 1.9 rating, averaged 2 million viewers among the network's target audience of adults 25–54, and averaged 1.3 million among women 25–54. It drew a total of 4.75 million viewers, making it the most watched show in TV Land history.

Season	Timeslot (ET/PT)	# Ep.	Premiere date	Premiere viewers (millions)	18-49 rating	Finale date	Finale viewers (millions)	18-49 rating	TV season	Viewers (millions)	
1	Wednesday; 10:00 pm	10	June 16, 2010	4.75	1.5	August 18, 2010	3.40	0.9	2010	4.2	2.8
2	Wednesday; 10:00 pm	22	January 19, 2011	2.95	0.7	August 31, 2011	2.44	0.5	2011	2.08	2.8
3	Wednesday; 10:00 pm	24	November 30, 2011	1.94	0.4	June 6, 2012	1.95	0.5	2011–2012	1.52	2.8
4	Wednesday; 10:00 pm	24	November 28, 2012	1.70	0.4	September 4, 2013	1.90	0.5	2012–2013	1.34	2.8
5	Wednesday; 10:00 pm	24	March 26, 2014	1.35	0.3	September 10, 2014	0.91	0.2	2014	—N/a	
6	Wednesday; 10:00 pm	24	November 5, 2014	0.66	0.2	June 3, 2015	1.02	0.2	2014–2015	—N/a	

== Home media ==
Paramount Home Media Distribution has released all six seasons on DVD in Region 1.

DVD Name	Region 1 Release date	Region 2 Release date	Region 4 Release date	# Ep.	Discs	Special features
Season 1	January 11, 2011	April 25, 2011	February 17, 2011	10	2	Original full-length pilot, bloopers, wardrobe featurette, "We Love Our Age" featurette, set tour, Victoria's full-length Japanese "lady pants" commercial, episode of "Retired at 35"
Season 2	November 29, 2011 (USA); January 31, 2012 (Canada)	August 29, 2011 (Part 1); February 25, 2013 (Part 2); February 25, 2013 (Complete Season 2)	January 19, 2012	22	3	Interviews, The Cast Visits Cleveland, On the Set of Hot in Cleveland, The First Episode of TV Land's Newest Sitcom, The Exes
Season 3	November 27, 2012	—N/a	—N/a	24	3	
Season 4	December 3, 2013	—N/a	—N/a	24	3	Look Who's Hot Now clip episode
Season 5	November 4, 2014	—N/a	—N/a	24	3	
Season 6	April 26, 2016	—N/a	—N/a	24	3	
The Complete Series	July 27, 2021	—N/a	—N/a	128	—N/a	

== Broadcast ==
=== Syndication ===
On March 20, 2013, TV Land announced that Hot in Cleveland had been renewed for a 24-episode fifth season, to begin in late fall of 2013. With the fifth season bringing the total episodes in the series to 104, TV Land also announced it had made deals in 92% of the U.S. television markets for a syndication package, which premiered in the fall of 2014. The show also aired on the Nick Jr. Channel's short-lived NickMom block from May 23 to September 27, 2015, and on GetTV in 2019, but was pulled a couple years later. Starting September 1, 2025, it debuted on Catchy Comedy, currently airing weeknights at 9:00pm ET.

=== International ===
On June 22, 2010, it was announced that Endemol would distribute Hot in Cleveland internationally, while CBS Television Distribution would own the American rights, with syndication to start in 2013. The show began broadcasting on July 5, 2010, in Canada on CTV, and on July 9 on The Comedy Network. Only Season 1 and Part 1 of Season 2 have aired. It previously airs in strip on M3.

It began broadcasting on July 26, 2010, in Australia on the Nine Network. Since 2020, all six seasons have been available for streaming on 10 Play.

In the UK and Ireland, the series began airing on Sky Living on February 15, 2011. For season 3, the show switched to Sony Entertainment Television.

In South Africa, it began broadcasting on M-Net on July 8, 2011. In India, Hot in Cleveland started airing from June 2012 on Comedy Central.
