= Andy Cadiff =

American producer, TV director (born 1955)

- Born: May 27, 1955 (age 71); Newton, Massachusetts, U.S.
- Education: Harvard University
- Occupations: Producer, television director
- Years active: 1978–present
- Spouse: Susan Diol (m. 2003; div. 2010)

Andy Cadiff (born May 27, 1955) is an American producer and television director.

Born in Newton, Massachusetts, Cadiff attended the Belmont Hill School, where he graduated in 1973. He then attended Harvard University, and later moved to New York. Cadiff began his career in 1978, where he worked as an assistant stage manager for the Broadway play On The Twentieth Century. He then worked on the play Evita in 1979. Cadiff made his debut as director on the play Mail in 1988. In the same year, he was director for one episode of the sitcom television series Eisenhower and Lutz. Cadiff then made his producing debut in 1989 as producer for three episodes of the sitcom television series FM. His directing credits include Quantum Leap, Empty Nest, Growing Pains, Home Improvement, Spin City, The Hughleys, My Wife and Kids, According to Jim, The King of Queens, George Lopez, Hot in Cleveland and Last Man Standing.

In 1997 Cadiff directed the film Leave It to Beaver, followed by Chasing Liberty in 2004 and A Bunch of Amateurs in 2008.
