= Suzanne Martin =

American television producer and writer

- Born: Suzanne Moore
- Occupation(s): Television producer, writer
- Years active: 1994–present
- Spouse: Jeff Martin (m. 1986)
- Children: 2

Suzanne Moore Martin is an American television producer and writer. She is best known for creating Hot in Cleveland (2010–2015). Her writing and producing credits include Ellen, Frasier and The Soul Man. She also created the television series Maybe It's Me and Hot Properties and Crowded.

== Early life and career ==
Suzanne was raised in Cumberland, Rhode Island and graduated from Cumberland High School. Before pursuing a career in television, Martin was a vice president in the New York City office of Quinn, Brein & Block, a Los Angeles–based public relations concern, She later graduated from Barnard College. Her father, Robert R. Moore, was a claims supervisor for the American Mutual Insurance Company in Providence, Rhode Island, where her mother, Alice M. Moore, was the senior supervisor with the Rhode Island Department of Social Services.

Her first foray in television was writing for the television series The Good Life. She went on to win two Emmy Awards as a part of a writing ensemble for Frasier.

She is the creator of the award-winning show Hot in Cleveland. She serves as an executive producer and writer for the show.

== Personal life ==
She married television producer and writer Jeff Martin in 1986. They have two daughters.

== Television credits ==
Year	Title	Credited as		Notes
Year	Title	Writer	Executive Producer	Notes
1994	The Good Life	Yes	No	Creator; producer, writer (3 episodes)
1994–1995	Ellen	Yes	Yes	Writer (5 episodes)
1996–1998	Frasier	Yes	Yes	Writer (8 episodes)
1998	Costello	No	No	Consulting producer
2000	Talk to Me	Yes	No	Creator
2001–2002	Maybe It's Me	Yes	Yes	Creator; writer (3 episodes)
2003	Spellbound	Yes	Yes	Writer (TV film)
2005	Hot Properties	Yes	Yes	Creator; writer (2 episodes)
2005	The Minister of Divine	Yes	Yes	Creator; writer (Unsold Fox pilot)
2009	Maneater	Yes	Yes	Writer (TV miniseries)
2010	The Client List	Yes	No	Writer (TV film)
2010–2015	Hot in Cleveland	Yes	Yes	Creator; writer
2012–2013	The Client List	No	No	Creator
2012–2016	The Soul Man	Yes	Yes	Co-creator; writer
2016	Crowded	Yes	Yes	Creator; writer
2017–2020	Will & Grace	Yes	Yes	Writer
2021	Jefferies	Yes	Yes	Creator; writer
