= Frasier season 2 =

Frasier
- Season 2
- DVD cover
- Showrunner: Christopher Lloyd
- Starring: Kelsey Grammer; Jane Leeves; David Hyde Pierce; Peri Gilpin; John Mahoney
- No. of episodes: 24

Release
- Original network: NBC
- Original release: September 20, 1994 – May 23, 1995

Season chronology
- ← Previous; Season 1 Next → Season 3

The second season of the American television sitcom Frasier aired on NBC from September 20, 1994 to May 23, 1995.

== Cast ==
=== Main ===
- Kelsey Grammer as Frasier Crane
- Jane Leeves as Daphne Moon
- David Hyde Pierce as Niles Crane
- Peri Gilpin as Roz Doyle
- John Mahoney as Martin Crane

=== Special guest ===
- Bebe Neuwirth as Lilith
- JoBeth Williams as Madeline
- John C. McGinley as Danny Kriezel
- Nathan Lane as Phil
- Ted Danson as Sam Malone

=== Special appearance by ===
- Dan Butler as Bulldog
- Shelley Long as Diane Chambers

=== Recurring ===
- Edward Hibbert as Gil Chesterton

=== Guest ===
- John O'Hurley as Thomas Jay Fallow
- Eric Lutes as Tom Duran
- Boyd Gaines as Phil Patterson
- Mike Starr as Billy
- Shannon Tweed as Dr. Honey Snow
- Téa Leoni as Sheila
- W. Morgan Sheppard as Mr. Drake
- Jim Norton as Wentworth
- Harriet Sansom Harris as Bebe Glazer
- Diedrich Bader as Brad

== Episodes ==
No. overall	No. in season	Title	Directed by	Written by	Original release date	Prod. code	U.S. viewers (millions)
25	1	"Slow Tango in South Seattle"	James Burrows	Martin Weiss	September 20, 1994	202	20.7
Frasier is shocked and offended to learn that an old friend (John O'Hurley) has turned a romantic episode from Frasier's past into a popular novel but did not credit him in the acknowledgments. When the writer's apology fails to provide the closure he seeks, Frasier tracks down the woman concerned, his former piano teacher (Constance Towers). Guest Caller: James Spader as Steven
26	2	"The Unkindest Cut of All"	Rick Beren	Dave Hackel	September 27, 1994	201	20.6
When Eddie fathers a litter of puppies by a neighbor's dog, Frasier gets irritated at Martin, who was supposed to have had Eddie neutered. With Martin unwilling to subject Eddie to the procedure, Frasier attempts to arrange it instead. Guest Caller: Lily Tomlin as Rita
27	3	"The Matchmaker"	David Lee	Joe Keenan	October 4, 1994	204	22.4
Sympathetic about Daphne's unsatisfactory love life, Frasier tries to fix her up with Tom Duran, the new station manager (Eric Lutes). Tom is gay, and interprets Frasier's invitation to dinner as romantic interest.
28	4	"Flour Child"	James Burrows	Christopher Lloyd	October 11, 1994	205	23.4
After witnessing a birth, Niles contemplates becoming a parent. Meanwhile, Frasier attempts to retrieve a get-well card for a colleague because he wrote an inappropriate message on it. Guest Caller: Amy Madigan as Maggie
29	5	"Duke's, We Hardly Knew Ye"	James Burrows	Linda Morris & Vic Rauseo	October 18, 1994	203	21.0
Frasier and Niles discover that their successful new investment group is about to tear down Martin's favorite bar, Duke's.
30	6	"The Botched Language of Cranes"	David Lee	Joe Keenan	November 1, 1994	207	23.8
When Frasier makes a disparaging remark about Seattle's weather, he offends his listeners. His attempt to remedy the situation by speaking at a charity dinner makes things worse. Guest Callers: Alfre Woodard as Edna; Sandra Dee as Connie
31	7	"The Candidate"	James Burrows	Chuck Ranberg & Anne Flett-Giordano	November 8, 1994	206	19.2
When the congressional candidate whom Martin supports demeans Frasier on air, he decides to publicly support the man's opponent, Phil Patterson (Boyd Gaines). Patterson confides in Frasier that he believes he was once abducted by aliens, causing Frasier to question his competency to run for public office. Frasier accidentally reveals the story on-air, and Patterson is heavily defeated at the polls. Guest Caller: Sydney Pollack as Holden Thorpe
32	8	"Adventures in Paradise"	James Burrows	Ken Levine & David Isaacs	November 15, 1994	208	21.8
33	9	"Adventures in Paradise"	James Burrows	Ken Levine & David Isaacs	November 22, 1994	209	24.2
After Frasier admires a woman, Madeline Marshall (JoBeth Williams), featured in a magazine article on eligible singles in Seattle, Roz brings them together. They start seeing each other, and travel to Bora Bora for a romantic weekend, only to encounter Frasier's ex-wife Lilith (Bebe Neuwirth) staying at the same resort. Guest Caller: Art Garfunkel as Chester The encounter with Lilith at the end of the preceding episode leads to significant complications on Frasier's romantic getaway. Special appearance by Shelley Long as Diane Chambers Guest Caller: Kevin Bacon as Vic
34	10	"Burying a Grudge"	Andy Ackerman	David Lloyd	November 29, 1994	210	22.5
When Maris is admitted to the hospital for a facelift, Niles and Frasier discover that Martin's former police partner, Artie (Lincoln Kilpatrick), from whom he is estranged, is also hospitalized, and they try to mend the rift. Guest Callers: Betty Comden as Linda; Adolph Green as Walter
35	11	"Seat of Power"	James Burrows	Steven Levitan	December 13, 1994	211	21.1
After Martin bemoans his sons' rarefied tastes and avoidance of all that is ordinary, they try to prove him wrong by fixing the toilet; they make the problem worse, call in a plumber, and find that they have hired Danny Kriezel (John C. McGinley), a bully who tormented Niles long ago, and his brother Billy (Mike Starr), who bullied Frasier. Guest Caller: Macaulay Culkin as Elliott
36	12	"Roz in the Doghouse"	James Burrows	Chuck Ranberg & Anne Flett-Giordano	January 3, 1995	212	24.1
After Bulldog asks Roz to be his producer, Frasier insults her by suggesting that he asked her only because he wants to have sex with her. Roz takes up the position, leaving Frasier with a series of incompetent replacements. As Frasier swallows his pride and prepares to apologize and beg Roz to return, Bulldog does indeed attempt to sleep with Roz. Guest Callers: Carly Simon as Marie; Rosie Perez as Francesca
37	13	"Retirement is Murder"	Alan Myerson	Elias Davis & David Pollock	January 10, 1995	213	21.1
With the help of Niles and Daphne, Frasier uses his psychiatric expertise to help Martin solve an old murder case that has puzzled him for years. Martin takes his findings to the police, gets kudos for solving the case, and at a small celebration gives Frasier credit. However, they discover that Frasier in fact believed a chimpanzee to have been responsible for the crime. Guest Caller: Mary Steenburgen as Marjorie
38	14	"Fool Me Once, Shame on You. Fool Me Twice..."	Philip Charles MacKenzie	Christopher Lloyd	February 7, 1995	216	21.3
Frasier's briefcase is stolen and, because it contains his personal effects, so are his dry cleaning and his car. Shortly thereafter, a woman calls KACL, claiming to have spent the previous night with Frasier and canceling their second date. Frasier decides to confront the thief (Nathan Lane). He corners him in the bar and makes him confess to everything he has done, even having the thief call the police himself. As Frasier tries to find out why he did it, the police walk in and the robber has Frasier arrested, backed up by a woman Frasier failed to flirt with. Guest Caller: Joan McMurtrey as Heather
39	15	"You Scratch My Book..."	Andy Ackerman	Joe Keenan	February 14, 1995	214	19.4
Frasier pretends to be a fan of several insubstantial self-help books in order to pursue a romance with the author (Shannon Tweed). Meanwhile, Niles attempts to cover up the losses when he helps Daphne invest some money.
40	16	"The Show Where Sam Shows Up"	James Burrows	Ken Levine & David Isaacs	February 21, 1995	218	26.4
Sam Malone (Ted Danson), Frasier's longtime friend from Cheers, visits Seattle to seek relationship advice from him. A seemingly straightforward counsel turns into an ethical dilemma when Frasier realizes that he has had an intimate encounter with Sam's fiancée (Téa Leoni).
41	17	"Daphne's Room"	David Lee	Linda Morris & Vic Rauseo	February 28, 1995	217	21.1
Frasier retrieves a book from Daphne's room while she's out, and she is displeased when she finds out. Although he agrees to respect her privacy, he finds himself there again, while trying to return some medication which he took previously.
42	18	"The Club"	David Lee	Elias Davis & David Pollock	March 21, 1995	215	19.8
When Niles hears about openings at an exclusive club that has long fascinated the brothers, Frasier decides that he would also like to try for membership. Guest Caller: Gary Sinise as Sid
43	19	"Someone to Watch Over Me"	James Burrows	Don Seigel	March 28, 1995	222	22.0
Frasier's show is nominated for a radio award, but his concerns about Kari (Renée Lippin), an over-enthusiastic admirer whose attentions verge on stalking, make it a less-than-pleasant evening. Guest Caller: John Lithgow as Madman Martinez
44	20	"Breaking the Ice"	Philip Charles MacKenzie	Steven Levitan	April 18, 1995	223	20.6
After Roz and Frasier talk about emotional connection, Frasier decides to accompany his father and Niles on an ice-fishing weekend in an effort to deepen their relationship.
45	21	"An Affair to Forget"	Philip Charles MacKenzie	Chuck Ranberg & Anne Flett-Giordano	May 2, 1995	220	17.9
Frasier receives a call on air from a woman whose husband he suspects to be having an affair with Maris. Guest Caller: Glenne Headly as Gretchen
46	22	"Agents in America, Part III"	Philip Charles MacKenzie	Joe Keenan	May 9, 1995	221	17.9
When the station rejects Frasier's demand for a raise, he enlists his manipulative agent Bebe Glazer to help.
47	23	"The Innkeepers"	James Burrows	David Lloyd	May 16, 1995	219	17.9
After the brothers hear that Seattle's oldest restaurant is closing its doors, they decide to buy it and become restaurateurs.
48	24	"Dark Victory"	James Burrows	Christopher Lloyd and Linda Morris & Vic Rauseo	May 23, 1995	224	18.9
Frasier tries to cheer up Roz—unhappy because she is missing a family reunion—by inviting her to the birthday party he is throwing for Martin. Guest Caller: Shelley Duvall as Caroline
