= List of Frasier episodes =

Frasier is an American sitcom created by David Angell, Peter Casey and David Lee. It is the third spin-off and a sequel to the sitcom Cheers, which was created by Glen Charles, Les Charles and James Burrows.

The series follows after the events of Cheers, newly divorced psychiatrist Frasier Crane (Kelsey Grammer) leave behind his old life in Boston and relocate to his hometown of Seattle, Washington. He begins a new career as the host of his own radio call-in show, where he is assisted by his sassy, somewhat promiscuous producer, Roz Doyle (Peri Gilpin). Frasier quickly learns from his anal retentive younger brother Niles (David Hyde Pierce) that their disabled father Martin (John Mahoney) is no longer able to live alone, and Frasier reluctantly agrees to take him in, along with Martin's favorite recliner and his dog, Eddie (Moose). In order to help Martin with his physical therapy, he and Frasier ultimately hire a live-in housekeeper and therapist, Daphne Moon (Jane Leeves), a quirky British woman who believes she is psychic. The five quickly form a strange family unit, and Frasier comes to realize that even though his new life may not be what he planned, that does not mean that it is bad.

Frasier was broadcast on NBC for eleven seasons, from September 16, 1993, to May 13, 2004. It has been in syndication since 1997. Although the actual episode titles were rarely formally displayed on-screen, each episode had two or three 'title cards', flashed up on a black backdrop during an episode (usually at the start of one of the three parts of the original US broadcast). These pertained to the particular sequences of the episodes themselves, often in ways which were not immediately obvious. Many referred to classical literature and cultural subjects, while a small percentage were also the overall titles of the episodes. 264 episodes of Frasier were broadcast, with each season containing 24 episodes.

Also, almost every episode had certain scenes starting in medias res, that is, in the middle of a scene, and often ending in the middle of a scene, giving the series its unique structure.

Paramount Home Entertainment/CBS DVD has released all 11 seasons on Region 1, 2 and 4 DVD. A Blu-ray box set was released on November 8, 2022, by Paramount Pictures. The Frasier: The Complete Series box set, contains 33 Blu-ray Discs with some extras and behind the scenes. In addition, the series was made available for streaming through services such as Hulu, Netflix (ended in 2020), Amazon Prime Video, Showtime, SkyShowtime and Paramount+.

== Series overview ==
Frasier seasons
| Season | Episodes | Originally released | | Rank | Viewers (millions) |
| Season | Episodes | First released | Last released | Rank | Viewers (millions) |
|---|---|---|---|---|---|
| 1 | 24 | September 16, 1993 | May 19, 1994 | 7 | 26.4 |
| 2 | 24 | September 20, 1994 | May 23, 1995 | 15 | 21.1 |
| 3 | 24 | September 19, 1995 | May 21, 1996 | 11 | 20.6 |
| 4 | 24 | September 17, 1996 | May 20, 1997 | 16 | 17.5 |
| 5 | 24 | September 23, 1997 | May 19, 1998 | 10 | 18.3 |
| 6 | 24 | September 24, 1998 | May 20, 1999 | 3 | 23.9 |
| 7 | 24 | September 23, 1999 | May 18, 2000 | 6 | 21.8 |
| 8 | 24 | October 24, 2000 | May 22, 2001 | 13 | 15.8 |
| 9 | 24 | September 25, 2001 | May 21, 2002 | 16 | 15.7 |
| 10 | 24 | September 24, 2002 | May 20, 2003 | 32 | 13.1 |
| 11 | 24 | September 23, 2003 | May 13, 2004 | 35 | 12.0 |

== Episodes ==
=== Season 1 (1993–94) ===
| No. overall | No. in season | Title | Directed by | Written by | Original release date | Prod. code | U.S. viewers (millions) |
|---|---|---|---|---|---|---|---|
| 1 | 1 | "The Good Son" | James Burrows | David Angell & Peter Casey & David Lee | September 16, 1993 | 101 | 28.1 |
| 2 | 2 | "Space Quest" | James Burrows | Sy Dukane & Denise Moss | September 23, 1993 | 102 | 27.0 |
| 3 | 3 | "Dinner at Eight" | James Burrows | Chuck Ranberg & Anne Flett-Giordano | September 30, 1993 | 103 | 25.7 |
| 4 | 4 | "I Hate Frasier Crane" | David Lee | Christopher Lloyd | October 7, 1993 | 104 | 24.2 |
| 5 | 5 | "Here's Looking at You" | Andy Ackerman | Brad Hall | October 14, 1993 | 105 | 23.9 |
| 6 | 6 | "The Crucible" | James Burrows | Sy Dukane & Denise Moss | October 21, 1993 | 107 | 22.4 |
| 7 | 7 | "Call Me Irresponsible" | James Burrows | Anne Flett-Giordano & Chuck Ranberg | October 28, 1993 | 106 | 27.0 |
| 8 | 8 | "Beloved Infidel" | Andy Ackerman | Leslie Eberhard | November 4, 1993 | 108 | 27.1 |
| 9 | 9 | "Selling Out" | Andy Ackerman | Lloyd Garver | November 11, 1993 | 109 | 25.0 |
| 10 | 10 | "Oops!" | James Burrows | Denise Moss & Sy Dukane | November 18, 1993 | 110 | 23.2 |
| 11 | 11 | "Death Becomes Him" | Andy Ackerman | Leslie Eberhard | December 2, 1993 | 111 | 25.3 |
| 12 | 12 | "Miracle on Third or Fourth Street" | James Burrows | Christopher Lloyd | December 16, 1993 | 113 | 25.6 |
| 13 | 13 | "Guess Who's Coming to Breakfast?" | Andy Ackerman | Molly Newman | January 6, 1994 | 114 | 30.4 |
| 14 | 14 | "Can't Buy Me Love" | James Burrows | Chuck Ranberg & Anne Flett-Giordano | January 20, 1994 | 112 | 27.1 |
| 15 | 15 | "You Can't Tell a Crook by His Cover" | Andy Ackerman | David Lloyd | January 27, 1994 | 116 | 27.8 |
| 16 | 16 | "The Show Where Lilith Comes Back" | James Burrows | Ken Levine & David Isaacs | February 3, 1994 | 117 | 33.1 |
| 17 | 17 | "A Mid-Winter Night's Dream" | David Lee | Chuck Ranberg & Anne Flett-Giordano | February 10, 1994 | 115 | 32.8 |
| 18 | 18 | "And the Whimper Is..." | James Burrows | Denise Moss & Sy Dukane | February 17, 1994 | 118 | 16.7 |
| 19 | 19 | "Give Him the Chair!" | James Burrows | Chuck Ranberg & Anne Flett-Giordano | March 17, 1994 | 119 | 29.8 |
| 20 | 20 | "Fortysomething" | Rick Beren | Sy Dukane & Denise Moss | March 31, 1994 | 121 | 27.1 |
| 21 | 21 | "Travels with Martin" | James Burrows | Linda Morris & Vic Rauseo | April 14, 1994 | 123 | 25.5 |
| 22 | 22 | "Author, Author" | James Burrows | Don Seigel & Jerry Perzigian | May 5, 1994 | 120 | 26.2 |
| 23 | 23 | "Frasier Crane's Day Off" | James Burrows | Chuck Ranberg & Anne Flett-Giordano | May 12, 1994 | 122 | 22.3 |
| 24 | 24 | "My Coffee with Niles" | James Burrows | David Angell & Peter Casey | May 19, 1994 | 124 | 29.7 |

=== Season 2 (1994–95) ===
| No. overall | No. in season | Title | Directed by | Written by | Original release date | Prod. code | U.S. viewers (millions) |
|---|---|---|---|---|---|---|---|
| 25 | 1 | "Slow Tango in South Seattle" | James Burrows | Martin Weiss | September 20, 1994 | 202 | 20.7 |
| 26 | 2 | "The Unkindest Cut of All" | Rick Beren | Dave Hackel | September 27, 1994 | 201 | 20.6 |
| 27 | 3 | "The Matchmaker" | David Lee | Joe Keenan | October 4, 1994 | 204 | 22.4 |
| 28 | 4 | "Flour Child" | James Burrows | Christopher Lloyd | October 11, 1994 | 205 | 23.4 |
| 29 | 5 | "Duke's, We Hardly Knew Ye" | James Burrows | Linda Morris & Vic Rauseo | October 18, 1994 | 203 | 21.0 |
| 30 | 6 | "The Botched Language of Cranes" | David Lee | Joe Keenan | November 1, 1994 | 207 | 23.8 |
| 31 | 7 | "The Candidate" | James Burrows | Chuck Ranberg & Anne Flett-Giordano | November 8, 1994 | 206 | 19.2 |
| 32 | 8 | "Adventures in Paradise" | James Burrows | Ken Levine & David Isaacs | November 15, 1994 | 208 | 21.8 |
| 33 | 9 | "Adventures in Paradise" | James Burrows | Ken Levine & David Isaacs | November 22, 1994 | 209 | 24.2 |
| 34 | 10 | "Burying a Grudge" | Andy Ackerman | David Lloyd | November 29, 1994 | 210 | 22.5 |
| 35 | 11 | "Seat of Power" | James Burrows | Steven Levitan | December 13, 1994 | 211 | 21.1 |
| 36 | 12 | "Roz in the Doghouse" | James Burrows | Chuck Ranberg & Anne Flett-Giordano | January 3, 1995 | 212 | 24.1 |
| 37 | 13 | "Retirement is Murder" | Alan Myerson | Elias Davis & David Pollock | January 10, 1995 | 213 | 21.1 |
| 38 | 14 | "Fool Me Once, Shame on You. Fool Me Twice..." | Philip Charles MacKenzie | Christopher Lloyd | February 7, 1995 | 216 | 21.3 |
| 39 | 15 | "You Scratch My Book..." | Andy Ackerman | Joe Keenan | February 14, 1995 | 214 | 19.4 |
| 40 | 16 | "The Show Where Sam Shows Up" | James Burrows | Ken Levine & David Isaacs | February 21, 1995 | 218 | 26.4 |
| 41 | 17 | "Daphne's Room" | David Lee | Linda Morris & Vic Rauseo | February 28, 1995 | 217 | 21.1 |
| 42 | 18 | "The Club" | David Lee | Elias Davis & David Pollock | March 21, 1995 | 215 | 19.8 |
| 43 | 19 | "Someone to Watch Over Me" | James Burrows | Don Seigel | March 28, 1995 | 222 | 22.0 |
| 44 | 20 | "Breaking the Ice" | Philip Charles MacKenzie | Steven Levitan | April 18, 1995 | 223 | 20.6 |
| 45 | 21 | "An Affair to Forget" | Philip Charles MacKenzie | Chuck Ranberg & Anne Flett-Giordano | May 2, 1995 | 220 | 17.9 |
| 46 | 22 | "Agents in America, Part III" | Philip Charles MacKenzie | Joe Keenan | May 9, 1995 | 221 | 17.9 |
| 47 | 23 | "The Innkeepers" | James Burrows | David Lloyd | May 16, 1995 | 219 | 17.9 |
| 48 | 24 | "Dark Victory" | James Burrows | Christopher Lloyd and Linda Morris & Vic Rauseo | May 23, 1995 | 224 | 18.9 |

=== Season 3 (1995–96) ===
| No. overall | No. in season | Title | Directed by | Written by | Original release date | Prod. code | U.S. viewers (millions) |
|---|---|---|---|---|---|---|---|
| 49 | 1 | "She's the Boss" | Philip Charles MacKenzie | Chuck Ranberg & Anne Flett-Giordano | September 19, 1995 | 302 | 21.8 |
| 50 | 2 | "Shrink Rap" | David Lee | Christopher Lloyd | September 26, 1995 | 303 | 20.6 |
| 51 | 3 | "Martin Does It His Way" | Philip Charles MacKenzie | David Lloyd | October 10, 1995 | 301 | 25.9 |
| 52 | 4 | "Leapin' Lizards" | Philip Charles MacKenzie | Chuck Ranberg & Anne Flett-Giordano | October 31, 1995 | 305 | 18.6 |
| 53 | 5 | "Kisses Sweeter Than Wine" | Philip Charles MacKenzie | Anne Flett-Giordano | November 7, 1995 | 306 | 19.9 |
| 54 | 6 | "Sleeping with the Enemy" | Jeff Melman | Linda Morris & Vic Rauseo | November 14, 1995 | 307 | 18.8 |
| 55 | 7 | "The Adventures of Bad Boy and Dirty Girl" | Philip Charles MacKenzie | Joe Keenan | November 21, 1995 | 308 | 20.5 |
| 56 | 8 | "The Last Time I Saw Maris" | Philip Charles MacKenzie | Ian Gurvitz | November 28, 1995 | 309 | 22.9 |
| 57 | 9 | "Frasier Grinch" | Philip Charles MacKenzie | David Lloyd | December 19, 1995 | 310 | 24.8 |
| 58 | 10 | "It's Hard to Say Goodbye If You Won't Leave" | Philip Charles MacKenzie | Steven Levitan | January 9, 1996 | 311 | 23.0 |
| 59 | 11 | "The Friend" | Philip Charles MacKenzie | Jack Burditt | January 16, 1996 | 312 | 19.3 |
| 60 | 12 | "Come Lie with Me" | Philip Charles MacKenzie | Steven Levitan | January 30, 1996 | 314 | 21.3 |
| 61 | 13 | "Moon Dance" | Kelsey Grammer | Joe Keenan, Christopher Lloyd, Rob Greenberg, Jack Burditt, Chuck Ranberg, Anne Flett-Giordano, Linda Morris & Vic Rauseo | February 6, 1996 | 315 | 22.9 |
| 62 | 14 | "The Show Where Diane Comes Back" | James Burrows | Christopher Lloyd | February 13, 1996 | 313 | 19.8 |
| 63 | 15 | "A Word to the Wiseguy" | Philip Charles MacKenzie | Joe Keenan | February 20, 1996 | 316 | 20.5 |
| 64 | 16 | "Look Before You Leap" | James Burrows | Chuck Ranberg & Anne Flett-Giordano | February 27, 1996 | 318 | 20.8 |
| 65 | 17 | "High Crane Drifter" | Philip Charles MacKenzie | Jack Burditt | March 12, 1996 | 317 | 20.3 |
| 66 | 18 | "Chess Pains" | Gordon Hunt | Rob Greenberg | March 26, 1996 | 319 | 21.5 |
| 67 | 19 | "Crane vs. Crane" | Philip Charles MacKenzie | David Lloyd | April 9, 1996 | 320 | 20.1 |
| 68 | 20 | "Police Story" | Philip Charles MacKenzie | Sy Rosen | April 23, 1996 | 304 | 21.1 |
| 69 | 21 | "Where There's Smoke, There's Fired" | Philip Charles MacKenzie | Joe Keenan | April 30, 1996 | 321 | 18.2 |
| 70 | 22 | "Frasier Loves Roz" | Philip Charles MacKenzie | Suzanne Martin | May 7, 1996 | 322 | 17.8 |
| 71 | 23 | "The Focus Group" | Philip Charles MacKenzie | Rob Greenberg | May 14, 1996 | 323 | 17.3 |
| 72 | 24 | "You Can Go Home Again" | David Lee | Linda Morris & Vic Rauseo | May 21, 1996 | 324 | 16.8 |

=== Season 4 (1996–97) ===
| No. overall | No. in season | Title | Directed by | Written by | Original release date | Prod. code | U.S. viewers (millions) |
|---|---|---|---|---|---|---|---|
| 73 | 1 | "The Two Mrs. Cranes" | David Lee | Joe Keenan | September 17, 1996 | 401 | 21.77 |
| 74 | 2 | "Love Bites Dog" | Jeff Melman | Suzanne Martin | September 24, 1996 | 402 | 19.76 |
| 75 | 3 | "The Impossible Dream" | David Lee | Rob Greenberg | October 15, 1996 | 404 | 14.5 |
| 76 | 4 | "A Crane's Critique" | Jeff Melman | Dan Cohen & F. J. Pratt | October 22, 1996 | 405 | 15.5 |
| 77 | 5 | "Head Game" | David Lee | Rob Greenberg | November 12, 1996 | 408 | 20.41 |
| 78 | 6 | "Mixed Doubles" | Jeff Melman | Christopher Lloyd | November 19, 1996 | 407 | 18.44 |
| 79 | 7 | "A Lilith Thanksgiving" | Jeff Melman | Chuck Ranberg & Anne Flett-Giordano | November 26, 1996 | 403 | 19.57 |
| 80 | 8 | "Our Father Whose Art Ain't Heaven" | Jeff Melman | Michael B. Kaplan | December 10, 1996 | 406 | 16.93 |
| 81 | 9 | "Dad Loves Sherry, the Boys Just Whine" | James Burrows | Joe Keenan | January 7, 1997 | 410 | 19.10 |
| 82 | 10 | "Liar! Liar!" | James Burrows | Chuck Ranberg & Anne Flett-Giordano | January 14, 1997 | 411 | 18.06 |
| 83 | 11 | "Three Days of the Condo" | David Lee | Michael B. Kaplan | January 21, 1997 | 412 | 19.08 |
| 84 | 12 | "Death and the Dog" | James Burrows | Suzanne Martin | February 11, 1997 | 409 | 15.26 |
| 85 | 13 | "Four for the Seesaw" | Jeff Melman | David Lloyd | February 18, 1997 | 413 | 15.40 |
| 86 | 14 | "To Kill a Talking Bird" | David Lee | Jeffrey Richman | February 25, 1997 | 414 | 17.15 |
| 87 | 15 | "Roz's Krantz and Gouldenstein Are Dead" | Jeff Melman | William Lucas Walker | March 11, 1997 | 415 | 17.36 |
| 88 | 16 | "The Unnatural" | Pamela Fryman | Michael B. Kaplan | April 1, 1997 | 420 | 16.90 |
| 89 | 17 | "Roz's Turn" | Joyce Gittlin | Joe Keenan | April 15, 1997 | 419 | 15.98 |
| 90 | 18 | "Ham Radio" | David Lee | David Lloyd | April 22, 1997 | 417 | 15.39 |
| 91 | 19 | "Three Dates and a Break Up" | Jeff Melman | Rob Greenberg | April 29, 1997 | 421 | 15.77 |
| 92 | 20 | "Three Dates and a Break Up" | Jeff Melman | Rob Greenberg | April 29, 1997 | 422 | 15.77 |
| 93 | 21 | "Daphne Hates Sherry" | Kelsey Grammer | Chuck Ranberg & Anne Flett-Giordano | May 6, 1997 | 423 | 14.66 |
| 94 | 22 | "Are You Being Served?" | Gordon Hunt | William Lucas Walker | May 13, 1997 | 416 | 16.26 |
| 95 | 23 | "Ask Me No Questions" | Jeff Melman | Dan Cohen & F. J. Pratt | May 20, 1997 | 418 | 19.23 |
| 96 | 24 | "Odd Man Out" | Jeff Melman | Suzanne Martin | May 20, 1997 | 424 | 20.01 |

=== Season 5 (1997–98) ===
| No. overall | No. in season | Title | Directed by | Written by | Original release date | Prod. code | U.S. viewers (millions) |
|---|---|---|---|---|---|---|---|
| 97 | 1 | "Frasier's Imaginary Friend" | David Lee | Rob Greenberg | September 23, 1997 | 501 | 21.54 |
| 98 | 2 | "The Gift Horse" | Pamela Fryman | Ron Darian | September 30, 1997 | 502 | 19.56 |
| 99 | 3 | "Halloween (Part 1)" | Pamela Fryman | Suzanne Martin | October 28, 1997 | 506 | 20.72 |
| 100 | 4 | "The Kid (Part 2)" | Jeff Melman | Jeffrey Richman & Suzanne Martin | November 4, 1997 | 507 | 20.01 |
| 101 | 5 | "The 1000th Show" | David Lee | Christopher Lloyd & Joe Keenan | November 11, 1997 | 504 | 18.82 |
| 102 | 6 | "Voyage of the Damned" | Pamela Fryman | Jeffrey Richman | November 18, 1997 | 505 | 17.76 |
| 103 | 7 | "My Fair Frasier" | Jeff Melman | Jay Kogen | November 25, 1997 | 503 | 17.75 |
| 104 | 8 | "Desperately Seeking Closure" | Pamela Fryman | Rob Hanning | December 9, 1997 | 512 | 17.82 |
| 105 | 9 | "Perspectives on Christmas" | David Lee | Christopher Lloyd | December 16, 1997 | 510 | 19.23 |
| 106 | 10 | "Where Every Bloke Knows Your Name" | Jeff Melman | Rob Hanning | January 6, 1998 | 509 | 18.18 |
| 107 | 11 | "Ain't Nobody's Business If I Do" | David Lee | Jay Kogen | January 13, 1998 | 514 | 19.61 |
| 108 | 12 | "The Zoo Story" | Pamela Fryman | Joe Keenan | January 20, 1998 | 511 | 16.61 |
| 109 | 13 | "The Maris Counselor" | Jeff Melman | David Lloyd | February 3, 1998 | 515 | 18.41 |
| 110 | 14 | "The Ski Lodge" | David Lee | Joe Keenan | February 24, 1998 | 518 | 17.55 |
| 111 | 15 | "Room Service" | David Lee | Ken Levine & David Isaacs | March 3, 1998 | 517 | 18.34 |
| 112 | 16 | "Beware of Greeks" | Jeff Melman | David Lloyd | March 17, 1998 | 516 | 16.37 |
| 113 | 17 | "The Perfect Guy" | Jeff Melman | Rob Greenberg | March 24, 1998 | 508 | 18.07 |
| 114 | 18 | "Bad Dog" | Pamela Fryman | Suzanne Martin | April 7, 1998 | 513 | 15.93 |
| 115 | 19 | "Frasier Gotta Have It" | Dan Butler | Rob Greenberg | April 21, 1998 | 520 | 16.11 |
| 116 | 20 | "First Date" | Kelsey Grammer | Rob Hanning | April 28, 1998 | 522 | 19.31 |
| 117 | 21 | "Roz and the Schnoz" | Ken Levine | Jeffrey Richman | May 5, 1998 | 523 | 16.66 |
| 118 | 22 | "The Life of the Party" | Jeff Melman | Suzanne Martin & Jeffrey Richman | May 12, 1998 | 519 | 15.61 |
| 119 | 23 | "Party, Party" | Jeff Melman | David Lloyd | May 19, 1998 | 521 | 17.73 |
| 120 | 24 | "Sweet Dreams" | Sheldon Epps | Jay Kogen | May 19, 1998 | 524 | 21.30 |

=== Season 6 (1998–99) ===
| No. overall | No. in season | Title | Directed by | Written by | Original release date | Prod. code | U.S. viewers (millions) |
|---|---|---|---|---|---|---|---|
| 121 | 1 | "Good Grief" | Pamela Fryman | Christopher Lloyd | September 24, 1998 | 601 | 28.30 |
| 122 | 2 | "Frasier's Curse" | Pamela Fryman | Jay Kogen | October 1, 1998 | 602 | 25.18 |
| 123 | 3 | "Dial M for Martin" | Ken Lamkin | Rob Greenberg | October 8, 1998 | 604 | 25.66 |
| 124 | 4 | "Hot Ticket" | David Lee | Jeffrey Richman | October 15, 1998 | 603 | 22.24 |
| 125 | 5 | "First, Do No Harm" | Sheldon Epps | Jordan Hawley & William Schifrin | October 29, 1998 | 605 | 24.64 |
| 126 | 6 | "Secret Admirer" | Pamela Fryman | Lori Kirkland | November 5, 1998 | 607 | 22.12 |
| 127 | 7 | "How to Bury a Millionaire" | Pamela Fryman | Lori Kirkland | November 12, 1998 | 608 | 22.00 |
| 128 | 8 | "The Seal Who Came to Dinner" | David Lee | Joe Keenan | November 19, 1998 | 606 | 21.68 |
| 129 | 9 | "Roz, a Loan" | Pamela Fryman | Janis Hirsch | December 10, 1998 | 609 | 23.64 |
| 130 | 10 | "Merry Christmas, Mrs. Moskowitz" | Kelsey Grammer | Jay Kogen | December 17, 1998 | 611 | 24.99 |
| 131 | 11 | "Good Samaritan" | Sheldon Epps | Alex Gregory & Peter Huyck | January 7, 1999 | 612 | 24.56 |
| 132 | 12 | "Our Parents, Ourselves" | Pamela Fryman | Janis Hirsch | January 21, 1999 | 614 | 23.59 |
| 133 | 13 | "The Show Where Woody Shows Up" | Pamela Fryman | Rob Greenberg | February 4, 1999 | 615 | 24.83 |
| 134 | 14 | "Three Valentines" | Kelsey Grammer | Rob Hanning | February 11, 1999 | 616 | 25.83 |
| 135 | 15 | "To Tell the Truth" | David Lee | Rob Hanning | February 18, 1999 | 610 | 27.74 |
| 136 | 16 | "Decoys" | Pamela Fryman | David Lloyd | February 25, 1999 | 613 | 25.57 |
| 137 | 17 | "Dinner Party" | David Lee | Jeffrey Richman | March 11, 1999 | 617 | 21.94 |
| 138 | 18 | "Taps at the Montana" | David Lee | David Lloyd | March 25, 1999 | 621 | 23.11 |
| 139 | 19 | "IQ" | David Lee | Rob Hanning & Jay Kogen | April 8, 1999 | 624 | 21.70 |
| 140 | 20 | "Dr. Nora" | Katy Garretson | Joe Keenan | April 29, 1999 | 618 | 21.41 |
| 141 | 21 | "When a Man Loves Two Women" | David Lee | Alex Gregory & Peter Huyck | May 6, 1999 | 619 | 20.04 |
| 142 | 22 | "Visions of Daphne" | Robert H. Egan | Janis Hirsch & Lori Kirkland | May 13, 1999 | 620 | 21.49 |
| 143 | 23 | "Shutout in Seattle" | Pamela Fryman | David Isaacs | May 20, 1999 | 622 | 27.23 |
| 144 | 24 | "Shutout in Seattle" | Pamela Fryman | David Isaacs | May 20, 1999 | 623 | 27.23 |

=== Season 7 (1999–2000) ===
| No. overall | No. in season | Title | Directed by | Written by | Original release date | Prod. code | U.S. viewers (millions) |
|---|---|---|---|---|---|---|---|
| 145 | 1 | "Momma Mia" | Kelsey Grammer | Rob Hanning | September 23, 1999 | 703 | 25.24 |
| 146 | 2 | "Father of the Bride" | David Lee | Mark Reisman | September 30, 1999 | 701 | 23.74 |
| 147 | 3 | "Radio Wars" | Sheldon Epps | Sam Johnson & Chris Marcil | October 7, 1999 | 702 | 21.32 |
| 148 | 4 | "Everyone's a Critic" | Pamela Fryman | Joe Keenan | October 14, 1999 | 704 | 20.93 |
| 149 | 5 | "The Dog That Rocks the Cradle" | Pamela Fryman | Bob Daily | October 21, 1999 | 706 | 22.04 |
| 150 | 6 | "Rivals" | Katy Garretson | Christopher Lloyd | November 4, 1999 | 707 | 20.65 |
| 151 | 7 | "A Tsar Is Born" | Pamela Fryman | Charlie Hauck | November 11, 1999 | 705 | 18.61 |
| 152 | 8 | "The Late Dr. Crane" | Robert H. Egan | Rob Hanning | November 18, 1999 | 709 | 18.94 |
| 153 | 9 | "The Apparent Trap" | Kelsey Grammer | Dan O'Shannon | November 25, 1999 | 708 | 20.49 |
| 154 | 10 | "Back Talk" | Pamela Fryman | Lori Kirkland | December 9, 1999 | 710 | 23.72 |
| 155 | 11 | "The Fight Before Christmas" | Pamela Fryman | Jon Sherman | December 16, 1999 | 711 | 28.54 |
| 156 | 12 | "RDWRER" | Kelsey Grammer | Sam Johnson & Chris Marcil | January 6, 2000 | 712 | 24.08 |
| 157 | 13 | "They're Playing Our Song" | David Lee | David Lloyd | January 13, 2000 | 713 | 19.41 |
| 158 | 14 | "Big Crane on Campus" | Sheldon Epps | Mark Reisman | February 3, 2000 | 714 | 20.47 |
| 159 | 15 | "Out with Dad" | David Lee | Joe Keenan | February 10, 2000 | 717 | 20.27 |
| 160 | 16 | "Something About Dr. Mary" | Wil Shriner | Jay Kogen | February 17, 2000 | 715 | 21.70 |
| 161 | 17 | "Whine Club" | Kelsey Grammer | Bob Daily & Jon Sherman | February 24, 2000 | 716 | 21.26 |
| 162 | 18 | "Hot Pursuit" | Sheldon Epps | Charlie Hauck | March 23, 2000 | 719 | 20.00 |
| 163 | 19 | "Morning Becomes Entertainment" | Pamela Fryman | Rob Hanning & Jay Kogen | April 6, 2000 | 722 | 16.66 |
| 164 | 20 | "To Thine Old Self Be True" | Robert H. Egan | Dan O'Shannon | April 27, 2000 | 718 | 20.39 |
| 165 | 21 | "The Three Faces of Frasier" | Pamela Fryman | Jon Sherman | May 4, 2000 | 721 | 16.75 |
| 166 | 22 | "Dark Side of the Moon" | David Lee | Lori Kirkland | May 11, 2000 | 720 | 22.96 |
| 167 | 23 | "Something Borrowed, Someone Blue" | Pamela Fryman | Christopher Lloyd & Joe Keenan | May 18, 2000 | 723 | 33.70 |
| 168 | 24 | "Something Borrowed, Someone Blue" | Pamela Fryman | Christopher Lloyd & Joe Keenan | May 18, 2000 | 724 | 33.70 |

=== Season 8 (2000–01) ===
| No. overall | No. in season | Title | Directed by | Written by | Original release date | Prod. code | U.S. viewers (millions) |
|---|---|---|---|---|---|---|---|
| 169 | 1 | "And the Dish Ran Away with the Spoon" | Pamela Fryman | David Angell & Peter Casey | October 24, 2000 | 803 | 28.64 |
| 170 | 2 | "And the Dish Ran Away with the Spoon" | Pamela Fryman | David Angell & Peter Casey | October 24, 2000 | 804 | 28.64 |
| 171 | 3 | "The Bad Son" | Sheldon Epps | Rob Hanning | October 31, 2000 | 801 | 18.62 |
| 172 | 4 | "The Great Crane Robbery" | Katy Garretson | Gayle Abrams | November 14, 2000 | 802 | 18.16 |
| 173 | 5 | "Taking Liberties" | Kelsey Grammer | Sam Johnson & Chris Marcil | November 21, 2000 | 808 | 18.06 |
| 174 | 6 | "Legal Tender Love and Care" | Pamela Fryman | Saladin K. Patterson | November 28, 2000 | 809 | 17.85 |
| 175 | 7 | "The New Friend" | Scott Ellis | Bob Daily | December 5, 2000 | 807 | 16.37 |
| 176 | 8 | "Mary Christmas" | Pamela Fryman | Eric Zicklin | December 12, 2000 | 805 | 15.87 |
| 177 | 9 | "Frasier's Edge" | David Lee | Jon Sherman & Dan O'Shannon | January 9, 2001 | 806 | 18.10 |
| 178 | 10 | "Cranes Unplugged" | Sheldon Epps | Lori Kirkland | January 16, 2001 | 813 | 17.86 |
| 179 | 11 | "Motor Skills" | Pamela Fryman | Story by : Sam Johnson & Chris Marcil; Teleplay by : Eric Zicklin | January 30, 2001 | 811 | 17.11 |
| 180 | 12 | "The Show Must Go Off" | Robert H. Egan | Mark Reisman | February 6, 2001 | 814 | 14.23 |
| 181 | 13 | "Sliding Frasiers" | Pamela Fryman | Dan O'Shannon & Bob Daily | February 13, 2001 | 810 | 14.69 |
| 182 | 14 | "Hungry Heart" | Kelsey Grammer | Gayle Abrams | February 20, 2001 | 812 | 16.61 |
| 183 | 15 | "Hooping Cranes" | Kelsey Grammer | Jon Sherman | February 27, 2001 | 815 | 12.91 |
| 184 | 16 | "Docu.Drama" | David Lee | Sam Johnson & Chris Marcil | March 6, 2001 | 816 | 17.72 |
| 185 | 17 | "It Takes Two to Tangle" | Wil Shriner | Rob Hanning | March 27, 2001 | 817 | 15.67 |
| 186 | 18 | "Forgotten But Not Gone" | Pamela Fryman | David Lloyd | April 17, 2001 | 818 | 13.30 |
| 187 | 19 | "Daphne Returns" | Pamela Fryman | Dan O'Shannon & Bob Daily | May 1, 2001 | 819 | 17.57 |
| 188 | 20 | "The Wizard and Roz" | Sheldon Epps | Saladin K. Patterson | May 8, 2001 | 824 | 14.50 |
| 189 | 21 | "Semi-Decent Proposal" | Katy Garretson | Lori Kirkland | May 15, 2001 | 820 | 15.63 |
| 190 | 22 | "A Passing Fancy" | Kelsey Grammer | Jon Sherman | May 15, 2001 | 821 | 15.63 |
| 191 | 23 | "A Day in May" | Kelsey Grammer | Eric Zicklin & Lori Kirkland | May 22, 2001 | 823 | 17.88 |
| 192 | 24 | "Cranes Go Caribbean" | Kelsey Grammer | Mark Reisman & Rob Hanning | May 22, 2001 | 822 | 17.88 |

=== Season 9 (2001–02) ===
| No. overall | No. in season | Title | Directed by | Written by | Original release date | Prod. code | U.S. viewers (millions) |
|---|---|---|---|---|---|---|---|
| 193 | 1 | "Don Juan in Hell" | Kelsey Grammer | Sam Johnson & Chris Marcil | September 25, 2001 | 901 | 19.55 |
| 194 | 2 | "Don Juan in Hell" | Kelsey Grammer | Lori Kirkland | September 25, 2001 | 902 | 19.55 |
| 195 | 3 | "The First Temptation of Daphne" | Kelsey Grammer | Gayle Abrams | October 2, 2001 | 904 | 16.47 |
| 196 | 4 | "The Return of Martin Crane" | David Lee | Dan O'Shannon & Bob Daily | October 9, 2001 | 905 | 15.10 |
| 197 | 5 | "Love Stinks" | Katy Garretson | Saladin K. Patterson | October 16, 2001 | 906 | 15.48 |
| 198 | 6 | "Room Full of Heroes" | Wil Shriner | Eric Zicklin | October 30, 2001 | 903 | 15.41 |
| 199 | 7 | "Bla-Z-Boy" | Robert H. Egan | Jon Sherman | November 6, 2001 | 907 | 14.47 |
| 200 | 8 | "The Two Hundredth Episode" | David Lee | Rob Hanning | November 13, 2001 | 908 | 19.27 |
| SPE | SPE | "200th Special Outtakes" | Kelsey Grammer | Unknown | November 13, 2001 | TBA | 19.28 |
| 201 | 9 | "Sharing Kirby" | Kelsey Grammer | Heide Perlman | November 20, 2001 | 909 | 16.38 |
| 202 | 10 | "Junior Agent" | Scott Ellis | Bob Daily | November 27, 2001 | 910 | 16.42 |
| 203 | 11 | "Bully for Martin" | Stuart Ross | Eric Zicklin | December 11, 2001 | 911 | 14.04 |
| 204 | 12 | "Mother Load" | Sheldon Epps | Lori Kirkland | January 8, 2002 | 912 | 14.31 |
| 205 | 13 | "Mother Load" | Sheldon Epps | Lori Kirkland | January 15, 2002 | 913 | 13.78 |
| 206 | 14 | "Juvenilia" | Katy Garretson | Sam Johnson & Chris Marcil | January 22, 2002 | 914 | 14.76 |
| 207 | 15 | "The Proposal" | Wil Shriner | Rob Hanning | February 5, 2002 | 915 | 18.99 |
| 208 | 16 | "Wheels of Fortune" | Jerry Zaks | Ken Levine & David Isaacs | February 26, 2002 | 917 | 17.78 |
| 209 | 17 | "Three Blind Dates" | Kelsey Grammer | Gayle Abrams | March 5, 2002 | 918 | 14.43 |
| 210 | 18 | "War of the Words" | Sheldon Epps | Saladin K. Patterson | March 12, 2002 | 916 | 14.85 |
| 211 | 19 | "Deathtrap" | Kelsey Grammer | Jon Sherman | April 2, 2002 | 919 | 14.18 |
| 212 | 20 | "The Love You Fake" | Katy Garretson | Sam Johnson & Chris Marcil | April 9, 2002 | 924 | 14.13 |
| 213 | 21 | "Cheerful Goodbyes" | Sheldon Epps | Heide Perlman | April 30, 2002 | 922 | 15.82 |
| 214 | 22 | "Frasier Has Spokane" | Wil Shriner | Eric Zicklin | May 7, 2002 | 920 | 13.56 |
| 215 | 23 | "The Guilt Trippers (Part 1)" | Wil Shriner | Lori Kirkland | May 14, 2002 | 921 | 17.23 |
| 216 | 24 | "Moons Over Seattle (Part 2)" | Sheldon Epps | Bob Daily | May 21, 2002 | 923 | 16.50 |

=== Season 10 (2002–03) ===
| No. overall | No. in season | Title | Directed by | Written by | Original release date | Prod. code | U.S. viewers (millions) |
|---|---|---|---|---|---|---|---|
| 217 | 1 | "The Ring Cycle" | Kelsey Grammer | Jon Sherman | September 24, 2002 | 1001 | 21.12 |
| 218 | 2 | "Enemy at the Gate" | Kelsey Grammer | Lori Kirkland | October 1, 2002 | 1005 | 14.50 |
| 219 | 3 | "Proxy Prexy" | Cynthia J. Popp | Chris Marcil | October 8, 2002 | 1002 | 14.28 |
| 220 | 4 | "Kissing Cousin" | Scott Ellis | Eric Zicklin | October 15, 2002 | 1006 | 13.82 |
| 221 | 5 | "Tales from the Crypt" | David Lee | Saladin K. Patterson | October 29, 2002 | 1003 | 12.72 |
| 222 | 6 | "Star Mitzvah" | Sheldon Epps | Sam Johnson | November 5, 2002 | 1008 | 11.62 |
| 223 | 7 | "Bristle While You Work" | Sheldon Epps | Tom Reeder | November 12, 2002 | 1009 | 17.26 |
| 224 | 8 | "Rooms with a View" | Kelsey Grammer | Dan O'Shannon & Lori Kirkland & Bob Daily | November 19, 2002 | 1007 | 18.33 |
| 225 | 9 | "Don't Go Breaking My Heart" | Jerry Zaks | Bob Daily | November 26, 2002 | 1010 | 14.67 |
| 226 | 10 | "We Two Kings" | Jerry Zaks | Patricia Breen | December 10, 2002 | 1011 | 13.77 |
| 227 | 11 | "Door Jam" | Scott Ellis | Heide Perlman | January 7, 2003 | 1004 | 12.00 |
| 228 | 12 | "The Harassed" | Kelsey Grammer | Chris Marcil | January 14, 2003 | 1014 | 12.40 |
| 229 | 13 | "Lilith Needs a Favor" | Sheldon Epps | Lori Kirkland | February 4, 2003 | 1016 | 14.89 |
| 230 | 14 | "Daphne Does Dinner" | Katy Garretson | Heide Perlman | February 11, 2003 | 1013 | 12.78 |
| 231 | 15 | "Trophy Girlfriend" | Kelsey Grammer | Saladin K. Patterson | February 18, 2003 | 1015 | 12.80 |
| 232 | 16 | "Fraternal Schwinns" | Sheldon Epps | Sam Johnson | February 25, 2003 | 1017 | 13.05 |
| 233 | 17 | "Kenny on the Couch" | David Lee | Bob Daily | March 4, 2003 | 1018 | 12.09 |
| 234 | 18 | "Roe to Perdition" | Jerry Zaks | Jon Sherman | March 18, 2003 | 1012 | 9.42 |
| 235 | 19 | "Some Assembly Required" | Wil Shriner | Patricia Breen | April 1, 2003 | 1020 | 9.25 |
| 236 | 20 | "Farewell, Nervosa" | Kelsey Grammer | Eric Zicklin | April 22, 2003 | 1019 | 9.30 |
| 237 | 21 | "The Devil and Dr. Phil" | Wil Shriner | Sam Johnson & Chris Marcil | April 29, 2003 | 1022 | 11.08 |
| 238 | 22 | "Fathers and Sons" | Kelsey Grammer | Jon Sherman | May 6, 2003 | 1024 | 10.89 |
| 239 | 23 | "Analyzed Kiss" | Katy Garretson | Saladin K. Patterson & Heide Perlman | May 13, 2003 | 1023 | 10.42 |
| 240 | 24 | "A New Position for Roz" | Kelsey Grammer | Lori Kirkland | May 20, 2003 | 1021 | 11.47 |

=== Season 11 (2003–04) ===
| No. overall | No. in season | Title | Directed by | Written by | Original release date | Prod. code | U.S. viewers (millions) |
|---|---|---|---|---|---|---|---|
| 241 | 1 | "No Sex Please, We're Skittish" | David Lee | Bob Daily | September 23, 2003 | 1101 | 14.50 |
| 242 | 2 | "A Man, a Plan and a Gal: Julia" | Kelsey Grammer | Jon Sherman | September 23, 2003 | 1102 | 14.50 |
| 243 | 3 | "The Doctor Is Out" | David Lee | Joe Keenan | September 30, 2003 | 1104 | 11.82 |
| 244 | 4 | "The Babysitter" | Kelsey Grammer | Jeffrey Richman | October 7, 2003 | 1103 | 11.69 |
| 245 | 5 | "The Placeholder" | Sheldon Epps | Lori Kirkland Baker | October 14, 2003 | 1105 | 11.24 |
| 246 | 6 | "I'm Listening" | Sheldon Epps | Heide Perlman | October 28, 2003 | 1106 | 11.00 |
| 247 | 7 | "Maris Returns" | Kelsey Grammer | Chris Marcil | November 4, 2003 | 1107 | 10.21 |
| 248 | 8 | "Murder Most Maris" | Scott Ellis | Sam Johnson | November 11, 2003 | 1108 | 11.86 |
| 249 | 9 | "Guns N' Neuroses" | Scott Ellis | Jon Sherman | November 18, 2003 | 1109 | 11.60 |
| 250 | 10 | "SeaBee Jeebies" | Kelsey Grammer | Patricia Breen | December 2, 2003 | 1110 | 10.68 |
| 251 | 11 | "High Holidays" | Sheldon Epps | Christopher Lloyd | December 9, 2003 | 1111 | 11.71 |
| 252 | 12 | "Frasier-Lite" | Sheldon Epps | Sam Johnson & Chris Marcil & Jeffrey Richman and Jon Sherman & Bob Daily & Patricia Breen | January 6, 2004 | 1112 | 10.92 |
| 253 | 13 | "The Ann Who Came to Dinner" | Scott Ellis | Sam Johnson & Chris Marcil | January 13, 2004 | 1114 | 10.78 |
| 254 | 14 | "Freudian Sleep" | Cynthia J. Popp | Lori Kirkland Baker | February 3, 2004 | 1117 | 12.20 |
| 255 | 15 | "Caught in the Act" | Kelsey Grammer | Joe Keenan | February 24, 2004 | 1116 | 10.11 |
| 256 | 16 | "Boo!" | Katy Garretson | Jeffrey Richman | March 2, 2004 | 1115 | 10.42 |
| 257 | 17 | "Coots and Ladders" | Kelsey Grammer | Heide Perlman | March 16, 2004 | 1118 | 8.25 |
| 258 | 18 | "Match Game" | Katy Garretson | Bob Daily | March 30, 2004 | 1113 | 11.23 |
| 259 | 19 | "Miss Right Now" | Scott Ellis | Ken Levine & David Isaacs | April 6, 2004 | 1119 | 10.36 |
| 260 | 20 | "And Frasier Makes Three" | Scott Ellis | Sam Johnson | April 20, 2004 | 1120 | 10.77 |
| 261 | 21 | "Detour" | Kelsey Grammer | Chris Marcil | April 27, 2004 | 1121 | 12.44 |
| 262 | 22 | "Crock Tales" | Sheldon Epps | Jon Sherman & Bob Daily | May 4, 2004 | 1122 | 14.33 |
| 263 | 23 | "Goodnight, Seattle" | David Lee | Christopher Lloyd & Joe Keenan | May 13, 2004 | 1123 | 25.25 |
| 264 | 24 | "Goodnight, Seattle" | David Lee | Christopher Lloyd & Joe Keenan | May 13, 2004 | 1124 | 25.25 |

== Special (2004) ==
| Title | Directed by | Written by | Original release date | U.S. viewers (millions) |
|---|---|---|---|---|
| "Analyzing the Laughter" | Kelsey Grammer | Paul Barrosse | May 13, 2004 | 17.93 |
Frasier takes a trip down memory lane by explaining to his therapist (Fred Willard) about the past 11 years since he moved to Seattle from Boston while highlights from the show are shown.

== Ratings ==
Frasier : U.S. viewers per episode (millions)

| Season | Episode number | | | | | | | | | | | | | | | | | | | | | | | |
| Season | 1 | 2 | 3 | 4 | 5 | 6 | 7 | 8 | 9 | 10 | 11 | 12 | 13 | 14 | 15 | 16 | 17 | 18 | 19 | 20 | 21 | 22 | 23 | 24 |
|---|---|---|---|---|---|---|---|---|---|---|---|---|---|---|---|---|---|---|---|---|---|---|---|---|
| 1 | 28.1 | 27.0 | 25.7 | 24.2 | 23.9 | 22.4 | 27.0 | 27.1 | 25.0 | 23.2 | 25.3 | 25.6 | 30.4 | 27.1 | 27.8 | 33.1 | 32.8 | 16.7 | 29.8 | 27.1 | 25.5 | 26.2 | 22.3 | 29.7 |
| 2 | 20.7 | 20.6 | 22.4 | 23.4 | 21.0 | 23.8 | 19.2 | 21.8 | 24.2 | 22.5 | 21.1 | 24.1 | 21.1 | 21.3 | 19.4 | 26.4 | 21.1 | 19.8 | 22.0 | 20.6 | 17.9 | 17.9 | 17.9 | 18.9 |
| 3 | 21.8 | 20.6 | 25.9 | 18.6 | 19.9 | 18.8 | 20.5 | 22.9 | 24.8 | 23.0 | 19.3 | 21.3 | 22.9 | 19.8 | 20.5 | 20.8 | 20.3 | 21.5 | 20.1 | 21.1 | 18.2 | 17.8 | 17.3 | 16.8 |
| 4 | 21.77 | 19.76 | 14.5 | 15.5 | 20.41 | 18.44 | 19.57 | 16.93 | 19.10 | 18.06 | 19.08 | 15.26 | 15.40 | 17.15 | 17.36 | 16.90 | 15.98 | 15.39 | 15.77 | 15.77 | 14.66 | 16.26 | 19.23 | 20.01 |
| 5 | 21.54 | 19.56 | 20.72 | 20.01 | 18.82 | 17.76 | 17.75 | 17.82 | 19.23 | 18.18 | 19.61 | 16.61 | 18.41 | 17.55 | 18.34 | 16.37 | 18.07 | 15.93 | 16.11 | 19.31 | 16.66 | 15.61 | 17.73 | 21.30 |
| 6 | 28.30 | 25.18 | 25.66 | 22.24 | 24.64 | 22.12 | 22.00 | 21.68 | 23.64 | 24.99 | 24.56 | 23.59 | 24.83 | 25.83 | 27.74 | 25.57 | 21.94 | 23.11 | 21.70 | 21.41 | 20.04 | 21.49 | 27.23 | 27.23 |
| 7 | 25.24 | 23.74 | 21.32 | 20.93 | 22.04 | 20.65 | 18.61 | 18.94 | 20.49 | 23.72 | 28.54 | 24.08 | 19.41 | 20.47 | 20.27 | 21.70 | 21.26 | 20.00 | 16.66 | 20.39 | 16.75 | 22.96 | 33.70 | 33.70 |
| 8 | 28.64 | 28.64 | 18.62 | 18.16 | 18.06 | 17.85 | 16.37 | 15.87 | 18.10 | 17.86 | 17.11 | 14.23 | 14.69 | 16.61 | 12.91 | 17.72 | 15.67 | 13.30 | 17.57 | 14.50 | 15.63 | 15.63 | 17.88 | 17.88 |
| 9 | 19.55 | 19.55 | 16.47 | 15.10 | 15.48 | 15.41 | 14.47 | 19.27 | 16.38 | 16.42 | 14.00 | 14.31 | 13.78 | 14.76 | 18.89 | 17.78 | 14.43 | 14.85 | 14.18 | 14.13 | 15.82 | 13.56 | 17.23 | 16.50 |
| 10 | 21.12 | 14.50 | 14.28 | 13.81 | 12.72 | 11.62 | 17.26 | 18.33 | 14.67 | 13.77 | 12.00 | 12.40 | 14.89 | 12.78 | 12.80 | 13.05 | 12.09 | 9.42 | 9.25 | 9.30 | 11.08 | 10.89 | 10.42 | 11.47 |
| 11 | 14.50 | 14.50 | 11.82 | 11.69 | 11.24 | 9.58 | 10.21 | 11.86 | 11.60 | 10.68 | 11.71 | 10.92 | 10.78 | 12.20 | 10.11 | 10.42 | 8.25 | 11.23 | 10.36 | 10.77 | 12.44 | 14.33 | 25.25 | 25.25 |

Audience measurement performed by Nielsen Media Research (Note: The viewership statistics in the graph and table are sourced from the citations in the season-specific tables above.)
