= Frasier season 3 =

Season of television series

Frasier
- Season 3
- DVD cover
- Showrunner: Christopher Lloyd
- Starring: Kelsey Grammer; Jane Leeves; David Hyde Pierce; Peri Gilpin; John Mahoney
- No. of episodes: 24

Release
- Original network: NBC
- Original release: September 19, 1995 – May 21, 1996

Season chronology
- ← Previous; Season 2 Next → Season 4

The third season of the American television sitcom Frasier aired on NBC from September 19, 1995 to May 21, 1996.

== Cast ==
=== Main ===
- Kelsey Grammer as Frasier Crane
- Jane Leeves as Daphne Moon
- David Hyde Pierce as Niles Crane
- Peri Gilpin as Roz Doyle
- John Mahoney as Martin Crane

=== Special guest ===
- Mercedes Ruehl as Kate Costas
- Griffin Dunne as Bob
- Donald O'Connor as Harlow Stafford
- Tony Shalhoub as Manu

=== Special appearance by ===
- Dan Butler as Bulldog
- Shelley Long as Diane Chambers

=== Recurring ===
- Edward Hibbert as Gil Chesterton

=== Guest ===
- Patrick Kerr as Noel Shempsky
- Trevor Einhorn as Frederick
- John Carroll Lynch as Franklin
- Harris Yulin as Jerome Belasco
- Jane Kaczmarek as Maureen
- Denise Poirier as Maggie
- Harriet Sansom Harris as Bebe Glazer

== Episodes ==
| No. overall | No. in season | Title | Directed by | Written by | Original release date | Prod. code | U.S. viewers (millions) |
|---|---|---|---|---|---|---|---|
| 49 | 1 | "She's the Boss" | Philip Charles MacKenzie | Chuck Ranberg & Anne Flett-Giordano | September 19, 1995 | 302 | 21.8 |
New KACL station manager Kate Costas (Mercedes Ruehl) has a reputation for being a fearsome perfectionist, and inspiring fear in her subordinates. Frasier refuses her demands to sensationalize his show (such as themed shows and giving priority to "juicier calls"). So he is moved to the graveyard shift as a result, spoiling his sleep patterns and making Roz bitterly resentful. Guest Callers: Matthew Broderick as Mark; Carrie Fisher as Phyllis; Teri Garr as Nancy; Tom Hulce as Keith
| 50 | 2 | "Shrink Rap" | David Lee | Christopher Lloyd | September 26, 1995 | 303 | 20.6 |
Niles and Frasier are in the office of couples therapist Dr. Schachter (Milo O'Shea). Flashbacks show Frasier receiving a call on his show about a recurring dream, which he does not have time to investigate fully, while Niles is having problems with a tenant in his office, a practitioner of scream therapy. When Frasier revealed his discontent with radio psychiatry, and his wish to return to private practice, Niles proposed that the solution to his difficult psychiatrist co-tenant is to replace him with Frasier. The prospect of working together and consulting each other excited the two brothers initially, but they soon fall out. Guest Caller: Blair Brown as Jill
| 51 | 3 | "Martin Does It His Way" | Philip Charles MacKenzie | David Lloyd | October 10, 1995 | 301 | 25.9 |
Frasier's Aunt Louise, who was not popular in the family for her tendency to criticize everyone, has died. Frasier has been left in charge of organizing her memorial and delivering a eulogy, and Niles is responsible for disposing of her ashes. Neither appreciates their task. Meanwhile, Daphne reveals that Martin has a collection of songs in a shoebox which he wrote years ago for Frank Sinatra, always dreaming that one day he may open a concert with them. The problem is that only the words are written down; the tunes are all in his head. Niles and Frasier are keen to help out. Guest Caller: Mary Elizabeth Mastrantonio as Eileen
| 52 | 4 | "Leapin' Lizards" | Philip Charles MacKenzie | Chuck Ranberg & Anne Flett-Giordano | October 31, 1995 | 305 | 18.6 |
Bulldog (Dan Butler) targets a series of pranks at Frasier (which culminates in Frasier singing "Three Little Maids" from The Mikado in a falsetto voice live on air). Frasier decides to retaliate by hiding a lizard in Bulldog’s raffle box, only to watch in horror as Kate becomes his unintended victim. Guest Callers: Billy Crystal as Jack; Ed Harris as Rob
| 53 | 5 | "Kisses Sweeter Than Wine" | Philip Charles MacKenzie | Anne Flett-Giordano | November 7, 1995 | 306 | 19.9 |
Frasier is angling to become the maître de chez of his wine club, so is holding a special wine tasting session in his apartment to try to win club members over. Needing to repair a dent in his floor quickly, he employs Niles's handyman Joe DeCarlo (Tony Carreiro) to fix it. Joe tells him he will be done by midday, but when Frasier returns home a few hours later, he finds his apartment in a state of disarray with holes in his walls and workmen everywhere. Joe tells him that when he plugged in the sander, a circuit blew and this has led to faulty wiring being discovered. At 4:30pm, the apartment is still unfinished, the water is cut off, the gas pipes are damaged, and his guests will arrive soon. Martin tells his sons to give him all the cash they have, which he then offers to the workers to finish the job quickly. Guest Caller: Brooke Adams as Marilyn
| 54 | 6 | "Sleeping with the Enemy" | Jeff Melman | Linda Morris & Vic Rauseo | November 14, 1995 | 307 | 18.8 |
The KACL support staff are indignant when Kate refuses their annual 5% raise. However, they are also too frightened to confront her about it. Even though the decision does not affect the on-air talent, Roz persuades Frasier to rally colleagues round in support of those who are affected (and act as their representative, in place of Noel). They march to Kate's office, but when she comes out everyone flees, leaving Frasier to argue their case. The discussion grows to a fierce argument, which escalates into intense mutual lust, whereupon they kiss passionately before Kate throws Frasier out. Guest Caller: Laura Dern as June
| 55 | 7 | "The Adventures of Bad Boy and Dirty Girl" | Philip Charles MacKenzie | Joe Keenan | November 21, 1995 | 308 | 20.5 |
Frasier and Kate have a moment of passion in the studio, in which "Bad Boy" and "Dirty Girl" accidentally broadcast their tryst to all of Seattle. Martin and Daphne are shocked, while Niles crashes his car. Kate suspends Frasier for a week after the broadcast. She comes round to his apartment later to apologize, and they both end up trapped in a service lift with a bed, a music box and some musk oil. Their passion reignites but they are able to restrain themselves before a serviceman enters. Guest Caller: Cyd Charisse as Polly
| 56 | 8 | "The Last Time I Saw Maris" | Philip Charles MacKenzie | Ian Gurvitz | November 28, 1995 | 309 | 22.9 |
Maris has been missing without trace for three days. Frantic, Niles fears she has been kidnapped, but her credit card transactions indicate she is merely indulging in a shopping spree in New York City, and Niles is relieved. Frasier, on the other hand, is incensed by her callousness. He persuades Niles to confront her about her selfishness. However, rather than apologising, Maris throws Niles out and demands a divorce. Frasier feels responsible, and gives Niles sanctuary at his place, but is unable to talk Maris round. Eventually Maris agrees to take Niles back on the condition that he apologize to her; but he cannot decide whether to do so. Guest Caller: Paul Mazursky as Vinnie
| 57 | 9 | "Frasier Grinch" | Philip Charles MacKenzie | David Lloyd | December 19, 1995 | 310 | 24.8 |
On Christmas Eve, Frasier is excited that Frederick (Luke Tarsitano) is coming to Seattle for the first time. Niles believes he and Maris may reconcile soon, but then discovers she has cancelled his credit cards and cell service. Meanwhile, a postal mix-up means the educational toys Frasier ordered for his son have not arrived. He and Niles brave the mall in an attempt to replace them. First appearance of Frederick Crane in this series. Guest Caller: Ray Liotta as Bob
| 58 | 10 | "It's Hard to Say Goodbye If You Won't Leave" | Philip Charles MacKenzie | Steven Levitan | January 9, 1996 | 311 | 23.0 |
Roz gets Frasier to reveal the identity of "Dirty Girl", with whom he had the on-air tryst. Frasier finds himself thinking of Kate constantly, and wonders if they made the right decision not to pursue a relationship. Daphne encourages him not to let fear of rejection stop him, but just as Frasier broaches the subject with Kate, she reveals she is moving to Chicago. Niles decides to call around later that day with a video of Casablanca, and the ensuing conversation starts Frasier thinking again.
| 59 | 11 | "The Friend" | Philip Charles MacKenzie | Jack Burditt | January 16, 1996 | 312 | 19.3 |
Niles offers horse racing tickets to Frasier; he prefers not to go, as the jockeys remind him of Maris. When Martin also declines the invitation, Frasier realizes that he has a shortage of friends in Seattle. After speaking on his show about friendship, he agrees to meet up with one of his callers. But Bob, a photographer at a discount store, likes wearing a tam o'shanter and has an passion for barbecue. But Frasier finds it difficult to break off the friendship because Bob uses a wheelchair. Guest Callers: Armistead Maupin as Gerard; Griffin Dunne as Bob
| 60 | 12 | "Come Lie with Me" | Philip Charles MacKenzie | Steven Levitan | January 30, 1996 | 314 | 21.3 |
Daphne and Joe (Tony Carreiro) try to conceal the fact that Joe is sleeping over. But when he finds out, Frasier feels uncomfortable and expresses his concern to Daphne. So she decides to look for her own place. After a weekend without her, Frasier and Martin miss her calming presence. Meanwhile, Niles’ separation from Maris sees him left out of several high-profile social events.
| 61 | 13 | "Moon Dance" | Kelsey Grammer | Joe Keenan, Christopher Lloyd, Rob Greenberg, Jack Burditt, Chuck Ranberg, Anne Flett-Giordano, Linda Morris & Vic Rauseo | February 6, 1996 | 315 | 22.9 |
Niles sees Maris‘ picture on the society page with another man. So he plans to take an heiress to the upcoming “Snow Ball,” for which Daphne offers to give him ballroom dancing lessons. When his date cancels, Daphne suggests she go with him. At the ball, Niles and Daphne decide to show everyone he is not mourning his divorce. During a tango, Niles declares his adoration for Daphne, and she reciprocates. He then realizes Daphne thought it was part of their ruse. An attractive former associate of Niles' then gives him her card and invites him to go dancing. At first, Niles declines her proposal, but then changes his mind, and takes the card. First episode directed by Kelsey Grammer. Guest Caller: Jodie Foster as Marlene
| 62 | 14 | "The Show Where Diane Comes Back" | James Burrows | Christopher Lloyd | February 13, 1996 | 313 | 19.8 |
Diane Chambers (Shelley Long) shows up at KACL to invite Frasier to the Seattle performance of her new play. Frasier, still invites her to dinner, determined to flaunt his success and convince her he is over her, despite Niles' insistence he confront her about her leaving him at the altar. Diane initially boasts of her own riches and success, only to break down and later confess she is not doing as well as she claimed. Feeling sorry for her, Frasier agrees to back her play, much to everyone’s chagrin. At the dress rehearsal, he finds it depicts their life at Cheers, with the characters being literal representations of how Diane viewed their old friends: boorish and uncivilized ruffians, and Frasier's character having a cold reaction after he is left at the altar.
| 63 | 15 | "A Word to the Wiseguy" | Philip Charles MacKenzie | Joe Keenan | February 20, 1996 | 316 | 20.5 |
When Maris has a minor traffic accident, the police find a scads of unpaid parking tickets. Martin refuses to exert his influence. So Roz tells Niles about an acquaintance named Jerome Belasco (Harris Yulin), who "makes wishes come true". When Jerome quickly resolves the issue, Niles is so grateful he promises to return the favor "any time". Jerome requests Frasier persuade his reluctant fiancée to set a wedding date; When Frasier meets the fiancée and learns she is unhappy in the relationship, he struggles to find a way to advise against the marriage. Guest Callers: Faith Prince as Brandy; Randy Travis as Steve
| 64 | 16 | "Look Before You Leap" | James Burrows | Chuck Ranberg & Anne Flett-Giordano | February 27, 1996 | 318 | 20.8 |
It is February 29, and this Leap Day, Frasier is encouraging everyone to do something different: he commends a trip to a friend's birthday party in Montana to his father, a new haircut to Daphne, and a public radio message for Roz to reconnect with a crush she met on a bus, while also advising against Niles meeting Maris for sex. Frasier decides to take his own advice and perform a challenging aria ("Ella mi fu rapita/Parmi veder le lagrime") from Verdi's Rigoletto on the PBS telethon that evening, instead of his traditional rendition of "Buttons and Bows". However, Roz's crush turns out to be married and wanting to cheat with her, Martin's plane is forced to make a traumatic emergency landing, and Daphne's haircut turns out horrifically wrong, giving Frasier reservations. At the last second, he decides to sing "Buttons and Bows" again instead, but forgets most of the lyrics live on camera and gives a disastrous performance that Daphne and Martin wind up watching on repeat to entertain themselves.
| 65 | 17 | "High Crane Drifter" | Philip Charles MacKenzie | Jack Burditt | March 12, 1996 | 317 | 20.3 |
Frasier feels he is alone in upholding common courtesy, and loses his patience in a crowded Café Nervosa, forcibly ejecting a man who claimed a table just before him. He is hailed as a hero, and a wave of phone calls to KACL report how people have started emulating him. So, he apologizes to the man he accosted. However, the man threatens to sue, until Niles provokes the man to ensure a counter-suit. Guest Callers: Joan Allen as Lydia; Billy Barty as Chris; Eric Idle as Chuck; Jerry Orbach as Mitch; Jane Pauley as Rochelle; Katarina Witt as Brenda
| 66 | 18 | "Chess Pains" | Gordon Hunt | Rob Greenberg | March 26, 1996 | 319 | 21.5 |
Frasier has acquired a 19th-century Parisian chess set, designed by a student of l'École des Beaux-Arts. Niles is in awe, but Frasier cannot persuade him to play, so he asks his father. Martin professes not to know much about the game but wins conclusively. Frasier demands rematches, but cannot win until Martin deliberately loses a match. Meanwhile, Daphne suggests Niles should get a dog for companionship. So he adopts an extremely thin, highly strung whippet, who refuses to eat or heed a single command, resembling descriptions of his unseen wife, Maris.
| 67 | 19 | "Crane vs. Crane" | Philip Charles MacKenzie | David Lloyd | April 9, 1996 | 320 | 20.1 |
Niles is retained to testify in a high-profile legal action to be broadcast on Court TV; local millionaire Harlow Safford (Donald O'Connor) is, at age 78, apparently showing signs of senility, so his son is trying to get him committed. Niles has agreed to speak as an expert witness to Safford's mental instability. Frasier is persuaded by Safford that his eccentricities are merely his effort to embrace life and make the most of his health while he still can, and give something back to the world that has been kind to him. Frasier decides to testify in favor of Safford, but in court, his senility is confirmed. Guest Caller: Mrs. Fields as Beth
| 68 | 20 | "Police Story" | Philip Charles MacKenzie | Sy Rosen | April 23, 1996 | 304 | 21.1 |
Whilst rushing to deliver Roz to a date, Frasier is stopped for speeding by an attractive police officer, Maureen (Jane Kaczmarek), who agrees not to issue a ticket. Frasier persuades his father to help him get in touch with the officer; they meet at McGinty's where she asks Martin if they can meet again. Martin does not wish to hurt Frasier's feelings, but eventually agrees to go on a date with Maureen. Frasier goes to the bar to look for her, and interrupts the date.
| 69 | 21 | "Where There's Smoke, There's Fired" | Philip Charles MacKenzie | Joe Keenan | April 30, 1996 | 321 | 18.2 |
KACL has a new owner: 85-year-old Texas millionaire Wilford S. “Big Willy” Boone (Richard Hamilton). Frasier learns he owns 30 stations across the US, and could put Frasier's show into national syndication, so he begins a charm offensive. The millionaire asks Frasier to cure his younger mistress of her smoking habit so they can wed. His fiancée turns out to be Frasier's agent, Bebe (Harriet Sansom Harris). Frasier persuades her to quit lest she lose Big Willy's inheritance. Three weeks later, Big Willy has a fatal heart attack at the altar. Frasier consoles Bebe by saying she may yet find another Big Willy.
| 70 | 22 | "Frasier Loves Roz" | Philip Charles MacKenzie | Suzanne Martin | May 7, 1996 | 322 | 17.8 |
Roz has to wear an unattractive lime-green bridesmaid’s dress in a friend’s wedding. The occasion starts her thinking about settling down, and Frasier suggests she look for a man with more substance than superficial flash. Soon afterwards, he and Niles see her at Café Nervosa with Niles’ least favorite patient: a compulsive womanizer called Ben Collins (Michael Mitz). He shares this with Frasier, as one therapist to another, so Frasier cannot tell Roz without contravening his professional ethics. So Frasier struggles to tell her without giving a reason, and Roz begins to mistake his hesitance for something more than friendship. Guest Caller: David Duchovny as Tom
| 71 | 23 | "The Focus Group" | Philip Charles MacKenzie | Rob Greenberg | May 14, 1996 | 323 | 17.3 |
Frasier's radio show is presented to a 12-person focus group, observed by Frasier and Roz from behind a two-way mirror. The reactions are all positive, except for Manu Habib (Tony Shalhoub), who later says he “just does not like the host.” Roz is delighted, but Frasier is obsessed with why Mr. Habib does not like him. Meanwhile, Niles is overcharged for the restoration of a slightly damaged Jackson Pollock at a gallery opening. He has an argument with Daphne, which he finds very exciting, and he later tries baiting her to recreate the experience.
| 72 | 24 | "You Can Go Home Again" | David Lee | Linda Morris & Vic Rauseo | May 21, 1996 | 324 | 16.8 |
Frasier and Roz exchange gifts on the 3rd anniversary of the radio show. Roz gives Frasier a recording of their first episode. Later that day, Frasier overhears Daphne on the phone with her mother, calling him a tyrant who will not allow her a trip to England, in an effort to avoid a visit. Frasier later plays the tape of his first show, and his awkward, shaking voice reminds him of his early days back in Seattle. Guest Caller: Sherry Lansing as Angela

== Reception ==
The season ranked 12th in the season ratings with an average viewership of 13 million households, making it the 7th highest ranking show on the network.
