= Frasier season 1 =

Season of television series

Frasier
- Season 1
- DVD cover
- Showrunners: David Angell; Peter Casey; David Lee
- Starring: Kelsey Grammer; Jane Leeves; David Hyde Pierce; Peri Gilpin; John Mahoney
- No. of episodes: 24

Release
- Original network: NBC
- Original release: September 16, 1993 – May 19, 1994

Season chronology
- Next → Season 2

The first season of the American television sitcom Frasier aired on NBC from September 16, 1993 to May 19, 1994.

== Cast ==
=== Main ===
- Kelsey Grammer as Frasier Crane
- Jane Leeves as Daphne Moon
- David Hyde Pierce as Niles Crane
- Peri Gilpin as Roz Doyle
- John Mahoney as Martin Crane

=== Special guest ===
- Amanda Donohoe as Catherine
- John Glover as Ned Miller
- Bebe Neuwirth as Lilith
- Mako as Sam Tanaka

=== Special appearance by ===
- Dr. Joyce Brothers as herself

=== Recurring ===
- Dan Butler as Bulldog

=== Guest ===
- Kathleen Noone as Aunt Patrice
- Harriet Sansom Harris as Bebe Glazer
- Claire Stansfield as Kristina
- Patrick Kerr as Noel Shempsky
- Edward Hibbert as Gil Chesterton

== Episodes ==
| No. overall | No. in season | Title | Directed by | Written by | Original release date | Prod. code | U.S. viewers (millions) |
|---|---|---|---|---|---|---|---|
| 1 | 1 | "The Good Son" | James Burrows | Story by : David Angell; Teleplay by : Peter Casey | September 16, 1993 | 101 | 28.1 |
Dr. Frasier Crane, formerly of Boston, has recently arrived back in his birthplace of Seattle to restart his life following his painful divorce. His independence is soon compromised by the fact that his father, Martin, is incapable of living by himself and must move into Frasier's apartment. Guest Callers: Linda Hamilton as Claire; Griffin Dunne as Russell; John Mahoney as Martin (using his first name as a cover to thank Frasier)
| 2 | 2 | "Space Quest" | James Burrows | Sy Dukane & Denise Moss | September 23, 1993 | 102 | 27.0 |
After Martin moves into Frasier’s apartment with his physical therapist, Daphne, and his dog, Eddie, Frasier struggles with the loss of his personal space and ensuing tensions with Martin. After repeatedly failing to get any kind of solitary time at home or work, he decides to try forging a bond with his gruff father. Guest Caller: Christopher Reeve as Leonard
| 3 | 3 | "Dinner at Eight" | James Burrows | Chuck Ranberg & Anne Flett-Giordano | September 30, 1993 | 103 | 25.7 |
Frasier and his brother, Niles, decide to treat Martin to a meal at fancy restaurant Le Cigare Volant in an attempt to improve his sense of style. Meanwhile, Niles meets Daphne for the first time and is instantly smitten, despite already being married. Guest Caller: Patti LuPone as Pam
| 4 | 4 | "I Hate Frasier Crane" | David Lee | Christopher Lloyd | October 7, 1993 | 104 | 24.2 |
After being insulted on Frasier's show for a bad review, newspaper columnist Derek Mann challenges Frasier to a fistfight. Although Frasier agrees in the heat of the moment, Martin is angry to later learn he has no intention of going through with it. After learning of the shame he put Martin through when he ducked out of a similar situation as a child, Frasier resolves to meet the challenge. Guest Callers: Joe Mantegna as Derek Mann; Judith Ivey as Lorraine
| 5 | 5 | "Here's Looking at You" | Andy Ackerman | Brad Hall | October 14, 1993 | 105 | 23.9 |
Frasier buys Martin a telescope as a gift. While looking through it, Martin spots a woman with whom he becomes romantically involved. Guest Caller: Jeff Daniels as Doug
| 6 | 6 | "The Crucible" | James Burrows | Sy Dukane & Denise Moss | October 21, 1993 | 107 | 22.4 |
Frasier throws a cocktail party to show off a new painting he has bought, but is humiliated by the artist, who declares it is a forgery. When Frasier's attempts to return the painting to the gallery fail, he plots revenge against the gallery owner. Guest Caller: Robert Klein as Gary
| 7 | 7 | "Call Me Irresponsible" | James Burrows | Anne Flett-Giordano & Chuck Ranberg | October 28, 1993 | 106 | 27.0 |
Frasier gives advice to a caller, Marco, to break off his relationship with his girlfriend, Catherine (Amanda Donohoe), because of his inability to commit. Niles questions Frasier's ethics when he ends up going on a date with Catherine. Guest Callers: Bruno Kirby as Marco; Eddie Van Halen as Hank
| 8 | 8 | "Beloved Infidel" | Andy Ackerman | Leslie Eberhard | November 4, 1993 | 108 | 27.1 |
After accidentally seeing Martin having an emotional meeting with an old family friend at a restaurant, Frasier and Niles begin to wonder whether Martin had an affair while married. Guest Caller: JoBeth Williams as Danielle
| 9 | 9 | "Selling Out" | Andy Ackerman | Lloyd Garver | November 11, 1993 | 109 | 25.0 |
Frasier meets Bebe Glazer (Harriet Sansom Harris), a smarmy talent agent who sweet-talks him into doing a series of product endorsements. He finds himself conflicted when she arranges a television ad for a product he does not support, knowing that the money earned could go toward his son's college fund. Guest Caller: Carl Reiner as Roger
| 10 | 10 | "Oops!" | James Burrows | Denise Moss & Sy Dukane | November 18, 1993 | 110 | 23.2 |
Frasier is told a rumor that one of the KACL on-air staff is getting fired. When sportscaster Bob 'Bulldog' Briscoe is called into a meeting with management, Frasier assumes the rumor is true and accidentally reveals it to him. As a result, Bulldog quits the station while Frasier learns that his job was actually safe. Feeling guilty and feeling pressure from Martin, Frasier decides to go to the station manager and beg for Bulldog's job back, only to learn the rumor was true and it was actually Frasier who was about to be fired, or at least that's what it seemed like at first but gets lucky as the station manager ends up being the one who gets fired. Guest Caller: Jay Leno as Don
| 11 | 11 | "Death Becomes Him" | Andy Ackerman | Leslie Eberhard | December 2, 1993 | 111 | 25.3 |
After the premature death of Martin's physician, who was similar to Frasier in physique, behavior and temperament, Frasier begins to obsess about his own mortality. Putting his affairs in order, he becomes determined to find more about the physician to the point he decides to attend his shiva.
| 12 | 12 | "Miracle on Third or Fourth Street" | James Burrows | Christopher Lloyd | December 16, 1993 | 113 | 25.6 |
Frasier's plans for Christmas with Frederick, Martin and Niles are derailed after Lilith decides to take Frederick to Austria. Already angry, Frasier then has a bitter argument with Martin, and agrees to do the Christmas Day shift at the radio station, which proves depressing. Guest Callers: Mel Brooks as Tom; Rosemary Clooney as Gladys; Dominick Dunne as Jeff; Ben Stiller as Barry; Eric Stoltz as Don
| 13 | 13 | "Guess Who's Coming to Breakfast?" | Andy Ackerman | Molly Newman | January 6, 1994 | 114 | 30.4 |
Frasier is surprised to learn that Martin has been sleeping with a woman from his building. He then broadcasts this fact in his next show, embarrassing the woman and infuriating Martin. Feeling guilty, Frasier resolves to get them back together. Roz is going out with Noel Shempsky, a Star Trek addict. Guest Callers: Piper Laurie as Marianne; Henry Mancini as Al; Elijah Wood as Ethan
| 14 | 14 | "Can't Buy Me Love" | James Burrows | Chuck Ranberg & Anne Flett-Giordano | January 20, 1994 | 112 | 27.1 |
Frasier takes part in a bachelor auction, where he is "bought" by Kristina Harper (Claire Stansfield), a model. He invites her for dinner at his apartment, but when she arrives, Kristina announces that she has some urgent business and needs Frasier to look after her daughter, Renata (Ashley Bank). Frasier learns from Renata that her mother is neglectful, leading him to criticize Kristina heavily when she returns, only to discover that Renata had invented the bad behavior she described.
| 15 | 15 | "You Can't Tell a Crook by His Cover" | Andy Ackerman | David Lloyd | January 27, 1994 | 116 | 27.8 |
After Roz is scammed by a street con, Frasier claims to always be able to spot a criminal, so Martin challenges him to a test: several of his friends will come over to play cards, including one ex-convict. Frasier wins if he can spot the con.
| 16 | 16 | "The Show Where Lilith Comes Back" | James Burrows | Ken Levine & David Isaacs | February 3, 1994 | 117 | 33.1 |
Lilith (Bebe Neuwirth) visits Frasier in Seattle, wondering if there's any chance of reconciliation after she finds a letter from him. Guest Caller: Timothy Leary as Hank
| 17 | 17 | "A Mid-Winter Night's Dream" | David Lee | Chuck Ranberg & Anne Flett-Giordano | February 10, 1994 | 115 | 32.8 |
After Niles has a fight with Maris, he and Daphne have a moment of mutual attraction during an attempt to make a reconciliation dinner. Daphne is stranded at Niles' mansion during a storm, and Frasier must reach them before they do something they both will regret.
| 18 | 18 | "And the Whimper Is..." | James Burrows | Denise Moss & Sy Dukane | February 17, 1994 | 118 | 16.7 |
Frasier discovers that he has been nominated for a local broadcasting award, and becomes obsessed with winning it.
| 19 | 19 | "Give Him the Chair!" | James Burrows | Chuck Ranberg & Anne Flett-Giordano | March 17, 1994 | 119 | 29.8 |
Frasier is tired of Martin's favorite chair and replaces it, but Martin demands his old chair back. The old chair is easily located on the set of a school production, but the recovery proves more difficult. Guest Caller: Malcolm McDowell as Dr. Bruga
| 20 | 20 | "Fortysomething" | Rick Beren | Sy Dukane & Denise Moss | March 31, 1994 | 121 | 27.1 |
Worrying about impending middle age, Frasier strikes up a tentative romance with a shop assistant several years his junior. Guest Caller: Reba McEntire as Rachel
| 21 | 21 | "Travels with Martin" | James Burrows | Linda Morris & Vic Rauseo | April 14, 1994 | 123 | 25.5 |
Frasier, Martin, Niles and Daphne go on a road trip in a Winnebago. They drive over the border into Canada only to learn that Daphne is not allowed to leave the U.S. because she does not have her green card yet.
| 22 | 22 | "Author, Author" | James Burrows | Don Seigel & Jerry Perzigian | May 5, 1994 | 120 | 26.2 |
Frasier and Niles try to collaborate on a book about sibling relationships but end up brawling while developing a case of writer's block. Guest Caller: Christine Lahti as Laura
| 23 | 23 | "Frasier Crane's Day Off" | James Burrows | Chuck Ranberg & Anne Flett-Giordano | May 12, 1994 | 122 | 22.3 |
Frasier falls ill, and KACL restaurant critic Gil Chesterton (Edward Hibbert) tries to steal his time slot in his absence. Frasier begs Niles to take over to prevent this. When Niles unexpectedly runs the show with great success, a feverish Frasier begins to imagine plots against him, and decides to drag himself to the station no matter what. He locks Niles and Roz out of the studio and broadcasts in a state of delirium. Guest Callers: Mary Tyler Moore as Marjorie; Patricia Hearst as Janice; Steve Lawrence as Howard; Eydie Gorme as Lois; Tommy Hilfiger as Robert; Garry Trudeau as Louis; Steve Young as Blake
| 24 | 24 | "My Coffee with Niles" | James Burrows | David Angell & Peter Casey | May 19, 1994 | 124 | 29.7 |
Over their daily coffee, Frasier and Niles discuss life and happiness. For the first time, Niles acknowledges he may have feelings for Daphne. Frasier considers if he is happy with his new life in Seattle.

== Awards and nominations ==
Primetime Emmy Awards

- 1994 Outstanding Comedy Series - Peter Casey, David Angell, David Lee, Christopher Lloyd, Denise Moss, Sy Dukane, Maggie Blanc, Linda Morris, Vic Rauseo - Winner
- 1994 Outstanding Lead Actor in a Comedy Series - Kelsey Grammer (for "The Good Son") - Winner
- 1994 Outstanding Supporting Actor in a Comedy Series - David Hyde Pierce (for "A Mid-Winter Night’s Dream" + "Author, Author") - Nominee
- 1994 Outstanding Directing in a Comedy Series - James Burrows (for "The Good Son") - Winner
- 1994 Outstanding Writing in a Comedy Series - David Angell, Peter Casey, and David Lee (for "The Good Son") - Winner
- 1994 Outstanding Writing for a Comedy Series - Ken Levine and David Isaacs (for "The Show Where Lilith Comes Back") - Nominee

Viewers for Quality Television awards

- 1994 Best Quality Comedy Series – Nominated
- 1994 Best Lead Actor in a Quality Comedy Series (Kelsey Grammer) – Nominated
- 1994 Best Supporting Actor in a Quality Comedy Series (David Hyde Pierce) – WON
- 1994 Best Supporting Actress in a Quality Comedy Series (Jane Leeves) – Nominated

Writers Guild awards

- 1995 Episodic Comedy ("A Mid-Winter Night's Dream") (Chuck Ranberg & Anne Flett-Giordano) – Nominated
