= 48th Primetime Emmy Awards =

1996 American television programming awards

- Date: September 8, 1996 (Ceremony); September 7, 1996 (Creative Arts Awards)
- Location: Pasadena Civic Auditorium, Pasadena, California
- Presented by: Academy of Television Arts and Sciences
- Hosted by: Michael J. Fox; Paul Reiser; Oprah Winfrey

Highlights
- Most awards: Dennis Miller Live; Frasier; Gulliver's Travels; Kennedy Center Honors; Picket Fences; Rasputin: Dark Servant of Destiny (2)
- Most nominations: ER; The Larry Sanders Show (10)
- Outstanding Comedy Series: Frasier
- Outstanding Drama Series: ER
- Outstanding Miniseries: Gulliver's Travels
- Outstanding Variety Series: Dennis Miller Live

Television/radio coverage
- Network: ABC
- Produced by: Al Schwartz
- Directed by: Louis J. Horvitz

The 48th Primetime Emmy Awards were held at the Pasadena Civic Auditorium in Pasadena, California. The awards were presented over two ceremonies, one untelevised on September 7, 1996, and other televised on September 8, 1996. It was hosted by Michael J. Fox, Paul Reiser, and Oprah Winfrey. Two networks, A&E and AMC, received their first major nominations this year. The televised ceremony presented 27 awards.

Frasier took home Outstanding Comedy Series for the third straight year, and won two major awards overall. In the drama field, ER came into the ceremony as the most nominated drama for the second straight year with ten major nominations; it defeated defending champion NYPD Blue to win Outstanding Drama Series. This turned out to be the only major award ER won. No show won more than two major awards.

The HBO comedy The Larry Sanders Show made Emmy history when it became the first show outside the Big Three television networks to receive the most major nominations (10). Furthermore, Rip Torn won the Supporting Comedy actor award, the first for HBO.

Another first came with Amanda Plummer for Showtime's The Outer Limits. Not only was it the first time a cable network won in her category (Guest Actress, Drama) but was Showtime's first ever Acting Emmy win.

For the twelfth and final season of Murder, She Wrote, Angela Lansbury was once again nominated for Outstanding Lead Actress in a Drama Series, she had been nominated for every season of the show, but she was defeated once again. In the process she set records for being the most nominated actress in the category (18), as well as the most nominated actress without winning. Both of these records still stand.

== Winners and nominees ==
=== Programs ===
| Outstanding Comedy Series: Frasier (NBC); Friends (NBC); The Larry Sanders Show (HBO); Mad About You (NBC); Seinfeld (NBC) | Outstanding Drama Series: ER (NBC); Chicago Hope (CBS); Law & Order (NBC); NYPD Blue (ABC); The X-Files (Fox) |
| Outstanding Variety, Music or Comedy Series: Dennis Miller Live (HBO); Late Show with David Letterman (CBS); Muppets Tonight (ABC); Politically Incorrect with Bill Maher (Comedy Central); The Tonight Show with Jay Leno (NBC) | Outstanding Variety, Music or Comedy Special: The Kennedy Center Honors: A Celebration of the Performing Arts (CBS); The 68th Annual Academy Awards (ABC); The Best of Tracey Takes On... (HBO); Dennis Miller: Citizen Arcane (HBO); Sinatra: 80 Years My Way (ABC) |
| Outstanding Television Movie: Truman (HBO); Almost Golden: The Jessica Savitch Story (Lifetime); The Heidi Chronicles (TNT); The Late Shift (HBO); The Tuskegee Airmen (HBO) | Outstanding Miniseries: Gulliver's Travels (NBC); Andersonville (TNT); Hiroshima (Showtime); Moses (TNT); Pride and Prejudice (A&E) |

=== Acting ===
==== Lead performances ====
| Outstanding Lead Actor in a Comedy Series: John Lithgow as Dr. Dick Solomon in 3rd Rock from the Sun (NBC) (Episode: "Dick Smoker"); Kelsey Grammer as Dr. Frasier Crane in Frasier (NBC) (Episode: "You Can Go Home Again"); Paul Reiser as Paul Buchman in Mad About You (NBC) (Episode: "Dream Weaver"); Jerry Seinfeld as Jerry Seinfeld in Seinfeld (NBC) (Episode: "The Gum"); Garry Shandling as Larry Sanders in The Larry Sanders Show (HBO) | Outstanding Lead Actress in a Comedy Series: Helen Hunt as Jamie Buchman in Mad About You (NBC) (Episode: "The Finale"); Ellen DeGeneres as Ellen Morgan in Ellen (ABC) (Episode: "Witness"); Fran Drescher as Fran Fine in The Nanny (CBS) (Episode: "The Hockey Show"); Patricia Richardson as Jill Taylor in Home Improvement (ABC) (Episode: "The Longest Day"); Cybill Shepherd as Cybill Sheridan in Cybill (CBS) (Episode: "When You're Hot, You're Hot") |
| Outstanding Lead Actor in a Drama Series: Dennis Franz as Andy Sipowicz in NYPD Blue (ABC) (Episode: "Closing Time"); Andre Braugher as Frank Pembleton in Homicide: Life on the Street (NBC) (Episode: "For God and Country"); George Clooney as Dr. Doug Ross in ER (NBC) (Episode: "Hell and High Water"); Anthony Edwards as Dr. Mark Greene in ER (NBC) (Episode: "A Shift in the Night"); Jimmy Smits as Bobby Simone in NYPD Blue (ABC) (Episode: "A Death in the Family") | Outstanding Lead Actress in a Drama Series: Kathy Baker as Jill Brock in Picket Fences (CBS) (Episode: "Bottled"); Gillian Anderson as Dr. Dana Scully in The X-Files (Fox) (Episode: "Piper Maru"); Christine Lahti as Dr. Kate Austin in Chicago Hope (CBS) (Episode: "Transplanted Affection"); Angela Lansbury as Jessica Fletcher in Murder, She Wrote (CBS) (Episode: "Death by Demographics"); Sherry Stringfield as Dr. Susan Lewis in ER (NBC) (Episode: "Take These Broken Wings") |
| Outstanding Lead Actor in a Miniseries or a Special: Alan Rickman as Grigori Rasputin in Rasputin: Dark Servant of Destiny (HBO); Alec Baldwin as Stanley Kowalski in A Streetcar Named Desire (CBS); Beau Bridges as President Richard Nixon in Kissinger and Nixon (TNT); Laurence Fishburne as Hannibal Lee in The Tuskegee Airmen (HBO); Gary Sinise as President Harry S. Truman in Truman (HBO) | Outstanding Lead Actress in a Miniseries or a Special: Helen Mirren as DCI Jane Tennison in Prime Suspect IV: Scent of Darkness (PBS); Ashley Judd as Norma Jean Dougherty in Norma Jean & Marilyn (HBO); Jessica Lange as Blanche DuBois in A Streetcar Named Desire (CBS); Mira Sorvino as Marilyn Monroe in Norma Jean & Marilyn (HBO); Sela Ward as Jessica Savitch in Almost Golden: The Jessica Savitch Story (Lifetime) |
Outstanding Performance for a Variety or Music Program: Tony Bennett – Tony Bennett Live By Request: A Valentine Special (A&E); Ellen DeGeneres – The 38th Annual Grammy Awards (CBS); Whoopi Goldberg – The 68th Annual Academy Awards (ABC); Tracey Ullman – The Best of Tracey Takes On... (HBO); Robin Williams – Comic Relief VII (HBO)

==== Supporting performances ====
| Outstanding Supporting Actor in a Comedy Series: Rip Torn as Arthur in The Larry Sanders Show (HBO) (Episodes: "Arthur After Hours" + "The P.A."); Jason Alexander as George Costanza in Seinfeld (NBC) (Episodes: "The Pool Guy" + "The Invitations"); David Hyde Pierce as Dr. Niles Crane in Frasier (NBC) (Episodes: "The Last Time I Saw Maris" + "Moon Dance"); Michael Richards as Cosmo Kramer in Seinfeld (NBC) (Episodes: "The Pool Guy" + "The Wait Out"); Jeffrey Tambor as Hank Kingsley in The Larry Sanders Show (HBO) (Episodes: "Hank's New Assistant" + "Nothing Personal") | Outstanding Supporting Actress in a Comedy Series: Julia Louis-Dreyfus as Elaine Benes in Seinfeld (NBC) (Episodes: "The Soup Nazi" + "The Wait Out"); Christine Baranski as Maryann Thorpe in Cybill (CBS) (Episodes: "A Who's Who for What's His Name" + "Wedding Bell Blues"); Janeane Garofalo as Paula in The Larry Sanders Show (HBO) (Episodes: "Conflict of Interest" + "I Was a Teenage Lesbian"); Jayne Meadows as Alice Morgan-DuPont-Sutting-Cushing-Ferruke in High Society (CBS) (Episodes: "Family Val's" + "Alice Doesn't Pump Here Anymore"); Renée Taylor as Sylvia Fine in The Nanny (CBS) (Episodes: "Where's the Pearls?" + "The Cantor Show") |
| Outstanding Supporting Actor in a Drama Series: Ray Walston as Henry Bone in Picket Fences (CBS) (Episodes: "Witness for the Prosecution" + "My Romance"); Héctor Elizondo as Dr. Phillip Watters in Chicago Hope (CBS) (Episodes: "A Coupla Stiffs" + "Sweet Surrender"); James McDaniel as Arthur Fancy in NYPD Blue (ABC) (Episodes: "The Backboard Jungle" + "Cold Heaters"); Stanley Tucci as Richard Cross in Murder One (ABC) (Episodes: "Chapter One" + "Chapter Twenty"); Noah Wyle as Dr. John Carter in ER (NBC) (Episodes: "The Right Thing" + "John Carter, M.D.") | Outstanding Supporting Actress in a Drama Series: Tyne Daly as Alice Henderson in Christy (CBS) (Episodes: "Echoes" + The Road Home); Barbara Bosson as Miriam Grasso in Murder One (ABC) (Episodes: "Chapter Eighteen" + "Chapter Twenty"); Sharon Lawrence as Sylvia Costas in NYPD Blue (ABC) (Episodes: "Auntie Maimed" + "Closing Time"); Julianna Margulies as Carol Hathaway in ER (NBC) (Episodes: "Home" + "The Healers"); Gail O'Grady as Donna Abandando in NYPD Blue (ABC) (Episodes: "Auntie Maimed" + "A Death in the Family") |
| Outstanding Supporting Actor in a Miniseries or a Special: Tom Hulce as Peter Patrone in The Heidi Chronicles (TNT); Andre Braugher as Benjamin O. Davis in The Tuskegee Airmen (HBO); John Goodman as Harold 'Mitch' Mitchell in A Streetcar Named Desire (CBS); Ian McKellen as Tsar Nicholas II in Rasputin: Dark Servant of Destiny (HBO); Treat Williams as Michael Ovitz in The Late Shift (HBO) | Outstanding Supporting Actress in a Miniseries or a Special: Greta Scacchi as Tsarina Alexandra in Rasputin: Dark Servant of Destiny (HBO); Kathy Bates as Helen Kushnick in The Late Shift (HBO); Diana Scarwid as Bess Truman in Truman (HBO); Mare Winningham as Sheila in The Boys Next Door (CBS); Alfre Woodard as Queen of Brobdingnag in Gulliver's Travels (NBC) |

=== Directing ===
| Outstanding Individual Achievement in Directing for a Comedy Series: Friends (NBC): "The One After the Superbowl" – Michael Lembeck; 3rd Rock from the Sun (NBC): "Pilot" – James Burrows; The Larry Sanders Show (HBO): "Arthur After Hours" – Todd Holland; The Larry Sanders Show (HBO): "I Was a Teenage Lesbian" – Michael Lehmann; Seinfeld (NBC): "The Soup Nazi" – Andy Ackerman | Outstanding Individual Achievement in Directing for a Drama Series: Chicago Hope (CBS): "Leave of Absence" – Jeremy Kagan; ER (NBC): "The Healers" – Mimi Leder; ER (NBC): "Hell and High Water" – Christopher Chulack; Murder One (ABC): "Chapter One" – Charles Haid; NYPD Blue (ABC): "The Backboard Jungle" – Mark Tinker |
| Outstanding Individual Achievement in Directing for a Variety or Music Program: The Kennedy Center Honors: A Celebration of the Performing Arts (CBS) – Louis J. Horvitz; The 68th Annual Academy Awards (ABC) – Jeff Margolis; Late Show with David Letterman (CBS) – Jerry Foley; Marsalis on Music (PBS): "Sousa to Satchmo" – Michael Lindsay-Hogg; The Tonight Show with Jay Leno (NBC) – Ellen Brown | Outstanding Individual Achievement in Directing for a Miniseries or a Special: Andersonville (TNT) – John Frankenheimer; Almost Golden: The Jessica Savitch Story (Lifetime) – Peter Werner; Gulliver's Travels (NBC) – Charles Sturridge; The Heidi Chronicles (TNT) – Paul Bogart; The Late Shift (HBO) – Betty Thomas |

=== Writing ===
| Outstanding Individual Achievement in Writing for a Comedy Series: Frasier (NBC): "Moon Dance" – Joe Keenan, Christopher Lloyd, Rob Greenberg, Jack Burditt, Chuck Ranberg, Anne Flett-Giordano, Linda Morris and Vic Rauseo; The Larry Sanders Show (HBO): "Arthur After Hours" – Peter Tolan; The Larry Sanders Show (HBO): "Hank's Sex Tape" – Jon Vitti; The Larry Sanders Show (HBO): "Roseanne's Return" – Story by : Garry Shandling Teleplay by : Maya Forbes and Steven Levitan; Seinfeld (NBC): "The Soup Nazi" – Spike Feresten | Outstanding Individual Achievement in Writing for a Drama Series: The X-Files (Fox): "Clyde Bruckman's Final Repose" – Darin Morgan; ER (NBC): "The Healers" – John Wells; ER (NBC): "Hell and High Water" – Neal Baer; Murder One (ABC): "Chapter One" – Story by : Steven Bochco, Charles H. Eglee and Channing Gibson Teleplay by : Charles H. Eglee, Channing Gibson, Steven Bochco and David Milch; NYPD Blue (ABC): "The Blackboard Jungle" – Story by : William L. Morris Teleplay by : David Mills |
| Outstanding Individual Achievement in Writing for a Variety or Music Program: Dennis Miller Live (HBO); Late Night with Conan O'Brien (NBC); Late Show with David Letterman Video Special II (CBS); Politically Incorrect with Bill Maher (Comedy Central); Tracey Takes On... (HBO) | Outstanding Individual Achievement in Writing for a Miniseries or a Special: Gulliver's Travels (NBC) – Simon Moore; The Late Shift (HBO) – Bill Carter and George Armitage; Pride and Prejudice (A&E) – Andrew Davies; The Tuskegee Airmen (HBO) – Story by : T. S. Cook and Robert Williams Teleplay by : Trey Ellis, Ron Hutchinson and Paris Qualles; Truman (HBO) – Thomas Rickman |

== Most major nominations ==
Networks with multiple major nominations (Note: "Major" constitutes the categories listed above: Program, Acting, Directing, and Writing. Does not include the technical categories.)
| Network | No. of Nominations |
|---|---|
| NBC | 45 |
| HBO | 35 |
| CBS | 27 |
| ABC | 19 |

Programs with multiple major nominations
| Program | Category | Network | No. of Nominations |
|---|---|---|---|
| ER | Drama | NBC | 10 |
| The Larry Sanders Show | Comedy | HBO | 10 |
| NYPD Blue | Drama | ABC | 8 |
| Seinfeld | Comedy | NBC | 7 |
| The Late Shift | Movie | HBO | 5 |
| Chicago Hope | Drama | CBS | 4 |
| Frasier | Comedy | NBC | 4 |
| Gulliver's Travels | Miniseries | NBC | 4 |
| Murder One | Drama | ABC | 4 |
| Truman | Movie | HBO | 4 |
| The Tuskegee Airmen | Movie | HBO | 4 |
| The 68th Annual Academy Awards | Variety | ABC | 3 |
| Almost Golden: The Jessica Savitch Story | Movie | Lifetime | 3 |
| The Heidi Chronicles | Movie | TNT | 3 |
| Mad About You | Comedy | NBC | 3 |
| Rasputin: Dark Servant of Destiny | Movie | HBO | 3 |
| A Streetcar Named Desire | Movie | CBS | 3 |
| The X-Files | Drama | Fox | 3 |
| 3rd Rock from the Sun | Comedy | NBC | 2 |
| Andersonville | Miniseries | TNT | 2 |
| The Best of Tracey Takes On... | Variety | HBO | 2 |
| Cybill | Comedy | CBS | 2 |
| Dennis Miller Live | Variety | HBO | 2 |
| Friends | Comedy | NBC | 2 |
| The Kennedy Center Honors | Variety | CBS | 2 |
| Late Show with David Letterman | Variety | CBS | 2 |
| The Nanny | Comedy | CBS | 2 |
| Norma Jean & Marilyn | Movie | HBO | 2 |
| Picket Fences | Drama | CBS | 2 |
| Politically Incorrect with Bill Maher | Variety | Comedy Central | 2 |
| Pride and Prejudice | Miniseries | A&E | 2 |
| The Tonight Show with Jay Leno | Variety | NBC | 2 |

== Most major awards ==
Networks with multiple major awards
| Network | No. of Awards |
|---|---|
| NBC | 9 |
| CBS | 6 |
| HBO | 6 |
| TNT | 2 |

Programs with multiple major awards
| Program | Category | Network | No. of Awards |
|---|---|---|---|
| Dennis Miller Live | Variety | HBO | 2 |
| Frasier | Comedy | NBC | 2 |
| Gulliver's Travels | Miniseries | NBC | 2 |
| The Kennedy Center Honors | Variety | CBS | 2 |
| Picket Fences | Drama | CBS | 2 |
| Rasputin: Dark Servant of Destiny | Movie | HBO | 2 |

== In Memoriam ==
- Martin Balsam
- Erma Bombeck
- George Burns
- John Chancellor
- Vince Edwards
- Herb Edelman
- Ella Fitzgerald
- Gene Kelly
- Dean Martin
- Audrey Meadows
- Greg Morris
- David Opatoshu
- McLean Stevenson
- Jack Weston
