= Roomies (TV series) =

- Genre: Sitcom
- Created by: Sy Rosen
- Written by: Linda Morris; Vic Rauseo; Sy Rosen
- Directed by: Jim Drake; John Tracy
- Starring: Burt Young; Corey Haim; Jane Daly; Sean Sullivan; Joshua Nelson; Michael Lesco; Robert Reames; Larry Wray; Scotty Gelt
- Country of origin: United States
- Original language: English
- No. of seasons: 1
- No. of episodes: 8

Production
- Executive producers: Coleman Mitchell; Sy Rosen
- Producers: Linda Morris; Vic Rauseo
- Camera setup: Multi-camera
- Running time: 30 minutes
- Production companies: Swany Inc. NBC Productions

Original release
- Network: NBC
- Release: March 19 – May 15, 1987

Roomies is an American sitcom television series created by Sy Rosen, that aired on NBC from March 19 until May 15, 1987. Reruns of the series later aired on Saturday mornings in 1991.

== Plot ==
The series centered on Nick Chase, a 42-year old former drill instructor who has retired from the U.S. Marine Corps and is now taking advantage of the GI Bill to attend Saginaw University. He gets assigned to room with Matthew Wiggins, 14-year old "boy genius", who has also enrolled at Saginaw to study marine biology. Nick does not like this arrangement at first, but when he sees Matthew is serious about his studies, he appreciates avoiding the stereotypical raunchiness and zaniness associated with college students and sees the same discipline in Matthew that he saw in his recruits, and the two form a partnership, trying to help each other out. Among those shown were a trio of 'Singing Freshman' who sang through the hallways.

== Trivia ==
Burt Young himself served in the U. S. Marine Corps from 1957 to 1959. The "recruits" he was marching in the opening credits were real Marines from the Marine Barracks at the Seal Beach Naval Weapon Station.

== Cast ==
- Burt Young as Nick Chase
- Corey Haim as Matthew Wiggins
- Sean Gregory Sullivan as Carl
- Jane Daly as Ms. Adler
- Joshua Nelson as Sheldon
- Michael Lesca as singing freshman
- Robert Rheames as singing freshman
- Larry Wray as singing freshman

== Episodes ==
No.	Title	Directed by	Written by	Original release date
1	"Pilot"	John Tracy	Sy Rosen	March 19, 1987
Nick encourages Matthew to ask out a girl who, at the moment, is 200 miles away.
2	"Wrestling"	John Tracy	Coleman Mitchell, Geoffrey Neigher & Sy Rosen	March 27, 1987
Nick thinks college wrestling might broaden Matthew's horizons, but his first official match isn't made in heaven.
3	"The One That Got Away"	John Tracy	Linda Morris & Vic Rauseo	April 3, 1987
Matt and Nick raid the science building to save a rare fish from dying in captivity.
4	"To Tell the Truth"	Jim Drake	Hollis Rich	April 10, 1987
Nick tries some self-analysis after he follows a date with his psychology professor with a visit to another woman.
5	"The Ditch"	Jim Drake	Richard Marcus	April 24, 1987
Nick roars with anger when a film festival audience roars with laughter at his starring role in the Marine training film Digging a Ditch.
6	"Bobby Midnight"	Jim Drake	Sybil Adelman & Martin Sage	May 1, 1987
Matthew creates an uproar among the campus women in his secret life as disc jockey Bobby Midnight.
7	"Obsession"	Jim Drake	Hollis Rich & Lydia Woodward	May 8, 1987
When Matthew and his girlfriend are torn apart by their passion for science, Nick's advice to patch things up leads him to a reconciliation of his own.
8	"Mid-Term Fever"	Jim Drake	Linda Morris & Vic Rauseo	May 15, 1987
His first bout with mid-term fever sends Nick reeling towards home to recuperate.
