= Fortysomething =

Fortysomething may refer to:

- Fortysomething (term), a person aged between 40 and 49 years
- Fortysomething (TV series), a UK television series with Hugh Laurie
- "Fortysomething" (Frasier episode), an episode of the TV series Frasier
