= Christopher Lloyd (TV producer) =

American TV producer and screenwriter (born 1960)

- Born: June 18, 1960 (age 66); Waterbury, Connecticut, U.S.
- Occupations: Television producer; screenwriter
- Years active: 1986–present
- Notable work: Frasier, Modern Family
- Spouse: Arleen Sorkin (m. 1995; died 2023)
- Children: 2
- Relatives: David Lloyd (father)

Christopher Lloyd (born June 18, 1960) is an American television producer and screenwriter. Lloyd is the co-creator and executive producer of the ABC mockumentary family sitcom Modern Family, which he co-created and produced with Steven Levitan. Lloyd has had an extensive career on many series, primarily Frasier.

Lloyd has won 12 Primetime Emmy Awards for his work on Modern Family and Frasier. He holds the record for Primetime Emmy awards as either a comedy or drama series producer.

== Career ==
Lloyd began screenwriting with the first four seasons of The Golden Girls. He then wrote for the comedy Wings; then Frasier, where he became its showrunner. While he was executive producer, Frasier won the Primetime Emmy Award for Outstanding Comedy Series for five consecutive years, the first time any series had done so. Lloyd left Frasier after its seventh season, then returned to helm its final (eleventh) season. He then produced the series Out of Practice (where he first worked with Modern Family's Ty Burrell); Back To You; and Modern Family, which also won the Emmy Award for Outstanding Comedy Series for five consecutive years. As a screenwriter, Lloyd's work includes the animated feature film Flushed Away (2006), for which he received an Annie Award. In 2000, he received an overall deal at Paramount. He quit in 2006 to join Fox in partnership with Steven Levitan.

== Personal life ==
Lloyd was born in Waterbury, Connecticut, the son of Arline and sitcom writer David Lloyd (1934–2009). From 1995 until her death in 2023, he was married to actress, writer, and voiceover performer Arleen Sorkin, with whom he had two sons, Eli and Owen.

== Filmography ==
Year	Title	Credited as		Network
Year	Title	Writer	Producer	Network
1986–1989	The Golden Girls	Yes	No	NBC
1991–1993	Wings	Yes	Yes	NBC
1993–2004	Frasier	Yes	Executive	NBC
2005–2006	Out of Practice	Yes	Executive	CBS
2007–2008	Back to You	Yes	Executive	Fox
2009–2020	Modern Family	Yes	Executive	ABC
TBA	Untitled Alec Baldwin/Kelsey Grammer project	Yes	Executive	TBA

== Writing credits ==
The Golden Girls

- "Second Motherhood"
- “'Twas the Nightmare Before Christmas”
- "The Sisters"
- "Dorothy's Prized Pupil"
- "Nothing to Fear But Fear Itself"
- "Strange Bedfellows"
- "The Artist"
- "Mixed Blessings"
- "The One That Got Away"
- "Scared Straight"
- "Blind Date"
- "Little Sister"

Wings

- "Marriage, Italian Style"
- "The Taming of the Shrew"
- "Take My Life, Please"
- "Lifeboat"
- "It May Have Happened One Night"
- "Goodbye Old Friend"

Frasier

- "I Hate Frasier Crane"
- "Miracle on Third or Fourth Street"
- "Flour Child"
- "Fool Me Once, Shame on You..."
- "Dark Victory"
- "Shrink Rap"
- "Moon Dance" (with Joe Keenan, Rob Greenberg, Jack Burditt, Chuck Ranberg, Anne Flett-Giordano, Linda Morris and Vic Rauseo won for Outstanding Writing for a Comedy Series at 48th Primetime Emmy Awards)
- "The Show Where Diane Comes Back"
- "Mixed Doubles"
- "The 1000th Show" (with Joe Keenan)
- "Perspectives on Christmas"
- "Good Grief"
- "Rivals"
- "Something Borrowed, Someone Blue" (with Joe Keenan)
- "High Holidays"
- "Goodnight, Seattle" (with Joe Keenan) (Series Finale)

Modern Family

- "Pilot" (with Steven Levitan and won for Episodic Comedy at Writers Guild of America Awards 2009 and Outstanding Writing for a Comedy Series at the 62nd Primetime Emmy Awards)
- "Coal Digger"
- "Up All Night"
- "Manny Get Your Gun" (story credits)
- "Party Crasher" (with Danny Zuker)"
- "The Feud" (story credits)
- "The Wedding (Part 2)" (with Megan Ganz and Dan O'Shannon)
- "Legacy" (with Jack Burditt)
- "Finale (Part 2)" (with Jack Burditt, Elaine Ko, Danny Zucker, Vali Chandrasekaran, Brad Walsh and Paul Corrigan)

== Producing credits ==
- Dream for an Insomniac (1996)
