= Life with Lucy =

American sitcom (1986)

- Created by: Bob Carroll Jr.; Madelyn Davis
- Starring: Lucille Ball; Gale Gordon; Ann Dusenberry; Larry Anderson; Jenny Lewis; Philip J. Amelio II; Donovan Scott
- Theme music composer: Martin Silvestri; Jeremy Stone; Joel Higgins
- Opening theme: "Every Day Is Better Than Before" by Eydie Gormé
- Composer: Allyn Ferguson
- Country of origin: United States
- Original language: English
- No. of seasons: 1
- No. of episodes: 13 (5 unaired) (Note: 13 episodes were produced, but 5 remained unaired. A fourteenth episode was written, but never produced) (list of episodes)

Production
- Executive producers: Aaron Spelling; Gary Morton; Douglas S. Cramer
- Producers: E. Duke Vincent; Madelyn Davis; Bob Carroll Jr.; Linda Morris; Vic Rauseo
- Running time: 30 minutes
- Production companies: Lucille Ball Productions; Spelling Television

Original release
- Network: ABC
- Release: September 20 – November 15, 1986

Related
- The Lucy Show; Here's Lucy

Life with Lucy is an American sitcom starring Lucille Ball. Created by Bob Carroll Jr. and Madelyn Davis, the series aired for one season on ABC from September 20 to November 15, 1986. It is the only Lucille Ball sitcom to not air on CBS.

Developed amidst an industry-wide interest in comeback vehicles, ABC and producer Aaron Spelling coaxed Ball out of retirement for a new series. Unlike Ball's previous sitcoms, Life with Lucy was a failure in the ratings and poorly received by critics and viewers alike. Only eight out of the 13 episodes produced were aired before ABC cancelled the series. Its cancellation devastated her. This was the last television series or film she starred in before her death in 1989.

== Premise ==
Lucy Barker, a recently widowed grandmother, has inherited her husband Sam's half interest in a hardware store in South Pasadena, California, the other half being owned by his business partner, widower Curtis McGibbon (Gale Gordon). Lucy insists on "helping" in the store, even though when her husband was alive, she had taken no part in the business and hence knows nothing about it. The unlikely partners are also in-laws, her daughter Margo being married to his son Ted. And all of them, along with their young grandchildren Becky and Kevin, live together.

== Cast ==
=== Main ===
- Lucille Ball as Lucille "Lucy" Barker (née Everett)
- Gale Gordon as Curtis McGibbon
- Ann Dusenberry as Margot "Margo" Barker McGibbon
- Larry Anderson as Theodore "Ted" McGibbon
- Jenny Lewis as Rebecca "Becky" McGibbon
- Philip J. Amelio II as Kevin McGibbon
- Donovan Scott as Leonard Stoner

=== Recurring ===
- Kellie Martin as Patty
- Brandon Call as Max
- Tom Williams as various voice overs

=== Notable guest stars ===
- John Ritter as himself ("Lucy Makes a Hit with John Ritter")
- Peter Graves as Ben Matthews ("Love Among the Two-by-Fours")
- Audrey Meadows as Audrey ("Mother of the Bride")

== Episodes ==
No.	Title	Directed by	Written by	Original release date	Prod. code
1	"One Good Grandparent Deserves Another"	Peter Baldwin	Bob Carroll Jr. & Madelyn Davis	September 20, 1986	101
After the death of her husband, newly widowed Lucy Barker (Lucille Ball) moves in with her daughter Margo's family, which includes son-in-law Ted, and grandchildren Becky and Kevin. She also takes interest in her late husband's hardware store, which he ran with Ted's father Curtis McGibbon (Gale Gordon). Lucy attempts to run the store while Curtis is on vacation in Hawaii, frustrating him when he returns. When a jumbo fire extinguisher she bought floods the store, Curtis decides to move in with Ted and Margo as well.
2	"Lucy Makes a Hit with John Ritter"	Peter Baldwin	Bob Carroll Jr. & Madelyn Davis	September 27, 1986	104
John Ritter stops by the hardware store to buy some door-handles for the set of his new play. But when Lucy inadvertently injures his hands and foot, she insists that he stay at the house so she can nurse him back. And when his co-star and leading lady drops out of the play, Lucy rushes to his aid by joining the cast.
3	"Love Among the Two-by-Fours"	Marc Daniels	Linda Morris & Vic Rauseo	October 4, 1986	106
Curtis competes for the store to be a vendor for a new construction site, only to find out the company's head Ben Matthews (Peter Graves) is an old flame of Lucy. Lucy accepts a date from him, with Curtis encouraging her to land the contract, and he asks her to accompany him back to San Francisco. However, Lucy is torn as she wants to break things off, still mourning her late husband, while remaining friends and business partners.
4	"Lucy Gets Her Wires Crossed"	Peter Baldwin	Linda Morris & Vic Rauseo	October 18, 1986	103
When a popular talk-show host (Dick Gautier) comes to the Hardware store, Lucy talks him into inviting Curtis on the show for a "Mr. Fix-It" segment. Becky urges Curtis to allow Lucy on the segment as well, which turns disastrous as she ends up gluing herself to Curtis during a demonstration.
5	"Lucy Is a Sax Symbol"	Peter Baldwin	Arthur Marx & Robert Fisher	October 25, 1986	105
While cleaning out the basement, Lucy finds her old saxophone and encourages Becky to take up playing it. As the family quickly becomes annoyed by the saxophone – particularly Curtis – Becky finds the instrument unsatisfying. However, she cannot bring herself to tell a prideful Lucy, afraid of hurting her feelings.
6	"Lucy Make Curtis Byte the Dust"	Marc Daniels	Arthur Marx & Robert Fisher	November 1, 1986	108
Lucy and Curtis buy a computer to help organize the books at the shop. When she uses it to order some un-returnable merchandise, Lucy tries to get to the bank to stop the check from arriving at the bank — and accidentally informs them that Curtis had died.
7	"Lucy, Legal Beagle"	Marc Daniels	Richard Albrecht & Casey Keller	November 8, 1986	110
While trying to pass off her grandson Kevin's teddy bear as her own during a clean-up sale (to avoid Kevin from being taunted by friends), Lucy sticks it in a bag. The bag is then purchased with the teddy bear in it, so Lucy starts putting reward posters around town. When a woman (Dena Dietrich) finally comes back for the reward, she begins to ask for a lot more than the $50 that Lucille is offering.
8	"Mother of the Bride"	Bruce Bilson	Linda Morris & Vic Rauseo	November 15, 1986	112
Still upset that Margo and Ted eloped instead of having a ceremony (mainly due to Lucy's extravagant plans), Lucy and the kids convince the couple to renew their vows for their upcoming tenth anniversary. Lucy's sister Audrey (Audrey Meadows) is also stranded in town when her job on a cruise ship is temporarily delayed. Lucy's excitement about the two events is soon diminished when Audrey begins to make all the wedding arrangements, which results in a cake fight between the sisters.
9	"Lucy and the Guard Goose"	Peter Baldwin	Bob Carroll Jr. & Madelyn Davis	Unaired	102
Lucy inadvertently causes the hardware shop to be robbed when she foolishly leaves the key in plain sight. Looking to make up her mistake, she gets a goose to act as a guard for the store. But the goose never gets a chance to scare the thieves because it is too busy scaring the owners.
10	"Lucy and Curtis Up a Tree"	Marc Daniels	Bob Carroll Jr. & Madelyn Davis	Unaired	107
Margo and Ted are very worried that Curtis and Lucy are spoiling their children. This situation isn't helped out when Curtis decides to build Kevin a tree house, which causes a fight between the couple. While working on the treehouse, Lucy and Curtis decide to relieve Ted and Margo's burden by arguing over who will move out. But Kevin walks off the ladder, leaving the two of them trapped.
11	"Lucy's Green Thumb"	Marc Daniels	Mark Tuttle	Unaired	109
Lucy makes her infamous health shakes for the family, and they show their appreciation by pouring them into an ailing plant. When the plant shoots up overnight, Curtis thinks he has a million-dollar plant growing supplement. But Lucy can't remember what she put into it.
12	"Breaking Up Is Hard to Do"	Peter Baldwin	S : Laura Levine; T : Richard Albrecht & Casey Keller	Unaired	111
Inspired by a friend's retirement stories, Curtis sells Lucy his share of the shop so he can also experience the joys of retirement. As Lucy goes all-out for a solo-ownership celebration, Curtis experiences some regret as he finds retirement to be boring. But as Lucy's antics nearly bankrupt the store, she interviews candidates to take over Curtis's position – finally settling on him retaking his portion of the store back.
13	"World's Greatest Grandma"	Bruce Bilson	S : Mel Sherer & Steve Granat; T : Bob Carroll Jr. & Madelyn Davis	Unaired	113
Lucy is jealous that everyone else in the family has a trophy to boast about. Becky encourages Lucy to join a talent show and win the trophy as the grand prize. After trying singing, dancing, telling jokes, and doing magic, Lucy settles on reciting a song. But when she loses, the grandkids give her a trophy for being the "World's Greatest Grandma".
14	"Twas the Flight Before Christmas"	N/A	Linda Morris & Vic Rauseo	Unproduced	114
The family goes to a friend's cabin in Colorado, but become stranded on the plane in Denver and discover that Christmas is more than presents, but about spending time with your family. This episode was never produced, but a first draft of the script exists.

== Production ==
During the 1984–1985 television season, NBC had experienced a huge success with its Bill Cosby comeback vehicle The Cosby Show, following it up the next year with The Golden Girls, which likewise revitalized the careers of Bea Arthur and Betty White. ABC, looking to stage a similar resurgence for an older sitcom star and to boost Saturday night ratings, approached 75-year-old, five-time Emmy award winner and cultural icon Lucille Ball. Producer Aaron Spelling had been in talks with Ball and her second husband Gary Morton since 1979 about possibly doing another series; the popular success of her dramatic turn in the television film Stone Pillow had proved she was still popular with audiences. Ball was initially hesitant about returning to television, stating that she did not believe she could top the 25-year run of success she had had with I Love Lucy, The Lucy Show and Here's Lucy. Her longtime co-star Vivian Vance had died in 1979, and Gale Gordon was retired in Palm Springs. However, Ball eventually agreed, conceding she had missed having a regular project to work on daily.

Ball's only conditions working on the series were that she be reunited with Gordon, and longtime writers Bob Carroll Jr. and Madelyn Pugh. Although ABC had offered Ball the writers from the critical and ratings hit M*A*S*H, and she was open to other writers on the series, Ball was insistent that Carroll and Pugh supervise the writing. Both had worked for Ball since her 1948 radio show My Favorite Husband, and had been writers on all of her television series, plus several of her specials; more recently, they had worked on Alice. Gordon was coaxed out of retirement with the promise of a full season's pay for all 22 episodes, regardless of whether the show was picked up for such. According to cast and crew members, the then 80-year-old Gordon never once flubbed a line on the set during the 13-episode duration. Ball also called in crew members who had worked for her since the days of I Love Lucy. The most notable was sound man Cam McCulloch, who joined the crew during I Love Lucy’s third season in 1954. However, by 1986, McCulloch was 77 years old and quite hard of hearing, requiring the use of two hearing aids; he was still working actively in Hollywood at the time, mixing audio for WKRP in Cincinnati, Square Pegs and select episodes of Newhart. Ball was reportedly paid $100,000 an episode. Ball’s husband Gary Morton, carrying the title of executive producer, negotiated for $150,000 per episode.

The series was initially developed by Carroll and Pugh to resemble The Golden Girls, and Ball had offered to do something different from her previous projects. However, ABC wanted the series in the vein of Ball's previous series. According to a former assistant of Morton, "there was a lot of politicking going on between the Life with Lucy staff, the Spelling staff, and ABC."

Ball's character's surname, Barker, continued her tradition of using surnames containing the letters "ar" (as in Ricardo, Carmichael and Carter on Ball's previous sitcoms) in tribute to her ex-husband Desi Arnaz.

The show's theme song was performed by Eydie Gormé. An alternative theme was written by Ball's daughter, Lucie Arnaz with Cy Coleman, but was not used.

=== Cancellation ===
Fourteen episodes were written, thirteen filmed, but only eight aired. "Mother of the Bride", the last to air, was the twelfth episode filmed and featured Audrey Meadows as Lucy's sister. Meadows was offered to be cast as a regular to give the show a new direction and Ball's character a comic foil and partner, like that of Vivian Vance in Ball's previous series. (Life With Lucy was the only sitcom of Ball's in which Vance, who had died in 1979, never appeared). Ball and Meadows did not get along on the set, though, and Meadows turned down the offer. On November 17, the day of the taping the final episode, ABC informed Spelling and Morton that they were not ordering a full season, thus cancelling the series. Morton decided not to reveal the news to Ball until after the taping had ended.

As only 13 episodes were produced, it was not possible for the series to go into heavy rerun rotation like I Love Lucy. It did still air on Nick at Nite as part of a Lucille Ball-themed marathon in 1996. Episodes can also be found at the Paley Center for Media.

Ball was devastated by the failure of the show, and she never again attempted another series or feature film; her subsequent interviews and other TV appearances became infrequent. Her last public appearance was as a presenter at the 1989 Academy Awards, where she and fellow presenter Bob Hope were given a standing ovation. She died a month later, in April 1989. In a 1999 interview with the Archive of American Television, Aaron Spelling attributed the failure of the show to his decision to allow Ball to do the same type of shows she had done in the past. Spelling said that at her age, the audience were more worried for her safety than laughing at her pratfalls. Spelling said this experience had a lot to do with his rarely producing sitcoms.

In July 2002, TV Guide named Life with Lucy the 26th worst TV series of all time, stating that it was "without a doubt, the saddest entry in [its] list of bad TV shows". In his book What Were They Thinking? The 100 Dumbest Events in Television History, author David Hofstede ranked the series at No. 21 on the list.

=== Ratings ===
Life with Lucy's premiere episode on September 20 made the Nielsen's Top 25 (#23 for the week) for its week; however, subsequent episodes dropped steadily in viewership; Life with Lucy went against NBC's The Facts of Life in the same Saturday night lead off timeslot and never gained ground against it. It ranked only 73rd out of 79 shows for the season (the seventh lowest rated show on TV for the season), with a 9.0/16 rating/share.

Ratings
Episode	Title	Original air date	Rating/Share	Rank
1	"One Good Grandparent Deserves Another"	September 20, 1986	14.6/28	23
2	"Lucy Makes a Hit with John Ritter"	September 27, 1986	10.1/20	57
3	"Lucy Among the Two-by-Fours"	October 4, 1986	10.2/19	66
4	"Lucy Gets Her Wires Crossed"	October 18, 1986	11.5/20	53
5	"Lucy Is a Sax Symbol"	October 25, 1986	8.7/15	62
6	"Lucy Make Curtis Byte the Dust"	November 1, 1986	8.0/14	71
7	"Lucy, Leagle Beagle"	November 8, 1986	8.1/14	71
8	"Mother of the Bride"	November 15, 1986	6.6/12	68

== Home media ==
In September 2018, Time Life released a DVD, Lucy: The Ultimate Collection, that included 4 episodes of Life with Lucy (which had never before been released to home media), as well as 32 episodes of I Love Lucy, two episodes of The Lucy–Desi Comedy Hour, 24 episodes of The Lucy Show, and 14 episodes of Here's Lucy, plus a wide variety of bonus features.

On July 26, 2019, CBS/Paramount announced the release of all thirteen episodes on a separate Life with Lucy - The Complete Series DVD set, including the final five episodes that were produced but never aired. The set was released on October 8, 2019.

In Australia, Life With Lucy - The Complete Series was released on April 1, 2020 and distributed by Shock Entertainment.

Title	Format	Ep #	Discs	Region 1 (USA)	Region 2 (UK)	Region 4 (Australia)	Special features	Distributors
Life with Lucy: The Complete Series	DVD	13	2	8 October 2019	N/A	1 April 2020	Hour Magazine segments (5:00, 5:07, 4:59): host Gary Collins interviews Lucille Ball (and Gale Gordon in the first of three segments) in which she extols her co-star as vital to her return to television. She acknowledges the poor reviews the show had received, but she has confidence that her loyal audience will continue with the show. ABC promos (0:30): four vintage spot ads for selected episodes in montage. Entertainment Tonight segments (4:12): two brief interviews in montage with Lucy before the show’s premiere.	CBS/Paramount
