= Temporarily Yours =

- Created by: Michael Patrick King
- Starring: Debi Mazar; Joanna Gleason; Seth Green; Saverio Guerra; Nancy Cassaro
- Composer: Roger Boyce
- Country of origin: United States
- Original language: English
- No. of seasons: 1
- No. of episodes: 6

Production
- Running time: 30 minutes
- Production companies: Garden State Productions; 20th Century Fox Television

Original release
- Network: CBS
- Release: March 5 – April 9, 1997

Temporarily Yours is an American sitcom that aired on CBS for six episodes in 1997.

== Plot ==
Deb DeAngelo (Debi Mazar), a young woman is desperate for a luxurious, cheaply priced New York City apartment. She lies to the landlady about having a job with a temp agency and then hurries to the agency to beg for work before the landlady calls and discovers the lie. The agency is run by Joan (Joanna Gleason), an uptight businesswoman. Joan reluctantly takes on Deb as an employee but sends her out on strange assignments.

In the pilot episode, she is sent to work as a makeup artist at a mortuary. The following episodes generally revolved around Deb's various temporary assignments and how they affected her personal life.

== Cast ==
- Debi Mazar as Deb DeAngelo
- Joanna Gleason as Joan Silver
- Seth Green as David Silver
- Saverio Guerra as Caesar Santos
- Nancy Cassaro as Anne Marie

== Reception ==
The series was heavily derided by critics and had low viewership and was canceled after six episodes. In Entertainment Weekly, Bruce Fretts wrote:

The cast renders this limp material watchable. Mazar’s outer-borough chumminess contrasts well with Gleason’s WASPy chilliness. While it’s no gem, the show fits better with The Nanny than did Rhea Perlman’s tarnished Pearl. But if Mazar wants more than a temporary presence on CBS, she might want to call in a few temps herself — to replace the show’s writers.

== Episodes ==
No.	Title	Directed by	Written by	Original release date	Prod. code
1	"Pilot"	James Widdoes	Story by : Michael Patrick King; Teleplay by : Michael Patrick King and Vic Rauseo & Linda Morris	March 5, 1997	4T01
2	"Temp-tation"	Ellen Gittelsohn	Mark Solomon	March 12, 1997	4T02
3	"The Voice of Reason"	Arlene Sanford	Michael Feldman & Douglas Lieblein	March 19, 1997	4T05
4	"Independence Day"	Brian K. Roberts	Susan Beavers	March 26, 1997	4T06
5	"In the Same Boat"	Ellen Gittelsohn	Susan Beavers	April 2, 1997	4T03
6	"By Design"	Philip Charles MacKenzie	Wendy Goldman	April 9, 1997	4T04
