= Moscow Bureau =

- Genre: Comedy
- Written by: David Lloyd
- Directed by: John Rich

Moscow Bureau is a half-hour ABC television comedy made in 1985 as a pilot for a proposed series. Written by Emmy Award winner David Lloyd and directed by John Rich, the show aired in the summer of the following year as an episode of "ABC Comedy Specials", listed in some markets as "Comedy Factory".

Moscow Bureau takes place in what was still Cold War-era Moscow, focusing on the hard-drinking editor at a weekly U.S. newsmagazine and his staff of reporters who "skulk, double-deal, scoop each other, and take other alarming measures to get their stories out to the world."

Cast: Caroline McWilliams (Christine Nichols), William Windom (Herb Medlock), Elya Baskin (Sasha Zhukov), Barrie Ingham (Nigel Blake), Nancy Lane (Connie Uecker), Dennis Drake (Tim Carmichael), Michael Zaslow (Phil), James Newell (1st Reporter), Charles Knox Robinson (2nd Reporter)
