= David Lloyd (writer) =

American screenwriter and producer (1934–2009)

- Born: David Gibbs Lloyd; July 7, 1934; Bronxville, New York, U.S.
- Died: November 10, 2009 (aged 75); Beverly Hills, California, U.S.
- Occupations: Screenwriter, producer
- Spouse: Arline Lloyd
- Children: 5, including Christopher
- Relatives: Arleen Sorkin (daughter-in-law)

David Gibbs Lloyd (July 7, 1934 – November 10, 2009) was an American screenwriter and producer for television.

He wrote for many sitcoms, such as The Mary Tyler Moore Show, The Bob Newhart Show, Taxi, Cheers, Frasier and Wings. Lloyd wrote "Chuckles Bites the Dust", an October 1975 episode of the Mary Tyler Moore Show, for which he won the Emmy Award for Outstanding Writing in a Comedy Series.

== Family ==
Lloyd was married to Arline Mary Walsh Lloyd. The couple had five children, television writers Stephen and Christopher, as well as Julie, Amy, and Douglas.

== Death ==
He died on November 10, 2009, aged 75, from prostate cancer at his home in Beverly Hills, California.

The November 18, 2009, episode of Modern Family (which was co-created by his son Christopher), "Great Expectations", on ABC ended with an "In Memory" screen dedicating the episode to David's life.

== Filmography ==
- The Tonight Show Starring Johnny Carson (1963–1970)
- The Dick Cavett Show (1970–1973)
- Jack Paar Tonite (1973)
- Bob & Carol & Ted & Alice (1973) (TV)
- The Mary Tyler Moore Show (1973–1977)
- Doc (1975)
- Phyllis (1975–1977)
- The Tony Randall Show (1976)
- The Bob Newhart Show (1976–1977)
- The Betty White Show (1976–1977)
- Lou Grant (1977–1982)
- Rhoda (1978)
- The Associates (1979–1980)
- Taxi (1979–1983)
- Number 96 (1980)
- Best of the West (1982)
- Cheers (1982–1993)
- Mr. Smith (1982)
- At Your Service (1984)
- Brothers (1984–1989)
- Moscow Bureau (1985)
- Mr. Sunshine (1986)
- Amen (1986)
- Mr. President (1987)
- Dear John (1988)
- Wings (1990–1995)
- Frasier (1994–2001)
