= Vic Rauseo =

American television producer and writer

- Occupations: Television producer and writer
- Years active: 1976–1997
- Spouse(s): Linda Morris (?–present)

Vic Rauseo is an American television producer and writer. He is best known for his work on the television series Frasier, for which he received three Primetime Emmy Awards in 1994, 1995 and 1996 as a part of the producing and writing team.

Rauseo began his professional career as stage manager on the game show, Family Feud in 1976. As a television producer and writer his credits include Welcome Back, Kotter, Alice, Life With Lucy, Doogie Howser, M.D. and Temporarily Yours, his last television credit. All of the aforementioned work was with his wife, fellow television producer and writer Linda Morris.

Rauseo is an alum of Kean University.
