= Linda Morris =

American television producer and writer

- Born: November 28, 1947
- Died: February 18, 2019
- Occupations: Television producer and writer
- Years active: 1978–1997
- Spouse(s): Vic Rauseo (?–present)

Linda Morris was an American television producer and writer. She was best known for her work on the television series Frasier, for which she received three Primetime Emmy Awards in 1994, 1995 and 1996 as a part of the producing and writing team.

Morris' other television credits include Welcome Back, Kotter, Alice, Life With Lucy, Doogie Howser, M.D. and Temporarily Yours, her last television credit. All of the aforementioned work was with her husband, fellow television producer and writer Vic Rauseo.

Morris is an alumna of Kean University.
