= Stage 32 =

Social networking platform for creative professionals in entertainment industry

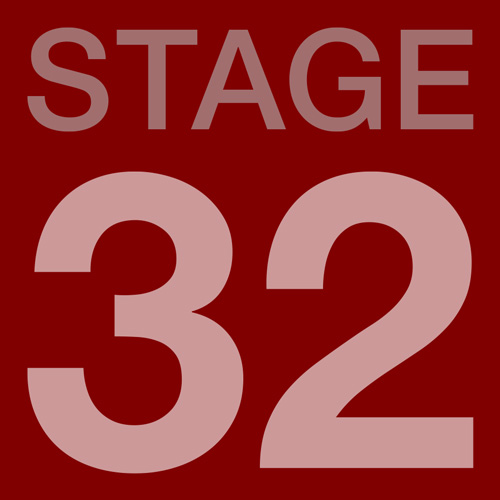
- Company type: Private
- Website type: Social networking service
- Available in: English
- Founded: Scottsdale, Arizona (2011)
- Headquarters: Los Angeles, US
- Founder: Richard Botto
- Key people: Richard Botto (CEO)
- Industry: Entertainment, internet
- Website: stage32.com
- Registration: Required
- Users: 1,500,000 (March 2025)
- Launched: February 1, 2012
- Current status: Active

Stage 32 is a U.S.-based social network and educational site for creative professionals who work in film, television and theater. As of August 2021, the global web site had more than 1,500,000 members.

Stage 32 links professionals in the entertainment industry including directors, writers, actors and entertainment staff. It caters to film industry professionals with featured bloggers, online education taught by industry executives, news from Hollywood and filming locations around the world, Stage 32 meetups page, an online lounge and a jobs page that allows members to connect with others on film ventures, along with standard social media functions.

== History ==
CEO and founder, Richard Botto, an Orson Welles fan, drew his inspiration for the name "Stage 32" from the old RKO Soundstage 17 where Citizen Kane was filmed. That sound stage is now Paramount's Stage 32. Botto states that he created Stage 32 in order to connect, to educate, and to increase the odds of success for creative professionals in the film and television industries, regardless of their geographical location. The user community has foreign members but as of 2013, the website is available only in English.

By April 2012, Stage 32 reached 50,000 members, only three months after the official launch.

By January 29, 2013, the company released their app through iTunes for iPhone and Google Play for Android. By August 2013 the site reached 150,000 members as they announced their 2nd phase of development, which included Creativefest and Next Level Webinars.

In April 2014, Stage 32 acquired The Happy Writers, forming The Stage 32 Happy Writers. By May 2014, the web site had more than 325,000 members and announced a partnership with The Blood List, Search for New Blood Screenwriting Contest with the top 3 screenplays being featured on The Blood List "New Blood" section and the winner being flown to LA to have a meeting with Richard Potter, executive Vice President of Relativity Media. The winner of the New Blood Screenwriting Contest, Glenn Forbes, was signed by Infinity Management Group and the 2nd-place winner, Frank Ponce, signed an agreement with Atlas Entertainment.

In July 2014, Forbes called Stage 32 "Lynda.com Meets LinkedIn For Film, Television And Theater Creatives."

In April 2015, Stage 32 and Producers Guild of America Women's Impact Network launched an education and pitching event looking for female-centric scripts. In June 2015 Stage 32 was featured in the NEXT Pavilion at the Cannes Film Festival Marche du Film as a leader in the convergence of entertainment and tech. Stage 32 Founder & CEO, Richard Botto spoke on a panel about social media and crowdsourcing for filmmakers which was attended by over 200 Stage 32 members from 20 countries including Australia, Belgium, England, France, Germany, Finland, Netherlands, India, Italy, United States of America, Malaysia, Monaco, Romania, Spain, Switzerland, South Africa, Argentina and Brazil.

In December 2021, Netflix and Stage 32 announced that they have teamed up the workshops at the Creating Content for the Global Marketplace program.

=== Global reach ===
While still English-based, Stage 32 projects have found success making international connections. Redondo Beach, California based writer and director Mark Jacobs (Kitchen Nightmares, The Glee Project), used Stage 32 to hire UK-based composer Massimo Restaino Max to score his film, Mission Angels. Stage 32 Happy Writers online pitchfests have resulted in Lyse Beck, a visual graphics artist from New Zealand (The Lord of the Rings trilogy, Avatar, Iron Man 3 and Man of Steel) getting a script into development with Night and Day Pictures, and Guy McDouall from Wellington Australia being signed with literary manager Lee Stobby at Silent R Management.

In February 2015, Craig Walendziak landing a writing assignment through Stage 32 Happy Writers online pitching sessions to co-write A Dying Art with Matthew McCarty for producer David Harris, and director David Moscow (Big). In June 2015, nineteen Stage 32 members had films screen at the Cannes Film Festival, including Monaco producer Michel Merkt, who screened four of his films at the Marche, from Director's Fortnight opener In The Shadow of Women directed by Philippe Garrel to Miguel Gomes's three-film triptych Arabian Nights. London-based Stage 32 member Saranne Bensusan, a director, producer, editor and animator, screened her first solo-directed stop-animation feature film The Hunting of the Snark. And Stage 32 members Joe Orlandino, an American producer, Italian producer/director Davide Cincis, Canadian composer Enzo De Rosa, American actor Danny McCarthy and Italian actor Vincent Papa, came to Cannes to screen short film In My Brother's Shoes in the Shorts Corner, before showing it at the Vatican.

== Features and products ==
The Stage 32 site supports a "jobs" section for sharing posts on open positions in film, television or theater; a "Next Level Education" section which hosts webinars; online classes and labs; an online lounge to discuss the business and craft; a Stage 32 meetups section to organize offline gatherings; and a "Stage 32 Happy Writers" section for screenwriting services, including one-on-one online pitch sessions with production companies, development executives and managers.

The Stage 32 Blog is an editorial section where contributors range from film students to Academy Award nominees. Some notable blog contributors and members include Terence Stamp (Academy Award-nominated actor); Danny Rubin (BAFTA Film award-winning screenwriter, Groundhog Day); Alysia Reiner (actress, Orange Is the New Black); and Doug Richardson (screenwriter, Hostage, Bad Boys)., and Oscar Winner Thomas Curley (Whiplash).

== Notable Films via Stage 32 ==
- Neighborhood Watch, writer Sean Farley met producer Chris Bellant during a Feature Read + 30 Minute consultation call about this script.
- No Address, writer James Papa met co-writer, director, and producer Julia Verdin via Stage 32.
- Baghead, writer Christina Pamies won the Search for New Blood contest and was set up on a meeting with Literary Manager Jake Wagner, who signed her then secured Christina a Writing Assignment for this script later that year.
- The Inhabitant, writer Kevin Bachar won the Search for New Blood contest with this script.
- Chick Fight, writer Joseph Downey pitched this script to Tiffany Boyle, producer & president of packaging and sales for Ramo Law, who then worked with 6 executives in the Stage 32 community to bring this film to life.
- Crushed, writer Heidi Lux met Literary Manager Audrex Knox of The Cartel during a Feature Read + 60 Minute consultation call about this script, which was produced in 2022 by The Cartel's production arm, Cartel Pictures, and distributed by Tubi.
