= Jonathan Marc Sherman =

American dramatist

- Sherman in 2026
- Born: October 10, 1968 (age 58); United States
- Education: Bennington College
- Occupations: Playwright, poet, actor, screenwriter, film producer
- Spouse: Alexandra Shiva
- Children: 2

Jonathan Marc Sherman (born October 10, 1968) is an American playwright, poet, actor, screenwriter and film producer. He submitted plays for several years to Young Playwrights Inc.'s National Playwrights Competition before they did a staged reading of his one-act, Serendipity and Serenity in 1987, followed by a full production of his next play, Women and Wallace (1988).

Sherman was one of the founders of Malaparte theater company.

== Early life ==
Sherman attended Stagedoor Manor, a summer camp for the performing arts. He attended Bennington College.

== Plays ==
=== Serendipity and Serenity ===
1987. Young Playwrights Festival at Playwrights Horizons (staged reading)

=== Women and Wallace ===
- 1988. Foundation of the Dramatists Guild (now Young Playwrights Inc.) Young Playwrights Festival at Playwrights Horizons. Josh Hamilton as Wallace.
- 1990. American Playhouse (PBS television), with Josh Hamilton (Wallace), Joan Copeland, Shaie Dively, Erica Gimpel, Joanna Going, Mary Joy, Debra Monk, Cynthia Nixon, and Jill Tasker. Directed by Don Scardino.

=== Jesus on the Oil Tank ===
Winner of the 21st Century Playwrights Award

=== Sons and Fathers ===
The short play is about a family of two brothers, Toby and Max, and their father, fifteen years after the mother committed suicide.

The play was written in 1991, and was performed by the Malaparte Theater Company in New York City. Calista Flockhart played Joanna, Josh Hamilton played Toby and Ethan Hawke played Max. In the play's earlier incarnation as a workshop reading, Sherman himself played the part of Toby.

=== Veins and Thumbtacks ===
- 1991. Los Angeles Theatre Center. Jimmy Bonaparte: Fisher Stevens
- 1994. Malaparte in New York City. Jimmy Bonaparte: Frank Whaley
- 2001. Basis for Frank Whaley's movie The Jimmy Show, with Frank Whaley, Carla Gugino, Ethan Hawke, and Lynn Cohen.

=== Sophistry ===
- 1993. Playwrights Horizons. With Linda Atkinson, Nadia Dajani, Ethan Hawke, Katherine Hiler, Scarlett Johansson, Dick Latessa, Anthony Rapp, Jonathan Marc Sherman, and Steve Zahn.

=== Wonderful Time ===
1995. WPA Theater in New York City.

=== Evolution ===
- 1998. Williamstown Theatre Festival in Massachusetts. Directed by Nicholas Martin. With Matt McGrath (actor) (Henry), Dylan Baker (Storyteller), Anna Belknap (Gina), Marin Hinkle (Hope), Justin Kirk (Ernie), and Sam Breslin Wright (Rex). Sets by Alexander Dodge, Lights by Stephen Brady, Costumes by Marisa Timperman, Sound by Jerry N. Yager
- 2002. 45 Below at Culture Project in New York City. Directed by Elizabeth Gottlieb. With Josh Hamilton (Henry), Larry Block (Storyteller), Peter Dinklage (Rex), Keira Naughton (Hope), Armando Riesco (Ernie), and Ione Skye (Gina). Sets by Andromache Chalfant, Lights by Jeff Croiter, Costumes by Daphne Javitch, Video by Edmond Deraedt

=== Things We Want ===
- 2007. The New Group in New York City. Directed by Ethan Hawke. With Paul Dano (Charlie), Peter Dinklage (Sty), Josh Hamilton (Teddy), and Zoe Kazan (Stella). Sets by Derek McLane, lights by Jeff Croiter, costumes by Mattie Ulrich, sound by Daniel Baker.
- 2012. Oyun Alani in Istanbul. Directed by Cevdet Canver. With Kutay Kunt (Charlie), Caner Erdem (Sty), Mehmet Okuroglu (Teddy), and Aybike Turan (Stella).
- 2015 (Coming in October). Columbia University in New York City. Directed by Eric Wimer. With William Sydney (Charlie), Maeve Duffy (Sty), Joseph Santia (Teddy), and Lizzy Harding (Stella).
- 2018 in Manchester UK; Hope Mill Theatre; Directed by Daniel Bradford. With Alex Phelps (Teddy), William J Holstead (Sty), Paddy Young (Charlie), Hannah Ellis Ryan (Stella).

=== Knickerbocker ===
- 2009. Williamstown Theatre Festival in Massachusetts. Directed by Nicholas Martin. With Brooks Ashmanskas (Melvin), Peter Dinklage (Chester), Bob Dishy (Raymond), Rightor Doyle (Steve), Annie Parisse (Tara), Susan Pourfar (Pauline), and Reg Rogers (Jerry). Sets by Alexander Dodge. Sound Design by Alex Neumann.
- 2011. The Public Theater in New York City. Directed by Pippin Parker. With Mia Barron (Pauline), Alexander Chaplin (Jerry), Bob Dishy (Raymond), Christina Kirk (Tara), Drew Madland (Steve), Zak Orth (Chester), and Ben Shenkman (Melvin). Sets by Peter Ksander, Costumes by Gabriel Berry, Lights by Jeff Croiter, Sound by Walter Trarbach, Projection Design by Shawn Duan.

=== Clive ===
2013. The New Group in New York City. Directed by Ethan Hawke. With Brooks Ashmanskas, Vincent D'Onofrio, Ethan Hawke, Stephanie Janssen, Mahira Kakkar, Zoe Kazan, Aaron Krohn, Dana Lyn, and Jonathan Marc Sherman. Sets by Derek McLane, lights by Jeff Croiter, costumes by Catherine Zuber, sound by Shane Rettig.

=== Bob & Carol & Ted & Alice ===
2020. The New Group in New York City. Book by Jonathan Marc Sherman, music by Duncan Sheik, lyrics by Sheik and Amanda Green, musical staging by Kelly Devine. Directed by Scott Elliott. With Jennifer Damiano, Jamie Mohamdein, Ana Nogueira, Joel Perez, Suzanne Vega, and Michael Zegen. Sets by Derek McLane, lights by Jeff Croiter, costumes by Jeff Mahshie, sound by Jessica Paz. Music direction by Jason Hart. Based on the Columbia Pictures motion picture, Bob & Carol & Ted & Alice, directed by Paul Mazursky and written by Mazursky and Larry Tucker.

=== The Connector ===
Sherman wrote the book for an original musical with music and lyrics by Jason Robert Brown.

== Acting ==
=== Theater ===
- Oliver! (as "The Artful Dodger") Pittsburgh Civic Light Opera, 1983
- My First Swedish Bombshell (TV) (Harrison Slide) NBC & Showtime, 1985
- The Chopin Playoffs (as "Irving Yanover") American Jewish Theatre, 1986
- A Joke (as "Grizzoffi"), Malaparte, 1992
- Sophistry (as "Igor"), Playwrights Horizons, 1993
- Wild Dogs, Malaparte, 1993
- Unexpected Tenderness (as "Roddy Stern"), WPA, 1994
- The Great Unwashed, Malaparte, 1994
- Pigeonholed (as Bartender), 1999
- I Wanna Be Adored, NY Performance Works, 2000
- Zog's Place (as himself), 2001
- Broadway: The American Musical (TV), 2004
- The Baxter (as "Deaf Bar Baxter"), 2005
- Escape Artists (as "Linus"), 2005
- The Limbo Room (as "Guy Greenbaum"), 2006
- Steam (as "Norman"), 2006
- When The Nines Roll Over (as "the Australian"), 2006
- Up For Anything (as "Walter Dabney"), The Kraine Theater, 2009
- Ivanov (as "Dr. Lvov"), Classic Stage Company, 2012

=== Film ===
- Quiz Show (as Don Quixote Student #2), 1994
- Southie (as "Eddie Eaton"), 1998
- The Hottest State (as "Party Philosopher"), 2007
- Blaze (as "Sam"), 2018
- Tick, Tick... Boom! (as Ira Weitzman), 2021

== Personal life ==
Sherman is married to Alexandra Shiva. They have two children.
