= Missy O'Reilly =

American actress and comedian

- Occupations: Actress; Comedienne; Karaoke bar co-owner
- Notable credit: Boiling Points

Missy O'Reilly is an actress/comedian best known as a cast member on MTV's hidden camera show Boiling Points. She has also appeared as various characters on Late Night with Conan O'Brien and as a part of the Upright Citizens Brigade, as well appearing in the film Martin & Orloff and New York City Serenade. She is currently a series regular on CMT's Prankville.

She co-wrote and performed Secret Slut with Matt Walsh at the 2003 U.S. Comedy Arts Festival.

She has been co-owner of a New York City karaoke lounge called "Planet Rose" since 2007.

== Television Work ==
- Primetime:What Would You Do - Manager/Atheist/Waitress/Girl on crutches/Bbq boss (2015)
- The Residuals TV series - Colleen (2014)
- Brain Games TV series - Falling girl (2014)
- Prankville TV Series - Series regular (2007-)
- Boiling Points TV Series - Series regular (2003–2007)
- Late Night with Conan O'Brien - Various characters (2002-)
- Upright Citizens Brigade - Various characters (1998–1999)

== Filmography ==
- New York City Serenade (2007) (post-production) - Girl 2
- Martin & Orloff (2002) (as Marie O'Reilly) - M. Force Secretary
