= Death on the Border =

- Directed by: Wendy Wilkins
- Screenplay by: Wendy Wilkins
- Produced by: Wendy Wilkins; Errol Sack; Julia Verdin
- Starring: Shannon Elizabeth; Eric Roberts; Frank Whaley; Danny Trejo
- Production company: Alone Today Film. LLC
- Distributed by: VMI Worldwide
- Release date: November 2023
- Running time: 95 minutes
- Country: United States
- Language: English

Death on the Border (alternate title: Alone Today) is a 2023 American mystery crime drama film written and directed by Wendy Wilkins and starring Shannon Elizabeth, Eric Roberts, Frank Whaley and Danny Trejo. It is based on Wilkins's own experiences as a former police officer. The film received generally negative reviews.

== Plot ==
Near the United States-Mexican border in Texas, Maddy runs a scam of feigning an automobile breakdown with a luxury convertible at the side of a highway to trick men into sexual activity to be apprehended by a Mexican cartel for their vehicle. One day, a truck driver becomes a victim and when Maddy opens the truck, she finds illegal migrants. She strikes up a relationship with state trooper Rhonda. The head of the cartel is run by Father Francis who goes under the guise of being a priest and is anticipating the return of his daughter, among the migrants of the truck that Rhonda has apprehended.

== Cast ==
- Danny Trejo as Father Francis
- Shannon Elizabeth as Maddy
- Frank Whaley as Detective John Watson
- Eric Roberts as Detective John Boone
- Kika Magalhães as Rhonda
- Iseluleko Ma'at El 0 as Manny
- Jay Hieron as Officer Brown
- Robin McDonald as Forensic Specialist
- Dutch Johnson as Sergeant Turner

== Production ==
In December 2021, it was announced that Trejo, Elizabeth and Whaley were cast in the film, which was formerly titled Alone Today. In March 2022, it was announced that Roberts was cast in the film and that production was underway in Los Angeles.

== Release ==
The film was released in theaters in November 2023.

== Reception ==
=== Critical response ===
Brian Orndorf of Blu-ray.com gave the film a negative review and wrote that it's "clumsy work, presenting a sloppy understanding of pain and faith, while the story itself is a jumble of names and places, often offered without essential organization." Maitland McDonagh of the Alliance of Women Film Journalists praised the cast and subject matter but described it as trapped in a betwixt and between place, one in which its disturbing subject matter is likely to put off some potential viewers while the seriousness of its approach will disappoint others, notable the ones looking for a more exploitative movie."
