= Malaparte (theater company) =

Theater company in New York City

- Formation: 1991
- Founders: Josh Hamilton; Ethan Hawke; Ami Armstrong; Robert Sean Leonard; James Waterston; Jonathan Marc Sherman; Frank Whaley; Steve Zahn; Cassandra Han
- Dissolved: 2000
- Type: Non-profit theatre company
- Legal status: Defunct
- Location: New York City, New York, United States

Malaparte was an American non-profit theater company based in New York City, New York.

== History ==
While driving cross-country in 1991, actors Josh Hamilton and Ethan Hawke and playwright Jonathan Marc Sherman decided to form a theater company. Actors Robert Sean Leonard, Frank Whaley, and Steve Zahn joined the fledgling enterprise, which Hawke named after an obscure novel. Leonard later explained, "We would be sitting around New York a lot, and we bowled a lot, and eventually we thought, 'When we're not doing anything, why don't we see if we can put some new plays on?'"

Malaparte's first production was a new translation of Luigi Pirandello's 1918 play A Joke starring Hamilton, Hawke, Sherman, Cynthia Nixon, and Austin Pendleton, which ran from October 9–31, 1992. The company operated for three seasons in the 1990s as the members juggled film and television work; there were often disputes over fundraising, casting, and play selection. Shows were performed in rented venues throughout Manhattan, with a flat $10 ticket price. In 1992, Jason Blum joined Malaparte as co-producing director with Ami Armstrong who had been running the office out of her home apartment. Blum personally hawked fliers in Times Square, shouting, "Don't go see some Broadway show! Come see a new play by an American playwright!" The New Yorker critic Hilton Als wrote that the Malaparte collective "brought a new take on male anxiety to the American theatre, and was not embarrassed by its love of women, or its romanticism."

Malaparte officially dissolved in 2000, in part because the members wanted to devote more time to their children. In 2005, Hawke referred to the company's heyday as "pretty much the most thrilling period of my life".

== Productions ==
| | Title | Author(s) | Director | Cast | Run | Venue |
|---|---|---|---|---|---|---|
| 1 | A Joke | Luigi Pirandello | Keith Bunin | Josh Hamilton, Ethan Hawke, Cynthia Nixon, Austin Pendleton, Jonathan Marc Sherman | October 9–31, 1992 | Sanford Meisner Theatre |
| 2 | Wild Dogs! | Daniel J. Rubin | Ethan Hawke | Amelia Campbell, Isabel Gillies, Jonathan Marc Sherman, Steve Zahn | December 3–19, 1993 | Theatre Row Theatre |
| 3 | Acoustic Night (coffeehouse) | | | Jesse Harris, Ethan Hawke, Robert Sean Leonard, Lisa Loeb, Frank Whaley | December 21, 1993 | Theatre Row Theatre |
| 4 | Good Evening | Dudley Moore and Peter Cook | James Waterston | Robert Sean Leonard, Frank Whaley | December 30–31, 1993; February 9–17, 1994 | Theatre Row Theatre; Wet Bank Cafe |
| 5 | It Changes Every Year and Sons and Fathers (one-acts) | Jon Robin Baitz and Jonathan Marc Sherman | Nicholas Martin | Brooks Ashmanskas, Calista Flockhart, Dana Ivey, Josh Hamilton, Ethan Hawke, Steve Zahn | January 7–22, 1994 | Theatre Row Theatre |
| 6 | Veins and Thumbtacks | Jonathan Marc Sherman | Ethan Hawke | Nicole Burdette, Lynn Cohen, Frank Whaley | October 7–23, 1994 | Theatre Row Theatre |
| 7 | Hesh | Matthew Weiss | Frank Pugliese | Nadia Dajani, Ned Eisenberg, Ethan Hawke, Frank Whaley | November 4–12, 1994 | Theatre Row Theatre |
| 8 | The Great Unwashed | Nicole Burdette | Max Mayer | Lynn Cohen, Ethan Hawke, Robert Sean Leonard, Martha Plimpton, Frank Whaley | November 18 – December 4, 1994 | Theatre Row Theatre |
