= List of Spin City episodes =

This is an episode list for the American sitcom television series Spin City. The series, which premiered on ABC on September 17, 1996, stars Michael J. Fox in the first four seasons, and Charlie Sheen in the last two seasons. The final episode aired on April 30, 2002. In total, 145 episodes were produced, spanning six seasons.

== Series overview ==
Season	Episodes	Originally released		Rank	Avg. rating (Note: In households; season 1 only)/ Avg. viewers (Note: In millions; seasons 2-6)
Season	Episodes	First released	Last released	Rank	Avg. rating/ Avg. viewers
1	24	September 17, 1996	May 13, 1997	17	11.7
2	24	September 24, 1997	May 20, 1998	47	12.0
3	26	September 22, 1998	May 25, 1999	28	13.1
4	26	September 21, 1999	May 24, 2000	33	12.4
5	23	October 18, 2000	May 23, 2001	53	10.8
6	22	September 25, 2001	April 30, 2002	78	8.4

== Episodes ==
=== Season 1 (1996–97) ===
No. overall	No. in season	Title	Directed by	Written by	Original release date	Prod. code	Viewers (millions)
1	1	"Prototype"	Thomas Schlamme	Gary David Goldberg & Bill Lawrence	September 17, 1996	101	25.88
Michael Flaherty (Michael J. Fox) and his City Hall team grapple with a garbage strike and a political gaffe when the Mayor accidentally insults gay people. Mike's girlfriend Ashley (Carla Gugino) questions Mike's commitment to their relationship when he is nervous about them moving in together.
2	2	"The Great Pretender"	Lee Shallat-Chemel	Sarah Dunn	September 24, 1996	103	20.78
Mike is named Sexiest Man in New York by Manhattan magazine and the staff must deal with Mayor Winston's problematic wife during an important dinner.
3	3	"The Apartment"	Lee Shallat-Chemel	Bill Lawrence	October 1, 1996	104	22.93
The continuing dilemma of the garbage strike keeps Mike and Ashley too busy to spend time together at their new apartment. Stuart makes a blunder when left in charge of the office.
4	4	"Pride and Prejudice"	Lee Shallat-Chemel	Brian Buckner & Sebastian Jones	October 8, 1996	102	23.70
During a television interview, Mike makes an insensitive joke about his working relationship with Ashley. Carter goes over Mike's head and encourages the Mayor to support a controversial policy on HIV. A reporter (Gretchen Mol) is attracted to James.
5	5	"The Rivals"	Lee Shallat-Chemel	Amy Cohen & Michelle Nader	October 15, 1996	105	20.05
The Mayor feels responsible for the death of his predecessor. Mike and Ashley try to avoid their new neighbors.
6	6	"A Star is Born"	Lee Shallat-Chemel	Kirk J. Rudell	October 22, 1996	106	18.0
The Mayor's low approval ratings sink even lower when the Winston Administration supports a nominee with a checkered past.
7	7	"Grand Illusion"	Lee Shallat-Chemel	Amy Cohen & Michelle Nader	October 29, 1996	107	22.15
Carter stages a mock wedding with Nikki, in protest of the Mayor's stance against same-sex marriage. Ashley is unhappy with the quality of her assignments at her new job.
8	8	"The High and the Mighty"	Lee Shallat-Chemel	Kirk J. Rudell	November 12, 1996	109	18.48
Mike asks a powerful land developer (George Wendt) for a favor. As the Winston Administration celebrates a reduction in crime rates, Paul gets mugged.
9	9	"Meet Tommy Dugan"	Lee Shallat-Chemel	Tim Hobert	November 19, 1996	110	17.5
A janitor at a local public school (Woody Harrelson) surprises the staff by winning the "New York City Mayor for a Day" contest. The Mayor tries to conform his image to the guidelines of a focus group. The second consecutive episode guest starring a Cheers alumnus.
10	10	"The Competition"	Lee Shallat-Chemel	Sarah Dunn	November 26, 1996	108	20.41
The Mayor's staff compete with the City Council as to who can serve the most homeless people on Thanksgiving. James tries to break up with his high school sweatheart (Jennifer Garner) who visits from Wisconsin. (Guest stars: Stephen Colbert as Frank, and former mayor Ed Koch as a city councilman.)
11	11	"Dog Day Afternoon"	Lee Shallat-Chemel	Jeff Lowell	December 10, 1996	111	15.91
Paul and Carter lose the body of a beloved police dog on its way to burial. Mike buys an air hockey table to help the staff relax.
12	12	"Criss Cross"	Lee Shallat-Chemel	Brian Buckner & Sebastian Jones	December 17, 1996	112	16.62
When the Mayor comes down with a cold, Mike must debate Ashley on a political talk show. Last appearance of Ashley.
13	13	"Bye Bye Love"	Lee Shallat-Chemel	Kirk J. Rudell & Bill Lawrence	January 7, 1997	113	18.91
Mike breaks up with Ashley. Paul sets a New Year's resolution to be less gullible.
14	14	"Starting Over"	Lee Shallat-Chemel	Jeff Lowell	January 14, 1997	114	18.11
Michael is uncomfortable being newly single with assistant DA Danielle Brinkman (Courtney Thorne-Smith). Paul meets the president of his fan club, Claudia Sacks (Faith Prince), who has arranged the "group's" first meeting. Carter and Stuart have a little too much to drink and end up in an uneasy situation. First appearance of Claudia.
15	15	"Gabby's Song"	Lee Shallat-Chemel	Jeff Lowell & Tim Hobert	January 28, 1997	115	19.63
Mike's attempts to woo a new member of the City Council (Constance Marie) are thwarted when she decides to play dirty. Claudia tries to seduce Paul.
16	16	"Kiss Me, Stupid"	Lee Shallat-Chemel	Sarah Dunn	February 11, 1997	117	15.45
Carter is reunited with his ex, Spence (Luke Perry), who is engaged to a woman. Mike goes on a disastrous first date with Nikki's friend Veronica (Kim Dickens).
17	17	"An Affair to Remember"	Lee Shallat-Chemel	Michelle Nader & Amy Cohen	February 18, 1997	116	15.56
As the Mayor's 50th birthday approaches, the media react to rumors he is having an affair. James edits the Mayor's birthday video, which features cameos by Rosie O'Donnell, Patrick Ewing, David Letterman, Larry King, the cast of Rent, and George Stephanopoulos; whom nobody believes that Paul is good friends with.
18	18	"Snowbound"	Lee Shallat-Chemel	Brian Buckner & Sebastian Jones	February 25, 1997	118	18.33
A massive blizzard hits New York. Mike is approached by a high school crush (Amanda Peet) for a one-night stand. Carter and Stuart get trapped in the boiler room. Paul lands in hot water over a remark about the Mayor.
19	19	"Striptease"	Lee Shallat-Chemel	Jeff Lowell & Tim Hobert	March 4, 1997	119	16.82
Mike dates a law student (Cynthia Watros) who happens to work part-time as a stripper. Nikki uses the advice of a guy she is dating to freak out Stuart.
20	20	"Deaf Becomes Her"	Lee Shallat-Chemel	Kirk J. Rudell & Sarah Dunn	March 18, 1997	120	16.46
When an office temp's attempt at sign language offends the deaf community, a leading advocate (Marlee Matlin) for deaf rights threatens to demonstrate at City Hall. Claudia moves in with Paul after he suffers a leg injury.
21	21	"Hot in the City"	Lee Shallat-Chemel	Jay Scherick & David Ronn	April 1, 1997	122	14.86
Mike's ex-girlfriend Carrie (Daphne Zuniga) desperately wants to bear his child, so she steals his sperm. A gaffe by the Mayor threatens to break up the reunion of a popular rock band.
22	22	"Bone Free"	Lee Shallat-Chemel	Story by : Michael Craven & Richard Childs; Teleplay by : Michelle Nader & Amy Cohen	April 29, 1997	121	14.78
Rumors about the Mayor's health abound, when he refuses to stand during a press conference. The guys don't approve of Nikki's freeloading screenwriter boyfriend.
23	23	"The Mayor Who Came to Dinner"	Lee Shallat-Chemel	Tim Hobert & Kirk J. Rudell	May 6, 1997	123	17.04
Mike must deal with a new roommate: The Mayor. Isaac Mizrahi helps the Mayor with a charity fashion show, and gives Nikki the chance of a lifetime.
24	24	"Mayor Over Miami"	Lee Shallat-Chemel	Story by : Sarah Dunn; Teleplay by : Brian Buckner & Sebastian Jones	May 13, 1997	124	15.52
The Mayor deals with his recent separation by taking Paul on a trip to Miami, leaving Mike to cover for him at City Hall. Stuart is strangely affected by his new girlfriend (Marin Hinkle).

=== Season 2 (1997–98) ===
No. overall	No. in season	Title	Directed by	Written by	Original release date	Prod. code	Viewers (millions)
25	1	"Paul Flew Over the Cuckoo's Nest"	Andy Cadiff	Bill Lawrence	September 24, 1997	201	12.35
Mike is attracted to his opponent, Mayor's wife's divorce lawyer, Laurie Parres (Paula Marshall). The press thinks that Paul has suffered a nervous breakdown, so Michael hires a psychiatrist to pronounce Paul sane, but Dr. Benjamin unexpectedly commits Paul to an institution.
26	2	"Porn in the U.S.A."	Andy Cadiff	Jeff Lowell	October 1, 1997	202	13.14
After announcing a crackdown on public access pornography, the Mayor is caught on tape, entering an x-rated video store. Mike and Nikki fight over who can spend time with Laurie. Stuart and James lust after Paul's mom (Raquel Welch).
27	3	"Wonder Woman"	Andy Cadiff	Jay Scherick & David Ronn	October 8, 1997	203	12.40
Mike stalks Laurie, and meets her mother. Stuart changes the engine of James' remote controlled boat. Mike tells Laurie he loves her, which left her speechless.
28	4	"The Goodbye Girl"	Andy Cadiff	Gayle Abrams	October 15, 1997	204	12.06
Mike has to make a decision about his relationship with Laurie, after he discovers that she doesn't want a serious commitment. The Mayor falls for a younger woman (Marla Maples). (First Appearance: Stacey (Jennifer Esposito))
29	5	"In the Heat of the Day"	Andy Cadiff	Stephen Godchaux	October 22, 1997	206	12.65
While jogging, Carter is mistaken for a mugger and arrested in Central Park. Paul is afraid he's a racist.
30	6	"Radio Daze"	Andy Cadiff	Kirk J. Rudell	October 29, 1997	208	13.85
When a radio shock jock challenges the Mayor to a mock election, Mike becomes determined to win at all costs. (Guest Stars: Regis Philbin and Kathie Lee Gifford)
31	7	"The Thirty Year Itch"	Andy Cadiff	Michelle Nader & Amy Cohen	November 5, 1997	205	13.47
Mike goes to the Empire State Building to fulfill a promise made to his high school sweetheart (Tracy Pollan). The Mayor asks Carter to determine if his nephew is gay.
32	8	"My Life is a Soap Opera"	Andy Cadiff	Tom Hertz	November 12, 1997	207	13.06
Mike dates a writer for All My Children and sees his personal life being portrayed on television. Stuart uses the rumor that he is gay as a way to get closer to the women at City Hall.
33	9	Family Affair (Part 1)	Andy Cadiff	Brian Buckner & Sebastian Jones	November 19, 1997	209	14.09
Mike's mother (Meredith Baxter) comes to visit. The Mayor is photographed giving money to a known prostitute. Paul gets sued by the security guard who shot him.
34	10	Family Affair (Part 2)	Andy Cadiff	Story by : Brian Buckner & Sebastian Jones; Teleplay by : Jeff Lowell & Tom Hertz	November 26, 1997	210	12.50
Mike's mother could be the key to clearing the Mayor from claims that he solicited a prostitute. Paul appears on The People's Court to settle his lawsuit. (Guest Stars: Former New York City Mayor, Ed Koch and Alan Dershowitz)
35	11	"They Shoot Horses, Don't They?"	Andy Cadiff	Laurie Parres	December 10, 1997	212	13.87
The Mayor's daughter (Alyssa Milano) participates in an animal rights protest to get back at him. Paul arranges to meet his pen pal.
36	12	"Miracle Near 34th Street"	Andy Cadiff	Stephen Godchaux & Gayle Abrams	December 17, 1997	213	12.46
The Mayor accidentally tells a little boy that there is no Santa Claus. James receives a care package from his parents. Note: In 1999, TV Guide ranked this episode # 46 on its "The 50 Funniest TV Moments of All Time" list.
37	13	"Same Time Next Year"	Andy Cadiff	Story by : Michelle Nader & Amy Cohen & Kirk J. Rudell; Teleplay by : Jay Scherick & David Ronn	January 7, 1998	211	14.29
The staff all have trouble remembering what happened at the Mayor's New Year's Eve Party.
38	14	"The Paul Lassiter Story"	Andy Cadiff	Bill Lawrence	January 21, 1998	214	13.85
Mike tries to put his life in perspective as he waits for the results of his physical. Paul tries to convince the Mayor to put him in his autobiography. (Guest Star: Donald Trump)
39	15	"Gentleman's Agreement"	Andy Cadiff	Tim Hobert	January 28, 1998	215	12.14
The Mayor comes under fire for his membership in a club that doesn't allow women. Mos Def guest stars.
40	16	"Deaf Man Walking"	Andy Cadiff	Jeff Lowell	February 25, 1998	218	11.44
The Mayor tries to hide the fact that he's lost his hearing. After helping Stacey move into her own apartment, Stacey's grandmother puts a curse on Mike.
41	17	The Marrying Men	Andy Cadiff	Story by : David Ronn & Jay Scherick; Teleplay by : Michelle Nader & Amy Cohen	March 4, 1998	216	11.27
Paul decides to propose to Claudia. Laurie returns in hopes of restarting her relationship with Mike.
42	18	One Wedding and a Funeral	Andy Cadiff	Tom Hertz	March 11, 1998	217	12.61
Mike announces that he and Laurie are engaged. Paul gets cold feet about asking Claudia to marry him.
43	19	"A River Runs Through Me"	Andy Cadiff	Laurie Parres	March 18, 1998	219	12.44
The staff are required to take drug tests. The Mayor breaks a Native American artifact before it can be donated to a museum.
44	20	"The Pope of Gracie Mansion"	Andy Cadiff	Story by : Michelle Nader & Amy Cohen; Teleplay by : Stephen Godchaux	April 1, 1998	221	11.19
After the Pope visits City Hall, the Mayor tries to be more holy and Mike feels guilty for his sinful ways in City Hall.
45	21	"Bye, Bye, Birdie"	Andy Cadiff	Story by : Kirk J. Rudell; Teleplay by : Brian Buckner & Sebastian Jones	April 29, 1998	220	10.57
The men and women play pranks against each other at Paul and Claudia's bachelor/bachelorette parties. Mike, James, and Carter get trapped in a hardware store when it is robbed.
46	22	"The Lady or the Tiger"	Andy Cadiff	Gayle Abrams & Kirk J. Rudell	May 6, 1998	223	10.68
Mike dates an insane magician, and then has trouble ending their relationship. Stuart and Carter open a gay bar.
47	23	"Single White Male"	Carl Lauten	Michael Lisbe & Nathan Reger	May 6, 1998	224	11.77
Financial troubles cause Stuart and Carter to become roommates.
48	24	"The Paul-Bearer"	Andy Cadiff	Tim Hobert	May 20, 1998	222	9.43
Mike accidentally mixes up the date for Paul's wedding with the date of a city function, causing the chapel to be double booked. Carter has trouble confessing his sexuality to his childhood priest.

=== Season 3 (1998–99) ===
No. overall	No. in season	Title	Directed by	Written by	Original release date	Prod. code	Viewers (millions)
49	1	"Dead Dog Talking"	Andy Cadiff	Tom Hertz	September 22, 1998	301	15.80
City Hall prepares for the mayor's bid for re-election announcement. Carter adopts his family's 19-year-old dog. And, Paul teaches Stacey how to get a sick day without being sick. Conan O'Brien guest stars.
50	2	"There's Something About Heidi"	Andy Cadiff	Amy Cohen & Michelle Nader	September 29, 1998	302	13.89
After Mike's picture with model Heidi Klum is in the tabloids, people assume he's dating her. Nikki reveals to Carter that she has a secret crush on Mike. The Mayor can't stop laughing at inappropriate times.
51	3	"Gone with the Wind"	Andy Cadiff	Stephen Godchaux	October 6, 1998	303	16.12
Mike must keep his relationship with Heidi Klum a secret. Paul creates an incident involving a fan and ashes.
52	4	"The Deer Hunter"	Andy Cadiff	Brian Buckner & Sebastian Jones	October 13, 1998	304	14.15
Mike is handling a political donor in the hope of receiving a donation. Stuart has been named as Stacey's boss for the day. Guest star: Barry Corbin
53	5	"It Happened One Night"	Andy Cadiff	Gayle Abrams	October 20, 1998	305	14.33
Mike considers adopting an abandoned baby. Cameo appearances by Mike's former girlfriends.
54	6	"Three Men and a Little Lady"	Andy Cadiff	Tim Hobert	October 27, 1998	307	14.12
Mike tries to improve the Mayor's macho image. Stuart's girlfriend takes over Carter's apartment. (First appearance: Deidre (Beth Littleford))
55	7	"An Officer and a Gentleman"	Andy Cadiff	David S. Rosenthal	November 3, 1998	306	11.89
Mike's childhood friend returns from a stint in the Navy to reveal he's gay and Mike is jealous when Carter starts dating him. Guest star: Lou Diamond Phillips
56	8	"Quest for Fire"	Andy Cadiff	Jay Scherick & David Ronn	November 10, 1998	309	13.50
Mike suggests a dinner date with Nikki's fictitious boyfriend named Arthur. Mike tries to take a vacation, but the Olympic torch-carrier gets lost in New York; and Paul tries to fit in when he moves into Janelle's Harlem neighborhood.
57	9	"The Kidney's All Right"	Andy Cadiff	Bill Callahan & Philip Wen	November 17, 1998	308	13.07
The mayor makes a promise to give a 14-year-old boy (Frankie Muniz) his kidney. Guest stars: Jeff Gordon and Jayson Williams.
58	10	"Gobble the Wonder Turkey Saves the Day"	Andy Cadiff	Tom Hertz	November 24, 1998	310	15.81
The mayor hosts a televised Thanksgiving dinner. Stacey has a startling moment with Stuart.
59	11	"Local Hero"	Andy Cadiff	Kirk J. Rudell	December 8, 1998	311	13.38
While everyone prepares for the office costume party, Stuart tries to fake an affair with Nikki in order to break up with Deidre.
60	12	"Monkey Business"	Andy Cadiff	Stephen Godchaux	December 15, 1998	312	13.70
Mike is challenged by the intelligence of the city zoo's new Chimpanzee.
61	13	"Taxi Driver"	Andy Cadiff	Tim Hobert	January 5, 1999	314	14.41
Faced with a taxi driver's strike, Mike impersonates a cabbie in order to make a play on Nikki, by driving her boyfriend to the airport.
62	14	"The Nutty Deputy Mayor"	Andy Cadiff	Brian Buckner & Sebastian Jones	January 12, 1999	313	13.80
Mike agrees to use a fat suit for a day to appease the overweight community.
63	15	"Not in the Line of Fire"	Carl Lauten	Michelle Nader & Amy Cohen	January 26, 1999	315	13.23
The mayor doubts his Deputy Mayor's loyalty, when news footage shows Mike fleeing during an assassination attempt.
64	16	"Internal Affairs"	Andy Cadiff	Gayle Abrams	February 9, 1999	316	13.17
Nikki is arrested for prostitution during a tryst with Mike.
65	17	"Dick Clark's Rockin' Make-Out Party '99"	Andy Cadiff	Tom Hertz	February 16, 1999	317	14.42
Stuart breaks up with Deidre, who sues him for sexual harassment in revenge. Can Mike save his friend from losing his job, or is he next?. Stacey's aunt (Priscilla Presley) takes a liking to James.
66	18	"Back to the Future IV: Judgment Day"	Andy Cadiff	David S. Rosenthal	February 23, 1999	318	15.25
Owen Kingston, Mike Flaherty's political mentor from years past, has been hired by the City to oversee New York's Millennium celebrations. There's just one issue: Kingston believes he is the Messiah. Christopher Lloyd guest-stars as Kingston, and Lloyd and Fox make several joking references to the Back to the Future trilogy films they starred in.
67	19	"Politically Incorrect"	Andy Cadiff	David Ronn & Jay Scherick	March 2, 1999	319	13.86
The Mayor appears on Politically Incorrect and reveals that he is dating his secretary. Carter dates a boxer afraid to come out of the closet. Guest star: Bill Maher
68	20	"That's Entertainment"	Andy Cadiff	Story by : Tim Hobert & Gayle Abrams; Teleplay by : Amy Cohen & Michelle Nader	March 16, 1999	326	11.75
Forced to work on Oscar Sunday, the staff have movie themed flashbacks. (Clip show)
69	21	"The Last Temptation of Mike"	Andy Cadiff	J.O.S. Hartung & Clayton Hamilton	April 6, 1999	320	11.60
Mike agrees to be Paul and Claudia's sperm donor. The Mayor keeps bothering James while he writes an article for Sassy Magazine.
70	22	"Carter & Stuart & Bennett & Deirdre"	Andy Cadiff	Mike Royce	April 13, 1999	325	12.08
Carter and Stuart become friends with each other's ex's in order to get back at each other. A temp at City Hall (subbing for Stacey, who is not seen in this episode) thinks Mike is in love with her.
71	23	"The Mayor With Two Brains"	Andy Cadiff	Story by : Brian Buckner & Sebastian Jones; Teleplay by : Stephen Godchaux & Kirk J. Rudell	May 4, 1999	321	12.48
When a reporter gives Carter the limelight in an article meant to be about the Deputy Mayor, Mike becomes jealous.
72	24	"Wall Street"	Andy Cadiff	Philip Wen & Bill Callahan	May 11, 1999	322	11.31
Mike helps James invest his life savings. The mayor gets his own action figure. Guest star: Jon Stewart
73	25	Klumageddon (Part 1)	Andy Cadiff	Kirk J. Rudell	May 18, 1999	323	12.68
When The Mayor appoints Heidi Klum to work on an Animal Rights project with Mike, the supermodel tries to rekindle their previous relationship.
74	26	Klumageddon (Part 2)	Andy Cadiff	Story by : David Ronn & Jay Scherick; Teleplay by : Bill Callahan & Philip Wen	May 25, 1999	324	22.95
When Nikki overhears Mike agreeing to dump the Mayor for Janelle, she thinks he's breaking up with her. Stuart gives Carter's dog to Heidi Klum. (Last appearance of Stacey)

=== Season 4 (1999–2000) ===
No. overall	No. in season	Title	Directed by	Written by	Original release date	Prod. code	Viewers (millions)
75	1	"Catcher in the Bronx"	Andy Cadiff	Tom Hertz	September 21, 1999	401	11.89
Mike tries to remember what happened between him and Heidi Klum the night before. Mike also has to find a Senate campaign manager for the mayor. Guest stars: James Carville, Roger Clemens (First appearance: Caitlin Moore (Heather Locklear))
76	2	"James and the Giant Speech"	Andy Cadiff	Stephen Godchaux	September 28, 1999	402	11.25
Caitlin makes her presence known around City Hall by firing James as the speech writer and taking over Paul's office. The Mayor cheats at golf. Guest star: Nipsey Russell
77	3	"All the Mayor's Men"	Andy Cadiff	Jon Pollack	October 5, 1999	403	12.46
Mike plans a break-in of the Mayor's office in order to find out what dirt Caitlin has on him.
78	4	"These Shoes Were Made for Cheatin'"	Andy Cadiff	Tad Quill	October 12, 1999	404	12.40
Mike tricks Nikki into a couples therapy session. Stuart wants to join a gay gym. The mayor tries to pass an eighth grade quiz.
79	5	"Rebel Without a Chair"	Andy Cadiff	Jay Scherick & David Ronn	October 19, 1999	405	11.11
After being nominated for "Activist of the Year", Carter begins to feel unworthy of the award. Mike interrupts an interview, that results in a homosexual newspaper printing that he and the Mayor are an item.
80	6	"The Mayor May Not"	Andy Cadiff	Tom Hertz	November 2, 1999	406	11.62
Bickering between Mike and Caitlin causes the Mayor to drop out of the Senate race. Paul and James wage a practical joke war against Stuart. Guest star: Al D'Amato.
81	7	"The Great Debate"	Andy Cadiff	Jill Cargerman	November 9, 1999	409	14.22
After Caitlin bankrupts the Mayors Senate campaign, Mike woos a socialite (Amy Irving) to help raise funds. Nikki falls for an intern.
82	8	"How to Bury a Millionaire"	Andy Cadiff	Christopher Case	November 16, 1999	407	15.47
During a rescue attempt of a baby trapped in a well, the Mayor falls down a rescue shaft. Paul appears on Who Wants To Be A Millionaire?. Guest star: Regis Philbin
83	9	"The Thanksgiving Show"	Andy Cadiff	Richard Day	November 23, 1999	411	15.01
Paul thinks Caitlin is hitting on him. To not confuse a senator, Mike and Caitlin pretend that they are a couple and must share a room. Stuart and Deirdre are back together. Nikki and Janelle protect Sparky the turkey from James's evil clutches.
84	10	"The Doorman Always Rings Twice"	Andy Cadiff	Tim Hobert	November 30, 1999	408	10.75
With the Mayor out of town campaigning, Mike becomes the interim mayor and sets off a citywide doorman strike. Paul opens a politically themed restaurant.
85	11	"Mustang Mikey"	Carl Lauten	Jay Scherick & David Ronn	December 7, 1999	410	10.23
Mike and Caitlin go for a joyride in the Mayor's classic 1966 Ford Mustang and accidentally get it towed. James regains his speech writing duties and hires Deirdre to be Mike's new secretary.
86	12	"My Dinner with Caitlin (a.k.a. Christmas 1999)"	Andy Cadiff	Bill Callahan & Philip Wen	December 21, 1999	413	10.75
Mike throws a Christmas party and invites Caitlin, then cancels the party so he can be alone with her. When she shows up with her own date, Mike has to get some guests.
87	13	"A Tale of Two Sisters"	Andy Cadiff	Jon Pollack	January 12, 2000	416	16.17
Challenged to find a way to get over his crush on Caitlin, Mike makes a date with another woman: Caitlin's sister (Christine Taylor)
88	14	"Casino"	Andy Cadiff	Tim Hobert	February 2, 2000	414	15.18
After a raffle snafu messed up by Paul, Mike must come up with $500,000, so he takes Paul to Atlantic City to count cards. Stuart and Carter blackmail Caitlin.
89	15	"The Marry Caitlin Moore Show"	John Fortenberry	Tad Quill	February 9, 2000	415	12.02
Mike needs to hire a director to film the Mayor's newest Senate commercial and ends up hiring Caitlin's ex-husband. After a nasty rash, Paul becomes addicted to using makeup. Guest stars: Star Jones, Joy Behar, Lisa Ling, & Meredith Vieira
90	16	"Suffragette City"	Andy Cadiff	Tom Hertz	February 16, 2000	417	11.80
Caitlin's rekindled relationship with her ex-husband drives Mike crazy. Carter enlists Stuart to help him bust a discriminating landlord by posing as a couple.
91	17	"Mike's Best Friend's Boyfriend"	Andy Cadiff	Dawn Urbont	February 23, 2000	412	10.82
Mike thinks Carter's boyfriend is hitting on him.
92	18	"The Pig Whisperer"	Andy Cadiff	Jay Scherick & David Ronn	March 8, 2000	418	11.43
Mike enlists James' help to evict a squatting Tomato farmer, by forcing him to enter a pig contest.
93	19	"Uneasy Rider"	Andy Cadiff	Tim Hobert & Jon Pollack	March 22, 2000	422	12.33
The Mayor's father dies and Mike urges him to get in touch with his feelings. James thinks that Caitlin is attracted to him. Carter is upset that the office staff are using Paul's "Magic 8 Ball" instead of him for advice.
94	20	"About Last Night"	David S. Rosenthal	Tad Quill	April 19, 2000	425	11.21
Preparing for a visit by the President, members of the staff deemed "Non-vital personnel" drown their sorrows at the local bar. Paul schemes to get his picture taken with the President.
95	21	"Don't Get on the Bus"	Andy Cadiff	Philip Wen & Bill Callahan	April 26, 2000	419	11.34
Upon learning that Caitlin and her ex are getting remarried, Mike hits him with the Mayor's tour bus. Paul and James try to look like Carter in attempt to be treated smarter around the office.
96	22	"Airplane!"	Andy Cadiff	Jay Scherick & David Ronn	May 3, 2000	420	14.98
Mike tries to win over Caitlin during a flight to San Francisco. The Mayor tries to change a light bulb in his office. Guest star: Patrick Ewing.
97	23	"An American Deputy Mayor in Paris"	Andy Cadiff	Bill Callahan & Philip Wen	May 10, 2000	421	13.22
Mike flies to Paris to stop Caitlin from getting remarried.
98	24	"The Commitments"	Andy Cadiff	Jill Cargerman	May 17, 2000	426	15.19
To show Caitlin that their relationship is more than physical, Mike abstains from sex for a week.
99	25	Goodbye (Part 1)	Andy Cadiff	Sarah Dunn	May 24, 2000	423	32.76
City Hall is threatened by a reporter to reveal that the Mayor has mob connections. Guest star: Michael Gross as Mike's therapist.
100	26	Goodbye (Part 2)	Andy Cadiff	Bill Lawrence	May 24, 2000	424	32.76
Mike fires himself to save everybody else. Mike says goodbye to the mayor and the staff and walks out of City Hall for the last time until a brief return in season 6. (Also the last appearances of James, Nikki, and Janelle)

=== Season 5 (2000–01) ===
No. overall	No. in season	Title	Directed by	Written by	Original release date	Prod. code	Viewers (millions)
101	1	"Hello Charlie"	Ted Wass	Tom Hertz	October 18, 2000	504	13.45
Charlie Crawford spends his first day in office as New York City's Deputy Mayor. The Mayor has trouble adjusting to office life without Mike. First appearance: Charlie Sheen as Charlie Crawford.
102	2	"Smile"	Ted Wass	Chris Henchy	October 25, 2000	501	11.27
The mayor's dentist dies in the middle of a procedure. Carter and Stuart deal with a bike messenger who keeps stealing their parking spot
103	3	"The Spanish Prisoner"	Ted Wass	Bill Callahan & Phillip Wen	November 1, 2000	505	12.52
The media finds out that Charlie is taking a Spanish course, thanks to Caitlin's meddling. Meanwhile Paul and the mayor decide that the office needs some more water cooler-talk. (First appearance of Angie)
104	4	"The Bone Collectors"	Ted Wass	Jon Pollack & Tim Hobert	November 8, 2000	506	13.45
Stuart and Paul are put in charge of an archaeological dig. The mayor takes a much needed vacation.
105	5	"Blind Faith"	Ted Wass	Michelle Nader	November 15, 2000	503	14.55
Charlie's advice prompts Claudia to become a nun.
106	6	"Balloons over Broadway"	Ted Wass	Mark Banker	November 22, 2000	508	10.91
Paul convinces his mother that he is dating Caitlin, so she won't be upset that Claudia left him. Charlie tries to prove to Caitlin that his girlfriend isn't dumb. A quickly made balloon for the Thanksgiving parade goes awry in New York.
107	7	"Lost and Found"	Ted Wass	Bonnie Schneider & Hadley Davis	November 29, 2000	509	13.41
Caitlin and Charlie fight for the attention of Caitlin's new friend. Carter, Stuart and Paul compete for a trip to New Orleans with the mayor.
108	8	"All the Wrong Moves"	Ted Wass	Stacy Traub	December 6, 2000	510	12.33
An overworked Charlie causes problems after beating the mayor at racquetball. Paul's annual request for a raise is approved by the mayor after his loss of self esteem. Stuart hires an actor to go out with Carter.
109	9	"The Burgers of Wrath"	Ted Wass	Mark Torgove & Paul A. Kaplan	December 13, 2000	502	9.00
Carter's behavior at a press conference results in the Mayor working a shift at a fast food restaurant. Stuart tries to impress the new secretary by posing as a biker.
110	10	"Toy Story"	Ted Wass	Chris Henchy	December 20, 2000	511	11.99
Paul struggles to find the best joke for the mayor's Christmas card. Carter convinces Caitlin to volunteer with him at a retirement community. The mayor's attempt to be more involved in the office process goes awry.
111	11	"The Perfect Dorm"	Ted Wass	Jon Pollack & Tim Hobert	January 10, 2001	507	11.47
Paul has to find a new place to stay after his ex-wife kicks him out, so he moves into a dorm.
112	12	"Hey Judith"	Ted Wass	Paul A. Kaplan & Mark Torgove	January 17, 2001	512	10.23
The Mayor's new girlfriend clashes with Charlie over who should write an upcoming speech. Stuart is selected by ESPN to win a million dollars in a hockey contest. Guest star: Barry Melrose.
113	13	"The Gambler"	Ted Wass	Bill Callahan & Philip Wen	January 24, 2001	514	10.44
The guys invite Charlie to play poker. Caitlin helps the Mayor become more self sufficient.
114	14	"In the Company of Dudes"	Ted Wass	Michelle Nader	February 7, 2001	513	10.40
When the Mayor is named in a lawsuit, Charlie hires an old college buddy (Jason Priestley) to defend him. Paul and Stuart compete to win the affections of a new worker.
115	15	"The Image Maker"	Ted Wass	Bill Callahan & Philip Wen	February 14, 2001	515	13.61
Caitlin hires an image consultant to make over the Mayor. A woman from Stuart's past comes back to haunt him. Guest star: Rosie O'Donnell
116	16	"Trainstopping"	Ted Wass	Jon Pollack & Tim Hobert	February 21, 2001	516	7.67
When the Mayor takes a ride on the NYC Subway to prove its safety and efficiency, it breaks down, making Charlie late for an important date.
117	17	"Rain on My Charades"	Ted Wass	Peter Schneider	February 28, 2001	517	10.53
Charlie realizes that he is ready for a committed relationship.
118	18	"You've Got Male"	Ted Wass	Mark Torgove & Paul A. Kaplan	April 25, 2001	518	8.26
Caitlin and Charlie compete for an important account. The Mayor is criticized for not being more sensitive to women's issues.
119	19	"Minor League"	Ted Wass	Bill Callahan & Philip Wen	May 2, 2001	519	8.53
Charlie tries out for a minor league team. The Mayor receives a death threat in the mail from an unlikely source. (Special guest voice: Bob Costas)
120	20	"Science Friction"	Ted Wass	Reese Bryant	May 9, 2001	520	8.68
The media's reaction to the Mayor's ex-wife's tell-all book leads to humiliation and a boycott of the press. Caitlin dates a philanthropist (Scott Wolf) who's really into science fiction. Guest star: Roy Firestone.
121	21	"Brotherly Love"	Ted Wass	Stacy Traub & Bonnie Schneider & Hadley Davis	May 16, 2001	521	8.74
Charlie attempts to interfere with Caitlin and Tim's burgeoning relationship. Meanwhile, Carter hires his sister to work at City Hall and will go to any length to avoid people discovering their connection.
122	22	A Shot in the Dark (Part 1)	Ted Wass	Paul A. Kaplan & Mark Torgove	May 23, 2001	522	7.76
While on a police drive along, Charlie is shot. Carter and Stuart's friendship is seen in a different light.
123	23	A Shot in the Dark (Part 2)	Ted Wass	Tim Hobert & Jon Pollack	May 23, 2001	523	8.74
Charlie dates a mentally unstable woman (Vanessa Marcil) to save face in front of Caitlin and her new boyfriend.

=== Season 6 (2001–02) ===
No. overall	No. in season	Title	Directed by	Written by	Original release date	Prod. code	Viewers (millions)
124	1	"The Arrival"	Ted Wass	Tom Hertz	September 25, 2001	601	13.38
The mayor begins a relationship with a judge (Farrah Fawcett) whose divorce is not finalized. Charlie confronts his feelings for Caitlin, but must take a backseat when Mike returns.: The episode originally was supposed to air on September 18th, but was delayed for one week until the 25th due to the terrorist attacks that occurred in NYC earlier on September, 11th.
125	2	"A Tree Falls in Manhattan"	Ted Wass	Jon Pollack	September 25, 2001	602	13.38
Wanting to impress his new girlfriend, the Mayor accidentally chops down a historical landmark tree that was planted by George Washington. Charlie becomes involved with Jennifer Duncan (Denise Richards), who is an opponent's Campaign Manager. (First Appearance: Tom Amandes as Julian Wheeler)
126	3	"Wife with Mikey"	Ted Wass	Tim Hobert	October 2, 2001	605	9.89
Mike returns to City Hall to work on the Mayor's re-election campaign and to break-up with his fiancée (Olivia d'Abo), only to change his mind and marry her instead. (Last appearance of Mike)
127	4	"The Apartment II"	Ted Wass	Michelle Nader	October 9, 2001	603	7.73
As polls show that the public disapproves of the Mayor's relationship with a married woman, Charlie finds his apartment being used as a secret hideaway. Caitlin asks Carter to go to a baby shower with her. Note that this episode uses the same title as episode 3 of season 1, but otherwise has no direct connection to that episode.
128	5	"Yet Another Stakeout"	Ted Wass	Chris Henchy	October 16, 2001	604	7.68
Wheeler begins a smear campaign on the Mayor. Stuart begins a relationship with the love of his life (Lori Loughlin), but objects to her being a surrogate for Carter.
129	6	"Yeah Baby!"	Ted Wass	Bill Callahan & Philip Wen	October 23, 2001	606	9.21
Carter's surrogate announces that she's pregnant and that the baby might be Stuarts. The Mayor hires a psychic political advisor (Queen Latifah).
130	7	"Sleeping with the Enemy"	Ted Wass	Mark Torgrove & Paul A. Kaplan	November 6, 2001	607	8.75
Charlie's continued relationship with Wheeler's campaign manager results in the Mayor having to reveal a secret to the press. Paul asks Caitlin to help him woo a member of the Winston campaign.
131	8	"She's Gotta Habit"	Ted Wass	Stacy Traub	November 6, 2001	608	8.75
After Jennifer admits to having a lesbian affair, Charlie fears she's falling for Caitlin. Paul arranges for the Mayor's girlfriend to arbitrate his divorce settlement.
132	9	"The Wedding Scammer"	Ted Wass	Bonnie Schneider & Hadley Davis	November 13, 2001	609	8.06
Caitlin's mother (Michelle Phillips) arrives in New York for a family wedding. Paul and Stuart go to a Victoria's Secret fashion show. (Guest Star: Rhea Durham)
133	10	"Fight Flub"	Ted Wass	Mark Torgrove & Paul A. Kaplan	November 20, 2001	610	9.60
After Wheeler suffers a heart attack, his wife (Elizabeth Mitchell) runs for mayor in his place.
134	11	"Chinatown"	Ted Wass	Bill Callahan & Philip Wen	November 27, 2001	611	8.95
On Election Day, the Mayor proposes to Claire and Charlie and Jennifer make a decision on the future of their relationship.
135	12	"An Office and a Gentleman"	Ted Wass	Tim Hobert	December 11, 2001	612	7.83
Charlie evaluates the staff to determine who is more worthy of a new office. Caitlin agrees to go on a date with a City Hall Santa who refuses to remove his costume.
136	13	"O Mother, Where Art Thou?"	Ted Wass	Jon Pollack	January 8, 2002	613	7.75
Carter sets the Mayor up with a woman (Judith Light) who has a very personal history with the Winston Family. Caitlin and Charlie date a father and his daughter and end up in a family therapy session with them.(First Appearance: Tom (Perry King)).
137	14	"Rags to Riches"	Ted Wass	Mark Torgrove & Paul A. Kaplan	March 5, 2002	614	7.09
Caitlin invites Charlie's father (Martin Sheen) to attend a surprise birthday dinner. Paul tries to help Carter mourn the death of Rags. Absent: Alan Ruck as Stuart Bondek
138	15	"Sex, Lies and Video Date"	Ted Wass	Michelle Nader	March 12, 2002	615	8.12
The Mayor warns Charlie not to pursue his niece (Amy Jo Johnson). Paul appears on Blind Date. Guest Star: Roger Lodge.
139	16	"Eyes Wide Open"	Ted Wass	Chris Henchy	March 19, 2002	616	8.33
Called away to an important meeting, Carter asks Charlie to watch over a sixteen-year-old boy (John Francis Daley) he is mentoring. The Mayor has trouble sleeping.
140	17	"Age Against the Machine"	Ted Wass	Hugh Webber	March 26, 2002	617	6.89
Charlie starts to feel his age after nights of endless partying with a younger girl and her friends. Carter asks Stuart to be his wingman at a Gay fundraiser.
141	18	"An Affair Not to Remember"	Ted Wass	Bill Callahan & Philip Wen	April 9, 2002	618	6.83
While the Mayor acts as a Celebrity bartender, Caitlin reflects on her first love and realizes Charlie is to blame for losing him. Absent: Alan Ruck as Stuart Bondek
142	19	"Let's Give Them Something to Talk About"	Ted Wass	Stacy Traub	April 16, 2002	619	7.26
Charlie tries to fulfill Caitlin's fantasies. Paul appears on a controversial radio talk show. (Guest Star: Larry Elder) Absent: Alan Ruck as Stuart Bondek
143	20	"Look Who's Not Talking"	Ted Wass	Hadley Davis & Bonnie Schneider	April 23, 2002	620	7.25
Caitlin ends her relationship with Tom and tells Charlie she's interested in dating him. When they go out on their first date, things are awkward... until they end up in bed together, that is. But are they ready for a real relationship? Meanwhile, the Mayor hires a temp, Pete, to fill in for Stuart while he's out, but Paul and Carter see him as a threat. Absent: Alan Ruck as Stuart Bondek
144	21	"A Tale of Four Cities"	Ted Wass	Reese Bryant	April 30, 2002	621	6.89
Unhappy with how Charlie interacts with an old flame, Caitlin tries to make Charlie jealous by showing interest in a reporter. The Mayors of New York and Los Angeles (Robert Hays) compete to make Paris their sister city. Absent: Alan Ruck as Stuart Bondek
145	22	"A Friend in Need"	Ted Wass	Story by : Robert Cornick; Teleplay by : Tom Hertz	April 30, 2002	622	6.89
Surveillance footage shows Charlie and Caitlin having sex in the Mayor's office. Carter finally gets a foster child, that won't stop crying unless it's held by Paul.
