= 30 Days (1999 film) =

1999 film by Aaron Harnick

- Directed by: Aaron Harnick
- Written by: Aaron Harnick
- Produced by: Matthew Rego; Michael Rego; Arielle Tepper
- Starring: Ben Shenkman; Arija Bareikis; Alexander Chaplin; Bradley White; Thomas McCarthy; Catherine Kellner
- Cinematography: David Tumblety
- Edited by: Sean Campbell
- Music by: Andrew Sherman; Stephen J. Walsh
- Production companies: The Araca Group; Arielle Tepper Productions
- Distributed by: Arrow Releasing
- Release dates: September 11, 1999 (TIFF); September 15, 2000 (United States)
- Running time: 87 minutes
- Country: United States
- Language: English
- Box office: $13,753

30 Days is a 1999 American romantic comedy film written and directed by Aaron Harnick in his directorial debut. It stars Ben Shenkman, Arija Bareikis, Alexander Chaplin, Bradley White, Thomas McCarthy, and Catherine Kellner. It follows a neurotic young New York Jew, whose best friend is getting married in 30 days, as he goes out on a blind date with a girl and asks her to marry him.

The film had its world premiere at the 24th Toronto International Film Festival on September 11, 1999. It was given a limited theatrical release in the United States on September 15, 2000, by Arrow Releasing.

== Plot ==
Jordan is a successful businessman with commitment issues, so friends decided to match him with an NBC casting director Sarah, who is going through some emotional issues. They agree to sleep together after Jordan reveals he doesn't know the name of a woman he recently slept with. But later they decide to become a romantic couple. However, after their first fight, the relationship is over. Jordan later realises how important Sarah is to him and proceeds to try to win her back.

== Cast ==
- Ben Shenkman as Jordan Trainer
- Arija Bareikis as Sarah Meyers
- Alexander Chaplin as Mike Charles
- Bradley White as Tad Star
- Thomas McCarthy as Brad Drazin
- Catherine Kellner as Lauren
- Jerry Adler as Rick Trainer
- Barbara Barrie as Barbara Trainer
- Arden Myrin as Stacey
- Mark Feuerstein as Actor
- Lisa Edelstein as Danielle
- Tina Holmes as Jenny

== Reception ==
=== Critical response ===
Metacritic, which uses a weighted average, assigned the film a score of 30 out of 100, based on 4 critics, indicating "generally unfavorable" reviews.

Eddie Cockrell of Variety commented, "Though shrewdly written and well acted, the ensembler squanders such irony-drenched, funny observations as the undefrosted freezer as fear-of-relationship metaphor (kicker to which comes after closing credits) in pursuit of post-slacker guy dynamics." A. O. Scott of The New York Times described the film as "a romantic comedy that seems to have been pulled from the generic frozen-food section of the supermarket and brought up to room temperature in the microwave." Scott also stated, "The problem is that 30 Days consists of nothing but the conventions, without any animating complication or insight. It seems to be written in shorthand, with minimal dialogue and no sense of how emotions might be conveyed, other than by the use of sappy folk music." Jami Bernard of the New York Daily News called the film "hit-and-miss" and opined, "Aaron Harnick has something, and once he has refined and polished it a bit, he may be able to do what Woody Allen once did for urban relationships."
