= Spin City =

American television series (1996–2002)

- Season 1 intertitle
- Genre: Sitcom; Political satire
- Created by: Gary David Goldberg; Bill Lawrence
- Starring: Michael J. Fox; Carla Gugino; Richard Kind; Alan Ruck; Michael Boatman; Connie Britton; Alexander Chaplin; Barry Bostwick; Victoria Dillard; Jennifer Esposito; Heather Locklear; Charlie Sheen; Lana Parrilla
- Theme music composer: Spin Doctors (seasons 2–3)
- Composers: Shelly Palmer (seasons 1–4); Danny Pelfrey (seasons 5–6)
- Country of origin: United States
- Original language: English
- No. of seasons: 6
- No. of episodes: 145 (list of episodes)

Production
- Executive producers: Gary David Goldberg; Michael J. Fox; Bill Lawrence; Andy Cadiff (season 4); Richard Day (season 4); David S. Rosenthal (season 4); Tom Hertz (season 6)
- Camera setup: Film; Multi-camera
- Running time: 30 minutes
- Production companies: Ubu Productions; Lottery Hill Entertainment; DreamWorks Television

Original release
- Network: ABC
- Release: September 17, 1996 – April 30, 2002

Spin City is an American sitcom television series that aired from September 17, 1996, to April 30, 2002, on ABC. Created by Gary David Goldberg and Bill Lawrence and produced by Ubu Productions, Lottery Hill Entertainment and DreamWorks Television, the show is set in a fictionalized version of the New York City mayor's office, and originally starred Michael J. Fox as Mike Flaherty, the Deputy Mayor of New York. Fox departed in 2000 at the conclusion of the fourth season due to symptoms of Parkinson's disease, and Charlie Sheen became the new lead as Charlie Crawford for the final two seasons.

== Premise ==
The series presents a fictionalized version of the local government of New York City, and follows its mayor Randall Winston (Barry Bostwick) and his staff as they run the city, although the main person in charge is Deputy mayor Mike Flaherty (Fox). Mike is talented at his job, dealing with political spin and office chaos, but not so good at managing his personal life, which he neglects. Other members of staff at City Hall include press secretary Paul Lassiter (Richard Kind), the office snitch and a manipulative coward, who has a habit of being a troublemaker and is often kept in the dark about things; chief of staff Stuart Bondek (Alan Ruck), who thinks of himself as a lothario and is highly sexist; and head of minority affairs Carter Heywood (Michael Boatman), a gay black man with a suicidal dog named Rags.

Also on the staff are speech writer James Hobert (Alexander Chaplin), who is weak-willed and gullible; Mike's secretary Janelle Cooper (Victoria Dillard), who is no-nonsense, pragmatic, and slightly apathetic towards the general chaos of her work; and accountant Nikki Faber (Connie Britton), who eventually starts a romantic relationship with Mike. Janelle later becomes the mayor's secretary and Stacey Paterno (Jennifer Esposito) joins the show as Mike's secretary and Paul's nemesis. Together, this group helps run City Hall, improves the Mayor's image, and covers for his frequent mistakes—while sorting out their own personal issues.

The nature of Carter and Stuart's relationship became a running gag during the series. The two ended up becoming so close, their friendship was mocked by others, and their arguments sounded so much like husband and wife, a whole episode was dedicated to the notion that the two argued like a married couple. The two ended up meeting an older duo of best friends (one black and one white) who were virtual twins of Carter and Stuart in terms of personality; when it was discovered that the two older versions had become a couple, it ended up scaring Stuart quite a bit. For his part, Stuart tends to be very protective of his time with Carter, going so far as to be genuinely jealous when Carter spends more time with new campaign manager Caitlin (Heather Locklear). In spite of all the jokes and flirtations, they prove to be best friends willing to do anything for each other. This, too, was considered an important moment in television history, with essayist and poet Orville Lloyd Douglas noting, "I love the fact that the writers of Spin City explored the fact that gay men and heterosexual men can be friends. The straight man doesn't have to worry that the gay man might hit on him."

== Production ==
=== Early development ===
At one point in development, the show was simply called Spin, which was changed when ABC was unable to secure rights to the name from the similarly named music magazine. At the start of the series, Mike is dating reporter Ashley Schaeffer (Carla Gugino). In early promos for the series, the relationship was shown to be the main premise of the show. Midway through the first season, however, Mike and Ashley separated and her character was written out.

Spin City was one of six shows produced by DreamWorks Television in the lead up to the launch of its more successful parent company DreamWorks Pictures, which started releasing movies in September 1997 with The Peacemaker. Out of these initial shows, Spin City was the only one that was considered to be a hit by the time the movie division launched.

=== Later years ===
In 1998, Michael J. Fox announced he had Parkinson's disease. As a result, a new character, Caitlin Moore (Locklear) was introduced at the start of the 1999–2000 season to help lessen Fox's workload. Caitlin was Mayor Winston's campaign manager as he decided to run for Senator, and much conflict occurred between Mike and Caitlin about who was in charge of the mayor. Their relationship was more complex than a simple feud, and hints were dropped that it would become romantic.

In 2000, as his symptoms got more severe, Fox announced he was leaving the show at the end of the season to spend more time with his family and to raise awareness of Parkinson's. His character left City Hall at the end of the show's fourth season, taking the blame for an alleged Mafia link the mayor unknowingly had. A brief coda to the fourth-season finale revealed that the character moved to Washington, D.C., becoming an environmental lobbyist and there meeting a young senator named Alex P. Keaton, the character Fox played on Family Ties. Executive producer and co-creator Bill Lawrence also left the show, along with a few cast members and writers/producers.

The remaining producers decided to carry on the series with a new lead. For the show's fifth season, Charlie Sheen, as new Deputy Mayor Charlie Crawford, joined Caitlin, Paul, Stuart, Carter, and the mayor. The characters of Nikki, James, and Janelle were written out, to be replaced by assistant Angie Ordonez (Lana Parrilla), although she left without explanation before the show's sixth and final season. With the change of the lead character, also came a change in its production location, from Fox's home in the New York City area to Los Angeles. In a November 2000 interview, DreamWorks co-founder Jeffrey Katzenberg credited Sheen's chemistry with Heather Locklear as helping the show survive Fox's departure. He said, "the core of the relationship between Charlie’s character and Heather’s character has allowed the show to be reinvented." The show would carry on with Sheen for two seasons, with ABC canceling the series in May 2002.

== Characters ==
Actor	Character	Season 1	Season 2	Season 3	Season 4	Season 5	Season 6	Appearances
Michael J. Fox	Mike Flaherty	Main	Main	Main	Main		Guest	103
Richard Kind	Paul Lassiter	Main	Main	Main	Main	Main	Main	145
Alan Ruck	Stuart Bondek	Main	Main	Main	Main	Main	Main	140
Michael Boatman	Carter Heywood	Main	Main	Main	Main	Main	Main	145
Barry Bostwick	Mayor Randall Winston	Main	Main	Main	Main	Main	Main	144
Carla Gugino	Ashley Schaeffer	Main (Note: Gugino was written out midseason and stopped being credited after episode 12.)		Guest				13
Connie Britton	Nikki Faber	Main	Main	Main	Main			100
Alexander Chaplin	James Hobert	Main	Main	Main	Main			100
Heather Locklear	Caitlin Moore				Main	Main	Main	71
Victoria Dillard	Janelle Cooper	Recurring	Main	Main	Main			91
Jennifer Esposito	Stacey Paterno		Main	Main				46
Charlie Sheen	Charlie Crawford					Main	Main	45
Lana Parrilla	Angie Ordonez					Main		21

- Michael J. Fox as Mike Flaherty. Deputy Mayor of New York and a playboy, Flaherty lives in a New York City bachelor pad and is constantly balancing his personal life and his job, trying to maintain a healthy distance between the two. Flaherty leaves the mayor's office at the end of season four, after taking the blame for an unknown mob connection the Mayor had. (Fox left the series due to Parkinson's disease, but returns during the first three episodes of the sixth season, culminating in his marriage.)
- Charlie Sheen as Charlie Crawford, Mike's replacement for the final two seasons. He, too, is a playboy and at first struggles to keep his troubled past from getting in the way of his new position. He eventually becomes romantically involved with Caitlin by the end of the series' run. He is also romantically involved with Jennifer Duncan, played by Sheen's real-life partner at the time, Denise Richards; his father is also played by Sheen's real-life father Martin Sheen.
- Richard Kind as Paul Thomas Lassiter, press secretary at City Hall. A known troublemaker and childish member of the group, he is often the victim of practical jokes or mishaps at City Hall. Paul went to the Columbia University Graduate School of Journalism and previously worked for Congressman Chuck Schumer. During the show he marries Claudia Sachs, who in season five leaves him to become a nun. In an ABC crossover, Paul wins the top prize on Who Wants to Be a Millionaire. By the end of the show, he moves into an apartment across the hall from Carter and Stuart.
- Alan Ruck as Stuart Bondek, chief of staff at City Hall. He is narcissistic and a love-rat, although he is unsuccessful at maintaining a relationship. Early on in the series, he moves into an apartment with Carter, which generates a rivalry as he is a homophobe and is generally uncomfortable around Carter's dog and his uptight lifestyle, though they eventually become best friends.
- Michael Boatman as Carter Heywood, head of Minority Affairs at City Hall. His character was met with positive reaction because of his portrayal as a prominent gay black character in a TV series. Carter owns a suicidal old dog named Rags, who dies towards the end of the series. In the same season, Carter decides he will adopt a baby; in the final episode he welcomes a boy named Sam.
- Barry Bostwick as Mayor Randall Winston, the inept Mayor of New York City. It is stated that he was a state assemblyman sometime prior to his election as mayor. At one point during the show he runs for the Senate, although between seasons he apparently changed his mind. He is married at the beginning of the show but gets divorced during its run and his ex-wife writes a tell-all book about life with the Mayor. He develops a relationship with his secretary Janelle during season three. During the final season, he develops a relationship with Judge Claire Simmons (Farrah Fawcett), but she dumps him when she reveals she does not want to live life in the public eye.
- Carla Gugino as Ashley Schaeffer, a journalist and love interest for Mike during the first half of Season 1 (12 episodes). She was written out when the show started to focus more on the workplace, but returned for one episode in season three.
- Paula Marshall as Laurie Parres, Mike's girlfriend and - briefly - fiancée, in Season 2.
- Connie Britton as Nikki Faber, a co-worker at City Hall. She is confident and free-spirited, often dates dangerous men, and is repeatedly harassed by her family to get married. She develops an on/off relationship with Mike. She leaves after season four for unknown reasons.
- Alexander Chaplin as James Leonard Hobert III, a speech writer at City Hall. He is shown to be anxious and shy, and early in the show has a crush on Nikki. During season four, he is fired in favor of Caitlin being hired as marketing campaigner, and James is hired as Mike's secretary, although he is led to believe his position is as 'Deputy Deputy Mayor'. He also leaves after season four for unknown reasons.
- Heidi Klum as herself (or a version of herself) who dates Mike in Season 3 and also appears briefly in Season 4.
- Heather Locklear as Caitlin Moore, introduced into the show in season four to lessen Michael J. Fox's screentime after he announced he had Parkinson's disease. She is brought onto the staff as marketing campaigner, and takes James' old desk, while James becomes Mike's secretary. She becomes romantically involved with both leads by the end of each of their respective tenures on the show.
- Taylor Stanley as Karen, a college intern who works as Mike's assistant in the first season.
- Victoria Dillard as Janelle Cooper, Mike's secretary during the first season, promoted to the Mayor's secretary during the second. She develops a relationship with the Mayor during season three. She leaves after season four for unknown reasons.
- Jennifer Esposito as Stacey Paterno, who replaced Janelle as Mike's secretary for seasons two and three after Janelle became the Mayor's secretary. She is from Brooklyn and is shown to be very outgoing, much like Nikki. She leaves after season three for unknown reasons.
- Lana Parrilla as Angie Ordonez, Charlie's secretary. She was only featured in season five, as Parrilla left following the season, thinking her character was underused. No secretary is shown during season six, and her desk is left empty. Some of the cast are shown using it, albeit not permanently, implying Charlie is no longer using a secretary.
- Beth Littleford as Deirdre West, Stuart's girlfriend, in Seasons 3 & 4.

== Episodes ==
Season	Episodes	Originally released		Rank	Avg. rating (Note: In households; season 1 only)/ Avg. viewers (Note: In millions; seasons 2-6)
Season	Episodes	First released	Last released	Rank	Avg. rating/ Avg. viewers
1	24	September 17, 1996	May 13, 1997	17	11.7
2	24	September 24, 1997	May 20, 1998	47	12.0
3	26	September 22, 1998	May 25, 1999	28	13.1
4	26	September 21, 1999	May 24, 2000	33	12.4
5	23	October 18, 2000	May 23, 2001	53	10.8
6	22	September 25, 2001	April 30, 2002	78	8.4

== Awards and nominations ==
Michael J. Fox won one Primetime Emmy, out of four nominations. The show won four Golden Globes (three for Fox and one for Sheen), out of its nine nominations.

== Syndication ==
Spin City entered off-network syndication on UPN, Fox and The WB affiliates from fall 2000 until fall 2005 and aired on FX from fall 2005 until fall 2010. When airing in syndication from 2000 to 2005, the series was distributed in association with Paramount Domestic Television, whose parent company would later buy the rights to the show.

In August 2015, the series started airing on digital multicast television network Laff. In July 2020, every episode was added to Australian streaming service Stan. In February 2021, the entire series was added to Paramount's free streaming service Pluto TV in the United States, and then was available for a period of time on Amazon Prime Video starting in September 2023. In 2023 it was added to Channel 4's ad supported/premium streaming platform in the United Kingdom. In October 2025, Spin City began re-airing in Ireland and the UK on Comedy Central.

== Home media ==
Shout! Factory and DreamWorks Home Entertainment has released all six seasons of Spin City on DVD in Region 1.

DreamWorks Home Entertainment released two best-of sets entitled "Michael J. Fox – His All Time Favorites" Vols. 1 and 2 in 2003, each containing 11 episodes. All 22 episodes are taken from the four seasons containing Fox, each starting with a brief interview in which he describes what he likes about the episode. In the 2003 interviews, Fox shows symptoms of his ongoing illness. Both DVD boxes contain bonus material with fund-raising TV commercials for Parkinson's disease research, starring the Spin City cast.

DVD name	Ep #	Release date
The Complete First Season	24	November 4, 2008
The Complete Second Season	24	April 28, 2009
The Complete Third Season	26	November 3, 2009
The Complete Fourth Season	26	February 15, 2011
The Complete Fifth Season	23	August 16, 2011
The Complete Sixth and Final Season	22	December 13, 2011
