= The Least Among You =

- Directed by: Mark Young
- Written by: Mark Young
- Produced by: Julia Verdin, Mark Young
- Starring: Cedric Sanders; Lauren Holly; Louis Gossett Jr.
- Release date: January 21, 2009 (Palm Springs)
- Running time: 97 minutes
- Country: United States
- Language: English

The Least Among You is a film based on the true story of Presbyterian Rev. Dr. Charles Marks' formative years, written and directed by first time writer/director Mark Young. It explores issues of self-determination in the face of systemic racial persecution in the United States in the mid-1960s.

== Plot ==
In the opening minutes of the film, Richard Kelly (played by Cedric Sanders), is behind bars, having been arrested during the infamous Watts Riots for allegedly assaulting a police officer. Though he maintains that he is innocent, Kelly is convicted. At his sentencing he is presented with a choice between serving jail time and serving probation for one year as a student at an all-white Christian theological seminary.

Kelly faces overt hostility from his fellow students and confusion over his place in the school from the faculty. He has the support and encouragement from the President of the Seminary (played by William Devane), up until he begins to attempt to introduce institutional changes which would lead to further racial integration of the student body and inclusion of racial minorities on the faculty. At that point, the President turns against him, fearing the loss of funding from the seminary's benefactors.

As his situation at the seminary worsens, Kelly seeks out the advice and counsel of the groundskeeper, Sam (Louis Gossett Jr.). Sam places his own job in jeopardy by supporting Kelly's attempts at institutional change. Though his employment is terminated for a time, he is eventually reinstated. Kelly's project to integrate the student body and the faculty is successful, and he decides to remain at the seminary even after his probationary period ended.

== Cast ==
- Louis Gossett Jr. as Samuel Benton
- Starletta DuPois as Mrs. Benton
- Lauren Holly as Kate Allison
- William Devane as Alan Beckett
- Cedric Sanders as Richard Kelly
- Siena Goines as Ruth Kelly

== Production ==
Principal photography began in December 2007, in Los Angeles.

== Home video ==
The Least Among You was released on DVD on August 24, 2010 by Lionsgate Home Entertainment. and the Cinequest Film Festival. Cedric Sanders won the Best Actor Award at the 2009 San Diego Black Film Festival for his role in The Least Among You.

The Least Among You did not capture the attention of the public or the critics to any significant degree. Neither of the major movie review aggregators, Rotten Tomatoes and Metacritic contains an entry.
