= The Jimmy Show =

2001 film by Frank Whaley

- Directed by: Frank Whaley
- Written by: Frank Whaley
- Based on: Veins and Thumbtacks by Jonathan Marc Sherman
- Produced by: Beni Tadd Atoori; Mary Jane Skalski
- Starring: Frank Whaley; Carla Gugino; Ethan Hawke
- Cinematography: Michael Mayers
- Edited by: Miran Miosic
- Music by: Georg Brandl Egloff
- Distributed by: First Look Studios
- Release dates: September 13, 2001 (Toronto International Film Festival); December 13, 2002
- Running time: 96 minutes
- Country: United States
- Language: English

The Jimmy Show is a 2001 drama film written and directed by Frank Whaley, based on the Off-Broadway play Veins and Thumbtacks by Jonathan Marc Sherman. The film stars Whaley, Carla Gugino, and Ethan Hawke. The film premiered at the 2001 Toronto International Film Festival and also screened at the 2002 Sundance Film Festival.

== Synopsis ==
The film centers on the life of Jimmy O'Brien, a warehouse clerk by day and a standup comedian by night. He is also a failure as an inventor. He lives with his wife, daughter, and a disabled grandmother. Jimmy's aspiration to succeed contrasts sharply with the numbness of his pothead friend Ray, who is just trying to get by. When performing, Jimmy contradicts the role of a comedian and instead uses the stand-up form to relate the tragedies in his life, which causes indifferent to hostile reactions from the audience; however, he also provokes members of the audience. Eventually, Jimmy is fired from his day job for stealing beer, which he abuses, and his wife finally leaves him and takes their daughter. He winds up working at a Middle Eastern fast-food restaurant. At the end of the film, Jimmy runs seemingly aimlessly in different directions in what appears to be him either on the verge of a nervous breakdown or spiritual awakening.

== Cast ==
- Frank Whaley as Jimmy O'Brien
- Carla Gugino as Annie O'Brien
- Ethan Hawke as Ray
- Lynn Cohen as Ruth
- Jillian Stacom as Wendy
- Spelman M. Beaubrun as Claude
- Sheila Kay Davis as Social Worker

== Production ==
The film was shot in Staten Island, the same location used by Frank Whaley in his 1999 drama Joe the King.
