= Wendy Wilkins =

American academic administrator

Wendy Wilkins (born March 1, 1949) was provost and executive vice president at New Mexico State University until November 2012. She took the post in mid-July 2010 after resigning from the University of North Texas at the end of business day, July 1, 2010. Prior to beginning her service as the University of North Texas Provost and Vice President for Academic Affairs in 2007, Wilkins has served as Dean of the College of Arts and Letters at Michigan State University and as Associate Dean for Academic Personnel in the College of Liberal Arts and Sciences at Arizona State University. Her work in academic administration began with service as Associate Chair, and then Chair, of the Department of English at ASU.

== Education ==
Wilkins’ academic preparation, in Linguistics, includes a PhD from the University of California at Los Angeles, two post-doctoral appointments in Cognitive Science at the University of California at Irvine, and a pre-doctoral appointment in the Department of Linguistics and Philosophy at MIT.

== Employment and research ==
Wilkins' primary research training was in syntactic theory; more recently she has worked on the evolutionary neurobiology of language and comparative linguistic and musical cognition. As a faculty member, Wilkins has held numerous positions both in the United States and in Mexico. In the U.S., in addition to ASU and MSU, she has served in a visiting capacity at the University of Massachusetts Amherst and at the University of Washington. In Mexico City, she was a professor of Linguistics at Universidad Autónoma Metropolitana, Unidad Ixtapalapa; Centro de Estudios Lingüísticos y Literarios, El Colegio de México; and Departamento de Lingüística, Escuela Nacional de Antropología e Historia. She also held a research position at Instituto de Investigaciones en Matemáticas Applicadas y en Sistemas, Universidad Nacional Autónoma de México.

Since becoming an administrator, Wilkins has remained involved in service to the profession. She engaged actively with the Council of Colleges of Arts and Sciences, including service on the Board of Directors. Within Linguistics, she was elected delegate-at-large for Section Z (Linguistics and Language Science) of the American Association for the Advancement of Science (AAAS) and has accepted numerous service assignments for the Linguistic Society of America (LSA).

== Administrative professional activities ==
National and state

- 2009–Presenter, Panel on Cost Containment and Enhancing Effectiveness, Council on Academic Affairs Summer Meeting, Association of Public and Land-grant Universities (APLU)
- 2008-09 - Participant, Institute for New Chief Academic Officers, American Council on Education (ACE)
- 2002-04 - Member, Board of Directors, Boar’s Head Theatre, Lansing, Michigan
- 2002 - Chair, Workshop for Assistant and Associate Deans, Council of Colleges of Arts and Sciences (CCAS)
- 2002 - Co-Chair, Program Committee, Annual Meeting of Arts and Sciences Deans, Association of American Universities (AAU), Berkeley, CA
- 2001-04 - Member, Board of Directors, East Lansing Film Festival
- 2001 - Organizer, Panel on Budgeting, Annual Meeting of Arts and Sciences Deans, AAU, Tucson, AZ
- 2000-03 - Member, Board of Directors, CCAS
- 2000 - Member, External Review Team, Departments of Modern Languages and Literatures and Language Media Center, University of Iowa
- 2000 - Participant, Re-Envisioning the PhD Project, University of Washington. Project funded by the Pew Charitable Trusts and the Council of Graduate Schools; project directors at the University of Washington, with invited participation of others
- 2000 - Organizer, Case Studies Session, Annual Meeting, CCAS
- 2000 - Member, Program Committee, CCAS
- 1999-2004 - Participant, Imagining America/Imagining Michigan. Project conceived and developed out of White House Millennium Council, with leadership provided by University of Michigan and the Woodrow Wilson Foundation, with invited participation of others
- 1999–Presenter, Dean’s Clinic (Large Institutions), Annual Meeting, CCAS
- 1999-2000 - Member, Committee on the Internationalization of Education, CCAS
- 1998-2004 - Member, Arts and Sciences Deans Group, Committee on Institutional Cooperation (CIC). The CIC comprises the Big Ten universities plus the University of Illinois at Chicago and the University of Chicago.
- 1998-2004 - Member, Arts and Sciences Deans Group, AAU Public Institutions
- 1996-1999 - Member, Resolutions Committee, CCASS. Developed two resolutions, both adopted by CCAS at the 1996 annual meeting, on fair and appropriate use of electronic communications technologies.
- 1996-98 - Founder, Arizona Council of Arts and Sciences Administrators (ACASA). ACASA includes the arts and sciences deans, associate deans, and assistant deans from the Arizona state universities (ASU, UA, NAU).
- 1996 - Panel Chair, CCAS. Panel on information technologies (including technology transfer, the Avirtual@ university, and evaluating technology innovations for personnel reviews)
- 1995–Presenter, CCAS. Panel addressing partner accommodation issues in faculty hiring.
- 1995 - Panel Chair, Association of Departments of English, Summer Seminar. Workshop for newly appointed English department chairs.
- 1992 - Chair, Host Committee, Association of Departments of English, Summer Seminar

Michigan State University (1998–2004)

- 2001-04 - Member, Board of Directors, Estate Wealth and Strategies Institute. One of three deans appointed to Board of non-profit institute focusing on inter-generational wealth transfer issues.
- 2001-04 - Member, Board of Directors, Michigan State University Alumni Association. One of two deans who serve on the Association Board, along with elected MSU alumni and other ex-officio members from University central administration.
- 2001-04 - Member, Selection Committee, University Distinguished Professorships. The UDP is MSU’s highest internal honor for an individual faculty members
- 2001-04 - Member, Enrollment Strategy Council. One of three deans on advisory committee working with Director of Admissions.
- 2000-04 - Member, Executive Advisory Committee, Executive Development Center. One of six on-campus members of committee to serve in advisory capacity.
- 1999-2003 - Member, Campaign Strategy Committee (Office of the Provost and University Development). Committee of six deans plus members of the central administration and University Development, involved in developing policies and procedures for MSU’s billion-dollar-plus (sesquicentennial) capital campaign
- 1999-2000 - Chair, Steering Committee, Center for Great Lakes Culture
- 1999-2000 - Member, Planning Committee, Academic Leadership Program
- 1999-2004 - Member, Jewish Studies Program Advisory Board
- 1998-2004 - Lead Dean, Integrative Studies Program. Integrative Studies is the core curriculum in general education at MSU
- 1998-2004 - Member, Study Abroad Deans Group. On-campus committee, advisory to the Dean of International Studies and Programs
- 1998-2004 - Member, Campus Cultural Coordinating Committee
- 1998-99 - Member, MSU Team, Wharton/IRHE Program for the Knight Collaborative, The Wharton School, University of Pennsylvania. Team composed of two deans and four other academic leaders; team project focused on collaborative work

Arizona State University (1987–1997)

- 1997-98 - Member, Workforce for the University for the Next Century Project Team. Task force charged with revisioning Human Resources in the University
- 1997 - Member, Search Committee, Director of Faculty Development Program
- 1997-98 - Member, Advisory Network, Employee Career Enrichment Program
- 1996-98 - Member, Main Campus Information Technology Strategic Planning Committee. Committee charged to address both strategic and implementation plans for Information Technology
- 1996-98 - Member, Provost’s Working Group on Diversity
- 1995-98 - Chair, University Information Technology Advisory Committee. Committee advisory to Vice Provost for Information Technology.
- 1995-98 - Member, Employee Assistance Program Advisory Committee. Committee advisory to EAP Program Director.
- 1995-98 - Facilitator, Associate and Assistant Deans Council. Program to coordinate on-campus professional development activities for assistant and associate deans
- 1995-96 - Member, Human Resources Oversight Committee. Committee charged with on-campus review of human resources office.
- 1995-96 - Vice President, Board of Directors, University Club
- 1995 - Member, Coordinating Team, Student Process Re-engineering Project. SPRP was the University-level project with the fundamental goal of improving services to students; Wilkins was the Academic Affairs representative
- 1994-98 - Chair, Strategic Planning and Academic Resources Advisory Committee. Committee responsibilities included advising the Dean on both short- and long-term priorities and writing and revising the College strategic plan.
- 1994-1997 - Member, Chicana and Chicano Studies Advisory Committee. Chicana/o Studies, a new degree program and department, gained Regents’ approval in 1997.
- 1994 - Member, Main Campus Strategic Budgeting Committee. Subcommittee of the Main Campus Strategic Planning Committee.
- 1994 - Member, Preparing Future Faculty project. Graduate student training for the future professoriate; project directed by the Graduate College and funded by the Pew Foundation and the Council of Graduate Schools.
- 1994 - Member, Selection Committee, Legislative Intern Program
- 1994 - Member, University Summer Bridge Program Committee. Committee charged with developing programs to ease transition for marginally prepared high school students becoming first-year ASU students.
- 1994-95 - Member, Commission on New Student Orientation. Committee charged with developing a plan to improve orientation activities.
- 1994-95 - Member, Killer Course Task Force. Task force charged with determining which lower division courses were obstacles to student success, especially first- to second-year persistence.
- 1994-95 - Member, University Strategic Planning Committee for Mathematical Sciences. Committee charged with developing a plan to improve student learning and satisfaction in lower division mathematics.
- 1994 - Member, Search Committee, Humanities Computing Facility director
- 1992-1996 - Member, Board of Directors, University Club
- 1992-93 - Chair, Task Force on Quality and Diversity. College-level subcommittee of University task force charged with developing a plan for enhancing quality and diversity among the students and faculty.
- 1992-93 - Member, Search Committee, Dean of the College of Extended Education
- 1990-92 - Member, CLAS Strategic Planning Committee
- 1988-90 - Chair, CLAS Student Affairs and Grievances Committee
- 1987-89 - Chair, University Interdisciplinary Committee on Adaptive Neural Systems

== Publications ==
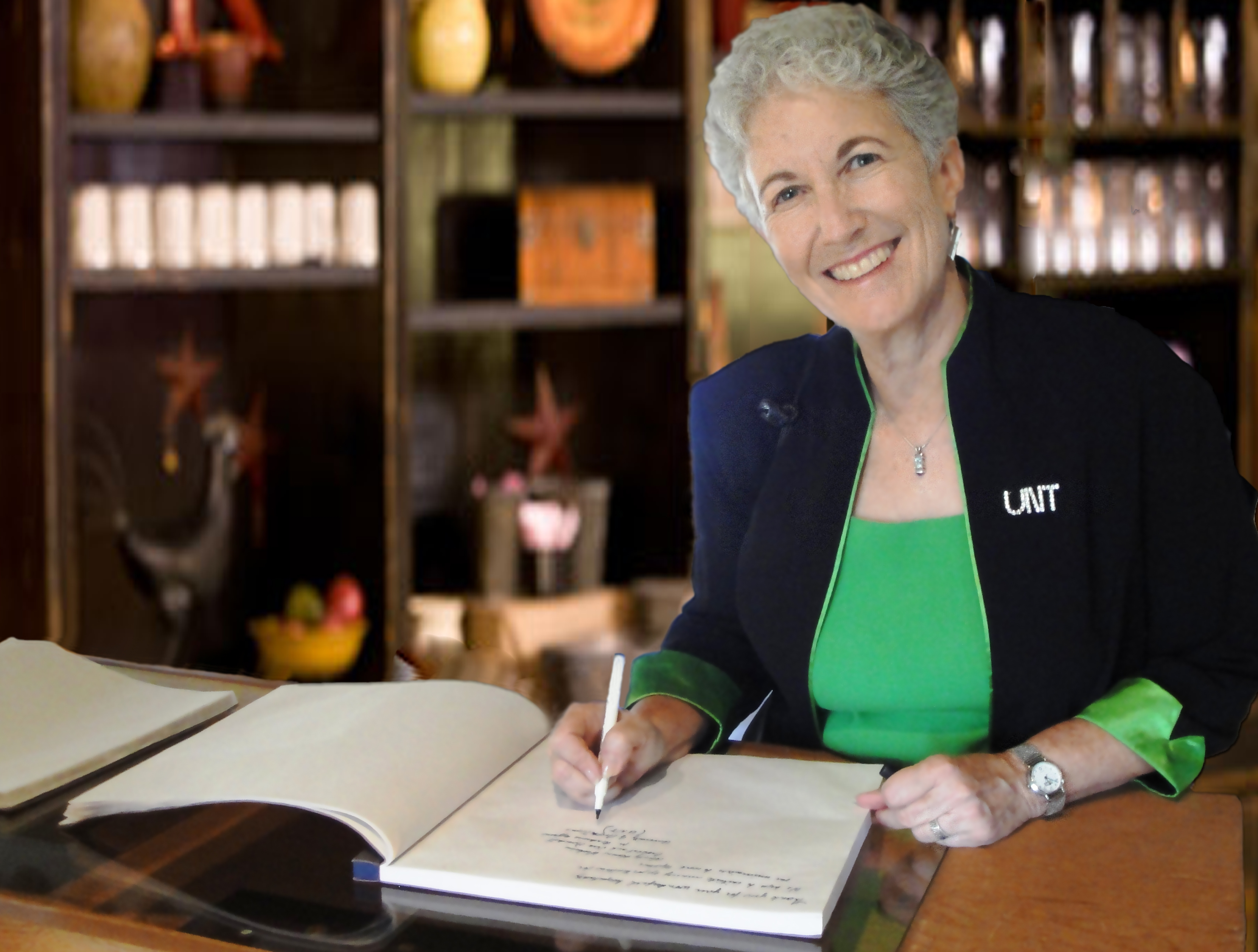
Wendy Wilkins at a book signing

Books

- 2007 - Phrasal and clausal architecture: Syntactic derivation and interpretation, Amsterdam: John Benjamins (Editor, with S. Karimi and V. Samiian).
- 1988 - Thematic Relations, Syntax and Semantics, Vol. 21. New York: Academic Press (Editor).
- 1984 - Locality in Linguistic Theory, New York: Academic Press (with P. Culicover).

Refereed Publications

- 2010 - Toward an evolutionary biology of language through comparative neuroanatomy, in The Oxford Handbook of Language Evolution, Maggie Tallerman and Kathleen Gibson (editors), Oxford University Press, in press.
- 2009 - Mosaic neurobiology and anatomical plausibility, in The Prehistory of Language, Rudolph Botha and Chris Knight (editors), Oxford University Press, pp. 390–420.
- 2007 - Layers, mosaic pieces, and tiers, The Linguistic Review, 24(4):475–484.
- 2007 - Conceptual space. In Karimi, S., Samiian, V., and Wilkins, W.K. (Eds.), Phrasal and clausal architecture: Syntactic derivation and interpretation, Amsterdam: John Benjamins, pp. 365–395 (with J. Wakefield).
- 2005 - Anatomy matters, The Linguistic Review, 22(2-4):271-288.
- 1998 - El lexicón posminimista y las construcciones con se en español y macedonio. In De Báez, Y.J., Venier, M.E., Butragueño, P.M., and Barriga Villanueva, R. (Eds.), Volume to commemorate the 50th anniversary of the Centro de Estudios Lingüísticos y Literarios, El Colegio de México, pp. 143–163 (with V. Todoroska and C. Agüero Bautista).
- 1997 - Further issues in neurolinguistic preconditions, Behavioral and Brain Sciences, 19(4):788-798 (with J. Wakefield).
- 1997 - El lexicón posminimista: el caso de se. In Pool, M. (Ed.), Estudios de lingúística formal, El Colegio de México, pp. 67–86.
- 1995 - Issues and non-issues in the origins of language (reply to commentary), Behavioral and Brain Sciences, 18(1):205-226 (with J. Wakefield).
- 1995 - Brain evolution and neurolinguistic preconditions, Behavioral and Brain Sciences, 18(1):161-182 (with J. Wakefield).
- 1994 - Lexical learning by error detection, Language Acquisition, 3(2):121-157.
- 1991 - Autonomy and the nature of the input, Behavioral and Brain Sciences, 14(4):638.
- 1990 - In defense of exaptation, Behavioral and Brain Sciences, 13(4):763-764 (with J. Dumford).
- 1989 - Linguistics, learnability, and computation. In Brink, J.R. and Haden, C.R. (Eds.), The Computer and the Brain: Perspectives on Human and Artificial Intelligence, Amsterdam: Elsevier North-Holland, 197-207.
- 1989 - Why degree-0/?, Behavioral and Brain Sciences, 12(2):362-363.
- 1988 - Linguistics and the teaching of science, in Linguistics in the Undergraduate Curriculum, Linguistic Society of America (position paper).
- 1988 - Thematic structure and reflexivization, in Wilkins, W.K. (Ed.), Thematic Relations, New York: Academic Press, 191-213.
- 1987 - On the linguistic function of event roles, in Grammar and Cognition, Berkeley Linguistics Society, 460-472.
- 1987 - On the learnability of the scope of reflexivization, Proceedings of the Sixth Annual West Coast Conference on Formal Linguistics, (WCCFL VI), 317-327.
- 1986 - Control, PRO, and the Projection Principle, Language, 62(2):120-153 (with P. Culicover).
- 1986 - El sintagma nominal de infinitivo, Revista Argentina de Lingüística, 2(2):209-229.
- 1981 - On the nonnecessity of the Locality Principle, Linguistic Analysis, 8(2):111-144.
- 1980 - Adjacency and variables in syntactic transformations, Linguistic Inquiry, 11(4):709-758.
- 1977 - Wh-fronting and the Variable Interpretation Convention, Proceedings of the Seventh Annual Meeting of the Northeastern Linguistics Society, MIT, 365-381.
- 1975 - Strategies in constructing a definite description: some evidence from KinyaRwanda, Studies in African Linguistics, 6 (2):151-169 (with A. Kimenyi).

Book reviews

- 2006 - Review of The Birth of the Mind, by Gary Marcus, Language, Vol. 82, No. 4, 921-924.
- 1992 - Review of Lexical Semantics Without Thematic Roles, by Yael Ravin, Journal of Linguistics, Vol. 28, No. 1, 241-250.
- 1988 - Review of The Mind's New Science by Howard Gardner, Annals of the History of Computing, Vol. 10, No. 1, 89-93.
- 1983 - Review of Approaches to Island Phenomena by Alexander Grosu, Language, Vol. 59, No. 4, 902-905

Recent Academic Presentations

- 2008 - Biological plausibility and comparative anatomy, paper presented at the Annual Meeting, Linguistic Society of America, Chicago
- 2008 - Language in the light of evolution, Symposium organized and presented (with James Hurford, University of Edinburgh) at the 2008 Annual Meeting, Linguistic Society of America, Chicago
