= Julia Verdin =

British film writer and director

Octavia Julia Verdin is a British independent film writer, director, producer and founder of Rough Diamond Productions, established in 1993. She has produced over 36 feature films and is best known for Stander, starring Thomas Jane, The Merchant of Venice (2004), starring Al Pacino, Jeremy Irons and Joseph Fiennes, and 2 Jacks, starring Sienna Miller and Danny Houston. She recently made her mark as a social impact film director, raising awareness on key issues like child trafficking, domestic abuse, and addiction. Her film Angie: Lost Girls, starring Olivia d'Abo, Dylan Sprayberry and Jane Widdop, won a number of awards at notable film festivals.

Verdin served as a director on the board of BAFTA (British Academy of Film and Television Arts) for 10 years. In 2015, she received The Executive Achievement Award from the La Femme International Film Festival.

== Early life ==
Verdin was born in Beaconsfield, England, and brought up in Oxford. She received an MA in film with distinction from Staffordshire University.

== Books ==
• 2015: Success in Film: A Guide to Funding, Filming and Finishing Independent Films

== Filmography ==
| Year | Title | Director | Writer | Producer |
|---|---|---|---|---|
| 2023 | No Address | Yes | Yes | Yes |
| 2022 | Maya | Yes | Yes | Yes |
| 2020 | Angie: Lost Girls | Yes | Yes | Yes |
| 2016 | Lost Girls | Yes | Yes | Yes |

Producer only

- Death on the Border (2022)
- The Unwilling (2016)
- The Ninth Cloud (2014)
- 2 Jacks (2012)
- The Least Among You (2009)
- Stander (2003)
- Styx (2001)
- Contaminated Man (2000)
- Detour (1998)
- Matter of Trust (1998)
- Perfect Assassins (1998)
- The Set Up (1995)
- Temptation (1994)

Executive producer

- Ghost Divers (2023)
- Born of War (2013)
- The Merchant of Venice (2004) (Co-Executive Producer)
- Past Perfect(1996)
- Open Window (1989)
- Zits (1988)

Co-producer

- Senior Skip Day (2008)
- Slipstream (2005)
- Blast (2004)
- Riding the Bullet (2004)
- Consequence (2003)
- I Witness (2003)
- Pavement (2002)
- Greenmail (2002)
- Lone Hero (2002)
- The Shipment (2001)
- Ballad of the Nightingale (1999)

Associate producer

- Lady Godiva (2008)
- Dracula 3000 (2004)
- In Pursuit (2000)
