= New York City Serenade (film) =

- Official poster
- Directed by: Frank Whaley
- Written by: Frank Whaley
- Produced by: Laird Adamson; James Koya Jones
- Starring: Freddie Prinze Jr.; Chris Klein; Jamie-Lynn Sigler; Heather Bucha; Alexander Chaplin; Wallace Shawn
- Cinematography: Ryan Samul
- Edited by: Miran Miosic
- Music by: Ed Harcourt
- Production company: IKM Productions
- Distributed by: Anchor Bay Entertainment
- Release dates: September 13, 2007 (TIFF); March 24, 2009 (DVD)
- Running time: 103 minutes
- Country: United States
- Language: English
- Budget: $1.8 million
- Box office: $2,509

New York City Serenade is a 2007 American comedy-drama film written and directed by Frank Whaley and starring Freddie Prinze Jr., Chris Klein and Jamie-Lynn Sigler alongside Heather Bucha, Alexander Chaplin and Wallace Shawn. The film takes its title from the Bruce Springsteen song of the same name from 1973, and follows two childhood friends (Prinze and Klein) who attend a film festival in Kansas amidst their separate personal crises.

New York City Serenade premiered at the 2007 Toronto International Film Festival on September 13, 2007, and was released direct-to-video by Anchor Bay Entertainment on March 24, 2009. The film was panned by critics.

== Plot ==
Owen is an aspiring filmmaker who has been nominated for an award for one of his short films in which his friend Ray appears. Owen has a job developing photos in the film industry. Ray has an office job (this week) but still plays drums in a rock band, and he has a young daughter, Francie, as well as a drinking problem. Owen is engaged to Lynn.

Owen and Lynn go out to a film, where they meet Lynn's French literature professor Noam. Then they catch the end of one of the performances of Ray's band. Owen wants to continue the date with Lynn afterward, but Ray persuades Owen by asking for help moving his drums. Ray and Owen then wind up going to Bertrand's party where Owen and Rachel end up in bed.

Owen, Ray, and two of their friends are asked to serve as pallbearers when the father of their friend Matt dies in New Jersey. While Owen is out of town, Lynn and Rachel meet, and Lynn learns the truth about what Owen and Rachel did. Lynn wants to break up with Owen.

Owen takes Ray to the film festival where he hopes to win an award for his short film. When they arrive, their driver Les is supposed to take them to the airport motel, but Ray saw Wallace Shawn and found out he was staying at the Four Seasons. Ray and Owen go to the Four Seasons and Ray overhears that Shawn's son will be late, so Ray claims to be Shawn's son, and gets himself and Owen a nice room. At the festival, Owen does not win anything. After returning to the hotel, their scheme has been discovered and they are kicked out. Owen repeatedly calls Lynn trying to make up with her, but she never answers and the two are never again shown together. In Lynn's last scene, she is getting ready to go on a date with Noam.

At the end of the movie, some time has passed, Ray has straightened his life out, he has a good job, and he has a good relationship with his daughter. Owen has produced a successful television commercial.

== Cast ==
- Freddie Prinze Jr. as Owen
- Chris Klein as Ray
- Jamie-Lynn Sigler as Lynn
- Heather Bucha as Mary
- Alexander Chaplin as Terry
- Ben Schwartz as Russ
- Christopher DeBlasio as Ben
- Sebastian Roché as Noam Broder
- Wallace Shawn as himself
- Frank Whaley as Les
- Emma Bell as Melinda
- Diana Gettinger as Rachel
- Jeff Skowron as Matt

== Reception ==
On the review aggregator website Rotten Tomatoes, 8% of 13 critics' reviews are positive.

Nathan Lee of The New York Times gave the film a negative review, calling it "transparently banal." Kyle Smith of the New York Post gave it a similar review, criticizing Whaley's direction and calling the film "one of those pointless indies that you’ll have forgotten before the credits roll."

David Nusair of Reel Film Reviews gave the film a positive review, praising Prinze and Klein's lead performances and calling the film "well-intentioned," although he criticized its "egregiously uneven structure."
