= No Address (film) =

- Film poster
- Directed by: Julia Verdin
- Written by: Julia Verdin; James J. Papa
- Produced by: Robert Craig; Sally Forcier; Angela Lujan; Jennifer Stolo; Julia Verdin
- Starring: William Baldwin; Ashanti; Xander Berkeley; Beverly D'Angelo; Ty Pennington; Lucas Jade Zumann; Kristanna Loken; Patricia Velásquez
- Cinematography: Peter Holland
- Edited by: Alejandro Guimoye
- Music by: Paul Mills; Zack Leffew
- Production company: Robert Craig Films
- Release date: February 28, 2025
- Running time: 106 minutes
- Country: United States
- Language: English

No Address is a 2025 American drama film written by Julia Verdin and James J. Papa, directed by Verdin and starring William Baldwin.

== Synopsis ==
A group of people who unexpectedly become homeless form an odd family, battling to survive on the streets while avoiding a bullying gang, a harsh community, and local authorities.

== Cast ==
- William Baldwin as Robert
- Ashanti as Violet
- Xander Berkeley as Harris
- Beverly D'Angelo as Dora
- Ty Pennington as Mr. Mills
- Lucas Jade Zumann as Jimmy
- Kristanna Loken as Kim
- Patricia Velásquez as Gabrielle
- Isabella Ferreira as Lauren
- Keenan Moran as Sam

== Production ==
The film was shot in Sacramento in early 2023. Filming began February 22 and wrapped on March 22. Scenes were filmed in Sacramento neighborhoods including Del Paso Heights, Midtown, Land Park, Oak Park, Hollywood Park and Nimbus Overlook. Some scenes were also filmed in Folsom and Auburn.

== Release ==
The film was released on February 28, 2025.

== Reception ==
Rotten Tomatoes has a positive audience rating of 96%.
