= Alexander Chaplin =

American actor

- Born: Alexander Gaberman; March 20, 1971 (age 55); New York City, New York, U.S.
- Other name: Sandy Chaplin
- Occupation: Actor
- Years active: 1992–present
- Spouse: Daisy Chaplin
- Children: 2

Alexander Chaplin (né Gaberman; born March 20, 1971) is an American actor. Chaplin's most prominent role was that of speechwriter James Hobert on the sitcom Spin City.

As with the rest of the Spin City main cast, Chaplin has featured in creator Bill Lawrence's subsequent sitcom, Scrubs, playing a drug addict who tries to trick Elliot into giving him prescription medication in "My Moment of Un-Truth" and later tricks Jordan into giving him money in "My Rite of Passage". His character later appeared in "My Scrubs" as a drugs counsellor for the hospital, claiming to be reformed.

== Personal life ==
Chaplin is the son of a jazz musician and a novelist. As a teen, Chaplin attended Stagedoor Manor Performing Arts Training Center in upstate New York. He and his wife, Daisy, producer Harold Prince's daughter, changed their surnames to Chaplin, his mother-in-law's maiden name.

== Filmography ==
=== Film ===
Year	Title	Role
1995	The Basketball Diaries	Bobo
1999	30 Days	Mike Charles
2002	Alma Mater	William Anderson
2003	All Grown Up	
2004	Dog Gone Love	Steven Merritt
2005	Confessions of a Dog	
2006	The Wedding Weekend	Ted
2007	New York City Serenade	Terry
2008	Cop Dog	Barry
2013	Syrup	Paul
2014	Wish I Was Here	Rabbi Rosenburg
2019	The Report	
2019	The Assistant	Max

=== Television ===
Year	Title	Role	Notes
1992	ABC Afterschool Specials	Spinner	Episode: "Summer Stories: The Mall"
1993	Homicide: Life on the Street	Johnny	Episode: "Gone for Goode"
1996-2000	Spin City	James Hobert	Main Cast (100 Episodes)
2003	Law & Order	Tim Schwimmer	Episode: "Bodies"
2004-2007	Scrubs	Sam Thompson	Recurring Role (3 Episodes)
2007	Numb3rs	Austin Parker	Episode: "Democracy"
2009	The Hustler	Referee	Episode: "Hustle and Throw"
2009	Ugly Betty	Fabian	Episode: "Sisters on the Verge of a Nervous Breakdown"
2013	The Good Wife	Arthur Schumacher	Episode: "Red Team, Blue Team"
2013	Shake It Up!	Sergei	Episode: "Clean It Up"
2013	Ray Donovan	Father Flannery	Episode: "Bridget"
2013	The Neighbours	Tad Hollander	Episode: "Challoweenukah"
2015	Silicon Valley	Venture Capitalist	Episode: "Sand Hill Shuffle"
2015	Scorpion	Simon	Episode: "Cliffhanger"
2015	Madam Secretary	Chad Sorenson	Episode: "Waiting for Taleju"
2016	Elementary	Davis Potter	Episode: "Ain't Nothing Like the Real Thing"
2017	Kevin Can Wait	Stuart	Episode: "Neighborhood Watch"
2017	Chicago P.D.	Dr. Lewis Macy	Episode: "Monster"
2018	Blue Bloods	Mickey Cardoza	Episode: "Close Calls"
2019	Blindspot	Garret Young	Episode: "Though this be Madness, Yet there is Method In't"
2022–2024	Pretty Little Liars	Steve Bowers	6 episodes
