= Frank Whaley =

American actor (born 1963)

- Born: Frank Joseph Whaley; July 20, 1963 (age 63); Syracuse, New York, U.S.
- Education: University at Albany, SUNY
- Occupations: Actor, film director, screenwriter, comedian
- Years active: 1987–present
- Spouse: Heather Bucha (m. 2001)

Frank Joseph Whaley (born July 20, 1963) is an American actor, film director and screenwriter. His roles include Brett in Pulp Fiction, Robby Krieger in The Doors, Jim Dodge in Career Opportunities, young Archie "Moonlight" Graham in Field of Dreams, and Guy in Swimming with Sharks. He has also appeared in films and TV series such as Born on the Fourth of July, The Freshman, A Midnight Clear, Swing Kids, Broken Arrow, Luke Cage, Red Dragon and World Trade Center.

== Early life ==
Whaley was born and raised in Syracuse, New York, the son of Robert W. Whaley Sr. and Josephine (née Timilione). Whaley graduated from Anthony A. Henninger High School in 1981 and left home at 18. He graduated from the University at Albany.

== Career ==
Whaley made his film debut in 1987's Ironweed. In 1989, he appeared in Field of Dreams and Born on the Fourth of July. The latter film began a long collaboration with director Oliver Stone, including 1991's The Doors, in which he played Robby Krieger, JFK, which was released the same year, in which he played a conspirator in the JFK assassination and 2006's World Trade Center, where he played Chuck Sereika, a former drug addict who helped in the rescue efforts. In 1990, Whaley appeared with Marlon Brando and Matthew Broderick in The Freshman. In 1991, he starred in the John Hughes feature film Career Opportunities.

Over the next two years, he played supporting roles in movies such as Hoffa and Swing Kids. He appeared in his second leading film role in 1994's Swimming with Sharks. During the same year, he played a supporting role as the doomed Brett, who was memorably killed by Samuel L. Jackson's and John Travolta's characters in Pulp Fiction.

In 1998, he started a regular role on the short-lived CBS series Buddy Faro. He also appeared in episodes of The Dead Zone, Law & Order, and its spinoff Law & Order: Criminal Intent.

Whaley made his writing-directorial debut in his independent film Joe the King in 1999, featuring his Doors co-star Val Kilmer and longtime friend and colleague Ethan Hawke in starring roles. The film premiered at the Sundance Film Festival and earned Whaley the Waldo Salt Screenwriting Award. His second film as writer and director, The Jimmy Show, stars Whaley and Carla Gugino. This film also premiered at the Sundance Film Festival.

Whaley's third film as writer and director, New York City Serenade, starring Chris Klein and Freddie Prinze Jr., premiered at the 2007 Toronto International Film Festival. He stars as the villain in the 2007 horror film Vacancy. In 2014 he wrote and directed the film Like Sunday, Like Rain, starring Debra Messing, Leighton Meester and Billie Joe Armstrong. The film won six awards at the 2014 Williamsburg Independent Film Festival including Best Film, Best Director and acting nods for Armstrong, Meester, Messing and Julian Shatkin. It opened in March 2015.

In 2014, Whaley appeared as Van Miller in Season One of the Showtime series Ray Donovan. In 2016, Whaley had a role in Paramount Animation's first mostly live-action film, Monster Trucks, and in 2017, he appeared in the teen film The Outskirts.

Whaley's other film credits include Red Dragon, Rob the Mob, School of Rock, Broken Arrow, Little Monsters, A Midnight Clear, Janie Jones and I.Q. among others.

His television credits include Gotham, The Blacklist, CSI, Curb Your Enthusiasm, Psych, Burn Notice, Ugly Betty, Mrs. Harris, When Trumpets Fade, Boston Legal, Blue Bloods, Bull, House, MacGyver, Divorce, Elementary, Under the Dome, the TV mini-series Madoff, Alcatraz and many others.

Whaley has maintained his roots in the theater, working frequently with The New Group in New York City. In 2011, he appeared in The New Group's revival of Wallace Shawn's Marie And Bruce opposite Marisa Tomei.

== Personal life ==
In 2001, Whaley married Heather Bucha Whaley, an actress and writer, and the author of Eat Your Feelings: Recipes for Self-Loathing.

== Filmography ==
=== As director ===
Year	Title
1999	Joe the King
2001	The Jimmy Show
2007	New York City Serenade
2014	Like Sunday, Like Rain

=== Film roles ===
Year	Title	Role	Notes
1987	Ironweed	Young Francis Phelan	
1989	Field of Dreams	Archie "Moonlight" Graham	
1989	Little Monsters	Boy	
1989	Born on the Fourth of July	Timmy Burns	
1990	The Freshman	Steve Bushak	
1990	Cold Dog Soup	Michael Latchmer	
1991	The Doors	Robby Krieger	
1991	Career Opportunities	Jim Dodge	
1991	JFK	Oswald Imposter	Credited in director's cut
1992	Back in the U.S.S.R.	Archer Sloan	
1992	A Midnight Clear	Paul Mundy	
1992	Hoffa	Young Trucker / Hitman	
1993	Swing Kids	Arvid	
1994	Pulp Fiction	Brett	
1994	Swimming with Sharks	Guy	
1994	The Desperate Trail	Walter Cooper	Direct-to-video
1994	I.Q.	Frank	
1995	Homage	Karchie	
1995	Cafe Society	Mickey Jelke	
1996	Broken Arrow	Giles Prentice	
1996	The Winner	Joey	
1997	Retroactive	Brian	
1997	Glam	Franky Syde	
1997	Bombshell	Malcolm Garvey	Direct-to-video
1998	Went to Coney Island on a Mission from God... Be Back by Five	Skee-Ball Weasel	
1998	It All Came True	Brett Conway	
1999	Joe the King	Angry Man Bob Owes	Uncredited
2000	Two Family House	The Narrator	Uncredited
2001	Pursuit of Happiness	Alan	
2001	The Jimmy Show	Jimmy O'Brien	
2001	Chelsea Walls	Lynny Barnum	
2002	Red Dragon	Ralph Mandy	Uncredited
2003	A Good Night to Die	Chad	
2003	School of Rock	Battle of Bands Director	Uncredited
2006	World Trade Center	Chuck Sereika	
2006	The Hottest State	Harris	
2006	Crazy Eights	Brent Sykes	
2006	The System Within	Prison Guard	
2007	Cherry Crush	Wade Chandling	
2007	Vacancy	Mason	
2007	New York City Serenade	Les	
2008	Drillbit Taylor	Interviewed Bodyguards	
2009	The Cell 2	Duncan	Direct-to-video
2010	As Good as Dead	Aaron	
2010	Janie Jones	Chuck	
2013	Aftermath	Eric	Filmed in 2005
2014	Rob the Mob	FBI Agent Frank Hurd	
2016	Cold Moon	Sheriff Ted Hale	
2016	Monster Trucks	Wade Coley	
2017	The Outcasts	Herb	
2017	Against the Night	Detective Ramsey	
2018	Warning Shot	David	
2019	Hustlers	Reese	
2019	Wish Man	Officer Tom Wells	
2019	The Shed	Bane	
2023	Death on the Border	Detective John Watson	
2024	Saint Clare	Mailman Bob	

=== TV roles ===
Year	Title	Role	Notes
1987	Spenser: For Hire	Tommy	Episode: "The Road Back"
1987	CBS Schoolbreak Special	Scott McNichol	Episode: "Soldier Boys"
1987	ABC Afterschool Special	Jeff Dillon	Episode: "Seasonal Differences"
1988	The Equalizer	Press	Episode: "The Child Broker"
1988	Life on the Flipside	Sonny Day	TV pilot
1989	Unconquered	Arnie Woods	TV movie
1989	Flying Blind	Joey	TV movie
1993	Fatal Deception: Mrs. Lee Harvey Oswald	Lee Harvey Oswald	TV movie
1993	To Dance with the White Dog	James	TV movie
1995	The Outer Limits	Henry Marshall	Episode: "The Conversion"
1997	Dead Man's Gun	Cole Ballard	Episode: "My Brother's Keeper
1997	Oddville, MTV	Unknown	1 episode
1998	The Wall	Bishop	TV movie
1998	When Trumpets Fade	Medic Chamberlain	TV movie
1998–2000	Buddy Faro	Bob Jones	Main cast
1999	Shake, Rattle and Roll: An American Love Story	Allen Kogan	TV movie
2000	The Outer Limits	Zig Fowler / Cliff Unger	Episode: "Zig Zag"
2001	Strange Frequency	Unknown	Episode: "Time Is on My Side"
2001	Bad News Mr. Swanson	Unknown	TV pilot
2002	Law & Order	John McDowell	Episode: "Access Nation"
2002	The Twilight Zone	Martin Donnor	Episode: "Future Trade"
2002	Sun Gods	Unknown	TV pilot
2003–2004	The Dead Zone	Christopher Wey / Future Guy	Recurring
2004	Law & Order: Criminal Intent	Mitch Godel	Episode: "Eosphoros"
2004	NCIS	Jeffrey White	Episode: "Chained"
2005	Detective	Brewmaster	TV movie
2005	Mrs. Harris	George Bolen	TV movie
2005	Curb Your Enthusiasm	Peter Hagen	Episode: "Lewis Needs a Kidney"
2006	Where There's a Will	Richie Greene	TV movie
2006	Psych	Robert Dunn	Episode: "Who Ya Gonna Call?"
2007	Boston Legal	Frankie Cox	Episode: "Brotherly Love"
2007	Ruffian	Bill Nack	TV movie
2007	House	Robert Elliot	Episode: "Mirror Mirror"
2008	Law & Order: Special Victims Unit	Navy Commander Grant Marcus	Episode: "PTSD"
2009	CSI: Crime Scene Investigation	Miles	Episode: "Disarmed and Dangerous"
2010	Ugly Betty	Mr. Sparks	Episode: "Blackout!"
2010	Burn Notice	Josh Wagner	Episode: "Breach of Faith"
2012	Alcatraz	Officer Donovan	Episode: "The Ames Brothers"
2012	NYC 22	Larry Giles	Episode: "Firebomb"
2012–2013	Blue Bloods	Gary Heller	2 episodes
2013	Ray Donovan	FBI Agent Van Miller	Recurring
2014	The Blacklist	Karl Hoffman	Episode: "The Good Samaritan"
2014	Gotham	Doug	Episode: "Selina Kyle"
2015	Under the Dome	Dr. Marston	3 episodes
2016	Unforgettable	Jim Garrett	Episode: "We Can Be Heroes"
2016	Madoff	Harry Markopolos	Main cast
2016	Chicago Med	Chuck Gleason	Episode: "Withdrawal"
2016	Elementary	Winston Utz	Episode: "To Catch a Predator Predator"
2016	Divorce	Carson Hodges	Episode: "Gustav"
2016	Empire	Edison Cruz	Episode: "A Furnace for Your Foe"
2016–2018	Marvel's Luke Cage	Detective Rafael Scarfe	Recurring (season 1); Guest (season 2)
2017	MacGyver	Douglas Bishop	Episode: "Fish Scaler"
2017	Bull	Max Hyland	Episode: "Free Fall"
2018	Gone	Ted	Episode: "Secuestrado"
2018	Sneaky Pete	Duane Harding	Episode: "Inside Out"
2018	Deception	Charles Quaid	Episode: "The Unseen Hand"
2019	Jack Ryan	Carl Estes	Episode: "Cargo"
2020	Bull	Ray Peterman	Episode: "Off the Rails"
