= Rules of Engagement season 7 =

Rules of Engagement
- Season 7
- No. of episodes: 13

Release
- Original network: CBS
- Original release: February 4 – May 20, 2013

Season chronology
- ← Previous; Season 6

The seventh and final season of the American television comedy series Rules of Engagement received a 13-episode order on May 21, 2012, and premiered on Monday, February 4, 2013. On May 10, 2013, CBS cancelled Rules of Engagement, stating that the May 20, 2013 season finale would also be the series finale.

== Cast ==
=== Main cast ===
- Patrick Warburton as Jeff Bingham
- Megyn Price as Audrey Bingham
- Oliver Hudson as Adam Rhodes
- Bianca Kajlich as Jennifer Morgan
- David Spade as Russell Dunbar
- Adhir Kalyan as Timmy Patel

=== Recurring cast ===
- Wendi McLendon-Covey as Liz
- Sara Rue as Brenda

== Episodes ==
No. overall	No. in season	Title	Directed by	Written by	Original release date	Prod. code	US viewers (millions)
88	1	"Liz Moves In"	Ted Wass	Dan Kopelman	February 4, 2013	703	9.40
Liz sublets her apartment above the Binghams, which delights Jeff until he learns that she needs a place to stay for a few weeks and Audrey lets Liz move in. Initially uncomfortable with the situation, Jeff changes his tune after Liz constantly harps on Audrey to treat her man better. Adam and Timmy become overly competitive when a table tennis table is installed in the company's break room. Meanwhile, Jennifer is having sex nightmares about Russell.
89	2	"Taking Names"	Ted Wass	Mike Sikowitz	February 11, 2013	706	8.39
When Audrey learns that Russell recently slept with a young woman named Madison, a name she was considering for her baby girl, she asks Russell to list the names of all the women he has had sex with. Thus begins an exhaustive search (with Timmy's help) for a girl's name that has not been "tainted" by Russell. Meanwhile, a simple desire to start bike-riding together with Jennifer has Adam going all-out on an expensive bicycle and gear - embarrassing himself and Jennifer in the process.
90	3	"Cats & Dogs"	Doug Robinson	Christopher Shiple	February 18, 2013	709	8.19
Liz wants to have a baby, and after exhausting all of her options, she turns to a familiar source for help. Timmy receives advice on dating a co-worker from Jeff, who insists he must act like an "alpha dog" to attract the woman. Meanwhile, Adam ruins the wedding dress that Jennifer's mother had shipped to the apartment, and he enlists Audrey's help to have the dress repaired without Jennifer knowing.
91	4	"Cupcake"	Ted Wass	Vanessa McCarthy	February 25, 2013	708	7.89
Jeff eats a cupcake from Adam and Jennifer's apartment - without knowing there is cannabis in it - and suspects he is having a heart attack. Meanwhile, Russell tricks Timmy into accompanying him on his date with a young beauty and her mother.
92	5	"Fountain of Youth"	Ted Wass	Mike Sikowitz	March 4, 2013	707	6.92
When Russell agrees to go with Timmy to a place "to meet some women", it is not what he expected. Jeff's excursion to meet up with his old college buddies also fails to live up to expectations, but Audrey helps him salvage the trip. Meanwhile, Adam tries to coax his new pet cockatoo into doing stunts for a viral internet video.
93	6	"Baby Talk"	Tom Hertz	Tim Doyle	March 11, 2013	701	7.05
Audrey starts talking to Brenda's baby bump in an effort to bond with her unborn daughter, which Jeff thinks is ridiculous. But when he fears that the baby may favor Audrey, Jeff gets into the act. Russell takes an article on the NYC real estate market that Timmy wrote and publishes it in the Wall Street Journal under his own name. In typical Russell fashion, he then uses the ensuing press conference as an opportunity to pick up female reporters. Meanwhile, Adam and Jennifer want to use Russell's beach house in the Bahamas for their honeymoon, but are discouraged when it comes with "conditions."
94	7	"Role Play"	Ted Wass	Lance Whinery	March 18, 2013	705	6.78
Jeff's propensity to procrastinate on or simply forget Audrey's requests has landed him in hot water, so he has to devise an elaborate ruse to keep her from discovering his latest screw-up. Adam tries to get Timmy interested in The Three Stooges, but Timmy fails to see the humor. Meanwhile, Liz confesses to Russell that she is a sex addict. She gets him to join her at a meeting for other addicts, which Russell views as just another opportunity to pick up horny women.
95	8	"Catering"	Tom Hertz	Vanessa McCarthy	March 25, 2013	704	6.30
Brenda is catering a lecture by a visiting author at Columbia University, and has extra passes for Jeff and Audrey to attend. Having been denied acceptance into Columbia many years ago, Audrey desperately wants to show she belongs. But when Brenda's catering help does not show, Audrey has to fill in as a waitress while Jeff tends the bar. Timmy's parents are visiting and he invites only Adam and Jennifer to a dinner with them, deliberately leaving out Russell. But Russell crashes the dinner and impresses Timmy's parents with his politeness and knowledge of Indian culture, while Timmy tries to convince his parents that Russell is not what he appears to be. Meanwhile, Adam tries to prove he can handle highly-pungent Indian food.
96	9	"Cooking Class"	Ted Wass	Michael A. Ross	April 15, 2013	702	6.11
Jeff and Audrey join Adam and Jennifer's cooking class, but a competition ensues after Jennifer criticizes Audrey's cooking. Timmy is freaked out by the similarities between him and Russell's new Indian girlfriend, Radha.
97	10	"Unpleasant Surprises"	Gail Mancuso	Andy Roth	April 22, 2013	711	5.11
Jennifer pushes the guys to throw a bachelor party for Adam, when she learns that they are not planning on doing so. When the guys' plans are derailed when they're stuck on a stalled subway train, they are forced to improvise. Meanwhile, Jeff and Audrey are taken aback by the phallic mural that Jennifer has painted on the wall of their nursery.
98	11	"Timmy Quits"	Megyn Price	Mike Haukom	April 29, 2013	712	6.21
When Russell seemingly knows Timmy's every move, Timmy discovers that Russell had a tracking chip implanted in him during a routine exam. Timmy decides this is the last straw and he packs up and quits. Heidi - a college friend of Jeff's - is in town; Audrey has wrongly assumed for years that Jeff had a fling with her. Heidi tells Audrey that she has never been attracted to Jeff - but when alone with him she tells him that she was attracted to him in college, and still is. Adam is having difficulty choosing whether Jeff or Russell should be his best man. They suggest they both be his best man, which he accepts.
99	12	"A Wee Problem"	Carlos Pinero	Gloria Calderon Kellett	May 6, 2013	710	6.74
Jeff vows to make Brenda wet herself, when he learns how pregnancy affects the female bladder. Meanwhile, Timmy adjusts to his new job and Russell hires a new assistant. Elsewhere, Jennifer needs to get wedding-crazed Adam out of their apartment, so she asks Audrey to take him along on her spa day. The episode ends with Brenda unexpectedly going into labor.
100	13	"100th"	Tom Hertz	Tom Hertz	May 20, 2013	713	6.25
Brenda unexpectedly goes into labor on the day of Jennifer and Adam's wedding. Meanwhile, Timmy receives a call that informs him that Russell did not file the papers on his work visa and he may be deported. [This plot conflict seems like a continuity error because in the episode "Double Down", it was stated Timmy was already a citizen.] Jennifer and Adam look for a sign as to whether they should get married at all, as she frets that these distractions are a sign not to. Just then, a priest walks by, prompting them to wed in the hospital chapel. After Timmy informs everyone that he is to be deported, Russell has an idea while Jennifer and Adam say their vows, and he proposes marriage to Timmy to stop his deportation. The same priest marries them straight afterwards. Audrey visits Jeff while he is cradling their daughter, saying she is pregnant. Jeff announces the news to everyone and the final scene shows Audrey and Jeff in bed, negotiating over who has to feed the baby.
