= Rules of Engagement season 3 =

Rules of Engagement
- Season 3
- No. of episodes: 13

Release
- Original network: CBS
- Original release: March 2 – May 18, 2009

Season chronology
- ← Previous; Season 2 Next → Season 4

The third season of the American television comedy series Rules of Engagement premiered as a mid-season entry on March 2, 2009 and concluded on May 18, 2009. It consists of 13 episodes, each running approximately 22 minutes in length. CBS broadcast the third season at 9:30 pm in the United States, on Mondays except for one episode ("May Divorce Be With You") which was aired on Wednesday.

== Cast ==
=== Main cast ===
- Patrick Warburton as Jeff Bingham
- Megyn Price as Audrey Bingham
- Oliver Hudson as Adam Rhodes
- Bianca Kajlich as Jennifer Morgan
- David Spade as Russell Dunbar

=== Recurring cast ===
- Adhir Kalyan as Timmy
- Orlando Jones as Brad
- Diane Sellers as Waitress

== Episodes ==
No. overall	No. in season	Title	Directed by	Written by	Original release date	Prod. code	US viewers (millions)
23	1	"Russell's Secret"	Mark Cendrowski	Jeffrey Richman	March 2, 2009	304	11.82
Audrey discovers that Russell is a closeted fan of Broadway musicals, a fact she promises to keep secret in exchange for free theater tickets. Meanwhile, Adam and Jennifer take dancing lessons in preparation for their wedding, but it becomes very clear that Jennifer can't dance. Jeff goes to the boat show and meets an old friend, Mike (Bob Odenkirk), who causes Jeff to re-think his & Audrey's spending time together.
24	2	"Voluntary Commitment"	Ted Wass	Linda Videtti Figueiredo	March 9, 2009	302	9.95
After a long line of female assistants, Russell hires Timmy and learns that having a male assistant can be very advantageous. Meanwhile, after volunteering to read to the elderly, Audrey makes a bet with Jeff that she can commit to finishing a project. Featuring Yvette Nicole Brown as the nursing home administrator, and Lou Felder as Charlie, a suave nursing home patient whom Jen assists.
25	3	"Jeff's New Friend"	Ted Wass	Tom Hertz	March 16, 2009	301	11.42
Jeff is surprised when Audrey informs him that the new friend, Brad (Orlando Jones), he made at the gym is gay. Meanwhile, Russell worries the young woman he's dating (Michelle Pierce) might be his daughter.
26	4	"Dad's Visit"	Ted Wass	Mike Sikowitz	March 23, 2009	303	9.37
Much to Audrey's dismay, Jeff's chauvinist father, Roy (Brian Dennehy), who expects Audrey to wait on him hand and foot, extends his visit after spraining his ankle. Meanwhile, Russell has a one-night stand with a woman (Holly Lynch) who won't leave his apartment. Jeff persuades Adam to watch The Godfather movies, much to Jen's dismay.
27	5	"Lyin' King"	Ted Wass	Mike Haukom	March 30, 2009	306	11.03
After getting invited by Brad and Jackie (Sam Harris (singer)) to their much cooler party, Jeff and Audrey lie to Adam and Jennifer to get out of a dinner they are hosting. At the same party, Russell's new assistant Timmy tries to keep him on his best behavior after he ticks off party-goer Jerry Rice (as himself) by hitting on Rice's girlfriend (Helena Mattsson). Things get even more dicy when Adam and Jennifer end up at the party.
28	6	"Poaching Timmy"	Gail Mancuso	Jeffrey Richman	April 13, 2009	311	11.60
Timmy and Audrey conspire when Timmy tires of Russell's demands and Audrey wants to dump her incompetent assistant, Tayna (Kate Micucci). Meanwhile, Jeff thinks he can help the Giants win by re-creating conditions that led to a previous victory, and Adam tries to take Jennifer camping - on the roof of their building.
29	7	"Old Timer's Day"	Gail Mancuso	Tom Hertz	April 20, 2009	312	10.59
After being teased for falling asleep while watching a movie, Jeff tries to prove to Audrey he's young and spry and invites her to watch him play softball. While up at bat, a simple sneeze proves he's older than he thinks. Russell, though, inspires Jeff to not give in to Father Time. Meanwhile, Adam tries to cope with Jennifer's mood swings after she goes off the pill. Featuring Orlando Jones and Tyler Jacob Moore as Brad and Evan, two of Jeff's softball teammates.
30	8	"Twice"	Ken Whittingham	Vanessa McCarthy	April 27, 2009	305	11.30
Frustrated by her colleagues' constant fawning over their newly pregnant co-worker (Melanie Paxson), Audrey pretends that she is also going to have a baby so that she can receive special treatment, too. Meanwhile, Russell takes an Amish teen (Jake Thomas) who is staying with Adam and Jennifer out on the town for his Rumspringa, and Jeff brags about having sex with Audrey twice in one night. Featuring Beth Littleford and Susan Yeagley as Audrey's coworkers.
31	9	"The Challenge"	Gil Junger	Vanessa McCarthy	May 4, 2009	313	11.33
Jeff, Russell and Adam make a bet to see who can "score" the soonest - "married guy" (Jeff), "engaged guy" (Adam), or "single guy" (Russell). Russell's new assistant Timmy is also put into place to make sure Russell doesn't like or "pay for it." But when a series of unfortunate events begin to unwind, Jeff, Russell and Adam are hung out to dry, leaving a winner that takes everyone by surprise. Featuring Luisa Moraes and Carrie Reichenbach.
32	10	"Family Style"	Ted Wass	Mike Sikowitz	May 11, 2009	307	10.14
While on a double date with Brad and his partner Jackie, Jeff gets annoyed when Jackie helps himself to his meal. Not wanting to hurt Jackie's feelings, Audrey demands Jeff keep quiet about the incident. Meanwhile, Russell dates a psychiatrist (Perrey Reeves), and has Timmy pretend he is him during sessions. Elsewhere Adam grows a soul patch.
33	11	"May Divorce Be with You"	Ted Wass	Linda Videtti Figueiredo	May 13, 2009	310	6.30
After Audrey and Jeff learn that their friend Steve (Tony Hale) has just divorced, Audrey agrees to let Steve stay with her and Jeff. She soon regrets her decision after discovering Steve enjoys giving "inappropriate" hugs. Meanwhile Russell meets the Italian brothers (Louis Mandylor and Johnny Palermo) of a one night stand. Featuring Alexis Krause as Tina, Russell's Italian girlfriend.
34	12	"House Money"	Gail Mancuso	Barry Wernick	May 18, 2009	309	7.50
Audrey convinces Jeff that they should do something fun with the profit he made from the sale of his Camaro. However, they regret the idea after their extravagant night ends up costing them much more than they expected. Meanwhile, Adam keeps forgetting his cellphone so Russell decides to pull a prank - sending Adam to a lesbian bar - in order to teach him a lesson. Featuring Alexandra Fatovich, Mylinda Royer, Katie Savoy as bar patrons; Angi Greene as the bartender, Darrin Lackey (waiter), Kurt Long (hotel clerk), and Grinnell Morris as Jeff's work friend Stuart.
35	13	"Sex Toy Story"	Gail Mancuso	Steve Holland	May 18, 2009	308	12.87
After Audrey attends Jennifer's sex-toy party, Jeff wonders if he and Audrey are missing out on something in their personal life. Meanwhile, Russell pretends he's married in order to attract a woman (Sunny Mabrey) whom he overhears saying she prefers married guys. Featuring John Farley (actor) as the sex shop clerk.

== Ratings ==
Episode #	Title	Air Date	Rating	Share	18-49	Viewers
1	Russell's Secret	March 2, 2009	7.3	11	3.9/9	11.86 million
2	Voluntary Commitment	March 9, 2009	6.3	9	3.7/9	10.04 million
3	Jeff's New Friend	March 16, 2009	6.9	10	4.0/10	11.41 million
4	Dad's Visit	March 23, 2009	5.9	9	3.4/8	9.37 million
5	Lyin' King	March 30, 2009	6.5	10	4.1/10	10.99 million
6	Poaching Timmy	April 13, 2009	7.0	11	4.0/10	11.57 million
7	Old Timer's Day	April 20, 2009	6.6	10	3.8/9	10.59 million
8	Twice	April 27, 2009	7.1	11	3.9/10	11.30 million
9	The Challenge	May 4, 2009	6.9	10	4.1/10	11.33 million
10	Family Style	May 11, 2009	6.3	10	3.6/9	10.12 million
11	May Divorce Be With You	May 13, 2009	4.1	7	1.9/6	6.38 million
12	House Money	May 18, 2009	4.7	8	2.6/8	7.49 million
13	Sex Toy Story	May 18, 2009	7.9	12	4.4/11	12.80 million
