= Rules of Engagement season 1 =

Rules of Engagement
- Season 1
- No. of episodes: 7

Release
- Original network: CBS
- Original release: February 5 – March 19, 2007

Season chronology
- Next → Season 2

The first season of the American television sitcom Rules of Engagement premiered on February 5, 2007 and concluded on March 19, 2007. It consists of 7 episodes, each running approximately 22 minutes in length. CBS broadcast the first season on Mondays at 9:30 pm in the United States.

== Cast ==
=== Main cast ===
- Patrick Warburton as Jeff Bingham
- Megyn Price as Audrey Bingham
- Oliver Hudson as Adam Rhodes
- Bianca Kajlich as Jennifer Morgan
- David Spade as Russell Dunbar

== Episodes ==
No. overall	No. in season	Title	Directed by	Written by	Original release date	Prod. code	US viewers (millions)
1	1	"Pilot"	Andy Ackerman	Tom Hertz	February 5, 2007	100	14.84
Married couple Jeff and Audrey have just learned their next door neighbor, Jennifer, has become engaged to her boyfriend, Adam. But when Jeff tries to give Adam advice, he develops doubt about the impending engagement. Jeff inadvertently starts a fight with Audrey about an old bicycle. Jennifer fixes up Adam's best friend, Russell, with her friend Karen (Lauren Stamile) because she believes the right woman could change his habit of being a dedicated womanizer. Adam and Jen make up after hearing the conversation of an elderly couple (Gloria LeRoy and Don Perry). Russell somewhat surprisingly ends up in bed not with Karen, but with a waitress (Audra Blaser).
2	2	"The Birthday Deal"	Andy Ackerman	Tom Hertz	February 12, 2007	101	13.43
When it is time to plan a party for Jeff's birthday, everyone gets involved. But Audrey is spending too much money on the party, which makes Jeff unhappy. Although Jeff will not reveal what he usually receives in the annual birthday deal, Adam brings up the subject with Jennifer and is then worried when Jennifer not only agrees to give him a birthday deal, but announces she wants one in return. Adam's birthday deal is various sex acts from Jennifer. Hers is Adam bringing her breakfast in bed, watching The Notebook with her and cleaning the apartment. Jeff's birthday deal is dinner at the restaurant where he and Audrey went on their first date together.
3	3	"Young and the Restless"	Ted Wass	Jon Sherman	February 19, 2007	102	13.86
Jeff incurs Audrey's wrath after he swoons over Russell's latest date, 24-year-old lifeguard Dani (Maitland Ward). Audrey then bets Jeff that he cannot get a phone number from a younger woman, and gives him a night without his wedding ring to try. Jennifer is angry with Adam after finding out their bed was bought while he was with his ex, Sonia. Later, Jennifer makes Adam uncomfortable while talking about her exes, especially when she says "all of them."
4	4	"Game On"	Ted Wass	Linda Videtti Figueiredo	February 26, 2007	105	13.57
Audrey gains a promotion, but when she tells Jeff, he is not excited about it because the Knicks just lost a game. Jeff invites her to another game to make things right. Adam buys a new video game, which he and Russell quickly become addicted to, until Jennifer makes Adam feel guilty about spending so much on stuff for himself. Later, after being scolded by his latest date (Cynthia Harmon), Russell stops playing the video game, realizing that it is taking up a lot of his time and impeding his sex life.
5	5	"Kids"	Ted Wass	Tom Hertz	March 5, 2007	104	12.51
Jennifer and Adam plan a romantic weekend but end up fighting about the future. Jeff and Audrey visit Dr Sachs (Richard McGonagle) to try to find out why they have not been able to conceive. Russell runs into Constance (Jessica Walter), an older woman whom he had sex with when he was 18 - and decides that he wants to show her his sexual prowess. Featuring: Cyndi Martino.
6	6	"Hard Day's Night"	Ted Wass	Tom Hertz	March 12, 2007	103	11.47
Jeff helps Jennifer move her couch. He pulls a muscle while doing so, after which she massages him to ease the problem. He gets and an erection, which embarrasses them. When Audrey finds out, she is angry, and confronts him. In his pursuit of a hot teacher (Andrea Silvers) Russell is intimidated by a young bully (Colby Paul) and enlists Adam's help.
7	7	"Jeff's Wooby"	Ted Wass	Barry Wernick	March 19, 2007	106	9.26
Audrey is put off by Jeff frequently reminiscing about his T-shirts' significance in connection with events he enjoyed in the 1980s. She wonders if his best times in life were before he met her and turns his shirts into a quilt. Jen discovers and then worries about Adam's previous history with Polynesian girlfriends, and confronts him when a Polynesian waitress (Jessica Rey) feeds him poi. Russell believes he has the perfect girl in Jessie (Maggie Lawson) when she very frequently makes double entendres, thinking that he will soon be having sex with her. He thinks differently when he realizes she is not doing it on purpose and they do not have sex, so he stops seeing her.

== Ratings ==
Episode #	Title	Air date	Rating	Share	18-49	Viewers
1	Pilot	February 5, 2007	9.8	14	5.2/12	14.89 million
2	The Birthday Deal	February 12, 2007	8.7	13	5.0/11	13.50 million
3	Young and the Restless	February 19, 2007	8.9	13	4.9/11	13.94 million
4	Game On	February 26, 2007	8.7	13	4.8/11	13.72 million
5	Kids	March 5, 2007	8.3	13	4.3/10	12.59 million
6	Hard Day's Night	March 12, 2007	7.4	11	4.3/11	11.47 million
7	Jeff's Wooby	March 19, 2007	6.0	9	3.6/8	9.32 million
