= Rules of Engagement season 2 =

Rules of Engagement
- Season 2
- No. of episodes: 15

Release
- Original network: CBS
- Original release: September 24, 2007 – May 19, 2008

Season chronology
- ← Previous; Season 1 Next → Season 3

The second season of the American television comedy series Rules of Engagement premiered on September 24, 2007, and concluded on May 19, 2008. It consists of 15 episodes, each running approximately 22 minutes in length. CBS broadcast the second season on Mondays at 9:30 pm in the United States. No new episodes of the program aired between December and March, due to the 2007–08 Writers Guild of America strike.

== Cast ==
=== Main cast ===
- Patrick Warburton as Jeff Bingham
- Megyn Price as Audrey Bingham
- Oliver Hudson as Adam Rhodes
- Bianca Kajlich as Jennifer Morgan
- David Spade as Russell Dunbar

== Episodes ==
No. overall	No. in season	Title	Directed by	Written by	Original release date	Prod. code	US viewers (millions)
8	1	"Flirting with Disaster"	Gary Halvorson	Steve Holland	September 24, 2007	202	12.23
Jeff's snoring has worsened, frequently disturbing Audrey's sleep. She wants him to have surgery to prevent his snoring. They decide that they should sleep in separate bedrooms, which Jeff prefers. He takes advantage of his new-found freedom by staying up late and living like a college student. Russell and Adam go to the diner, where pretty young waitress Amy (Rachel Boston) flirts with Adam, who reciprocates. When he proudly tells Jennifer at their apartment, she is annoyed and goes to the diner with him to be introduced to Amy.
9	2	"Audrey's Sister"	Ted Wass	Sivert Glarum & Michael Jamin	October 1, 2007	203	10.09
Audrey's sister, Barbara (Heather Locklear), is having problems with her husband Rick and visits Audrey and Jeff. Russell and Barbara go out to a restaurant, play Guitar Hero and she kisses him. Russell tells Jeff that he intends to have sex with her after she splits from Rick. Jeff tells Adam and Russell how much he enjoys spending time alone at his and Audrey's apartment when she is out. Adam would love to spend time at his and Jen's apartment, but has never had a significant amount of time alone there during their cohabitation.
10	3	"Mr. Fix-It"	Gary Halvorson	Tom Hertz	October 8, 2007	201	10.68
Audrey is upset that a woman (Jill Getto Lee) who lives in their building never talks to her, so Jeff asks her to say hello to Audrey. She reluctantly does so and makes it clear to Audrey that he asked her to. Audrey is annoyed with Jeff for asking the woman. Russell is disappointed to find that the girl he's been texting (Jennifer Alden) doesn't just find him funny, but laughs at anything anyone says. Jen and Adam record themselves having sex together in their apartment using her camcorder. They are disappointed with the result and realize that making a sex tape is something that amateurs should not try, and decide that imagination is often better than pictures.
11	4	"Guy Code"	Mark Cendrowski	Mike Haukom	October 15, 2007	204	10.81
Audrey and Jeff have become friends with a married couple, Ray (Tim Conlon) and Katie (Bess Meyer). Ray tells Katie and Audrey that he and Jeff are going to a sports bar. However, they actually go to a strip club, where Ray pays a stripper to give him a handjob. When Jeff tells Audrey about it, she is appalled. Jeff then informs her about "guy code", which involves men keeping things about each other secret and not judging each other. When Ray breaks guy code by informing Audrey that he has broken the diet that she imposed on him, he considers Ray to have betrayed him, so Jeff ends the friendship. Russell wants to have sex with his incompetent, beautiful, young female assistant Danielle (Mircea Monroe). However, there is a company rule against colleagues dating each other. He believes that Adam does not want an assistant, so Russell re-assigns her to him, thinking that he will fire her, leaving him free to take her out. However, Adam does not fire her, so Russell arranges for Jen to pay a surprise visit to Adam's office to meet Danielle. A jealous Jen then tells Adam to fire Danielle.
12	5	"Bag Ladies"	Gail Mancuso	Vanessa McCarthy	October 22, 2007	206	10.82
After hearing that Audrey's sex stories told to her gal-pals pale in comparison to those of her friends, Jeff tries to be more spontaneous. Russell is dating a new girl, Claire (Katie Walder), who turns out to be homeless. Jen buys Adam a present that causes him a lot of embarrassment with the guys.
13	6	"Old School Jeff"	Gary Halvorson	Linda Videtti Figueiredo	October 29, 2007	207	11.57
Jeff has a rare opportunity to have a night with the guys rather than go to a wedding. Audrey and Jen do go to the wedding, where a little boy (Zach Mills) tries to get them both naked. Featuring Maria McCann as the bride.
14	7	"Engagement Party"	Mark Cendrowski	Tom Hertz	November 5, 2007	205	10.77
Jen and Adam decide to let Audrey give them an engagement party so they can get new items for their home. Only things get much more complicated when Jeff finds out. Barbara returns to town with news that could make Russell very happy.
15	8	"Fix-Ups & Downs"	Gary Halvorson	Barry Wernick	November 12, 2007	208	11.46
Audrey and Jen decide to do some matchmaking, setting up their friends Jack (Erik Van Wyck) and Sheila (Meg Wolf), yet the effects hit closer to home when Adam and Jeff get involved. Russell runs into a woman (Carrie Southworth) in Adam and Jeff's building and decides he is in love with her. He spends a lot of time hanging around the building trying to run into her again. Featuring: Wayne Lopez as Oscar, the doorman; Marie Cheatham as Mrs. Fulford.
16	9	"A Visit from Fay"	Mark Cendrowski	Carol Leifer	November 19, 2007	209	11.48
When Adam's free-spirited mother Faye (Peggy Lipton) comes for a visit, Jen is in for the surprise of her life. She learns things about her soon to be mother-in-law that concern her. Meanwhile, Russell sees Faye as a mother-figure. Jeff and Audrey must find other ways to entertain themselves when the satellite dish goes out and they have nothing to watch on TV. Featuring Matthew Brenher as Bruno the artist.
17	10	"Time Share"	Andy Ackerman	Tom Hertz	April 14, 2008	210	10.40
Adam and Jen agree to go away with Jeff and Audrey, even though they must sit through a timeshare sales pitch in order to get a deal on the trip. The weekend takes a turn, however, when Adam and Jen learn the real reason they were invited. To the amusement of the gang, Russell is to be included in an article featuring New York's hottest bachelors under 40 years old. Russell eventually admits to the writer (Carla Toutz) that he is actually 42. Featuring Mike Siegel as timeshare sales guy.
18	11	"Jen at Work"	Gail Mancuso	Steve Holland	April 21, 2008	211	10.57
Adam and Jen realize that living together and working together do not always mix when he hires her to freelance for his company. Meanwhile, Jeff discovers his virility has increased after Jen gives Audrey and him a fertility idol. Featuring Richard McGonagle as Dr. Sachs.
19	12	"Optimal Male"	Ted Wass	Mike Haukom	April 28, 2008	212	10.31
With his life insurance physical exam only a few days away, Jeff struggles to lose weight to be eligible for the "optimal male" category of fitness. Russell tries to impress a woman (Josie Davis) at a charity. Meanwhile, Jen is jealous after Adam bumps into an ex-girlfriend, Stacy (Valerie Azlynn). After Adam invites Stacy to accompany him and Jen to a charity event, Jen counters by inviting her ex-boyfriend, Drake (Teddy Sears).
20	13	"Russell's Father's Son"	Gail Mancuso	Sivert Glarum & Michael Jamin	May 5, 2008	213	10.39
Adam is concerned that Russell will be upset when he finds out his father (Geoff Pierson) had Adam pose as his son in a promotional video he is shooting for his company. Jeff and Audrey become irritated when they let Adam and Jen use their bathroom while their sink is broken.
21	14	"Buyer's Remorse"	Mark Cendrowski	Linda Videtti Figueiredo	May 12, 2008	214	10.62
When Adam and Jen consider buying an apartment in the building they all live in, Jeff and Audrey offer to recommend them to the co-op board. However, before they get the chance, Jeff makes a bad impression on the president of the board. Russell encounters problems at the diner with a new waitress, Kerry (Stephanie Lemelin), a woman whom he had lied to after a one-night stand.
22	15	"Pimp My Bride"	Ted Wass	Barry Wernick	May 19, 2008	215	12.29
Russell reluctantly agrees to host a photo shoot in his apartment for Audrey's magazine, with the hope of landing a date with a hot model (Mini Anden). Adam steps in to play the groom in Audrey's wedding-themed shoot, prompting him to make a decision about his own engagement. Meanwhile, Jeff and Jen discover unexpected common interests with each other while searching for a birthday gift for Audrey.

== Ratings ==
Episode #	Title	Air Date	Rating	Share	18-49	Viewers
1	Flirting With Disaster	September 24, 2007	7.7	11	4.4/10	12.08 million
2	Audrey's Sister	October 1, 2007	6.6	10	3.9/9	10.54 million
3	Mr. Fix It	October 8, 2007	6.8	10	3.8/9	10.71 million
4	Guy Code	October 15, 2007	7.0	10	4.0/9	11.02 million
5	Bag Ladies	October 22, 2007	7.0	10	3.9/9	10.82 million
6	Old School Jeff	October 29, 2007	7.1	10	4.2/9	11.24 million
7	Engagement Party	November 5, 2007	7.0	10	4.0/9	11.02 million
8	Fix Ups & Downs	November 12, 2007	7.2	11	4.3/10	11.53 million
9	A Visit From Fay	November 19, 2007	7.5	11	4.3/10	12.17 million
10	Time Share	April 14, 2008	6.6	10	4.0/10	10.40 million
11	Jen at Work	April 21, 2008	6.7	10	4.1/10	10.63 million
12	Optimal Male	April 28, 2008	6.4	9	3.9/9	10.39 million
13	Russell's Father's Son	May 5, 2008	6.6	10	3.9/9	10.52 million
14	Buyer's Remorse	May 12, 2008	6.7	10	4.1/10	10.72 million
15	Pimp My Bride	May 19, 2008	7.6	11	4.3/10	12.25 million
