= Rules of Engagement season 6 =

Rules of Engagement
- Season 6
- No. of episodes: 15

Release
- Original network: CBS
- Original release: October 20, 2011 – May 17, 2012

Season chronology
- ← Previous; Season 5 Next → Season 7

The sixth season of the American television comedy series Rules of Engagement initially received a 24-episode order and was set to debut on Saturday, October 15, 2011, but relocated to Thursdays due to the low ratings developing from How to Be a Gentleman. After CBS announced the two comedies would swap timeslots, they set the Season 6 debut as October 20, 2011 at 8:30 PM.

Effective January 12, 2012, CBS removed Rules of Engagement from its Thursday lineup, replacing it with the new sitcom Rob starring Rob Schneider. CBS announced that Rules would return to its Thursday 8:30 PM time slot at a later date. After Rob's run of its initial eight episode order, Rules returned March 29 for eight weeks of new episodes. Thus, the sixth season was cut from 24 episodes to 15.

== Cast ==
=== Main cast ===
- Patrick Warburton as Jeff Bingham
- Megyn Price as Audrey Bingham
- Oliver Hudson as Adam Rhodes
- Bianca Kajlich as Jennifer Morgan
- David Spade as Russell Dunbar
- Adhir Kalyan as Timmy Patel

=== Recurring cast ===
- Diane Sellers as Doreen
- Wendi McLendon-Covey as Liz
- Sara Rue as Brenda

== Episodes ==
No. overall	No. in season	Title	Directed by	Written by	Original release date	Prod. code	US viewers (millions)
73	1	"Dirty Talk"	Ted Wass	Mike Sikowitz	October 20, 2011	603	11.45
Russell tries to get out of his marriage to a persistent Liz (Wendi McLendon-Covey), who tries to make it work. After learning that Adam and Jennifer spice up their lovemaking with "dirty talk," Audrey and Jeff attempt to do the same.
74	2	"Bros Before Nodes"	Ted Wass	Michael A. Ross	October 27, 2011	604	10.62
Worried about getting his father's approval, Russell gets Liz all dolled up to meet him. Audrey is concerned over test results from her doctor that must wait until Monday, but Jeff is more concerned about his guys' weekend being cancelled. Meanwhile, Adam has a new friend (Curtis Armstrong, playing himself), which drives Jennifer crazy.
75	3	"Audrey is Dumb"	Tom Hertz	Tom Hertz	November 3, 2011	601	11.81
Audrey’s throat surgery makes her unable to speak, much to Jeff’s delight. Adam begins to realize how much he gets by on his looks alone. Meanwhile, Russell tells Timmy the only way that he will get a raise is if he does Russell’s dirty work and fires someone.
76	4	"Nature Calls"	Ted Wass	Mike Haukom	November 10, 2011	606	11.57
When the gang decides to take a trip to Vermont to check out the fall foliage, they find themselves wishing they had never left home. Adam gets poison ivy on his hands, Jeff has an embarrassing experience on the inn's community computer, and Liz begins to realize that her marriage is a sham just as Russell finds renewed faith in their relationship.
77	5	"Shy Dial"	Ted Wass	Tim Doyle	November 17, 2011	605	10.90
Jeff uses an app on his phone that automatically puts his calls through to Audrey's voicemail. Meanwhile, Adam befriends a clothing salesman (Todd Grinnell) who helps defend him against his friends when he makes some questionable clothing choices. Liz tries to seduce Timmy.
78	6	"Cheating"	Tom Hertz	Tim Doyle	December 8, 2011	524	9.95
Audrey tries to persuade Jeff to eat healthier when he is diagnosed with high cholesterol, but he can't help sneaking unhealthy food with Brenda (Sara Rue), who is eating for two. Jennifer starts working out at 5 AM and expects Adam to conform to her schedule, which includes a 9:30 PM bed time. Meanwhile, Russell tries to keep up with his new college intern on the club circuit.
79	7	"The Chair"	Ted Wass	Mike Haukom	December 15, 2011	611	9.53
When an arm chair that Audrey bought off the internet arrives and is awful-looking, Jeff pretends to love it in order to teach Audrey a lesson about buying on impulse. Elsewhere, Russell decides to sue Timmy for sexual harassment as an act of revenge, but his plan backfires.
80	8	"Scavenger Hunt"	Mark Cendrowski	Mike Haukom	March 29, 2012 (Note: This episode was available prior to its airdate on the Season 5 DVD released on February 7, 2012, as it was produced during that season.)	525	8.65
To apologize for walking out on Liz's game night, Jeff sends Audrey on a romantic scavenger hunt. However, a misunderstanding of clues angers Audrey instead. Meanwhile, after Adam accidentally reveals his fiance's "big secret," Russell painstakingly tries to find a leaked sex tape of Jennifer's.
81	9	"A Big Bust"	Leonard R. Garner Jr.	Gloria Calderon Kellett	April 5, 2012	610	8.58
Accidentally, Audrey raises money for her maid's breast implants, angering her neighbors. Meanwhile, Russell tries to seduce Timmy's running partner, and Adam attempts to turn himself into a runner for a city marathon.
82	10	"After the Lovin'"	Ted Wass	Tom Hertz	April 12, 2012	613	8.46
When Jeff discovers that Audrey uses sex as a way to manipulate him, he attempts to turn the tables around on her. Meanwhile, Jennifer tries to use Audrey's technique on Adam in order to get a pet dog, but it backfires on her when Adam insists that they get a bird instead. Elsewhere, Russell, Timmy and Adam, hoping to go into business, shoot a commercial for a spoon that cools soup.
83	11	"Missed Connections"	Tom Hertz	Christopher Shiple	April 19, 2012	607	7.57
When a couple cancels their plans to go to dinner, Jeff and Audrey blame each other for the couple's unwillingness to hang out with them. Meanwhile, Russell interferes with Timmy's attempt to track down a girl he smiled at on the subway, and Adam drums with a group of boys he meets alongside the subway.
84	12	"The Five Things"	Ted Wass	Dan Kopelman	April 26, 2012	609	8.17
Audrey wants to keep up with her friend, so she pushes Jeff to list five nice things about her, but predictably, Jeff is stumped. Meanwhile, Russell tries to convince Timmy that he should serenade a woman he likes, and Adam and Jennifer accidentally receive a financial statement belonging to Jeff and Audrey.
85	13	"Meat Wars"	Ted Wass	Lance Whinery	May 3, 2012	612	8.88
When Audrey and Jennifer make plans to see a Bon Jovi concert for a girls' night out, Jeff hurts Adam's feelings when he announces he'd prefer a night alone over hanging together.
86	14	"Goodbye Dolly"	Ted Wass	Becky Mann & Audra Sielaff	May 10, 2012	602	8.77
Audrey tries to prepare for motherhood by continuing to repair a doll that she keeps damaging. Meanwhile, Jeff questions whether the very pregnant Brenda should be dating anymore, and Adam tries to convince Jennifer that he is a manly man.
87	15	"Audrey's Shower"	Ted Wass	Vanessa McCarthy	May 17, 2012	608	7.17
Audrey is given a baby shower by Jennifer, but Jennifer has to scramble after realizing the invitations list the wrong date. Audrey starts to feel like a bystander when all the attention at the shower is given to Brenda. Meanwhile, Jeff becomes fascinated with Brenda's maternity wear, and Russell begins to display many creative talents after deciding to take a break from women for a while.

== Ratings ==
Episode #	Title	Air Date	Rating	Share	18-49	Viewers
1	Dirty Talk	October 20, 2011	TBA	TBA	3.6/10	11.45 million
2	Bros Before Nodes	October 27, 2011	TBA	TBA	3.3/9	10.62 million
3	Audrey is Dumb	November 3, 2011	TBA	TBA	3.7/10	11.81 million
4	Nature Calls	November 10, 2011	TBA	TBA	3.5/9	11.57 million
5	Shy Dial	November 17, 2011	TBA	TBA	3.6/10	10.90 million
6	Cheating	December 8, 2011	TBA	TBA	3.0/8	9.95 million
7	The Chair	December 15, 2011	TBA	TBA	2.7/8	9.53 million
8	Scavenger Hunt	March 29, 2012	TBA	TBA	2.7/8	8.65 million
