= Rules of Engagement season 4 =

Rules of Engagement
- Season 4
- No. of episodes: 13

Release
- Original network: CBS
- Original release: March 1 – May 24, 2010

Season chronology
- ← Previous; Season 3 Next → Season 5

The fourth season of the American television comedy series Rules of Engagement premiered as a mid-season entry on March 1, 2010, and concluded on May 24, 2010. It consists of 13 episodes, each running approximately 22 minutes in length. CBS broadcast the fourth season on Mondays at 8:30 pm in the United States between How I Met Your Mother and Two and a Half Men.

== Cast ==
=== Main cast ===
- Patrick Warburton as Jeff Bingham
- Megyn Price as Audrey Bingham
- Oliver Hudson as Adam Rhodes
- Bianca Kajlich as Jennifer Morgan
- David Spade as Russell Dunbar
- Adhir Kalyan as Timmy Patel

=== Recurring cast ===
- Diane Sellers as Doreen
- Nazneen Contractor as Suneetha

== Episodes ==
No. overall	No. in season	Title	Directed by	Written by	Original release date	Prod. code	US viewers (millions)
36	1	"Flirting"	John Pasquin	Tom Hertz	March 1, 2010	401	9.73
Jeff takes Russell's advice and flirts back with a female colleague (Virginia Williams) only to discover that she is open to having an affair with him. Meanwhile, Russell sends Timmy to retrieve his phone from the apartment of a one night stand (Amanda Baker).
37	2	"Snoozin' for a Bruisin'"	Andy Cadiff	Barry Wernick	March 8, 2010	406	10.07
When Jeff and Audrey switch sides of the bed, Jeff accidentally rolls over and clocks Audrey in the face, landing her in the hospital, and leading to a big misunderstanding. Meanwhile, Adam tries to get his upstairs neighbor (Skyler Stone) to stop playing his guitar so loudly, and Timmy shares his harrowing experiences working as Russel's assistant with other assistants (Luke Diliberto, Lara Everly, Kurt David Anderson, and Ary Katz) he encounters. Featuring Christopher Carroll (doctor), Marsha Clark (social worker), Keith Pillow (hospital administrator).
38	3	"Atlantic City"	John Pasquin	Lance Whinery	March 15, 2010	410	7.70
Audrey tries to make Jeff feel guilty for not telling her that his friend's bachelor party in Atlantic City was cancelled - and going anyway; however, her plan backfires when Jeff discovers that Audrey is also being deceitful about her weekend. Featuring Jeff Clarke as Chuck, and Matt Levin as the blackjack dealer.
39	4	"Ghost Story"	Andy Cadiff	Alex Barnow & Marc Firek	March 22, 2010	403	8.48
Audrey is upset when Jeff reveals to her that he doesn't believe she saw her dead grandmother's ghost. After a break-in, Adam and Jennifer realize they have nothing worth stealing. Meanwhile, Russell tries to persuade Timmy not to go through with his arranged marriage to Sunitha (guest star Nazneen Contractor).
40	5	"The Four Pillars"	John Pasquin	Mike Sikowitz	March 29, 2010	402	7.35
Audrey wants her and Jeff to see a couples therapist (Alan Ruck); unbeknownst to Audrey, Jeff only agrees when he thinks it will lead to more sex. Meanwhile, Adam enlists Timmy's help to try to take an engagement photo that doesn't make him look gay, and Russell develops a crush on Timmy's fiance, Sunitha. Guest star: Nazneen Contractor as Sunitha.
41	6	"3rd Wheel"	Andy Cadiff	Vanessa McCarthy	April 5, 2010	405	7.04
Audrey's lies to her homely friend, Liz (guest star Wendi McLendon-Covey), that she is on Jeff's list of women he'd sleep with if Audrey wasn't around, putting Jeff in an awkward situation. Meanwhile, Adam tries to hide his snacks from a dieting Jennifer, and Timmy introduces Russell to charity work. Featuring Robert Alan Beuth as the city official.
42	7	"Indian Giver"	Andy Cadiff	Jeffrey Richman	April 12, 2010	404	7.36
Audrey is surprised by Jeff's sudden interest in her favorite reality show, until she discovers the reason. Meanwhile, to Russell's delight, Timmy has second thoughts about his impending arranged marriage. Guest starring Nazneen Contractor as Sunitha. Featuring Eli Jane as Lacey, and Andrew Thacher as Jerry Waldman.
43	8	"Free Free Time"	John Pasquin	Christopher Shiple	April 19, 2010	408	7.49
When Audrey's weekly girls' night out gets cancelled, Jeff tries to get her out of the house to reclaim his "free night"; however, his plans get foiled every step of the way. Meanwhile, Russell discovers that Timmy has a lot of pent-up aggression toward him, so he introduces Timmy to a successful former assistant, Maynard (guest star Marcus Toji).
44	9	"The Score"	John Pasquin	Gloria Calderon Kellett	April 26, 2010	409	6.83
Jeff spends the evening trying to avoid learning the score of a N.Y. Rangers game after Audrey forces him to give up his tickets and go to her boss' party instead. Meanwhile, at the game, Russell is mortified when Timmy openly roots against the home team; Adam lucks into the perfect birthday gift for Jennifer. Featuring Noah Munck as Mackenzie; Sarah Knowlton as Audrey's boss, Pam; Vanessa Claire Stewart as Maya.
45	10	"The Surrogate"	Gail Mancuso	Jeffrey Richman & Mike Sikowitz	May 3, 2010	412	7.21
An overly enthusiastic Audrey pushes it too far with a surrogate mother (guest star Jaime Pressly as Pam) who she and Jeff are considering paying to have their baby. Meanwhile, Russell shamelessly pokes fun at Jennifer and Adam's wedding web site, leading to Jennifer blackmailing Russell - with Timmy's help.
46	11	"Reunion"	John Pasquin	Mike Haukom	May 10, 2010	407	8.16
Audrey attends her high school reunion in Nebraska, intent on proving to her former classmates how great her life is in New York City. But things don't go as planned. Meanwhile, Russell ruins Timmy's dinner party after finding out he was not invited. Featuring Kevin Berntson as Bob (Audrey's high school boyfriend), Laura McLauchlin (as Bob's wife Ellen), Andrew Lukich as Matt, Mary K. DeVault as Lisa, Missy Doty as Cheryl; Maitland McConnell as Sarah (Timmy's date).
47	12	"Harassment"	Leonard R. Garner Jr.	Vanessa McCarthy	May 17, 2010	411	7.65
A new employee (Travis Schuldt) with an axe to grind against Audrey files a sexual harassment claim against her. Meanwhile, after being teased for playing cricket, Timmy challenges Jeff to a game to prove the sport is not for wimps. Guest starring Susan Yeagley and Beth Littleford as Tracy and Laura, Audrey's man-hungry coworkers; Kyle T. Heffner as the "HR guy"
48	13	"They Do?"	Gail Mancuso	Tom Hertz	May 24, 2010	413	8.10
Adam and Jennifer plan a secret wedding, inviting only Jeff & Audrey (who think they are just going out to dinner with them); however, a series of unfortunate events puts Adam & Jen's plans in jeopardy. Meanwhile, to keep Russell and Timmy from finding out about the ceremony, Adam tells them he is staging an intervention for Jeff.

Note: The events in episode 1 of season five ("Surro-gate") take place in the immediate aftermath of the events in episode 10 of season four ("The Surrogate"), with the events in episodes 11, 12 and 13 of season four taking place outside of the story line of "The Surrogate" and "Surro-gate."

== Ratings ==
Episode #	Title	Air Date	Rating	Share	18-49	Viewers
1	Flirting	March 1, 2010	5.9	9	3.5/9	9.89 million
2	Snoozin' for a Bruzin'	March 8, 2010	TBA	TBA	3.6/10	10.10 million
3	Atlantic City	March 15, 2010	TBA	TBA	2.7/8	7.80 million
4	Ghost Story	March 22, 2010	TBA	TBA	3.3/9	8.54 million
5	The Four Pillars	March 29, 2010	TBA	TBA	2.9/7	7.30 million
6	Third Wheel	April 5, 2010	TBA	TBA	3.6/10	10.19 million
7	Indian Giver	April 12, 2010	TBA	TBA	2.8/7	7.38 million
8	Free Free Time	April 19, 2010	TBA	TBA	3.0/7	7.45 million
9	The Score	April 26, 2010	TBA	TBA	2.4/7	6.70 million
10	The Surrogate	May 3, 2010	4.6	7	2.8/8	7.21 million
11	Reunion	May 10, 2010				8.18 million
12	Harassment	May 17, 2010				7.71 million
13	They Do?	May 24, 2010			3.3/9	8.23 million
