= Dominic Burgess =

British actor (born 1982)

- Born: 29 July 1982 (age 44); Stoke-on-Trent, Staffordshire, England
- Occupations: Actor, writer, director
- Years active: 2005–present
- Spouse: Mathew Yanagiya

Dominic Burgess (born Dominic James Cooper; 29 July 1982) is an English actor. He is known for his appearances in several television adverts and series such as Raising Hope, Doctor Who, Agents of S.H.I.E.L.D., It's Always Sunny in Philadelphia, American Horror Story, Feud: Bette and Joan, and Star Wars: Skeleton Crew.

== Early life ==
Burgess was born in Stoke-on-Trent, Staffordshire. He attended Newcastle-under-Lyme School, performing in school productions of Death of a Salesman and Twelfth Night, among others. He gained a place at the Academy of Live and Recorded Arts (ALRA) and won a Dance and Drama Awards Scholarship on the three-year Acting course. He auditioned for his first professional role on graduation day in his last year at ALRA for the film Batman Begins.

== Career ==
Burgess' first TV credit was on the BBC flagship series and worldwide hit, Doctor Who as a game show contestant, Agorax. He moved to Los Angeles in 2007 and made subsequent appearances in Agents of S.H.I.E.L.D., It's Always Sunny in Philadelphia and The Leftovers.

Burgess became a regular fixture on the Disney hit series, A.N.T. Farm, and appeared as a recurring guest on The Magicians as the Ram God Ember, The Good Place as the accident prone-red boot wearing Henry, and on The Flash as meta-villain Kilgore. Burgess also appeared as Mr. Vup in Star Trek: Picard for the episode "Stardust City Rag." Burgess said that, as a Trekkie, his appearance on Star Trek was a "dream come true."

Burgess received media attention and acclaim for his portrayal of Victor Buono in the Ryan Murphy created Feud. "Played with uncanny precision by Dominic Burgess, Baby Jane co-star Victor Buono lets Feud give a nod to the plight of closeted actors in Hollywood at that moment and also to smartly weave in Davis' treasured ties to the gay community."

== Personal life ==
Burgess is gay and married to actor and stunt performer Mathew Yanagiya.

== Filmography ==
=== Film ===
Year	Title	Role	Notes
2005	Batman Begins	Narrows Cop	
2007	Itch	Jimmy	
2008	Colin	Pots	
2015	Lethal Seduction	Sam	
2019	Ma	Stu	
2021	Breaking News in Yuba County	Captain Riggins	
2023	Rebel Moon	Dash Thif	Netflix film

=== Television ===
Year	Title	Role	Notes
2005	Doctor Who	Agorax	Episode: "Bad Wolf"
2008	1000 Ways to Die	Paddy	Episode "Death: A User's Manual"
2009	Leverage	Security Guard	Episode: "The Snow Job"
2010	Rules of Engagement	Clerk	Episode: "Free Free Time"
2013	Agents of S.H.I.E.L.D.	Englishman	Episode: "Eye Spy"
2013–2014	A.N.T. Farm	Zoltan Grundy	Recurring role, season 3
2014	Dad	Funeral Parlor Employee	Episode: "Jerk in a Box"
2014	Legit	Mark	Episode: "Reunion"
2015	It's Always Sunny in Philadelphia	Psycho Pete	Episode: "Psycho Pete Returns"
2015	The Leftovers	Dr. Goodheart	2 episodes
2016	2 Broke Girls	Ned	Episode: "And the Booth Babes"
2016	Roots	Lord Dunmore	Episode: "Part 2"
2016	The Magicians	Ember	Recurring role
2016, 2019	The Good Place	Henry	3 episodes
2017	Feud: Bette and Joan	Victor Buono	Recurring role
2017	The Thundermans	Supermanny	Episode: "Come What Mayhem"
2017	The Night Shift	Arthur Wilson	Episode: "Control"
2017	Teen Wolf	Barnes	Episode: "Pressure Test"
2017–2018	The Flash	Kilg%re / Ramsey Deacon	2 episodes
2018	Supernatural	Richard Greenstreet	Episode: "A Most Holy Man"
2018	American Horror Story: Apocalypse	Phil Devlin	Episode: "Sojourn"
2019	The Rookie	Tommy Lamont	Episode: "The Shake Up"
2019	Santa Clarita Diet	Radul	Recurring role
2019	Modern Family	Nate	2 episodes
2020	Star Trek: Picard	Mr. Vup	Episode: "Stardust City Rag"
2020	Side Hustle	Antwerp	Episode: "Start Hustling"
2020, 2022	Better Things	Uncle Eddie	2 episodes
2021	Them: Covenant	Friendly Orderly	1 episode
2021	Dr. Death	Jerry Summers	Recurring role
2022	9-1-1: Lone Star	Dave Sheffield	2 episodes
2022	Dahmer – Monster: The Jeffrey Dahmer Story	John Wayne Gacy	Episode: "God of Forgiveness, God of Vengeance"
2022	NCIS: Los Angeles	Herman Cooper	Episode: "Survival of The Fittest"
2022	Our Flag Means Death	Jeffrey Fettering	Episode: "Wherever You Go, There You Are"
2023	American Horror Story: Delicate	Hamish Moss	Recurring role
2024	Palm Royale	Grayman	Recurring role
2024	Criminal Minds	Eddie Dayton	Episode: "Conspiracy vs. Theory"
2024	The Perfect Couple	Greg	Post-production
2024	NCIS	Leonard	Episode: "The Trouble with Hal"
2024	Star Wars: Skeleton Crew	Beef	Recurring role
2025	Good American Family	Tom	Episode: “Jump the Jitters out”
2026	Ghosts (US)	Winston	Episode: "Across the Pond"
2027	Criminal	Delron	

=== Video games ===
Year	Title	Role	Notes
2025	Game of Thrones: Kingsroad	Additional Voices	
2025	MindsEye	Hunter Morrison	
2026	Grand Theft Auto VI	The Local Population	

== Awards and nominations ==
Year	Festival	Category	Nominated work	Result
2018	Sonoma International Film Festival	Best Narrative Short	Sam Did It	Won
2018	Los Angeles Comedy Festival	Best Short Film	Sam Did It	Won
2018	Los Angeles Comedy Festival	Audience Award	Sam Did It	Won
