= Jeff Day =

Jeff Day may refer to:

- an episode of Rules of Engagement (season 5)
- an episode of New Girl (season 5)
