= Michael Catherwood =

American radio personality (born 1979)

Mike Catherwood
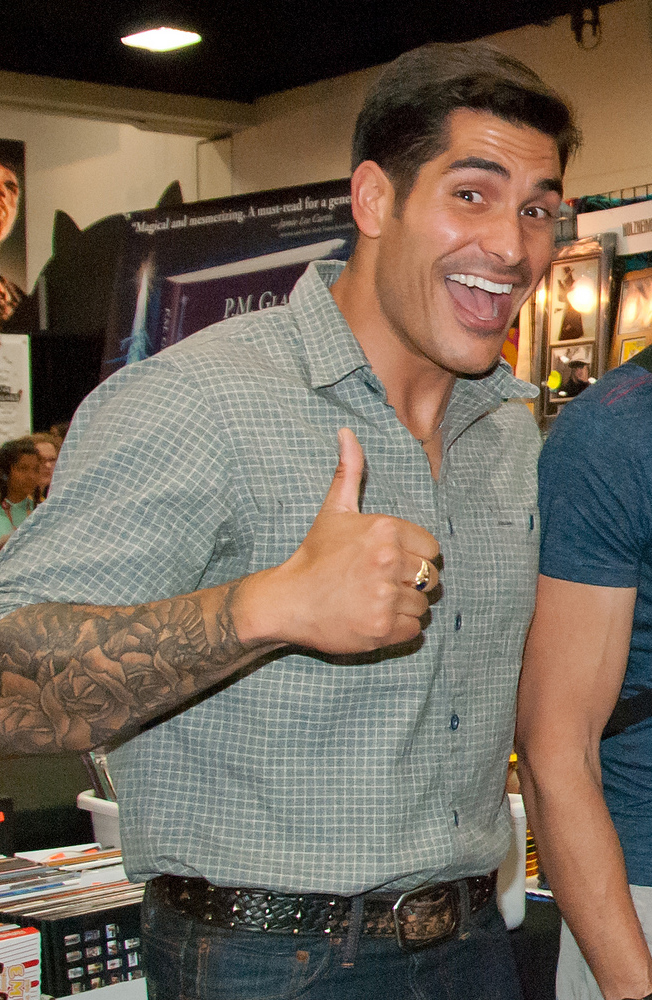
- Born: Michael Dwight Catherwood; March 15, 1979 (age 47); San Marino, California, U.S.
- Spouse: Bianca Kajlich (m. 2012)
- Children: 1
- Presenting career
- Show: Kevin and Bean
- Show: Loveline
- Station: KROQ
- Style: Music/Talk
- Country: United States

Michael Dwight Catherwood (born March 15, 1979), also known as Psycho Mike, is an American radio personality. He is known primarily for his work at KROQ-FM on Kevin and Bean and as the co-host of Loveline from 2010 to 2016, and Neon Black podcast.

== Early life ==
Catherwood grew up near San Marino, California. His teenage years were the start of his problems with substance abuse, as he began drinking at an early age. He attended San Marino High School.

== Radio ==
=== Kevin and Bean Show ===
Catherwood was the assistant producer for the Kevin and Bean show, and frequently stars in man-on-the-street segments as well as parodies of most commercial songs which generally involve crude themes. Catherwood is also an amateur body builder and a certified personal trainer and has appeared in several segments educating listeners about exercise and nutrition.

He is known for performing many vocal impersonations, including Gene Simmons, Kevin Federline, Spencer Pratt, Manny Ramirez, Lamar Odom, Antonio Villaraigosa, Tom DeLonge, Adam Carolla, and Anthony Kiedis, as well as a character of his own invention named "Rudy," a stereotypical heavy-accented cholo ex-con with a penchant for marijuana and manscaping. Other characters he made up were "Sven," a Nordic Viking of the disco and "Carbuncle", a pirate that sails the smegma of foreskins.

In June 2007, he created a KROQ sensation, a parody of the Plain White T's song "Hey There Delilah" called "Hey There Vagina." The song was the most requested song on the station for a week until station lawyers quashed it, claiming it was "indecent." The station also pulled its own link to the song.

Catherwood rejoined KROQ's Kevin and Bean show in January 2018 after leaving the Dr. Drew Midday Live show., replacing host Ralph Garman.

=== Loveline ===
On March 21, 2010, he was permanently hired as the co-host of the national call-in radio show Loveline, with physician host Dr. Drew Pinsky. Catherwood frequently drew on his own past experience as a drug addict to educate and confront callers on the subject of substance abuse. On March 16, 2016, Catherwood announced on the air that he would be leaving Loveline at the end of the month, and his final day as host was March 31, 2016. Loveline itself went off the air permanently on April 28, 2016.

=== Dr. Drew Midday Live with Mike Catherwood ===
On January 5, 2015, Catherwood and Pinsky launched a new program, Dr. Drew Midday Live with Mike Catherwood on KABC in Los Angeles. The show was focused on news and current events, with Catherwood hosting the last hour of the show alone to talk about a topic of his own choosing. He left the show in January 2018 to go back to Kevin and Bean, and was replaced by Lauren Sivan.

=== The Jason Ellis Show ===
As of 2016, Catherwood is a Friday regular on The Jason Ellis Show on Sirius XM Faction Talk.

=== Control Forever ===
As of 2018, Catherwood hosts Control Freak; a mini-doc series that explores demographics that are outside of center on the Control Forever network.

== Podcasting ==
Catherwood hosted a podcast titled Swole Patrol with Dr. Drew. The show was focused on fitness, nutrition and exercise. The podcast ran for 27 episodes in 2018 and 2019, with the final episode published on March 19, 2019.

As of January 2018 Catherwood also hosts Neon Black, a weekly podcast with a quick-fire approach to music, film and popular culture along with co-hosts Cheyne Gilmore and Ryan Jaso.

Catherwood also hosts High and Dry, a podcast with Jason Ellis (radio host) where they discuss their daily lives among various other topics.

Catherwood is now host of "Mikey Likes You" on BLEAV podcast network.

== Television ==
Live with Regis and Kelly

- On January 28, 2011, Mike co-hosted with Kelly Ripa. Viewers voted Mike in as a fill-in for Regis Philbin.

Dancing with the Stars

- On February 28, 2011, during a segment of The Bachelor, Dancing with the Stars announced its upcoming contestants, and Catherwood was introduced to join the cast debuting on March 21, 2011. He was partnered with professional dancer Lacey Schwimmer. Catherwood admitted while he is an athlete, he had no dance experience and no "grace". His Loveline cohost, Dr. Drew, was highly supportive of his competition, appearing each night in the audience with his wife and children, and making appeals for fans of the show to vote. At one point, Pinsky facetiously said he would run across the stage and forearm-tackle Len Goodman (in a manner similar to Shawne "Lights Out" Merriman) if he gave Catherwood a bad score.

On March 29, 2011 he became the first contestant of the 12th season to be eliminated, followed by talk show host Wendy Williams.

The Bad Girls Club (Season 6)

- Catherwood appeared on Episode 7 of Season 6 where the girls appeared as guests on the radio show, Loveline.

American Chopper Live "The Build Off"

- Catherwood appeared as the host for American Chopper Live "The Build Off"—a live motorbike-building competition with Paul Teutul Jr., Paul Teutul Sr., and Jesse James. The show aired on December 6, 2011, on The Discovery Channel

The Choice

- In 2012, he participated in Fox's dating game show The Choice.

Chain Reaction

- In late 2014, Catherwood was named host of GSN's 2015 revival of the game show Chain Reaction (2nd incarnation as a GSN Original, 4th incarnation overall). His tenure as host only lasted 40 episodes and was sandwiched in between two incarnations both hosted by Dylan Lane.

Television
| Year | Title | Role | Notes |
|---|---|---|---|
| 2014–2016 | Undateable | Mike | Guest appearance (Season 2, episode 6,7) |
| 2015–2016 | Chain Reaction | Himself | Host |

== Personal life ==
Catherwood has Irish and Mexican ancestry. Catherwood married actress Bianca Kajlich (Rules of Engagement) on December 16, 2012. They first met during an episode of Loveline. The couple have a daughter, born in 2014.

Catherwood is a recovering addict.

| Preceded by Dylan Lane (2006-2007) | Host of Chain Reaction; 2015-2016 | Succeeded by Dylan Lane (2021-present) |
| Preceded by Stryker | Co-host of Loveline; 2010-present | Succeeded by incumbent |
