= List of Rules of Engagement episodes =

Rules of Engagement is an American television sitcom created by Tom Hertz that ran on CBS from February 5, 2007 to May 20, 2013. A total of 100 episodes were produced, spanning seven seasons.

== Series overview ==
Season	Episodes	Originally released	
Season	Episodes	First released	Last released
1	7	February 5, 2007	March 19, 2007
2	15	September 24, 2007	May 19, 2008
3	13	March 2, 2009	May 18, 2009
4	13	March 1, 2010	May 24, 2010
5	24	September 20, 2010	May 19, 2011
6	15	October 20, 2011	May 17, 2012
7	13	February 4, 2013	May 20, 2013

== Episodes ==
=== Season 1 (2007) ===
No. overall	No. in season	Title	Directed by	Written by	Original release date	Prod. code	US viewers (millions)
1	1	"Pilot"	Andy Ackerman	Tom Hertz	February 5, 2007	100	14.84
2	2	"The Birthday Deal"	Andy Ackerman	Tom Hertz	February 12, 2007	101	13.43
3	3	"Young and the Restless"	Ted Wass	Jon Sherman	February 19, 2007	102	13.86
4	4	"Game On"	Ted Wass	Linda Videtti Figueiredo	February 26, 2007	105	13.57
5	5	"Kids"	Ted Wass	Tom Hertz	March 5, 2007	104	12.51
6	6	"Hard Day's Night"	Ted Wass	Tom Hertz	March 12, 2007	103	11.47
7	7	"Jeff's Wooby"	Ted Wass	Barry Wernick	March 19, 2007	106	9.26

=== Season 2 (2007–08) ===
No. overall	No. in season	Title	Directed by	Written by	Original release date	Prod. code	US viewers (millions)
8	1	"Flirting with Disaster"	Gary Halvorson	Steve Holland	September 24, 2007	202	12.23
9	2	"Audrey's Sister"	Ted Wass	Sivert Glarum & Michael Jamin	October 1, 2007	203	10.09
10	3	"Mr. Fix-It"	Gary Halvorson	Tom Hertz	October 8, 2007	201	10.68
11	4	"Guy Code"	Mark Cendrowski	Mike Haukom	October 15, 2007	204	10.81
12	5	"Bag Ladies"	Gail Mancuso	Vanessa McCarthy	October 22, 2007	206	10.82
13	6	"Old School Jeff"	Gary Halvorson	Linda Videtti Figueiredo	October 29, 2007	207	11.57
14	7	"Engagement Party"	Mark Cendrowski	Tom Hertz	November 5, 2007	205	10.77
15	8	"Fix-Ups & Downs"	Gary Halvorson	Barry Wernick	November 12, 2007	208	11.46
16	9	"A Visit from Fay"	Mark Cendrowski	Carol Leifer	November 19, 2007	209	11.48
17	10	"Time Share"	Andy Ackerman	Tom Hertz	April 14, 2008	210	10.40
18	11	"Jen at Work"	Gail Mancuso	Steve Holland	April 21, 2008	211	10.57
19	12	"Optimal Male"	Ted Wass	Mike Haukom	April 28, 2008	212	10.31
20	13	"Russell's Father's Son"	Gail Mancuso	Sivert Glarum & Michael Jamin	May 5, 2008	213	10.39
21	14	"Buyer's Remorse"	Mark Cendrowski	Linda Videtti Figueiredo	May 12, 2008	214	10.62
22	15	"Pimp My Bride"	Ted Wass	Barry Wernick	May 19, 2008	215	12.29

=== Season 3 (2009) ===
No. overall	No. in season	Title	Directed by	Written by	Original release date	Prod. code	US viewers (millions)
23	1	"Russell's Secret"	Mark Cendrowski	Jeffrey Richman	March 2, 2009	304	11.82
24	2	"Voluntary Commitment"	Ted Wass	Linda Videtti Figueiredo	March 9, 2009	302	9.95
25	3	"Jeff's New Friend"	Ted Wass	Tom Hertz	March 16, 2009	301	11.42
26	4	"Dad's Visit"	Ted Wass	Mike Sikowitz	March 23, 2009	303	9.37
27	5	"Lyin' King"	Ted Wass	Mike Haukom	March 30, 2009	306	11.03
28	6	"Poaching Timmy"	Gail Mancuso	Jeffrey Richman	April 13, 2009	311	11.60
29	7	"Old Timer's Day"	Gail Mancuso	Tom Hertz	April 20, 2009	312	10.59
30	8	"Twice"	Ken Whittingham	Vanessa McCarthy	April 27, 2009	305	11.30
31	9	"The Challenge"	Gil Junger	Vanessa McCarthy	May 4, 2009	313	11.33
32	10	"Family Style"	Ted Wass	Mike Sikowitz	May 11, 2009	307	10.14
33	11	"May Divorce Be with You"	Ted Wass	Linda Videtti Figueiredo	May 13, 2009	310	6.30
34	12	"House Money"	Gail Mancuso	Barry Wernick	May 18, 2009	309	7.50
35	13	"Sex Toy Story"	Gail Mancuso	Steve Holland	May 18, 2009	308	12.87

=== Season 4 (2010) ===
No. overall	No. in season	Title	Directed by	Written by	Original release date	Prod. code	US viewers (millions)
36	1	"Flirting"	John Pasquin	Tom Hertz	March 1, 2010	401	9.73
37	2	"Snoozin' for a Bruisin'"	Andy Cadiff	Barry Wernick	March 8, 2010	406	10.07
38	3	"Atlantic City"	John Pasquin	Lance Whinery	March 15, 2010	410	7.70
39	4	"Ghost Story"	Andy Cadiff	Alex Barnow & Marc Firek	March 22, 2010	403	8.48
40	5	"The Four Pillars"	John Pasquin	Mike Sikowitz	March 29, 2010	402	7.35
41	6	"3rd Wheel"	Andy Cadiff	Vanessa McCarthy	April 5, 2010	405	7.04
42	7	"Indian Giver"	Andy Cadiff	Jeffrey Richman	April 12, 2010	404	7.36
43	8	"Free Free Time"	John Pasquin	Christopher Shiple	April 19, 2010	408	7.49
44	9	"The Score"	John Pasquin	Gloria Calderon Kellett	April 26, 2010	409	6.83
45	10	"The Surrogate"	Gail Mancuso	Jeffrey Richman & Mike Sikowitz	May 3, 2010	412	7.21
46	11	"Reunion"	John Pasquin	Mike Haukom	May 10, 2010	407	8.16
47	12	"Harassment"	Leonard R. Garner Jr.	Vanessa McCarthy	May 17, 2010	411	7.65
48	13	"They Do?"	Gail Mancuso	Tom Hertz	May 24, 2010	413	8.10

=== Season 5 (2010–11) ===
No. overall	No. in season	Title	Directed by	Written by	Original release date	Prod. code	US viewers (millions)
49	1	"Surro-gate"	Ted Wass	Tom Hertz	September 20, 2010	503	8.35
50	2	"The Bank"	Ted Wass	Mike Sikowitz	September 27, 2010	502	8.15
51	3	"Rug-of-War"	Ted Wass	Barry Wernick	October 4, 2010	501	8.43
52	4	"Handy Man"	Ted Wass	Mike Haukom	October 11, 2010	504	7.99
53	5	"Play Ball"	Ted Wass	Vanessa McCarthy	October 18, 2010	505	7.86
54	6	"Baked"	Ted Wass	Tim Doyle	October 25, 2010	506	8.17
55	7	"Mannequin Head Ball"	Ted Wass	Michael A. Ross	November 1, 2010	508	8.69
56	8	"Les-bro"	Ted Wass	Gloria Calderon Kellett	November 8, 2010	507	8.19
57	9	"The Big Picture"	Ted Wass	Becky Mann & Audra Sielaff	November 15, 2010	509	7.92
58	10	"Fun Run"	Ted Wass	Tom Hertz	November 22, 2010	510	7.96
59	11	"Refusing to Budget"	Ted Wass	Mike Sikowitz	December 6, 2010	511	8.78
60	12	"Little Bummer Boy"	Ted Wass	Christopher Shiple	December 13, 2010	512	9.59
61	13	"The Home Stretch"	Gail Mancuso	Lance Whinery	January 3, 2011	513	9.76
62	14	"Uh-Oh It's Magic"	Gail Mancuso	Vanessa McCarthy	January 17, 2011	514	9.89
63	15	"Singing and Dancing"	Gail Mancuso	Tim Doyle	February 7, 2011	515	9.41
64	16	"Jeff Day"	Gail Mancuso	Barry Wernick	February 24, 2011	517	9.45
65	17	"Zygote"	Gail Mancuso	Michael A. Ross	March 3, 2011	518	8.24
66	18	"Anniversary Chicken"	Gail Mancuso	Mike Haukom	March 10, 2011	516	9.40
67	19	"The Set Up"	Leonard R. Garner Jr.	Gloria Calderon Kellett	March 31, 2011	519	8.25
68	20	"Beating the System"	Victor Gonzalez	Becky Mann & Audra Sielaff	April 7, 2011	520	8.69
69	21	"The Jeff Photo"	Tom Hertz	Tom Hertz	April 28, 2011	521	7.86
70	22	"Double Down"	Ted Wass	Mike Sikowitz	May 5, 2011	523	7.72
71	23	"The Power Couple"	Gail Mancuso	Vanessa McCarthy	May 12, 2011	522	8.16
72	24	"The Last of the Red Hat Lovers"	Tom Hertz	Story by : Andy Roth; Teleplay by : Michael A. Ross	May 19, 2011	526	8.80

=== Season 6 (2011–12) ===
No. overall	No. in season	Title	Directed by	Written by	Original release date	Prod. code	US viewers (millions)
73	1	"Dirty Talk"	Ted Wass	Mike Sikowitz	October 20, 2011	603	11.45
74	2	"Bros Before Nodes"	Ted Wass	Michael A. Ross	October 27, 2011	604	10.62
75	3	"Audrey is Dumb"	Tom Hertz	Tom Hertz	November 3, 2011	601	11.81
76	4	"Nature Calls"	Ted Wass	Mike Haukom	November 10, 2011	606	11.57
77	5	"Shy Dial"	Ted Wass	Tim Doyle	November 17, 2011	605	10.90
78	6	"Cheating"	Tom Hertz	Tim Doyle	December 8, 2011	524	9.95
79	7	"The Chair"	Ted Wass	Mike Haukom	December 15, 2011	611	9.53
80	8	"Scavenger Hunt"	Mark Cendrowski	Mike Haukom	March 29, 2012 (Note: This episode was available prior to its airdate on the Season 5 DVD released on February 7, 2012, as it was produced during that season.)	525	8.65
81	9	"A Big Bust"	Leonard R. Garner Jr.	Gloria Calderon Kellett	April 5, 2012	610	8.58
82	10	"After the Lovin'"	Ted Wass	Tom Hertz	April 12, 2012	613	8.46
83	11	"Missed Connections"	Tom Hertz	Christopher Shiple	April 19, 2012	607	7.57
84	12	"The Five Things"	Ted Wass	Dan Kopelman	April 26, 2012	609	8.17
85	13	"Meat Wars"	Ted Wass	Lance Whinery	May 3, 2012	612	8.88
86	14	"Goodbye Dolly"	Ted Wass	Becky Mann & Audra Sielaff	May 10, 2012	602	8.77
87	15	"Audrey's Shower"	Ted Wass	Vanessa McCarthy	May 17, 2012	608	7.17

=== Season 7 (2013) ===
No. overall	No. in season	Title	Directed by	Written by	Original release date	Prod. code	US viewers (millions)
88	1	"Liz Moves In"	Ted Wass	Dan Kopelman	February 4, 2013	703	9.40
89	2	"Taking Names"	Ted Wass	Mike Sikowitz	February 11, 2013	706	8.39
90	3	"Cats & Dogs"	Doug Robinson	Christopher Shiple	February 18, 2013	709	8.19
91	4	"Cupcake"	Ted Wass	Vanessa McCarthy	February 25, 2013	708	7.89
92	5	"Fountain of Youth"	Ted Wass	Mike Sikowitz	March 4, 2013	707	6.92
93	6	"Baby Talk"	Tom Hertz	Tim Doyle	March 11, 2013	701	7.05
94	7	"Role Play"	Ted Wass	Lance Whinery	March 18, 2013	705	6.78
95	8	"Catering"	Tom Hertz	Vanessa McCarthy	March 25, 2013	704	6.30
96	9	"Cooking Class"	Ted Wass	Michael A. Ross	April 15, 2013	702	6.11
97	10	"Unpleasant Surprises"	Gail Mancuso	Andy Roth	April 22, 2013	711	5.11
98	11	"Timmy Quits"	Megyn Price	Mike Haukom	April 29, 2013	712	6.21
99	12	"A Wee Problem"	Carlos Pinero	Gloria Calderon Kellett	May 6, 2013	710	6.74
100	13	"100th"	Tom Hertz	Tom Hertz	May 20, 2013	713	6.25

== Ratings ==
Rules of Engagement : U.S. viewers per episode (millions)

Season	Episode number																							
Season	1	2	3	4	5	6	7	8	9	10	11	12	13	14	15	16	17	18	19	20	21	22	23	24
1	14.84	13.43	13.86	13.57	12.51	11.47	9.26	–																
2	12.23	10.09	10.68	10.81	10.82	11.24	10.77	11.46	11.48	10.40	10.57	10.31	10.39	10.62	12.29	–								
3	11.82	9.95	11.42	11.03	11.02	11.60	10.59	11.30	11.33	6.30	10.14	7.50	12.87	–										
4	9.73	10.07	7.70	8.48	10.79	7.04	7.36	7.49	6.83	7.21	8.18	7.71	8.23	–										
5	8.35	8.15	8.43	7.99	7.86	8.17	8.69	8.19	7.92	7.96	8.78	9.59	9.76	9.89	9.41	9.45	8.24	9.40	8.25	8.69	7.86	7.72	8.16	8.80
6	11.45	10.62	11.81	11.57	10.90	9.95	9.53	8.65	8.58	8.46	7.57	8.17	8.88	8.77	7.17	–								
7	9.40	8.39	8.19	7.89	6.92	7.05	6.78	6.30	6.11	5.11	6.21	6.74	6.25	–										

Audience measurement performed by Nielsen Media Research
