= Ryan Jaso =

American music executive

- Born: Long Beach, California
- Occupation: CEO of Super Evil Genius Corp.

Ryan Jaso is an American music executive and artist manager in the electronic dance music scene and the broader music industry. Jaso is the co-founder of CONTROL, a dance music club based in Los Angeles, and is the chief executive officer of Super Evil Genius Corp., a marketing agency.

== Early life and education ==
Ryan Jaso was born to Jerry and M'Liss Jaso on May 16, 1983. His father was a high school football coach for 38 years. Jaso graduated from Huntington Beach High School before going to Orange Coast College and Golden West College, starting on his ambitions in music soon thereafter.

== Career ==
After moving to Los Angeles at age 21, Jaso formed Whitelite Productions with his partner Chris Alba in 2006. Through Whitelite, Jaso and his partner booked Steve Aoki, Afrika Bambaataa, Datarock, DJ Klever, and DJ Falcon for their first monthly series of events called "Made You Look" in Costa Mesa. Concurrently, Jaso and his partner launched a Sunday party in Los Angeles where they brought acts like Miami Horror, Nosaj Thing, and Classixx.

As part of his expanding ambitions in the music industry, Jaso, by himself, launched Technique Management, an artist management company. His first client was Mr. Whiite. Jaso over time then built his roster of artist clients to include many headlining acts including MAKJ, Cold Blank, and Chris James, a singer-songwriter known for his work with deadmau5 on their song, "The Veldt". Jaso eventually moved his management venture over to ATC Management in 2015.

=== CONTROL ===
In 2008, Jaso and Alba launched a dance music club, CONTROL. After initially starting at Avalon Hollywood, it later expanded to Ruby Skye and the DNA Lounge in San Francisco, partnering with Gary Richards, the founder of Hard Events, and companies like iHeartMedia, among others. CONTROL has hosted showcases and headlining tour spots for artists such as Skrillex, Major Lazer, DJ Snake, and Felix Cartal.

In 2017, Jaso launched CONTROL Forever, a multimedia channel and podcast network. Jaso was also the executive producer of the CONTROL Forever podcast High and Dry with hosts Jason Ellis, Mike Catherwood, and Kate Ellis. Past guests include Dr. Drew, David Arquette, Rude Jude, Stephanie Beatriz and Tito Ortiz. The podcast aired 47 episodes from March 2019–February 2020.

=== Super Evil Genius Corp. ===
Jaso and Colby Reis co-founded Super Evil Genius Corp, a music and brand-marketing agency based in Long Beach, California. It has worked with artists and companies including Flume, John Summit, and Live Nation.

== Other work ==
From 2014 to 2016, Jaso managed Steve Angello's label, Size Records, and his underground label "X." Jaso oversaw and signed records for Don Diablo, Shaun Frank, and "Wasted Love", the lead single from Steve Angello's debut album Wild Youth. While at SIZE, Jaso also worked with Ansel Elgort on his DJ project, Ansolo.
