= Rules of Engagement season 5 =

Rules of Engagement
- Season 5
- No. of episodes: 24

Release
- Original network: CBS
- Original release: September 20, 2010 – May 19, 2011

Season chronology
- ← Previous; Season 4 Next → Season 6

The fifth season of the American television comedy series Rules of Engagement premiered on September 20, 2010. It consisted of 24 episodes, each running approximately 22 minutes in length. The fifth season of Rules of Engagement is the only season to receive a full-season order. CBS initially broadcast the fifth season on Mondays at 8:30 pm ET in the United States between How I Met Your Mother and Two and a Half Men. In February, the show moved to 8:30 ET on Thursdays, following The Big Bang Theory.

== Cast ==
=== Main cast ===
- Patrick Warburton as Jeff Bingham
- Megyn Price as Audrey Bingham
- Oliver Hudson as Adam Rhodes
- Bianca Kajlich as Jennifer Morgan
- David Spade as Russell Dunbar
- Adhir Kalyan as Timmy Patel

=== Recurring cast ===
- Diane Sellers as Doreen
- Sara Rue as Brenda
- Wendi McLendon-Covey as Liz
- Taryn Southern as Allison

== Episodes ==
No. overall	No. in season	Title	Directed by	Written by	Original release date	Prod. code	US viewers (millions)
49	1	"Surro-gate"	Ted Wass	Tom Hertz	September 20, 2010	503	8.35
Jeff and Audrey's idea of the perfect candidate (Jaime Pressly, as Pam) to serve as their surrogate is ruined by Russell's fling with her. Meanwhile, Adam starts working out. Featuring Wayne Lopez as Oscar the doorman.
50	2	"The Bank"	Ted Wass	Mike Sikowitz	September 27, 2010	502	8.15
Audrey is upset after finding out that Jeff has been keeping track of her mistakes for years, strategically using them against her when she gets mad at him. Jeff reveals his technique to Adam, who tries it with Jennifer - to less-than-effective results. Meanwhile, Timmy falls for a coworker (Taryn Southern) - and gets some inappropriate help from Russell in pursuing her..
51	3	"Rug-of-War"	Ted Wass	Barry Wernick	October 4, 2010	501	8.43
When Jeff and Audrey decide to purchase a new rug, they give their old and "broken in" one to Jennifer and Adam. Jeff and Audrey try to go to an adoption fair and end up with big confusion. Featuring Jim Meskimen as the adoption fair coordinator.
52	4	"Handy Man"	Ted Wass	Mike Haukom	October 11, 2010	504	7.99
When his love life doesn't move at the desired pace, Jeff takes matters "into his own hands," which makes Audrey want to spice things up. Russell invites Timmy on a trip to Miami, but doesn't tell Timmy that he's afraid of flying. Featuring Beth Littleford as Laura, and Susan Yeagley as Tracy, both co-workers of Audrey's.
53	5	"Play Ball"	Ted Wass	Vanessa McCarthy	October 18, 2010	505	7.86
Audrey is too busy with work and Jeff convinces her to play softball. After a game full of interruptions from work, she quits her job. Timmy gets frustrated when he is "cut off" by his new girlfriend. Adam and Jennifer try to make up a good story about how they met. Featuring Taryn Southern as Allison.
54	6	"Baked"	Ted Wass	Tim Doyle	October 25, 2010	506	8.17
Trying to find her calling in life after quitting her job, Audrey decides to start a cookie business. Meanwhile, Jennifer and Adam discover marijuana in an old storage box, and become more "baked" than Audrey's cookies. Featuring Taryn Southern as Allison.
55	7	"Mannequin Head Ball"	Ted Wass	Michael A. Ross	November 1, 2010	508	8.69
Jeff and Adam use Audrey's rented retail space for a game of mannequin head ball. Jennifer and Audrey also enjoy their game through a security camera. Meanwhile, Russell and Timmy go on a double-date. Featuring Taryn Southern as Allison and Mariah Bonner as Margaux.
56	8	"Les-bro"	Ted Wass	Gloria Calderon Kellett	November 8, 2010	507	8.19
Audrey and Jeff become tired of finding a surrogate, but Jeff's lesbian friend & teammate, Brenda (Sara Rue), agrees to help them out. Adam is desperate to have a boys' night out, but ends up stuck in the elevator. Russell's mother, Bunny (Joan Collins), comes to town with expensive gifts, but leaves after cutting off Russell from his trust fund. Featuring Rebel Wilson and Debra Azar as potential surrogates whom Jeff insults; Casey Sander as Frank the doorman.
57	9	"The Big Picture"	Ted Wass	Becky Mann & Audra Sielaff	November 15, 2010	509	7.92
Audrey, upset by her appearance in a photograph belonging to Jeff's boss Larry (Holmes Osborne), decides to replace the picture. Meanwhile, Russell is trying to cut his expenditures and temporarily moves in with Timmy. Featuring Odessa Rae and J.R. Nutt as hippies hanging out at Timmy's place.
58	10	"Fun Run"	Ted Wass	Tom Hertz	November 22, 2010	510	7.96
Jeff, tired of co-workers asking for donations, informs his employees that he will no longer take part in their charities. He soon regrets this, however, when Audrey needs donations from his coworkers for her 10K charity run. Meanwhile, Russell dates a woman (Bree Turner as Heather) who gives him a very familiar series of excuses. Featuring Brooklyn McLinn as Dan, Jeff's coworker; Ben Hermes as Gordon, Heather's gay friend.
59	11	"Refusing to Budget"	Ted Wass	Mike Sikowitz	December 6, 2010	511	8.78
Timmy tries to teach Russell to budget his money now that his mother has cut him off. In order to try to impress an old friend (Elaine Hendrix as Stephanie), Audrey pretends that she's still at her old job and attempts to mentor an aspiring fashion writer (Vanessa Lengies as Julie). Meanwhile, Adam tries to get Jennifer to stop cracking her knuckles. Featuring Dawn Olivieri as Cheyenne, Russell's date; Teri Reeves as Janine, restaurant hostess; Mitzi Kapture as Gina, magazine publisher.
60	12	"Little Bummer Boy"	Ted Wass	Christopher Shiple	December 13, 2010	512	9.59
Audrey attempts to prove she is the funny one in her relationship with Jeff, at Jeff's office Christmas party. Meanwhile, Russell dresses Timmy as an elf, in yet another way to embarrass him, and Adam's gifts to Jennifer are handed out to his co-workers.
61	13	"The Home Stretch"	Gail Mancuso	Lance Whinery	January 3, 2011	513	9.76
Adam reveals his cheerleading past to Jennifer, which embarrasses her a lot. Russell and Timmy fight for the affections of the new waitress at the Island Diner. Jeff is upset when he discovers that Audrey's new Pilates instructor is a guy.
62	14	"Uh-Oh It's Magic"	Gail Mancuso	Vanessa McCarthy	January 17, 2011	514	9.89
Russell makes Timmy babysit his new girlfriend's son, while he and the woman go to the Criss Angel show. Jeff and Audrey double-date Brenda and her partner, Becky. Audrey lets out the surrogate news, and Becky is very upset because Brenda hasn't told her yet. Adam tries to prove to Jennifer that he can fix things around the house. Guest stars: Sara Rue, Criss Angel.
63	15	"Singing and Dancing"	Gail Mancuso	Tim Doyle	February 7, 2011	515	9.41
Russell expresses his wish to join Timmy's singing group, but later backs off. Audrey and Jeff try their best to avoid their annoying neighbor, Liz. Guest stars: SoCal VoCals, Wendi McLendon-Covey.
64	16	"Jeff Day"	Gail Mancuso	Barry Wernick	February 24, 2011	517	9.45
Jeff's day off is interrupted by the presence of his maid. Meanwhile, Adam tries to find out what's causing his eye twitch. Timmy tries to mess with Russell's date by calling her and speaking in Russell's voice. Audrey starts her new job.
65	17	"Zygote"	Gail Mancuso	Michael A. Ross	March 3, 2011	518	8.24
Jeff and Audrey find a zygote when visiting the fertility specialist with their surrogate. Adam impersonates Jeff to receive an order of Omaha Steaks. Meanwhile, Russell and Timmy double date WNBA basketball players. Guest stars: Sara Rue, Kalena Ranoa, Noelle Bellinghausen.
66	18	"Anniversary Chicken"	Gail Mancuso	Mike Haukom	March 10, 2011	516	9.40
After Jeff stuns Audrey by remembering their wedding date, the surprise is on Jeff. Meanwhile, Timmy helps Russell on a date with a sexy Italian woman. Guest star: Moran Atias.
67	19	"The Set Up"	Leonard R. Garner Jr.	Gloria Calderon Kellett	March 31, 2011	519	8.25
In an attempt to ditch Liz, their annoying neighbor, Jeff and Audrey set her up with a guy from Jeff's office. Adam begins working out at a new kind of gym. Meanwhile, Timmy forbids Russell from having any form of contact with his sister. Guest stars: Larry Joe Campbell, Wendi McLendon-Covey, Melanie Kannokada.
68	20	"Beating the System"	Victor Gonzalez	Becky Mann & Audra Sielaff	April 7, 2011	520	8.69
Jeff gets a rude awakening when he assumes that the surrogate pregnancy will give him the best of both worlds. Timmy takes over as planner for Adam and Jennifer's wedding. Guest star: Sara Rue.
69	21	"The Jeff Photo"	Tom Hertz	Tom Hertz	April 28, 2011	521	7.86
Jeff tries to regain his youthful appearance after discovering an old photograph of himself, which encourages Adam to take a current photo of himself. Russell and Liz both feel embarrassment the day after sleeping together. Guest star: Wendi McLendon-Covey.
70	22	"Double Down"	Ted Wass	Mike Sikowitz	May 5, 2011	523	7.72
Jeff and Audrey fear the possibility of having twins. Russell throws a "citizenship party" for Timmy to impress a girl. Guest star: Sara Rue.
71	23	"The Power Couple"	Gail Mancuso	Vanessa McCarthy	May 12, 2011	522	8.16
Jeff has a hard time accepting Audrey's raise. While feigning disinterest, Russell is curious about Liz's "other man". Guest stars: Wendi McLendon-Covey, Larry Joe Campbell.
72	24	"The Last of the Red Hat Lovers"	Tom Hertz	Story by : Andy Roth; Teleplay by : Michael A. Ross	May 19, 2011	526	8.80
Russell goes on a cruise to meet what he thinks are potential "hot young" lovers. As the ship sets sail, he discovers the cruise has been booked by members of the Red Hat Society. Audrey and Jeff have to stay elsewhere while their apartment is being painted. Adam and Jennifer ruin the paint job as well as Jeff and Audrey's couch.

== Ratings ==
Episode #	Title	Air Date	Rating	Share	18-49	Viewers
1	Surro-gate	September 20, 2010	5.2	8	3.1/8	8.35 million
2	The Bank	September 27, 2010	5.0	7	3.2/8	8.15 million
3	Rug-of-War	October 4, 2010	5.1	8	3.0/8	8.43 million
4	Handy Man	October 11, 2010	4.9	7	3.0/8	7.99 million
5	Play Ball	October 18, 2010	4.8	7	2.9/8	7.86 million
6	Baked	October 25, 2010	4.9	7	3.0/8	8.17 million
7	Mannequin Head Ball	November 1, 2010	5.2	8	3.4/9	8.69 million
8	Les-bro	November 8, 2010	5.0	7	3.0/8	8.19 million
9	The Big Picture	November 15, 2010	4.9	7	2.9/7	7.92 million
10	Fun Run	November 22, 2010	4.7	7	2.9/8	7.96 million
11	Refusing to Budget	December 6, 2010	5.4	8	3.1/8	8.78 million
12	Little Bummer Boy	December 13, 2010	5.7	9	3.2/8	9.59 million
13	The Home Stretch	January 3, 2011	5.9	9	3.4/9	9.76 million
14	Uh-Oh It's Magic	January 17, 2011	6.0	9	3.3/8	9.89 million
15	Singing and Dancing	February 7, 2011	5.7	9	3.2/8	9.41 million
16	Jeff Day	February 24, 2011	5.7	9	2.8/8	9.45 million
17	Zygote	March 3, 2011	5.0	8	2.4/7	8.24 million
18	Anniversary Chicken	March 10, 2011	5.7	9	2.8/8	9.40 million
19	The Set Up	March 31, 2011	5.1	8	2.4/7	8.25 million
20	Beating The System	April 7, 2011	5.3	9	2.6/8	8.69 million
21	The Jeff Photo	April 28, 2011	4.8	7	2.3/7	7.86 million
22	Double Down	May 5, 2011	4.8	7	2.2/7	7.72 million
23	The Power Couple	May 12, 2011	6.1	TBA	2.5/7	8.16 million
24	The Last of the Red Hat Lovers	May 19, 2011	5.9	TBA	2.5/7	8.80 million
