= Rules of Engagement (TV series) =

American television sitcom (2007–2013)

- Genre: Sitcom
- Created by: Tom Hertz
- Starring: Patrick Warburton; Megyn Price; Oliver Hudson; Bianca Kajlich; David Spade; Adhir Kalyan
- Music by: Bert Selen; Evan Frankfort; George Ritter
- Opening theme: "How Many Ways" by Señor Happy
- Country of origin: United States
- Original language: English
- No. of seasons: 7
- No. of episodes: 100 (list of episodes)

Production
- Executive producers: Cheri Tanimura; Jack Giarraputo; Tom Hertz; Barbara Stoll; Vanessa McCarthy; Doug Robinson; Adam Sandler
- Cinematography: Wayne Kennan
- Editor: Michael Karlich
- Camera setup: Multi-camera
- Running time: 21 minutes
- Production companies: Game Six Productions; Happy Madison Productions; CBS Paramount Network Television (2007–09); CBS Television Studios; Sony Pictures Television

Original release
- Network: CBS
- Release: February 5, 2007 – May 20, 2013

Rules of Engagement is an American television sitcom created by Tom Hertz that ran on CBS from February 5, 2007, to May 20, 2013, originally airing as a mid-season replacement. The series was produced by Adam Sandler's Happy Madison Productions in association with CBS Television Studios and Sony Pictures Television (SPT controls the North American rights while CBS controls the international rights).

Although the show received negative reviews throughout its run, it earned 3 Primetime Emmy Award nominations and always earned reasonably good ratings, helping the show reach 100 episodes (typically the minimum needed for syndication) over seven seasons.

== Premise ==
Two couples and their single friend deal with the complications of dating, promise and marriage. It portrays different interpersonal relationships in various stages, starring Patrick Warburton and Megyn Price as a long-married couple, Oliver Hudson and Bianca Kajlich as newly engaged sweethearts, and David Spade and Adhir Kalyan (the latter added in season 3) as their still-single friends. They often meet at "The Island Diner."

== History ==
The show was heavily promoted by CBS during Super Bowl XLI and launched the following night, the first of seven episodes in its first season. The pilot episode remains the highest rated episode of the show. The series was renewed for a second season, which began as a mid-season replacement for The New Adventures of Old Christine on Monday, September 24, 2007, with production halted after nine episodes on November 6, 2007, in the wake of a writers' strike. After the strike ended, CBS announced that the show would return April 14, 2008, with a further six episodes.

Seasons three and four were both mid-season entries launched in March 2009 and March 2010. On May 18, 2010, it was announced that CBS had renewed Rules of Engagement for a 5th season. It was later announced that this season would start in September, in contrast to its usual midseason start, and received an expanded 24-episode order. (The fifth season was the only season to have a full-season order.) The first 15 episodes aired on Monday nights, usually in the 8:30 pm Eastern/7:30 pm Central time slot following How I Met Your Mother. Then on February 24, 2011, the series moved to Thursdays at 8:30 pm Eastern/7:30 pm Central, following The Big Bang Theory, after the cancellation of $#*! My Dad Says. On January 31, 2011, CBS ordered an additional two episodes of the series to prepare for the possibility of Two and a Half Men going into hiatus following Charlie Sheen's real-life issues, taking the episode order to 26. Two of these episodes were held back and aired as part of the sixth season.

On May 17, 2011, the series was renewed for a sixth season to begin airing in fall 2011. One day later, CBS announced that Rules of Engagement would move to Saturday nights at 8:00 pm Eastern/7:00 pm Central as part of the network's new Comedytime Saturday block; the first time in six years that an original CBS program would air on that night. It also marked the fourth night on which the series would air, with it previously airing on Mondays, Wednesdays (two airings), and Thursdays. On October 7, 2011, however, it was announced that Rules of Engagement would move back to its 8:30PM EST Thursday timeslot following The Big Bang Theory, replacing new sitcom How to Be a Gentleman which was moved to the new Saturday time slot. The episode order was cut from the original 18, down to 13 (plus two unaired episodes from season five) on November 14, 2011.

Effective January 12, 2012, CBS removed Rules of Engagement from its Thursday lineup, replacing it with the new sitcom Rob starring Rob Schneider. Rules would return to its Thursday 8:30 PM time slot on March 29, after Rob had finished airing its 8-episode order, resulting in a total of 15 episodes in season 6.

On May 21, 2012, CBS renewed Rules of Engagement for a seventh season of 13 episodes to air mid-season, bringing the total number of produced 100 episodes. Season 7 began airing on Mondays at 8:30, starting February 4, 2013.

On May 10, 2013, Rules of Engagement was cancelled by CBS after seven seasons and 100 episodes. The series finale episode aired on May 20, 2013.

== Cast and characters ==
=== Main characters ===
- Patrick Warburton as Jeff Bingham, a financial manager and husband of Audrey since August 12, 1995. He has a rather deadpan, cold and sardonic personality and sense of self, particularly when dealing with Russell and Adam, but he is not sadistic or unkind, thereby rendering these traits as merely ironic and biting humor. He loves sports (New York Giants, New York Mets, New York Rangers, New York Knicks), shuns anything that might resemble sensitivity and often views his marriage as a competition or war, refusing to let Audrey "win" the upper hand at anything. He frequently complains about Audrey's work stories being boring, often forgets plans they have made or tasks she has asked him to complete and, on many occasions, embarrasses her publicly. He is also very frugal and extremely careful with his money – to the extent that he will buy socks in New Jersey to avoid paying additional tax on them – and tries to discourage Audrey from overspending while planning for their future. He often reminisces about his college days at Syracuse University.
- Megyn Price as Audrey Bingham (née Curtis), formerly from Lincoln, Nebraska, an editor at Indoor Living magazine (before later resigning, briefly working as a hostess, and eventually working as a project manager at a gaming design company) and the assertive, modern wife of Jeff. She likes to do things on spur of the moment, such as when she buys furniture on the Internet or makes Jeff's shirts into a quilt. She tolerates her husband's insensitivity because she knows he is not malicious and will do whatever it takes to make the situation right once he realizes his mistake. As a couple, they both can be very condescending and manipulative towards each other, in order to gain the upper hand, and typically don't like to concede to the other that they were wrong, for example, they both repeatedly lied about their whereabouts during a weekend when Audrey's aunt was supposed to visit but fell ill and Jeff was supposed to be at a bachelor party weekend but the bride cancelled the wedding. They, however, often recognize where both were wrong and apologize. Audrey does not make fun of her friends as much as her friends make fun of each other, but she will frequently save her most-biting criticisms for Russell. She often insists that she is a "people person", but her attempts to prove it usually result in embarrassment, such as having a co-worker lodge a sexual harassment complaint against her. Audrey likes to think of herself as kind, cultured and smarter than her friends. She desperately wants to be liked by persons and/or impress them, but her attempts at being charitable and sociable often end in her becoming frustrated, either as a result of her own awkwardness or due to Jeff's manners. She and Jeff had a baby, Shea, via a surrogate, Brenda, after Audrey assumed she could never get pregnant, only to discover in the series finale that she is in fact pregnant with Jeff's child.
- Oliver Hudson as Adam Rhodes, a sensitive and well-meaning – but extremely naive – co-worker of Russell and Timmy, and Jennifer's fiancé throughout the series until they are married in the series finale. He is a neighbor of Jeff and Audrey, looks up to Jeff, and often acts on Jeff's relationship advice (which is hardened by years of marriage) to attempt to receive more frequent sexual relations with Jennifer. This usually results in making the situation worse for himself. As an example, he once revealed to Jennifer his strategies for avoiding her bad moods, because he was proud that Jeff considered them to be a good idea. Oftentimes because of his childlike naivete (almost borderline stupidity), people find it hard to explain things to him. He cannot keep secrets and rarely thinks before he speaks. Adam frequently exhibits feminine or flamboyant behavior and characteristics, which make him the target of many barbs from Jeff and Russell regarding his tendencies. Adam, initially, was simply a smooth, charming guy who was only a bit simple, but over the course of the series, noticeably after Season 2, the writers opted to "dumb-down" his character turning him from naive and sweet to borderline moronic and dim-witted.
- Bianca Kajlich as Jennifer Morgan, the charismatic live-in fiancée and eventual wife of Adam, who endures his faults because of his good looks and underlying good nature. She is very self-conscious of his naivete, and will often try to spare him from embarrassment. She also has a need for thrills and can easily manipulate Adam into doing whatever she wants, but often feels guilty about it afterward. She was openly promiscuous in her past and is often referred to by Jeff, Russell and even Adam as being "easy" and always "good to go". Her love for sex means Adam rarely has to "work for it", a fact that Adam enjoys and the guys envy. Jennifer did, however, attempt to fabricate a clichéd love story of how she and Adam met, due to being slightly embarrassed when Adam continually boasts that they had sex together on their first date. She and Adam are often naive about their relationship as they typically assume they will not end up bickering and resenting each other like Jeff & Audrey, who often laugh at them for being so clueless and optimistic, and they think will be able to agree on everything. However, despite their best efforts, this often backfires specifically when they tried working together, cutting back on expenses or when they got into a big fight while trying to plan their entire future during a weekend getaway.
- David Spade as Russell Dunbar, an acerbic, narcissistic, lothario single friend of the main characters and boss of Adam and Timmy. Russell is fast-talking, and is an eternal optimist when it comes to women, often ignoring multiple sexual harassment lawsuits leveled against him. He is also an incompetent manager at his father's real estate and development business, Dunbar Industries. If left to his own devices and forced to fend for himself without assistance (e.g., from Timmy) he would completely destroy his office in minutes. He is often mocked because of his height (especially by Jeff), choice of wardrobe, hair style, and his penchant for prostitution (frequently alluded to, but never during the series is he shown to be with a prostitute) and young women with "daddy" issues. He also frequently uses his wealth to lure women and do whatever he wants. In the Season 6 episode "Audrey's Shower", Russell takes a break from women and starts to display many creative talents. It is revealed in a flashback that he was an intelligent child and a musical prodigy, until he saw his piano teacher's cleavage and wound up taking a different path in life. His favorite expression, spoken in a high-pitched voice after incredulous questions about his doing something outrageous, is: "I kinda did" (or, when mocking someone else – usually Timmy or Adam: "Ya kinda are"). In the series finale, Russell proposes to Timmy and marries him in order to help Timmy avoid deportation.
- Adhir Kalyan as Timir "Timmy" Patel (recurring Season 3; regular cast from Seasons 4–7), whom Russell hires as his assistant. He is a mild-mannered man with a quick wit, often matching Russell's jabs in their verbal sparring. Although he is fluent in seven languages and holds an MBA from University of Oxford, Timmy is often forced to do menial work or to solve Russell's trivial problems. While many of Russell's schemes disgust him, Timmy will often see them through so that he can enjoy Russell's comeuppance. He plays cricket and is also an avid fan of the Boston Bruins. In the series finale, Timmy's work visa expires and he faces deportation. Russell sets aside his womanizing ways to marry Timmy so he can stay in the country.

=== Recurring characters and notable guests ===
- Diane Sellers as Doreen, waitress at The Island Diner.
- Wendi McLendon-Covey as Liz, a quirky, "plain Jane" neighbor and friend of Audrey's (and Audrey's first boss) who lives directly upstairs from the Binghams, and whose mannerisms and conversations frequently repulse Jeff; for a brief story arc in Season 6 she was married to Russell, but they later separated. In Season 7, Episode 7, she admitted to Russell that she is a sex addict and that she cheated on him multiple times (with multiple partners) during their brief marriage.
- Sara Rue as Brenda, Jeff's lesbian softball teammate and beer-drinking pal who agrees to be a surrogate mother for Audrey and Jeff.
- Nazneen Contractor as Suneetha, Timmy's fiancée in an arranged marriage, who becomes an object of Russell's affections.
- Susan Yeagley as Tracy, a man-hungry co-worker of Audrey's.
- Beth Littleford as Laura, another man-hungry co-worker of Audrey's.
- Brooklyn McLinn as Dan, a happily-engaged co-worker of Jeff's.
- Taryn Southern as Allison, the object of Timmy's affections, which blossoms into an intra-office romance, then ends when she moves away and breaks up with Timmy.
- Geoff Pierson as Franklin Dunbar, Russell's wealthy, lecherous father.
- Orlando Jones as Brad, Jeff's gay friend from his gym and softball team who eventually makes friends with the rest of the gang.
- Sam Harris as Jackie, Brad's flamboyantly gay partner, whom Audrey becomes good friends with before Jeff causes Audrey to inadvertently insult him, ending the friendship.
- Larry Joe Campbell as Todd, a friendly but socially-awkward co-worker of Jeff's whom Audrey fixes up with Liz.
- Jaime Pressly as Pam Nelson, the Bingham's initial surrogate whom they soon soured on due to her sleeping with Russell.
- Heather Locklear as Barbara, Audrey's sister, on whom Russell has a crush.
- Bob Odenkirk as Mike, an old friend of Jeff's who he reconnects with at a boat show, and whose news of a divorce gives Jeff pause regarding his relationship with Audrey.
- Joan Collins as Bunny Dunbar, Russell's wealthy, superficial mother.
- Brian Dennehy as Roy Bingham, Jeff's very traditional father.
- Peggy Lipton as Faye, Adam's free-spirited mother.
- Ajay Mehta and Anna George as Rahm & Varsha Patel, Timmy's parents.
- Richard McGonagle as Dr Sachs, whom Jeff & Audrey see to further their hopes of having a child.
- Curtis Armstrong as an insecure version of himself, who bonds with Adam and enjoys Adam's adoration.
- Jessica Walter as Constance, an older woman whom Russell had sex with when he was 18.
- Tony Hale as Steve, a quirky former co-worker of Jeff's who is known as "the nuzzler" for his awkward hugs.
- Mark Saul and Tommy Snider as Barry and Tug, Audrey's goofy and immature bosses at a gaming design company.
- Wayne Lopez as Oscar, one of the doormen at the building where the Binghams, Adam, and Jen live.
- Casey Sander as Frank, another doorman at Jeff & Audrey's building.

== Episodes ==
Season	Episodes	Originally released	
Season	Episodes	First released	Last released
1	7	February 5, 2007	March 19, 2007
2	15	September 24, 2007	May 19, 2008
3	13	March 2, 2009	May 18, 2009
4	13	March 1, 2010	May 24, 2010
5	24	September 20, 2010	May 19, 2011
6	15	October 20, 2011	May 17, 2012
7	13	February 4, 2013	May 20, 2013

== U.S. ratings ==
Season	Time slot (EST)	Number of episodes	Premiere		Finale		TV season	Overall rank	Viewers (in millions)
Season	Time slot (EST)	Number of episodes	Date	Viewers (in millions)	Date	Viewers (in millions)	TV season	Overall rank	Viewers (in millions)
1	Monday 9:30 p.m.	7	February 5, 2007	14.83	March 19, 2007	9.26	2006–07	25th	12.38
2	Monday 9:30 p.m.	15	September 24, 2007	12.23	May 19, 2008	12.29	2007–08	33rd	10.89
3	Monday 9:30 p.m.	13	March 2, 2009	11.82	May 18, 2009	12.87	2008–09	24th	11.37
4	Monday 8:30 p.m.	13	March 1, 2010	9.73	May 24, 2010	8.23	2009–10	50th	7.91
5	Monday 8:30 p.m. (2010–11); Thursday 8:30 p.m. (2011)	24	September 20, 2010	8.35	May 19, 2011	8.80	2010–11	49th	8.77
6	Thursday 8:30 p.m.	15	October 20, 2011	11.45	May 17, 2012	7.17	2011–12	42nd	10.10
7	Monday 8:30 p.m.	13	February 4, 2013	9.40	May 20, 2013	6.25	2012–13	52nd	7.69

== Syndication ==
In June 2011, the series was picked up for syndication by local network affiliates, The CW Plus, and WGN America, making its debut on September 10, 2012. On January 2, 2013, the series began airing weekdays on TBS. On January 1, 2026, Rewind TV began broadcasting the show, airing weeknights at 12am ET and Sundays from 4pm to 6pm ET. All 7 seasons were available for streaming on Netflix until September 2018 when they were removed. The Roku Channel offers all 7 seasons for free. As of October 2024 all seven seasons of Rules of Engagement are available for streaming via subscription on Amazon Prime Video.

In Canada, the series is syndicated on CMT.

== Awards and nominations ==
Year	Award	Category	Recipient(s)	Result
2007	Primetime Emmy Award	Outstanding Cinematography for a Multi-Camera Series	Wayne Kennan	Nominated
2007	Teen Choice Award	Choice TV Actor: Comedy	David Spade	Nominated
2008	Art Directors Guild Award	Excellence in Production Design	Bernard Vyzga and Lynn Griffin	Nominated
2008	BMI Film & TV Awards	Best TV Music	David Schwartz	Won
2009	BMI Film & TV Awards	Best TV Music	Evan Frankfort, Bert Selen, and George Ritter	Won
2009	Art Directors Guild Award	Excellence in Production Design	Bernard Vyzga, Joe Pew, and Jerie Kelter	Nominated
2009	ASCAP Film and Television Music Award	Top Television Series	Steve Mazur, Tom Polce, and Derek Schanche	Won
2010	Primetime Emmy Award	Outstanding Art Direction for a Multi-Camera Series	Bernard Vyzga an Jerie Kelter	Nominated
2011	Primetime Emmy Award	Outstanding Art Direction for a Multi-Camera Series	Bernard Vyzga an Jerie Kelter	Nominated
2011	Primetime Emmy Award	Outstanding Cinematography for a Multi-Camera Series	Wayne Kennan	Nominated
2012	BMI Film & TV Awards	Best TV Music	Bert Selen and George Ritter	Won
2012	Image Award	Outstanding Directing in a Comedy Series	Leonard R. Garner, Jr.	Won
2013	BMI Film & TV Awards	Best TV Music	Bert Selen and George Ritter	Won

== Home media ==
Sony Pictures Home Entertainment owns the rights to release DVDs in Region 1. The fifth season of the series was made available beginning February 7, 2012, exclusively as a made-on-demand release from Sony Pictures Home Entertainment, in conjunction with amazon.com. Similarly, the sixth season received a MOD release from online retailers, on October 2, 2012.

Paramount Home Entertainment, in conjunction with CBS Home Entertainment, began releasing the series on DVD internationally in 2011. Season One was released in the UK (Region 2 DVD) on April 4, 2011. In region 4, the entire series has been released, as individual season sets.

The entire series is available to purchase and download from Amazon.com and the iTunes Store.

DVD name	Release date	Ep #
The Complete First Season	September 4, 2007	7
The Complete Second Season	October 14, 2008	15
The Complete Third Season	September 14, 2010	13
The Complete Fourth Season	January 11, 2011	13
The Complete Fifth Season	February 7, 2012	26
The Complete Sixth Season	October 2, 2012	13
The Complete Seventh Season	February 18, 2016	13

Note: Following the events of Charlie Sheen's departure from Two and a Half Men, CBS ordered an additional two episodes for Rules of Engagement’s fifth season, bringing the total number of episodes to 26 from the initial 24 ordered. Despite the episodes, "Scavenger Hunt" and "Cheating," airing during the sixth season, they were originally produced for the fifth season, and are included in the fifth season collection. Therefore, the sixth season's DVD release features the 13 episodes produced over that time period, versus the 15 that were broadcast by CBS.

== Polish version ==
Polish channel TVN started filming its own version of the show, called Reguły gry (meaning Rules of the Game in Polish). It premiered on February 16, 2012, on TVN sister channel TVN 7 as its first original production.
