= Bianca Kajlich =

American actress

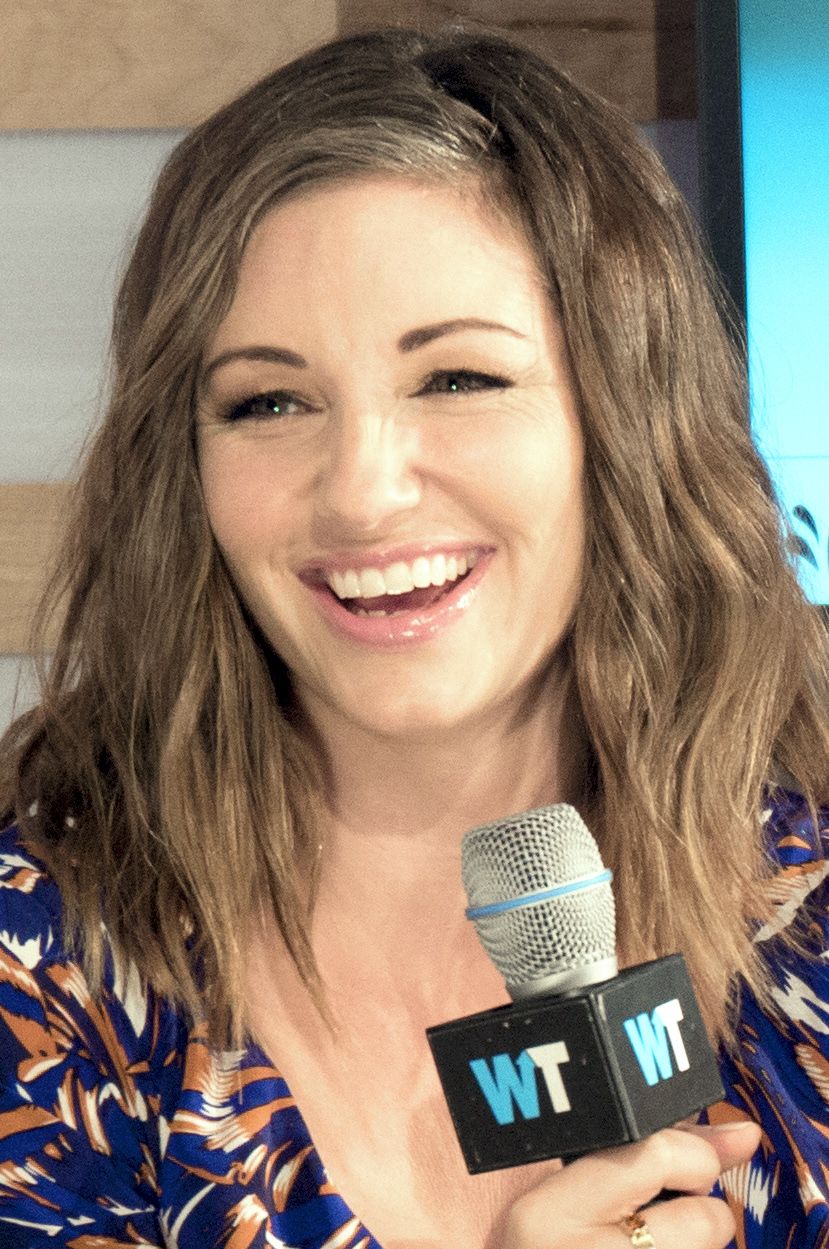
- Kajlich in 2015
- Born: 1977; Seattle, Washington, U.S.
- Occupation: Actress
- Years active: 1999–present
- Spouses: Landon Donovan (m. 2006; div. 2010) Michael Catherwood (m. 2012)
- Children: 1

Bianca Kajlich (/ˈkaɪlɪk/ KY-lik) is an American actress. Kajlich has had starring and supporting roles in television and film including the leading role of Jennifer Morgan on the CBS comedy Rules of Engagement (2007–2013).

Kajlich also starred as final girl Sara Moyer in the horror film Halloween: Resurrection (2002), Leslie Burton on the NBC sitcom Undateable (2014–2016), and Christina Henry on the fifth season of the Prime Video original series Bosch (2019).

== Early life ==
Kajlich was born in Seattle, the daughter of Patti (née Campana) and Dr. Aurel Jan "Relo" Kajlich. Her father was Slovak and her mother is of Italian descent. Her younger brother is Andre Kajlich, a paraplegic athlete who was USA Paratriathlon Athlete of the Year. She attended Bishop Blanchet High School before performing with Olympic Ballet Theatre. She later attended Washington State University.

== Career ==
Kajlich began her career with the Olympic Ballet Theater as a ballet dancer in Edmonds, Washington. After seven years, she decided to try acting. By that time, she had already performed lead roles in The River, Swan Lake, and The Nutcracker. Kajlich's first acting part was in an advertisement for Kragen Auto Parts. She has since appeared in the films Bring It On, 10 Things I Hate About You, Halloween: Resurrection, and 30 Minutes Or Less. Kajlich also had recurring roles in the television series Boston Public as Lisa Grier and in Dawson's Creek as Natasha Kelly, as well as roles in UPN's Rock Me Baby and the Fox drama Vanished.

Kajlich appeared in an episode of the USA Network's Psych entitled "Psy vs. Psy" as a psychic FBI agent who ends up not being who she appears to be. She appeared as a major character in an episode of Fox's short-lived action TV show, Fastlane, as a prostitute named Bree whose pimp wants her dead. Kajlich had a quick appearance as a punk nose-piercing girl in an episode of Freaks and Geeks, and she played Jennifer on the CBS comedy Rules of Engagement. She was ranked No. 74 on the Maxim "Hot 100 Women of 2004" and No. 63 on the Maxim "Hot 100 Women of 2007".

In March 2013, Kajlich was cast as a main character in the NBC sitcom Undateable, which premiered on May 29, 2014, and ended January 29, 2016.

In October 2017, she appeared as Paula, a prostitute befriended with sartorial advice by Larry David in HBO's Curb Your Enthusiasm.

She starred in the Amazon Prime series Bosch as Christina Henry, which completed on June 25, 2021, with its seventh and final season.

== Personal life ==
Kajlich married soccer player Landon Donovan on December 31, 2006. The couple separated in late 2009 and Donovan filed for divorce on December 23, 2010. On December 16, 2012, she married radio personality Michael Catherwood. Kajlich gave birth to the couple's first child, Magnolia, in April 2014.

== Filmography ==
=== Films ===
Year	Title	Role	Notes
1999	10 Things I Hate About You	Coffee Girl	
1999	This Is the Disk-O-Boyz	Mall Girl	
2000	Bring It On	Carver	
2002	Halloween: Resurrection	Sara Moyer	
2011	30 Minutes or Less	'Juicy'	
2011	Hard Love	Katy	
2015	Dark Was the Night	Susan Shields	
2015	Drift	Samantha	Short film

=== Television ===
Year	Film	Role	Notes
1999	Sorority	Roxanne	Television film
2000	Freaks and Geeks	Piercing Girl	"Noshing and Moshing" (Season 1, Episode 15)
2000–01	Boston Public	Lisa Grier	Recurring role (Season 1)
2001	Semper Fi	Sharon Exler	Television film
2002	Fastlane	Sabrina 'Bree' Falson	"Get Your Mack On" (Season 1, Episode 9)
2002	In My Opinion	Lane	Television film
2002–03	Dawson's Creek	Natasha Kelly	Recurring role (Season 6)
2003–04	Rock Me Baby	Beth Cox	Main role
2005	Confession of a Dog	Erika	Television film
2006	Vanished	Anna	Television film
2006	More, Patience	Mia	Television film
2006	In Justice	Angela DiMarco	"Victims" (Season 1, Episode 9)
2006	Vanished	Quinn Keeler	Recurring role
2007	Psych	Lindsay Leikin	"Psy vs. Psy" (Season 2, Episode 3)
2007–13	Rules of Engagement	Jennifer Morgan	Main role
2014–16	Undateable	Leslie Burton	Main role
2017	Curb Your Enthusiasm	Paula	"The Pickle Gambit" (Season 9, Episode 2)
2019	Bosch	Christina Henry	(Season 5, 8 episodes)
2019–2021	Legacies	Sheriff Mac	Recurring role (Season 2–3)
2020	The Unicorn	Danielle	(Episode 1)
2022–2023	The Winchesters	Millie Winchester	Main role
