= Tom Hertz =

American producer and screenwriter

- Occupation(s): Producer, screenwriter

Tom Hertz is an American producer and screenwriter. He is the creator of the American sitcom television series Rules of Engagement. He won a Primetime Emmy Award and was nominated for another one in the category Outstanding Writing for a Variety Series for his work on the television program Dennis Miller Live.
