= List of Cheers characters =

This is a list of characters from the American television sitcom, Cheers.

== Original main characters ==
Before the Cheers pilot, "Give Me a Ring Sometime", was finalized and then aired in 1982, the series originally consisted of four employees of Cheers, the bar, in the original script. There was neither Norm Peterson nor Cliff Clavin, regular customers of Cheers; later revisions added them as part of the series.

=== Sam Malone ===
Samuel "Mayday" Malone (Ted Danson) is a bartender and owner of Cheers. Sam is also a ladies' man. Before the series began, he was a relief pitcher for the Boston Red Sox when he became (and still is) a friend of Coach, but then he became alcoholic, which took a toll on his baseball career. He has on-again, off-again relationships with Diane Chambers, his opposite, in the first five seasons (1982–1987). During the breaks in their relationship, Sam has flings with many not-so-bright "sexy women" but generally doesn't pursue relationships and fails to seduce some intellectual women.

After Diane leaves Boston, he pursues Rebecca Howe, largely unsuccessfully. In the end, he is still unmarried, recovering from sexual addiction with help from Dr. Robert Sutton's (Gilbert Lewis) group meetings, advised by Frasier, in the penultimate episode "The Guy Can't Help It" (1993). Sam Malone was originally written as a former football player, but the casting of Ted Danson led writers to change Sam into an ex-baseball player.

=== Diane Chambers ===
Diane Chambers (Shelley Long) is a highly academic, sophisticated college student. In the pilot, Diane is abandoned by her fiancé Sumner Sloan (Michael McGuire), for whom she'd worked as an assistant, as he returns to his ex-wife. Without a job, money, or man, she reluctantly becomes a cocktail waitress. Over time, she becomes a close friend of Coach. She has an on-and-off relationship with bartender Sam Malone. When not involved with Sam, Diane dates men who fit her upper-class ideals, such as Frasier Crane. Later in the fifth season, she leaves Boston behind for a writing career and in the eleventh and final season lives in Los Angeles.

=== Coach ===
Ernie "Coach" Pantusso (or Pantuso) (Nicholas Colasanto) is a "senile" co-bartender, widower, and retired baseball coach. Coach is also a friend of Sam and a close friend of Diane. He had a daughter, Lisa. Coach was often easily tricked, particularly into situations that put the bar at stake. Nevertheless, he listened to people's problems and offered them advice and analyses. In the fourth season, Coach died without explicit explanation while the actor Colasanto himself died of a heart attack in February 1985.

=== Carla Tortelli ===
Carla Maria Victoria Angelina Teresa Apollonia Lozupone (Rhea Perlman) is a "wisecracking, cynical" cocktail waitress, who abuses customers. At the series premiere, she was the mother of four children and divorced from Nick Tortelli (Dan Hedaya). She believes in superstitions and flirts with men, including ones who are not interested in her, but secretly carries the torch for Sam. She is both highly fertile and matrimonially inept.

Carla's last husband, Eddie LeBec, a washed-up ice hockey goalie whom she married during the run of the show, eventually died in an ice show accident involving a Zamboni. Carla later discovered that Eddie had cheated on her, committing bigamy with another woman whom he had gotten pregnant. Carla's sleazy first husband, Nick Tortelli (Dan Hedaya), also made appearances, variously challenging Carla with a custody battle or a legal scam stemming from their divorce. Carla's eight children, four of whom were born during the show's run, were notoriously ill-behaved, except for Ludlow, whose father was a prominent academic. Perlman's real-life pregnancies were written into the series as Carla's pregnancies.

=== Norm Peterson ===
Hilary Norman Peterson (George Wendt) is a bar regular and semi-unemployed accountant, whose common name "Norm" is often shouted whenever he enters the bar. Outside the bar, he frequently changes jobs and has a troubled marriage with (but is still in love with and married to) Vera, an unseen character. Later in the series, he becomes a house painter, especially for Rebecca's bar office. (Despite a few fleeting appearances and vocal cameos, Vera's body is seen in the fifth-season episode "Thanksgiving Orphans" (1986), but her face is covered with a pumpkin pie. In this appearance, she is played by Bernadette Birkett, the real-life wife of George Wendt.)

Originally, there was no Norm Peterson. Wendt auditioned for a minor role ("George") for the pilot episode, who was Diane Chambers' first customer and had only one word in one line: "Beer!" After he was cast as George, Wendt's role was rewritten into Norm.

=== Cliff Clavin ===
Clifford C. Clavin, Jr. (John Ratzenberger) is a know-it-all bar regular and postman. He mostly lives with his mother, Esther Clavin (Frances Sternhagen), in the family house (until its on-screen destruction in season 6) and then in a condo, although he first purchases the condo as a bachelor pad for himself. He is ridiculed by friends and enemies alike, including Norm and Carla, for his know-it-all attitude. Cliff is mostly hopeless with women. His longest relationship is with fellow postal worker Margaret O'Keefe (Annie Golden), which begins during Cheers' seventh season (1988–89). When Margaret becomes pregnant with another man's child in 1993's "Do Not Forsake Me O My Postman", Cliff stays by her side as the baby's stepfather before Margaret returns to the child's biological father.

In "The Barstoolie" (1985) Cliff meets his father, Cliff Clavin Sr. (Dick O'Neill), who left Cliff and his mother years earlier when Cliff was still a child. Cliff later realizes that his father is a fraudster and a fugitive from justice, and will run off again. Cliff does not want to turn his father in; Cliff Sr. disappears, leaving his son devastated.

Ratzenberger auditioned for the Norm Peterson role but, sensing he would not get the role, Ratzenberger pitched the idea of a bar "know-it-all". The producers loved the idea so the security guard Cliff Clavin was added for the pilot. However, the producers changed his occupation into a postal worker because they perceived postal workers as more knowledgeable than security guards.

== Subsequent main characters ==
Woody Boyd replaced Coach, who died between the third and fourth seasons. Frasier Crane began as a recurring guest role and became a permanent character. Rebecca Howe replaced Diane Chambers, who left Boston for a writing career in 1987. Lilith Sternin started as a one-time character in the Season 4 episode, "Second Time Around" (1986), and became a recurring character in Season 5 (1986–87), and a regular character for Season 10 and the episodes that she appears in for Season 11 (1992–93).

=== Frasier Crane and Lilith Sternin ===
Frasier W. Crane (Kelsey Grammer) and Lilith Sternin (formerly Sternin-Crane) (Bebe Neuwirth) — married psychiatrists and bar regulars, although Lilith rarely orders drinks. Frasier starts out as Diane Chambers' love interest. When she jilts him at the wedding altar in Europe, he ends up frequently going to Cheers pub for drinks and becomes everybody's bar friend. His first date with Lilith in "Second Time Around" (1986), Lilith's only episode of the fourth season, does not go well because they constantly argue. In the fifth season, Frasier and Lilith meet again when they are scheduled for a psychological talk show. With help from Diane, Frasier becomes aroused by Lilith's makeover, especially with her hair down, for the talk show. Frasier and Lilith flirt with each other on the talk show. Although they later feel guilty, Frasier and Lilith overcome their guilt with more help from Diane and begin their relationship.

They move in together, get married, and in the seventh season (1988–89), conceive a son, Frederick, who is born in the following season (1989–90). Their marriage is strained when Lilith has an affair with Dr. Louis Pascal (Peter Vogt). On the Cheers spin-off Frasier, Frasier divorces her, gives her custody of Frederick, and moves from Boston to Seattle. Lilith appears in the spin-off recurringly.

=== Woody Boyd ===
Woodrow Tiberius Boyd (Woody Harrelson) — a co-bartender, commonly called "Woody". When he arrived from his Midwest hometown to Boston, Woody wanted to meet his pen pal Coach. However, he finds out that Coach already died, and is hired to work at the bar. Later, he dates Kelly Gaines (Jackie Swanson), marries her and is elected to the Boston City Council. At the end, he and Kelly have a son and daughter as revealed in Frasier.

=== Rebecca Howe ===
Rebecca Howe (Kirstie Alley) — a "voluptuously beautiful" manager and occasional waitress. Initially, she starts out a strong independent woman, but after several romantic failures with (mainly) rich men, she becomes "more neurotic, insecure, and sexually frustrated". At the start, Sam attempts to seduce Rebecca without success, but when her persona changes, he loses interest in her. In the series finale, she marries the plumber Don Santry (Tom Berenger). On Frasier, according to Sam, she divorces Don and then ends up visiting the bar without working there again.

== Recurring characters ==
Each of the following characters of Cheers may or may not be particularly significant to the story of the series; each was introduced in one season and would appear in subsequent seasons — unless introduced in season 11, which was the last season. However, even when a character appeared earlier, information is arranged based on a character's first appearance rather than an actor's, especially when a same actor portrays different characters. Moreover, uncredited appearances are disregarded.

=== Introduced in season 1 ===
==== Sumner Sloan ====
Sumner Sloan (Michael McGuire) is a college English literature professor for whom Diane Chambers (Shelley Long) worked as a teaching assistant. Divorced, Sumner became engaged to Diane, whom he left to return to his ex-wife, Barbara, flying to Barbados on the flight Diane had booked for them both. Sumner secretly tries to win Diane back while she is seriously dating Sam Malone (Ted Danson), an attempt that ultimately fails. Diane ultimately states that it wasn't because Sam read War and Peace, but because he read it for her.

In "I Do, Adieu" (1987), where he last appears, Sumner returns after he hears the news about Sam and Diane's engagement. Sumner tells Diane that he sent one of her unfinished manuscripts to one of his colleagues, who had praised it. He warns her that writing both a novel and being a housewife to Sam simultaneously is impossible. Moreover, he warns her that choosing one would put an end to the other, either her marriage or her writing talents. Diane orders Sumner to leave the bar right away, but after talking with Sam, she decides to invest six months of her time into the endeavor of finishing the book, and they ultimately do not marry.

==== Harry the Hat ====
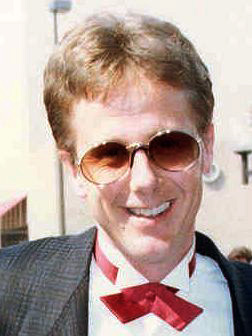
Harry Anderson, before and after television sitcom Night Court (1984–92), portrayed Harry the Hat in early 1980s and 1993.

Harry "the Hat" Gittes (Harry Anderson) is a con artist who first appears in "Sam at Eleven" (1982). More often, Harry has been kicked out by Sam for his confidence tricks, while Harry tricks bar customers into giving him money. Sam has standing orders to have Harry thrown out of the bar on sight, but Harry will help out the gang at Cheers upon occasion—partly out of sentiment and partly to protect the Cheers gang from operators even more unscrupulous than himself. As Harry notes, "I don't like the idea of someone else plucking my pigeons." In "Pick a Con... Any Con" (1983), Sam Malone (Ted Danson) bails Harry out of jail because Sam and Coach (Nicholas Colasanto) want him to spite a hustler, George Wheeler (Reid Shelton), who has been taking away $8,000 worth of bar assets from Coach at card games of gin rummy. Then Harry suggests poker, which he assumes that George may not be good at conning, and prices Sam's requests for $5,000. Later, Harry ends up "losing" to George at poker games.

However, as discovered, Harry's hand was four of a kind (four 3s), which would have beaten George's straight hand. As they later admit, Harry and George had been cheating players, including Sam, at poker to take away their money. Therefore, they play a serious but final game. When Coach scratches his nose, George indicates a gesture that his three Queens (three of a kind) would beat Harry's hand. This time, however, Harry's four 3s in his hand beats George's hand, so Harry takes all the money and then leaves the bar. Nevertheless, as it turns out, the whole events are part of Harry and Coach's plan to spite George, so Harry comes back after George leaves and then gives everyone back $8,000. Harry appeared four times in the series’ first and second seasons, after which he disappeared until season six's "A Kiss is Still a Kiss". This was actually due to the fact that the actor-magician had achieved fame in his own right by starring in his own series Night Court, which followed Cheers on NBC's Thursday night "Must See TV" line up. Harry casually explained his long absence—when asked how long it had been since his last visit to Cheers, he replied it had been "two to ten, with time off for good behavior".

In "Bar Wars VII: The Naked Prey" (1993), Harry "refuses" to help out the Cheers gang spite Gary (Robert Desiderio; previously Joel Polis), who has been taunting the Cheers gang by pranking them and seemingly always winning their competitions. He tells the gang that they are naturally "losers" and that topping Gary is impossible. However, he ultimately cons Gary by pretending to be a contractor with a fake name. Gary has his own pub, Gary's Olde Towne Tavern, demolished under Harry's "contract" for millions, but then Gary realizes that he was conned and that the money does not exist. Harry hides while Gary angrily exits the bar to chase after him. At the end, Harry steals the money from Cheers's cash register as a form of payment for taking down Gary.

==== Dave Richards ====
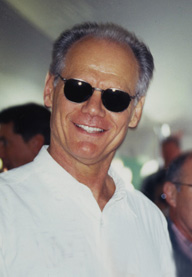
Fred Dryer's auditioning for Sam Malone inspired the creation of Dave Richards.

Dave Richards (Fred Dryer) is a sports commentator, a friend of former baseball player Sam Malone (Ted Danson), and also divorced. In "Sam at Eleven" (1982), Dave wants to interview Sam only because, unbeknownst to Sam, none of the high-profile celebrities at Dave's priorities are available. However, when one of the high-profile sports celebrities (John McEnroe) is finally available, Dave halts his interview with Sam, which puts an end to Sam's second chance at fame.

In "Old Flames" (1983), Dave realizes that Sam and Diane are together and bets that their relationship will end in 24 hours, so he and Sam can have debauchery with women. Then Dave sets Sam up with another woman to put his relationship with Diane Chambers (Shelley Long) at stake. However, Sam refuses to have a fling with that woman because he still thinks about Diane. After the time expires, Dave fails to break them up because Sam and Diane are still together. In "Love Thy Neighbor" (1985), Dave is heard on the radio, where he interviews Sam about Diane. In "'I' on Sports" (1987), Dave offers Sam a job as Dave's substitute for covering sports on television, which Sam accepts. (Nevertheless, Sam's news career is short-lived.)

Fred Dryer originally auditioned for the role of Sam Malone, who was initially a football player. Because he was a football player, Dryer was considered for that role. However, the role was eventually given to Ted Danson.

==== Paul ====
Paul (Paul Vaughn) was a bar customer who appears recurringly until "Manager Coach" (1983), an episode of the second season (1983–1984). He spends most of his time antagonising Cliff Clavin (John Ratzenberger). He is not to be confused with Paul Krapence (Paul Willson).

==== Alan ====
Alan (Alan Koss) was a bar patron who appears recurringly through the show's entire run. The character of Alan is known to be single, and lives in a room with a Murphy bed. In his first appearance "Let Me Count the Ways" (1983), Alan informs waitress Diane Chambers (Shelley Long) that she has given him a wrong drink. Immediately, she breaks into tears, so Alan tries to cheer her up without avail by "accepting" and then drinking the wrong order. In "The Heart Is the Lonely Snipe Hunter" (1985), he is one of the boys who purposely abandon Frasier Crane (Kelsey Grammer) at the fabricated snipe hunting game. In "Those Lips, Those Ice" (1988), when Carla Tortelli (Rhea Perlman) assumes that her then-husband Eddie (Jay Thomas) is cheating on her with another woman, Alan advises Carla to tell Eddie how she feels inside by expressing not only her heart but also her soul, so they both "give unto" each other. Norm Peterson (George Wendt) reacts by calling him a "clown".

==== Andy Schroeder ====
Andy Schroeder (Derek McGrath) is an ex-convict. Andy first appears in "Diane's Perfect Date" (1983) as Diane Chambers's (Shelley Long) blind date, paid by Sam Malone (Ted Danson), who calls him "Andy-Andy" because he does not know and has not asked his surname, for $20. It is discovered he killed the waitress in an Italian restaurant, Via Milano, and was imprisoned. He rides a motorcycle. During the date, Diane and Sam are horrified by Andy's murderous comments.

Andy later reappears in "Homicidal Ham" (1983) and then holds people hostage to commit robbery with a gun. Fortunately, Carla Tortelli (Rhea Perlman) catches him after he drops the gun. As learned, Andy has no job because of his past; nevertheless, Andy learned acting in high school. Diane convinces Sam not to send him to the police and instead, gives him a chance to do a performance in the Shakespearean play Othello. Andy then falls in love with Diane, but he becomes jealous and then murderous after he sees Sam and Diane kissing. At the play, performed in the bar, Andy begins choking Diane to death (as Othello does to Desdemona in the actual play) until Sam rescues her, and Norm Peterson (George Wendt) and Cliff Clavin (John Ratzenberger) grab hold of Andy.

Later, he is sometimes called "Andy-Andy" by characters and real-life sources alike.

In "Diane's Nightmare" (1985), Andy apparently marries Cynthia (Nancy Cartwright), despite his tendencies to kill Diane again. However, the whole episode turns out to be Diane's dream. In "Do Not Forsake Me, O' My Postman" (1992), Andy returns to the bar with bomb detonator around his body and wants to see Diane. Woody Boyd (Woody Harrelson) tells him that Diane no longer works there, so Andy leaves.

==== Boggs ====
Boggs (Duncan Ross) is a chauffeur to Helen Chambers (Glynis Johns), mother of Diane (Shelley Long). In "Someone Single, Someone Blue" (1983), Boggs repeatedly asks Diane to be his wife to help her mother Helen keep her inheritance under the late Spencer Chambers's will. When the time expires and Diane is still single, Helen loses all the wealth. Fortunately, as he ultimately admits, Boggs embezzled a healthy proportion of the Chambers's money in the past and has money still remaining. He proposes to be Helen's husband, and Helen accepts. In "Rebound, Part One" (1984), after Diane's huge breakup from Sam Malone (Ted Danson), Boggs takes Diane back from the psychiatric hospital to her apartment. He notifies her that Helen felt uncomfortable contacting Diane while Diane was in the ward.

==== Justice Harrison Fiedler ====
Justice Harrison Fiedler (Dean Dittman) is a justice of the peace. In his first episode, "Someone Single, Someone Blue" (1983), he performs Sam and Diane's (almost) wedding, which is halted by Diane's mother Helen, who is appalled by their bickering with each other. In his second and last episode, "Bar Bet" (1985), he performs a faux wedding for Sam and Jacqueline Bisset (not to be confused with the actress Jacqueline Bisset), whom Sam had obtained to avoid losing his bar to his friend Eddie Gordon (Michael Richards).

=== Introduced in season 2 ===
==== Tom ====
Tom Babson (Tom Babson), an aspiring lawyer who studies law and attempts to pass the bar exam. He is primarily involved in main stories that involve legality, like financial will and parental custody. The character credit in early episodes is variously Barney, Tom, or Tom Sherry, but he is never called anything but Tom (and refers to himself as "Thomas W. Babson, Esq"). In "Chambers vs. Malone" (1987), he has finally passed the bar (after numerous attempts) and is a defense attorney for Sam Malone's (Ted Danson) court case of "assaulting" Diane Chambers (Shelley Long). Although Sam testifies that there was no assault, Tom requests that Sam propose to Diane in front of the court, which Sam reluctantly does. His last episode is "Airport V" (1988).

==== Nick and Loretta Tortelli ====
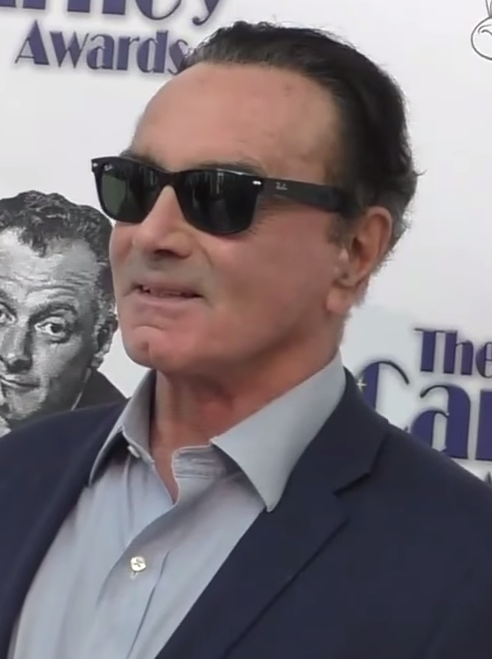
Dan Hedaya

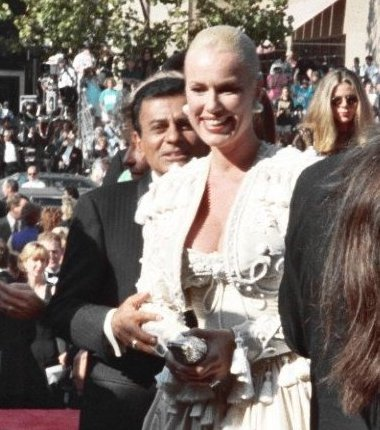
Jean Kasem (front, right)

Hedaya and Kasem portrayed, respectively, Nick and Loretta Tortelli.

Nick and Loretta Tortelli (Dan Hedaya and Jean Kasem) are a married couple currently living in Las Vegas. In previous season, Nick was referenced, mostly by his ex-wife Carla (Rhea Perlman); as discovered, he was a deadbeat father and disloyal husband when he cheated on Carla with another woman. He has made no attempt to support his children financially and barely has any contact with them. Nick is loud, unkempt, and extremely unsophisticated; despite these tremendous flaws, he has at times exercised an inexplicable romantic power over Carla. In their first episode "Battle of the Exes" (1983), after Nick and Loretta's wedding, Nick comes into the bar and then begs Carla to reunite with him, even though he is married to Loretta. However, Carla turns him down in "favor" of Sam Malone (Ted Danson) (although, unbeknownst to him, Sam and Carla pretend to be together at the wedding to make Nick jealous), and then Nick and Loretta leave.

In "An American Family" (1984), Loretta discovered that she will never be able to produce children. Therefore, Nick and Loretta attempt to retrieve custody of one of Carla's children - eldest son Anthony (Timothy Williams) - to no avail. Before marrying Nick, Loretta had dreamed of becoming a singer; she once described herself as a "taller, blonder, less Mormon Marie Osmond". Although she lacked talent, she performed with two groups: "The Grinning Americans" (described as an Up with People-type group), and The Lemon Sisters (deliberately named to be confused with The Lennon Sisters). In "If Ever I Would Leave You" (1985), Loretta kicks Nick out for not supporting her decision to join a singing group, so he goes to Cheers to work as a janitor to prove himself as a better man to Carla. Three weeks later, Loretta comes to the bar and then begs him to be still her husband. At first he refuses, but he realizes his mistake, prompting him to dump Carla again.

In "Save the Last Dance for Me" (1986), Nick and Loretta enter the dance competition against Sam and Carla, but both are disqualified during the contest. Nick and Carla dance for one time, and subsequently win the competition. At the bar, Nick begs Carla to be together with him again behind Loretta's back, but Carla, in retaliation, cracks an egg on his forehead.

Nick and Loretta appear in their own short-lived spin-off The Tortellis, which lasted from January to May 1987. In "Spellbound" (1987), Loretta leaves Nick because she figures that Nick is not faithful to her. She then goes to Cheers to seek help from Carla and Diane Chambers (Shelley Long) for independence, such as becoming a singer. Nick arrives at the bar to woo Diane, Loretta, and then Carla with a violinist and dinner without success. Diane advises Nick to improve his marriage with Loretta, so he leaves the bar trying to go after Loretta.

In "Loathe and Marriage" (1993), Nick and Loretta come to his daughter Serafina's (Leah Remini) wedding with a retired police officer, located at the bar. Carla tries to throw him out, but Sarafina convinces her to let Nick stay. At the wedding reception, Loretta sings.

==== Lewis ====
Lewis (Sam Scarber), an African-American "large, athletic male" postal worker. In the episode "Cliff's Rocky Moment" (1984), Cliff Clavin (John Ratzenberger) attempts to have Lewis brawl with Victor (Peter Iacangelo) without avail. In fact, both Lewis and Victor cannot stand Cliff because of his know-it-all behavior, and Lewis leaves, resolving not to help Cliff. In his second and final episode "I Call Your Name" (1984), Lewis is fired from his job for stealing fragrance samples from people's mail (unbeknownst to him, Cliff had reported him). Lewis wants to find out the identity of the person who reported him to physically attack him, but ultimately he decides not to do so, having already found another job.

In the book The Sitcom Reader, Robert S. Brown called him a stereotype of African Americans.

==== Steve ====
Steve (Steve Giannelli), a bar patron. His first episode is "Norman's Conquest" (1984); his final is "One for the Road" (1993), the series finale. Steve has a very cocky personality and is often seen goading his fellow barflies. In "Loverboyd" (1990), Steve receives a punishment of getting tied to a clothes rack after picking the Yankees to win the division over the Red Sox. Gianelli previously appeared as unnamed customer in "No Help Wanted" (1984).

==== Al ====
Al (Al Rosen) was an elderly male bar patron. Over the series until the actor's death in 1990, Al was sometimes involved in bar dialogue, especially cold openings. He has a distinct, gravelly voice and often unexpectedly interjected with a comedic one-liner relevant to what the characters are discussing, often leaving them speechless momentarily. In his first credited episode "Fortune and Men's Weight" (1984), when Carla Tortelli (Rhea Perlman) asks men who the all-time "bigwig" is, Al declares "Sinatra" as an answer, bemusing patrons. In "Cheers: The Motion Picture" (1987), Al sends Woody Boyd's (Woody Harrelson) father a philosophical phrase that convinces him to let Woody stay in Boston rather than make him move back to his hometown. In "Bar Wars" (1988), he attends Gary's Olde Towne Tavern, the bar that is Cheers' rival. His last credited episode is "The Improbable Dream: Part 2" (season 8, episode 2; 1989). In the Frasier episode "Cheerful Goodbyes" (2002), Cliff mistakenly refers to Phil as Al; Phil corrects him by saying that Al died "fourteen years" earlier, i.e. 1988, contradicting Al Rosen's death in 1990 and last credited appearance.

=== Introduced in season 3 ===
==== Larry ====
Larry (Larry Harpel) is a bar patron. Larry's first episode is "Diane Meets Mom" (1984); his last is "One Last Fling" (1987). He is a balding, nondescript man who sits to Norm's left but sometimes gets on Norm's nerves. Actor Harpel previously appeared in the season premiere "Rebound" (1984) as an unnamed customer.

==== Tim ====
Tim (Tim Cunningham) is a bar patron. He is one of the boys in "The Heart Is the Lonely Snipe Hunter" (1985) who abandon Frasier Crane (Kelsey Grammer), who has been playing a snipe hunting game in the woods. Actor Tim Cunningham previously appeared as Chuck in the first season and Greg in the second. Chuck works at a lab that creates mutated viruses. Whenever he visits the bar, bar staff sanitize everything after he leaves, especially surfaces Chuck touched or may have touched, to eliminate potential viruses,

==== Walt Twitchell ====
Walter Q. "Walt" Twitchell (Raye Birk) is a postal carrier and rival of Cliff Clavin. In his first episode "Executive's Executioner Hines" (1985), Walt attempts to mail Cliff Clavin's (John Ratzenberger) letter that contains insults to Cliff's noisy neighbors, but Cliff retrieves it and rips it to shreds. In "A Diminished Rebecca with a Suspended Cliff" (1992), he and his brother-in-law, posing as a postal inspector named Henderson, trick Cliff into believing that all postal employees must wear a new uniform. Years later, he appears in the Frasier episode "Cheerful Goodbyes" (Season 9), at Cliff's retirement party, where he and Cliff make up.

=== Introduced in season 4 ===
==== Beth Curtis ====
Beth Curtis (Amanda Wyss) is an old-time girlfriend of Woody Boyd's (Woody Harrelson) from Indiana. In "Woody Goes Belly Up" (1985), Beth and Woody are reunited. During high school, both Woody and Beth were overweight, a problem which seemed to become resolved once they were separated; however, after their reunion, they end up overeating and people unsuccessfully attempt to help them overcome it. Fortunately, Frasier Crane (Kelsey Grammer) tells Beth that she and Woody substitute overeating for premarital sex due to religious backgrounds. Although Sam Malone (Ted Danson) and Diane Chambers (Shelley Long) take the couple to dinner to help them control their eating habits, Woody and Beth end up taking Frasier's psychological advice seriously and make plans to have sex.

In her second and last episode "The Book of Samuel" (1986), Beth ends up engaged to her fiancé Leonard Twilley (John Brace), much to Woody's disappointment. Beth confesses that she and Woody are two different people who are not meant for each other: Woody is adventurous, while she wants to settle down into commitment.

==== Anthony and Annie Tortelli ====
Anthony Tortelli (Timothy Williams) is the eldest son of Nick (Dan Hedaya) and Carla Tortelli (Rhea Perlman), and Annie (Mandy Ingber) is his wife. In "The Groom Wore Clearasil" (1985), teenagers Anthony and Annie want to be married with his mother Carla's permission, but Carla refuses and tries to keep them apart without avail because she assumes that Anthony resembles his deadbeat father Nick. Suddenly, Annie's cousin Gabrielle (Sherilyn Fenn) walks into the bar, and Anthony becomes attracted to her, much to Annie's dismay. Anthony and Annie also appear as regular characters in the short-lived spin-off The Tortellis (1987) and live with Nick and his wife Loretta (Jean Kasem).

After the spin-off ended, in two-part episode "Little Carla, Happy at Last" (1987), married Anthony and Annie were kicked out by Nick and then decide to live with Carla. At the bar, they meet pregnant Carla's new husband Eddie LeBec (Jay Thomas) and then openly disdain him for getting Carla pregnant. In "Tale of Two Cuties" (1988), Annie finds her husband Anthony lazy because he has no job. Therefore, she works as a temporary waitress and then tries to flirt with the bartender Sam Malone (Ted Danson), to no avail. To try and win her back, Anthony finds a job at a burger joint. At the end, he walks in the bar with his work uniform to prove himself to Annie, winning her back in the process.

In "Slumber Party Massacred" (1988), Anthony impregnated Annie and then announces it to Carla at dinner. Outraged and horrified that Annie is pregnant at such a young age (and at the prospect of becoming a grandmother), Carla kicks them out and neither are seen ever again, destroying the couple's plans to live with Carla and Eddie after their baby arrived. Neither Anthony nor Annie appeared in season eleven for Anthony's sister Serafina's (Leah Remini) wedding, but in Season 10's "Unplanned Parenthood", Gino (Josh Lozoff) mentions that Anthony is in prison.

==== Gary ====
Gary (rotatingly Joel Polis and Robert Desiderio) is a bartender and owner of his own pub Gary's Olde Town Tavern. After the rivalry between Gary's and Cheers was established in season four, beginning in season six one episode per year — generally called "Bar Wars" – featured a contest between the two drinking holes for customers. The Cheers gang almost invariably loses each contest to Gary. Nevertheless, in his first episode "From Beer to Eternity" (1985), Diane Chambers's (Shelley Long) strike in bowling helps the Cheers team win the game. In his final episode "Bar Wars VII: The Naked Prey" (1993), Gary has his bar demolished by Harry the Hat (Harry Anderson), who uses a fake name, for millions of dollars. However, Gary realizes that Harry is a fake when Harry's check bounces, leaving Gary without money and the bar.

==== Paul Krapence ====
Paul Krapence (Paul Willson) is a bar patron. His first episode is "Fools and Their Money" (1985), and his last is the series finale "One for the Road". He generally hangs around with Norm and Cliff in the hopes of being included in their activities. Most often he is excluded from the Cheers gang's activities, something that upsets him deeply, except for some, which "he insisted" on participating in. In "It's Lonely on the Top" (1993), Paul had sex with a drunk Carla Tortelli (Rhea Perlman) offscreen, which she regrets, while he takes pride in it. However, Sam Malone (Ted Danson) orders him not to tell anyone about this for everyone's sake. In the season 10 episode "The Norm Who Came to Dinner", Norm explains that Paul (years earlier) had been an athlete who had been brought into the bar to try to get him and Cliff into shape, implying that Paul instead conformed to become the frumpy, smoking bar patron we see throughout the show's run. It is later revealed that Paul works as a toll booth operator. Actor Paul Willson appeared previously in Cheers as Glen (although credited as "Gregg") in "Someone Single, Single Blue" (1983) and as Tom in "Little Sister, Don't Cha" (1983).

As discovered in "The Show Where Sam Shows Up", an episode of the spin-off Frasier, Paul sleeps with Sam's fiancée Sheila (Téa Leoni). However, Sam becomes angrier when he finds out about her and Cliff Clavin (John Ratzenberger), which ends Sam's relationship with her. The only Frasier episode Paul appears in is "Cheerful Goodbyes" (2002), where he attends Cliff's retirement party only because he lives in the hotel where it is held.

==== 139th Street Quartet ====
139th Street Quartet is a barbershop quartet consisting of tenor Doug Anderson, bass Jim Kline, baritone Peter Neushel, and a fourth member. The fourth member is lead Larry Wright in "Dark Imaginings" in 1986. By the time of the next episode, John Sherburn sang lead ("The Stork Brings a Crane" (1989)). In the cold open of "Dark Imaginings", the bass quits after one of the quartet members chides him for costing them their chance to win a championship. Norm tries out the quartet to fulfill his lifelong dream only to then abandon it immediately. In "The Stork Brings a Crane", the quartet performs all day at Cheers's centennial anniversary party, much to bar patrons' annoyance, until Sam chokes one of them off-screen.

==== Phil ====
Phil (Philip Perlman) is a regular bar patron who appears throughout the series beginning in the fourth season. He is an older gentleman with large glasses who would make an occasional acerbic comment. Phil often sat in the rear of the bar next to Al before Al's death. Perlman was the father of Cheers cast member Rhea Perlman.

==== Corinne ====
Corinne (Doris Grau), an elderly waitress, is hired by Woody Boyd (Woody Harrelson) in her first episode "Diane Chambers Day" (1986). As discovered, she also works as a waitress at Norm Peterson's (George Wendt) favorite restaurant, The Hungry Heifer. Her last episode is "Cheers: The Motion Picture" (1987). Corinne told Norm that all the waitresses at The Hungry Heifer had a nickname for him: "The Guy Who Comes Back". While covering for Diane, Corinne manages to catch the eye of barfly Al (Al Rosen). Portrayer Doris Grau was also a script supervisor of Cheers.

=== Introduced in season 5 ===
==== Esther Clavin ====
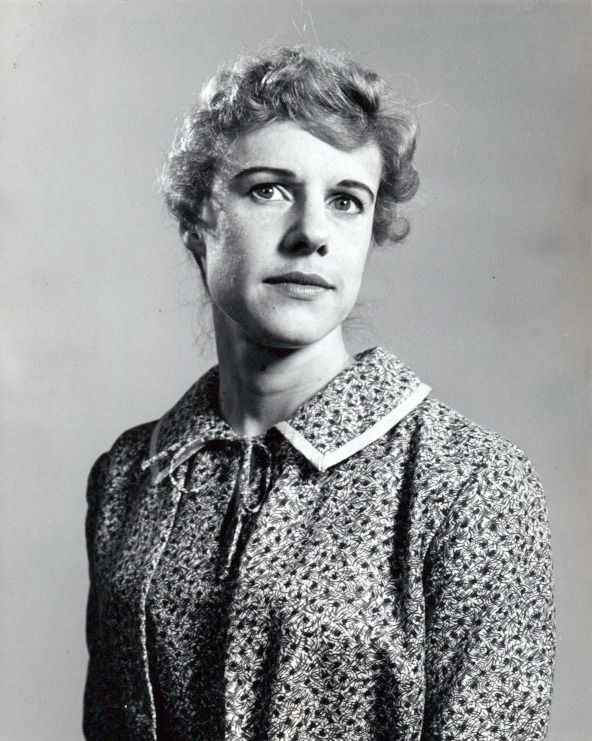
Frances Sternhagen

Esther "Ma" Clavin (Frances Sternhagen) is the mother of Cliff Clavin (John Ratzenberger).

Before her physical appearances, a lot is learnt about her, mainly through her son. As learned in "Sam Turns the Other Cheek" (1984), her husband Cliff Sr. (Dick O'Neill) left her and their son behind. In the episode "Just Three Friends", when Cliff and Norm Peterson (George Wendt) make a prank call to her. It is first mentioned in the third season that Cliff lives with her, for which the other barflies mocked him. In the episode "Coach in Love Part 2", Cliff's mother is heard in a voice-over. When she asked if she could stop by and meet the gang, Cliff whispered under his breath "When Hell freezes over".

Regardless, Esther ultimately appears in "Money Dearest" (1986), and becomes engaged to a wealthy man Duncan Fitzgerald (Richard Erdman) upon Cliff's urging. Cliff tries to persuade Esther to break off the engagement when Esther makes Duncan donate half his fortune to charity, but Duncan dies hours later, leaving her heartbroken. In season six, it was revealed that Cliff, contrary to his usual know-it-all personality at the bar, is actually quiet at home and his mother is actually "the real yapper in the family". Esther's appearances at the bar lend insight into Cliff's know-it-all personality, as Esther spouts even more useless facts than Cliff; psychiatrist Frasier Crane (Kelsey Grammer) remarks that after meeting Esther, he sees Cliff as "almost heroically" well-adjusted.

One of Esther's pastimes is making pretzels in unintentionally unusual shapes. When Cliff brings them into the bar in "Second Time Around" (1986), patrons find them awful tasting but are unable to tell him without hurting Esther's feelings, prompting Cliff to bring them in again on a handful of other occasions. In "The Last Angry Mailman" (1987), Esther sells their house, only to have it bulldozed and then replaced by a convenience store. Since then, Cliff and Esther live in an apartment together, which is first revealed in "My Fair Clavin" (1987). In "Look Before You Sleep" (1993) and as witnessed by Sam Malone (Ted Danson), Cliff and Esther argue over their lives together and how dateless Cliff is, but then apologize to one another, which stuns Sam.

In her "Rebecca Gaines, Rebecca Loses" (1993), Cliff sends Esther to a senior center. He subsequently begins regretting it, until discovering Esther is actually enjoying living there. However, when Cliff receives the first bill for her care, he quickly brings his mother back to the apartment.

==== Vera Peterson ====
Vera Peterson (née Kreitzer) (Bernadette Birkett) is the wife of Norm Peterson (George Wendt)

Most of Vera's appearances are uncredited voice-overs, although her body is seen in the fifth-season episode "Thanksgiving Orphans"; her face is covered by filling from a pie Diane Chambers (Shelley Long) throws at Sam. In the ninth season episode "It's A Wonderful Wife" her legs can be seen through the bar's front window as she sits crying on the steps after being fired from her job at Melville's as a hat-check girl. Birkett's only credited appearance is in Season 11's "Look Before You Sleep".

Vera's background is briefly mentioned throughout the series: she and Norm were high school sweethearts, Vera was a cheerleader, and they married soon after graduating. In "Truce or Consequences" (1982), the two celebrate their tenth wedding anniversary (which they celebrate by going for pizza, so Norm can "get back here [the bar] by ten"), which means they married at some point in 1972.

Vera's family, who also remain unseen, frequently descend upon the Peterson household. Vera's (much) younger sister, Donna, is the most frequent visitor, and usually stays for extended periods of time. Norm claims to dread these visits because, while he considers her more attractive than Vera, she relentlessly hits on him; he claims to have once walked in on Donna while she was naked and she tried to cover herself up with an emery board. In "One Hugs, The Other Doesn't" (1992), Norm mentions that Vera has nieces and nephews, which means Vera must have at least one brother or another sister. While generally tolerating Donna and Vera's other relatives, Norm shows a dislike to her parents: when Vera's mother stayed with them, Norm was assigned to take her to visit Bunker Hill, but he instead locked her in the car and went to the bar as usual. A conversation at the bar revealed that Norm doesn't know if Vera's father is alive or not; when he calls her and asks, she refuses to speak to him for several days, and the issue is never clarified.

Despite being the frequent butt of Norm's jokes, he professes a deep love for Vera. When they separate following Norm's inability to hold down a job, Norm slumps without her. When he learns that Vera is being wooed by former high school wrestling rival Wally Bodell (Walter Olkewicz) in "They Called Me Mayday" (1983), Norm challenged Wally to a wrestling match in order to win her back; when Vera learns of this, it leads to her reconciling with Norm. In "Love Thy Neighbour" (1985), Phyllis Henshaw (Miriam Flynn) visits the bar, voicing her suspicions that her husband Ron is having an affair with Vera. Norm is subsequently distraught at the thought of Vera cheating on him and the prospect of him leaving her; despite that, he refuses to have an affair with Phyllis out of spite, still feeling a certain loyalty to Vera. In "Feeble Attraction" (1990), Norm's secretary Doris (Cynthia Stevenson) reveals that she has developed feelings for Norm, which flusters him, although he is soon rid of the problem when he has to close the business down. In "Norm's Big Audit" (1993), when IRS agent Dot Carroll (Sharon Barr) offers to overlook Norm's tax evasion in exchange for sexual favors, Norm refuses to betray Vera (a decision that may have been influenced by his fear and disgust for Dot).

In "The Two Faces of Norm" (1989), Norm scares his employee Rudi (Eric Allen Kramer) by using an alternate personality, harsh-hearted Anton Kreitzer, to scare them into shape. When asked by Frasier where he came up with the name Kreitzer, Norm reveals that it was Vera's maiden name.

==== Hugh ====
Hugh (Hugh Maguire) is a tall, balding (with a fringe of dark hair) bar patron wearing usually a beige or brown sport jacket and tie. His first episode is "Chambers vs. Malone" (1987), and his last is "Jumping Jerks" (1988). In the cold opening of "Chambers vs. Malone", Hugh sits with Pete and Mark at one table, forgetting who is the "designated driver" while intoxicated. Sam calls a taxicab company to take them home.

==== Pete ====
Pete (Peter Schreiner) is a friendly blonde man seen usually in casual clothing. His first episode is "Chambers vs. Malone" (1987), and his last is "One for the Road" (1993). In the cold opening of "Chambers vs. Malone", Pete sits with Hugh and Mark at one table, forgetting who is the "designated driver" while intoxicated. Sam calls a taxicab company to take them home. He loans Sam surveillance equipment in "Indoor Fun with Sammy and Robby" (1990), telling Frasier that he uses it to spy on his wife, who "sleeps around a lot".

==== Mark ====
Mark (Mark Arnott) is a man with black hair who is usually seen wearing a suit. His first episode is "Chambers vs. Malone" (1987), and his last is "Indoor Fun with Sammy and Robby" (1990). In the cold opening of "Chambers vs. Malone", Mark sits with Hugh and Pete; when ready to leave the three forget who the "designated driver" was intended to be, leading to Sam calling them a taxicab ride home.

==== Eddie LeBec ====
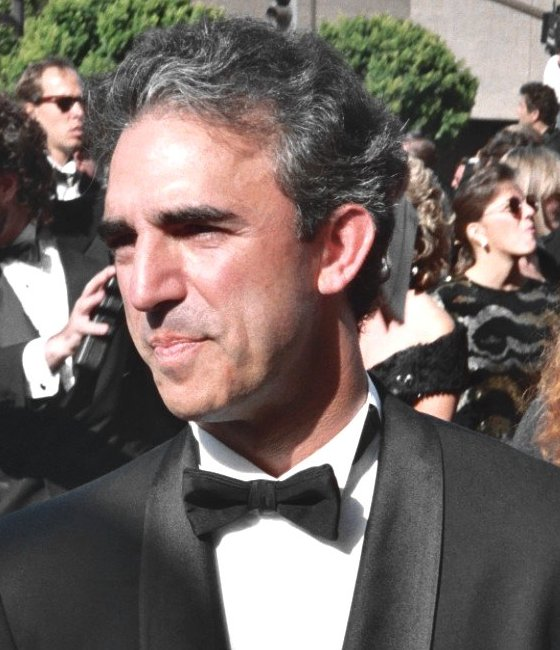
Jay Thomas portrays Carla's second husband, Eddie LeBec

In two-part episode "Never Love a Goalie" (1987), Carla Tortelli (Rhea Perlman) meets the Boston Bruins ice hockey player, Guy "Eddie" LeBec (Jay Thomas), who has a long winning streak and a French Canadian background, and then begins to date him. However, because of their relationship, Eddie's streak unfortunately comes to an end. Since both are superstitious, they end their relationship in order to avoid ruining Eddie's ability to play. They nevertheless reconcile shortly thereafter and promise to break up repeatedly before every game to avoid the "curse". In "Home Is the Sailor", Carla is revealed to be several months pregnant with Eddie's twins (incorporated by another of Perlman's pregnancies). In the two-part episode "Little Carla, Happy at Last", Carla and Eddie wed. She almost quits her waitressing job because Eddie said that he would take care of her financially. However, the Bruins released him from his contract due to his age and declining athletic performance, and he could not find another team. In "Airport V" (1988), Eddie ends up as a penguin mascot for a traveling ice show in another state. Later in the 1987–88 season, Carla gives birth to their twin boys, named Elvis and Jesse, after Carla's idol Elvis Presley and his stillborn twin brother.

In "Death Takes a Holiday on Ice" (1989), Eddie is killed by an ice resurfacer when he saves the life of another member of the ice show. At the funeral, it was revealed that he had bigamously married another woman, Gloria (Anne De Salvo), and had twins with her as well. Carla changes her surname back to Tortelli to avoid being confused with the other "Mrs. LeBec".

The demise of Jay Thomas's character Eddie LeBec has been claimed to stem from Thomas's comments "about" Perlman in a radio show. However, Thomas denied this and declared that he was referring only to the Carla character. Despite Ken Levine's praise of Thomas's acting and the pairing of Eddie and Carla, Eddie was reportedly written out of the show because Perlman thought that the pairing would make her "not part of the people in the bar."

=== Introduced in season 6 ===
==== Joanne ====
Joanne (Catherine MacNeal) is a local newscaster, appearing only when someone, usually Norm Peterson (George Wendt), is watching the bar's television. In "'I' on Sports" (1987), her short-time coanchor Sam Malone (Ted Danson) flirts with her, but she resists and turns him down. In "Christmas Cheers" (1987), she reports a raging lunatic (presumably Cliff Clavin (John Ratzenberger)) throwing canned foods at an airplane. In her last episode "Where Nobody Knows Your Name" (1990), she reports that imprisoned millionaire Robin Colcord (Roger Rees) cheated on Rebecca Howe (Kirstie Alley) with another woman.

=== Introduced in season 7 ===
==== Father Barry ====
Father Barry (Eric Christmas) is a priest, who usually gives advice about sexuality and spirituality. His first episode is "Swear to God" (1988), and his last is "Achilles Hill" (1991). In "Death Takes a Holiday on Ice" (1990), he officiates at Eddie LeBec's (Jay Thomas) funeral, where Eddie's bigamy is revealed when Eddie's second wife appears, shocking the invited guests, including Eddie's widow Carla and Father Barry.

==== Mr. Sheridan ====
Mr. Sheridan (Michael Currie) is corporate vice president for the Lilian Corporation, of which Rebecca Howe (Kirstie Alley) is a minor executive. In "Adventures in Housesitting" (1989), he assigns her to babysit his doberman Sir Broundwin the Gallant, also called Buster, while he leaves for a business trip. During Rebecca's care, Buster runs away from Mr. Sheridan's manor, so Woody brings in another doberman Satan, a wrecking yard's dog resembling Buster, to conceal this negligence. Then Mr. Sheridan returns from the trip and pets Satan, fully unaware of the situation. Then Sam brings Buster, retrieved by a neighbor, through the backdoor to switch the dogs in the kitchen. To prevent Mr. Sheridan from entering the kitchen where the ruckus occurs, Rebecca distracts Mr. Sheridan by discussing a trophy-looking urn, which he reveals contains his late wife's ashes. Later at the Cheers bar, the bar regulars are unsure whether the dogs were successfully switched; Cliff says "Geronimo" as one of the Indian names that provokes the dog to attack him, confirming the dog to be Satan.

In "For Real Men Only" (1989), Mr. Sheridan assigns Rebecca to manage a retirement party at the bar for an employee, Larry, also his brother-in-law. The party turns out depressing mainly because Larry is very dull to entertain. After failed efforts to enliven up the party, Rebecca jadedly allows newborn Frederick Crane's bris to take place at the same time. Consequently, the retirement party livens up, and Larry plans to marry a woman, pleasing Mr. Sheridan, who wants Larry out of the house.

==== Maggie O'Keefe ====
Margaret Catherine "Maggie" O'Keefe (Annie Golden) is a recurring love interest for Cliff Clavin (John Ratzenberger) from the seventh season onward. Maggie first appears in "Please Mr. Postman" (season 7, episode 12) as a rookie postal carrier who is to be trained by Cliff. Maggie asks Cliff out, and he accepts. However, Maggie is later caught taking a postal vehicle to a motel and is fired. She then leaves Cliff to go to Canada to join the Canadian post office. She makes regular appearances thereafter, leading to her and Cliff's on-again, off-again relationship.

Maggie reappears in season eleven episode "Do Not Forsake Me, O' My Postman" (her final appearance), informing Cliff that she is pregnant with Cliff's child. This forced Cliff to admit that he and Maggie never had sex, causing the other barflies to mock him. Cliff agrees to marry Maggie. Before they depart, she decides to call her child's real father, so Cliff would not worry anymore. She then tells Norm that the father is upset someone else will be raising his child and that he wants to marry her and Cliff is off the hook. However, as she leaves she tells Cliff they did have sex, twice, though Cliff was apparently inebriated and did not remember.

==== Kelly Gaines ====
Kelly Susan Boyd (née Gaines) (Jackie Swanson) is a love interest (and later wife) for Woody Boyd (Woody Harrelson) from the seventh season. She appeared in twenty-four episodes. Like Woody, she is naïve about the world and not overly intelligent. On the other hand Kelly is, again like Woody, very sweet and polite and, despite her vast wealth, never knowingly condescends to or patronizes others.

Kelly and Woody first meet in the thirteenth episode of the seventh season. Woody and Sam Malone (Ted Danson) are bartending at a private party to celebrate Kelly's return from Europe. Kelly is a rich and sheltered girl, but Woody is able to open her eyes to new experiences, the first being a monster truck pull. Again in Kelly's third appearance in the nineteenth episode of the seventh season, Woody teaches her a lesson from his world. Instead of buying her an expensive gift for her birthday, he writes her a memorable song.

Kelly and Woody marry in the tenth season's finale episode. The ceremony and attendant celebrations, at the Gaines' mansion, are a fiasco: The minister dies; Kelly's flirtatious cousin Monika (Colleen Morris) teases Sam until her fanatically jealous husband brandishes a sword; Rebecca Howe's (Kirstie Alley) petulance causes the French chef to quit, leaving her in charge of the food; Carla Tortelli (Rhea Perlman) keeps getting pushed down the shaft in the dumbwaiter; Woody cannot keep his hands (and other things) off Kelly before the ceremony; and two attack dogs (cf. "The Lads" on Magnum, P.I.) menace everyone who dares exit the kitchen to the patio until an infuriated Carla chases them inside, at which time they whimper like puppies and scamper away. To top it off, the dead body of the minister tips over and topples the wedding cake to the floor. Despite this, the wedding goes ahead.

Kelly and Woody were expecting their first child when Cheers ended.

In the sixteenth episode of the second season of Frasier, Sam visits, and it is revealed that Kelly and Woody's first child is a baby boy. In the thirteenth episode of the sixth season, Woody visits Seattle and reveals that he and Kelly have had another child, a girl.

==== Walter Gaines ====
Walter Gaines (Richard Doyle) is Kelly's (Jackie Swanson) father and one of Rebecca Howe's (Kirstie Alley) corporate executives. Since his first episode "Golden Boyd" (1989), Walter usually disapproves of Kelly and Woody being together. Eventually, he accepts the relationship when they become married in "An Old Fashioned Wedding" (1992). In "Ill-Gotten Gaines" (1992), he has a brief affair with his married sister-in-law Katherine (Sondra Currie). Due to a misunderstanding, he mistakenly believes Woody had found out and is attempting to blackmail him. He later learns that Woody knew nothing of the affair and that Woody would never stoop to blackmail, however Mr. Gaines' butler Hives overhears the entire conversation and proceeds to blackmail him.

In "Rebecca Gaines, Rebecca Loses" (1993), Walter asks Rebecca for a date at the bar, even after she gets drunk and then humiliates him at the party in the house. However, Rebecca turns him down because she realizes she would only be dating him for his money. Walter is divorced from Roxanne (Melendy Britt), who appears in "Woody Or Won't He" (1990). Walter's mother (Celeste Holm) accepts Woody as a husband for Kelly in the episode "No Rest for Woody" (1992).

==== Ludlow Tortelli ====
Ludlow Tortelli (Jarrett Lennon) is Carla Tortelli's (Rhea Perlman) youngest son. Nicknamed "Lud" by Carla, he is named for his absentee father – the esteemed psychiatrist (and mentor of Frasier Crane (Kelsey Grammer)), Dr. Bennett Ludlow (James Karen) – and is conceived in "Whodunit?" (season 3, episode 13). He first appears in the Season 7 episode "I Kid You Not", when his coach drops him off at Cheers after his T-ball game. After Carla asks him how the game went, it becomes clear Lud is much better suited for intellectual activities than sports ("They finally put me in after the kid with the cast on his leg and the two fat girls left"). Frasier and his wife Lilith (Bebe Neuwirth) take a shine to the bright and inquisitive youngster and offer to take him to an opera, to which Lud happily agrees. Excited at the opportunity to mentor Ludlow, the Cranes continue to invite him out to one high-minded activity after another, which eventually alienates Carla. Feeling bad for taking away her time with son, the Cranes invite her and Ludlow to dinner at a fancy restaurant. However, Ludlow dislikes the food and crawls under the table in protest. Frasier attempts to lure him out with psychology, but Ludlow responds by giving Frasier the "hot foot" treatment, effectively ending their mentorship. Carla lures Lud out from the table with the promise of taking him out for hamburgers but then orders him to apologize to Frasier for the incident, which Ludlow does.

He is also mentioned (in name only) in season 6, episode 13 "Woody for Hire Meets Norman of the Apes" as Carla is describing the horrible things her kids did that day; apparently, Ludlow unplugged the freezer to see if frozen peas defrosted quicker than ice-cream.

Ludlow appears briefly in two more episodes: "Unplanned Parenthood" (1991) and "Rich Man, Wood Man" (1992), the latter in which he sells chocolate candy.

=== Introduced in season 8 ===
==== Robin Colcord ====
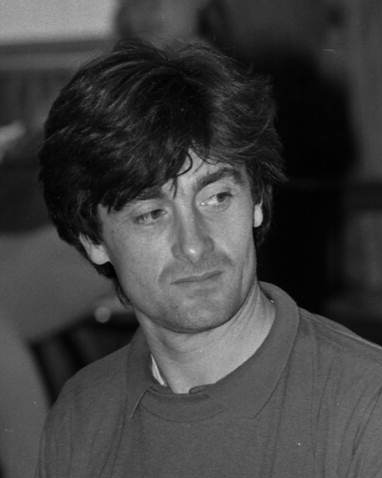
Roger Rees portrayed multi-millionaire Robin Colcord.

Robin Colcord (Roger Rees), was an English multi-millionaire industrialist, who spent most of his time on Cheers as a love interest for the gold-digging Rebecca Howe (Kirstie Alley). This leads to his developing something of a rivalry with Sam Malone (Ted Danson), because of Sam's own romantic interest in Rebecca. In November 1989 Rees told a news agency Knight-Ridder Wire about the creation of the character:

They needed a fillip, to give them a boost, someone to drive Sam [Malone] crazy. Robin's there to be dashing, sexy, irritating. He's not as charming and nice as he appears to be at first sight. He's sort of the villain of the piece. He's a megalomaniac millionaire. He's got an airline and a helicopter fleet. It's very much Donald Trump.

In January 1990, actor Rees said that he had not based "the character on anyone", despite "speculation that Colcord was a British version of Trump," wrote Phil Kloer of Cox News Service.

In season 8, Rebecca and Sam discover that Robin is plotting a hostile takeover of the company for which Rebecca worked, the Lilian Corporation, and has been secretly and illegally using Rebecca's access to the company's confidential information. Rebecca chooses to conceal Robin's activities for the sake of their relationship. However, Sam discovers that the company suspected Rebecca of being a willing corporate spy. To protect her, Sam reveals Robin's crimes.

Amidst the ensuing scandal, Robin is arrested and briefly sent to prison as well as losing his business positions and money. In season 9, he and Rebecca plan to marry on his release, despite his new humble status. She chooses not to go through with this. He then reveals that he still had some of his fortune in a secret stash, but that he would go away if she still had not changed her mind. Believing this to be a bluff, she refuses yet again, and watches as he walks out of her life carrying a moneybelt which he had concealed in her desk. In his last appearance at "It's a Mad, Mad, Mad Bar", an episode of season 11, Robin claims to be a broke but humble vagabond and petty fugitive, asking to reunite with Rebecca. The episode ends with him and Rebecca attempting to hitchhike out of town, while Rebecca believes that this is a second test.

==== Frederick Crane ====
Frederick Gaylord Crane (Christopher and Kevin Graves; Luke Tarsitano and Trevor Einhorn in Frasier, Jack Cutmore-Scott in Frasier reboot) is the son of Frasier and Lilith Sternin. "Freddy" made his first appearance as a baby on Cheers, while his parents are still married; he appears in several episodes throughout the show's run. Frederick is born during the eighth season episode "The Stork Brings a Crane". He is delivered in a taxicab while Lilith is on her way home from the hospital after an episode of false labor. Lilith tolerates the pain by biting down on one of the cab driver's fuzzy dice.

==== Captain Dobbins ====
Captain Dobbins (Robert Machray) is a fire marshal who is often the victim of pranks at Cheers. He appeared in several "Bar Wars" episodes, in which the Cheers gang thought he was an agent of Gary's Olde Town Tavern, only to be proved wrong. He also appeared in the final season, when the Cheers gang suspected Robin Colcord of hiding money belts at Cheers. They suspected Captain Dobbins of stealing the money belts, only to be proved wrong yet again. He appeared in four episodes.

=== Introduced in season 9 ===
==== Kevin McHale ====
Kevin McHale (himself) is a Boston Celtics player. In "Cheers Fouls Out" (1990), he plays for Cheers's basketball team against rival bar Gary's Olde Towne Tavern. McHale is told by Sam Malone (Ted Danson) that the game is a charity match; when he finds out that it is a lie, he tells Sam that he will play if they donate the winnings to charity. During one of the games, he is injured but quickly recovers.

In "Where Have All the Floorboards Gone?" (1991), McHale is brought by Sam as a birthday present to Norm Peterson (George Wendt). Bar patrons, mostly Cliff Clavin (John Ratzenberger), feed McHale bar trivia including asking a question about the number of bolts in the floorboards in Boston Garden. McHale becomes obsessed with this question, and it severely affects his basketball performance. The gang try to undo the damage but to no avail; they break into a basketball stadium overnight and end up ruining the floor.

==== John Allen Hill ====
John Allen Hill (Keene Curtis) is a restaurateur who becomes the owner of Melville's, the seafood restaurant above Cheers, in season 9. He informs Sam that the deed for Melville's includes Cheers' bathrooms and pool room, and after some resistance, Sam eventually capitulates and begins paying monthly rent to him, until Sam and Rebecca team up to purchase the rooms. Sam despises him due to his condescending and disdainful manner. In season nine, Sam dates Hill's daughter Valerie as a way to get back at Hill for his attitude toward the Cheers bar. Hill and Carla have a combative relationship that frequently turns sexual.

==== Henrí ====
Henrí (Anthony Cistaro) is a French photographer who becomes friends with Kelly Gaines during her time abroad in Paris. Woody finds his frequent "jokes" about stealing Kelly away from him tiresome, and he does on one occasion attempt to trick Kelly into a supposed green card marriage. He is a lothario who is familiar with Sam's playboy reputation among stewardesses. Henrí and Sam are good friends until the final season, when Henrí challenges Sam to a contest; whoever gets the most phone numbers of women by midnight would be "acknowledged as the world's greatest ladies' man". Henrí ends up winning by just one point, only to have Sam walk out with three women who do "everything" together.

==== Gino Tortelli ====
Gino Tortelli (Josh Lozoff) is Carla's son. To keep the family peace between Carla and her mother, he agrees to keep the family tradition alive and change his name to Benito Mussolini, but Carla initially refuses. In the first season, Carla tells a drunk Diane Chambers that Gino is the result of a one-night stand between Carla and Sam Malone. Diane is horrified at the thought, but this later turns out to be a malicious lie told by Carla to annoy Diane. In Season 10, he wants to become a priest, but changes his mind and decides to become a male model.

=== Introduced in season 10 ===
==== Serafina Tortelli ====
Serafina Tortelli (Leah Remini) is the eldest daughter of Nick (Dan Hedaya) and Carla Tortelli (Rhea Perlman). She first appears, albeit briefly, in the episode "Unplanned Parenthood." Sam Malone (Ted Danson) and Rebecca Howe (Kirstie Alley) decide they should babysit Carla's kids in order to hone their parental skills. Arriving at Carla's house, Rebecca blows a whistle to line up all their kids (a la the Von Trapp family in The Sound of Music). Serafina promptly informs them she is spending the night with her boyfriend and knocks the whistle into Rebecca's mouth, causing her to choke on it. She ends up staying against her will through dinner but warns Sam and Rebecca they better let her go since her boyfriend is a retired cop.

Her second, and more prominent, appearance was in "Loathe and Marriage", where she weds her retired cop boyfriend, Pat McDougall (Dennis Cockrum) after becoming pregnant. The ceremony is disrupted by the unexpected arrival of her deadbeat father Nick and his wife Loretta (Jean Kasem). Carla insists Nick leave but Serafina objects, telling Carla she knows he's a terrible father but she still wants him there - she had always pictured her dad giving her away on her wedding day. Sarafina asks Carla how it made her feel that her own father missed her wedding. Carla admits it made her feel "pretty rotten" and, seeing Sarafina's point, relents and lets Nick stay.

She is previously mentioned in "Woody for Hire Meets Norman of the Apes", as Carla is describing the horrible things her kids did that day. Apparently, Serafina took a pair of hedge clippers to the shag carpet.

== Characters appearing in only one season ==
Each of the following characters of Cheers or real-life people portraying themselves, notable or not, appears in only one season. Even if an actor portrays various characters in the series, a more significant character who appeared in only one season is listed below. However, a character is briefly listed usually without episode synopses.

=== Season 1 ===
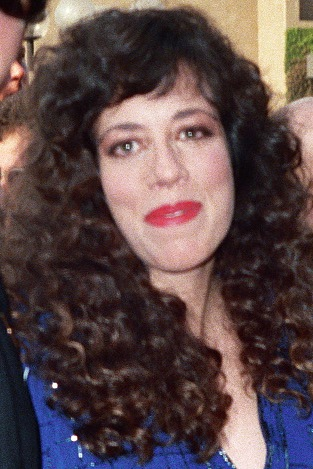
Allyce Beasley portrays Lisa Pantusso, the eponymous character in "Coach's Daughter".

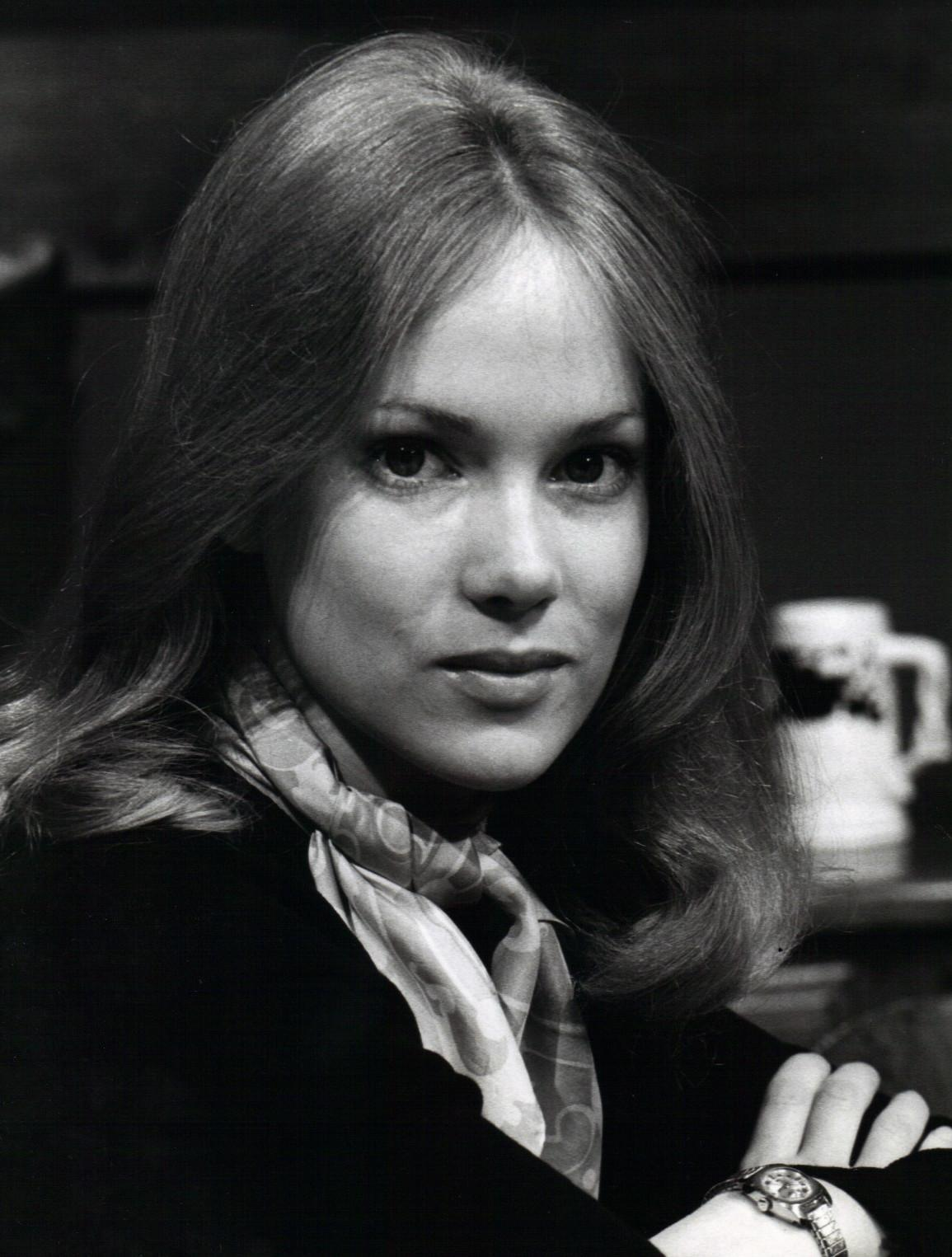
Julia Duffy portrays Diane Chambers's friend, Rebecca Prout, in "Any Friend of Diane's." Duffy auditioned as Diane Chambers, a role given to Shelley Long.

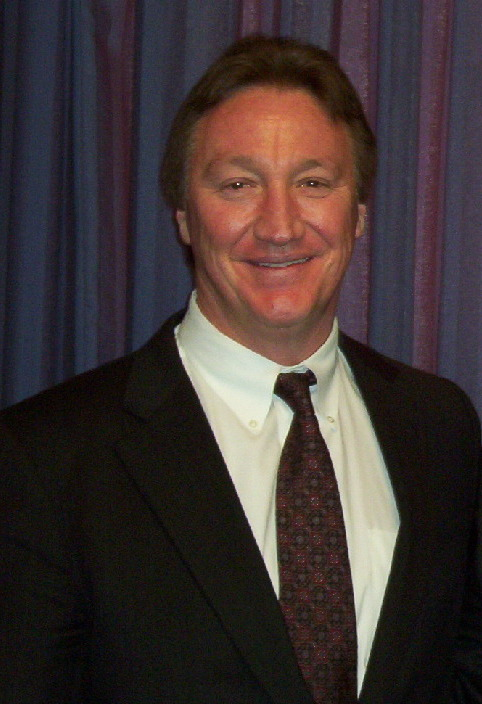
Alan Autry portrays Tom Kenderson, a Boston Red Sox player coming out as gay, in "The Boys in the Bar."

Recurring characters

- Jack (Jack Knight), a bar customer — first appearance is "Sam's Women" (1982); last appearance is "The Boys in the Bar" (1983)

One- or two-time characters

- Brandee (Angela Aames), a flirtatious blond female customer, whose looks attract men — "Sam's Women" (1982)
- Debra (Donna McKechnie), Sam's former wife (whose background has been omitted in some syndication prints) — "Sam's Women"
- Leo (Donnelly Rhodes), a customer whose son has a boyfriend — "Sam's Women"
- Big Eddie (Ron Karabatsos), a customer whose behavior and comments annoy everyone — "The Tortelli Tort"
- Lisa Pantusso (Allyce Beasley), daughter of Coach — "Coach's Daughter"
- Roy (Philip Charles MacKenzie), Lisa's fiancé, of whom Coach disapproves because of Roy's behavior and especially his treatment of Lisa — "Coach's Daughter"
- Chuck (Tim Cunningham), a janitor working for a laboratory that creates mutated viruses. Panicked, people sanitize everything to eliminate viruses after he leaves. — "Coach's Daughter" and "Showdown, Part Two". Actor Cunningham would portray the credited role of a recurring character, Tim, in later seasons.
- Rebecca Prout (Julia Duffy), Diane's friend — "Any Friend of Diane's". Actress Julia Duffy auditioned for Diane Chambers but did not get the part.
- Darrell Stabell (Macon McCalman), one of Norm's clients whom Norm is trying to impress by beer much less than he typically has — "Any Friend of Diane's"
- Herbert Sawyer (James Read), Norm's boss who almost sexually assaults Diane until Norm interrupts, causing Mr. Sawyer to fire him — "Friends, Romans, Accountants"
- The Little Girl (Julia Hendler) wanting to post an ad of a girls' school production of Twelve Angry Men — "Coach Returns to Action"
- Nina (Murphy Cross), Coach's apartment neighbor with whom he is infatuated — "Coach Returns to Action"
- Tour Guide (Bill Wiley), a driver who frequently brings in tourists to Cheers until Sam kicks him out — "Coach Returns to Action"
- Miss Gilder (Anne Haney), a highly qualified, experienced tutor responding to Carla's ad seeking a tutor — "Endless Slumper"
- Rick Walker (Christopher McDonald), an unlucky baseball player who starts to perform better after obtaining Sam's lucky bottle cap — "Endless Slumper"
- Mr. Phillips (Frank McCarthy), a bar customer waiting for an available table at Melville's restaurant — "One for the Book"
- Kevin (Boyd Bodwell), an aspiring monastic who wants to experience the bar only once before entering the monastery — "One for the Book"
- Buzz (Ian Wolfe), an elderly World War I survivor — "One for the Book"
- "Eric Finch" / Thomas Hillian III (Ellis Rabb), a millionaire who mostly fabricates stories of his own — "The Spy Who Came In for a Cold One"
- Lana (Barbara Babcock), an advertising agent who has a casual affair with Sam to advance his acting career — "Now Pitching, Sam Malone" (1983)
- Tibor Svetkovic (Richard Hill), a Czechoslovak ice hockey player struggling to understand English — "Now Pitching, Sam Malone"
- Luis Tiant (himself), a former Boston Red Sox baseball player appearing in a beer television commercial in which Sam also appears — "Now Pitching, Sam Malone"
- Marshall Lipton (Mark King) — a nerdy customer, who possesses a huge book of cybernetics and is attracted to Carla — "Let Me Count the Ways" and "Father Knows Last"
- Tom Kenderson (Alan Autry), a homosexual baseball teammate and friend of Sam Malone — "The Boys in the Bar"
- Walter Franklin (Doug Sheehan), one of Diane's dates who counts letters in any sentence said by anyone — "Diane's Perfect Date"
- Gretchen (Gretchen Corbett), Sam's blind date, set up by her friend Diane — "Diane's Perfect Date"
- Tip O'Neill (himself), a United States House Speaker and Massachusetts Representative — "No Contest"
- George Wheeler (Reid Shelton), a hustler who cons people at card games, like gin rummy and poker — "Pick a Con... Any Con"
- Helen Chambers (Glynis Johns), Diane's mother — "Someone Single, Someone Blue"
- Derek Malone (voiced by George Ball), an unseen character, Sam's more successful, handsome, and highly educated brother — "Showdown, Part One"
- Debbie (Deborah Shelton), one of Sam's dates — "Showdown, Part One"
- Cindy (Peggy Kubena), one of Sam's dates whose name he mistakes — "Showdown, Part Two"
- Lady #1 (Lois de Banzie) and Lady #2 (Helen Page Camp), two middle-aged female customers indecisive on what to order, irritating Carla, until they decide to order two boilermakers, a mixture of whiskey and beer — "Showdown, Part Two"

=== Season 2 ===
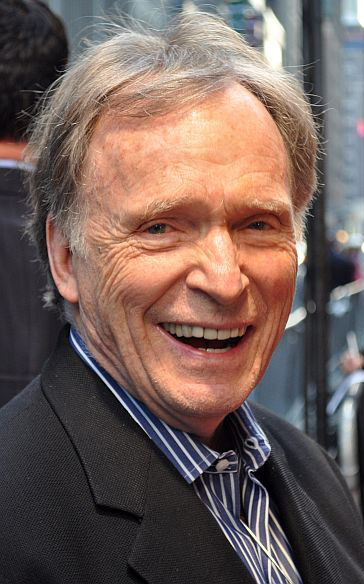
Dick Cavett appears as himself in "They Call Me Mayday".

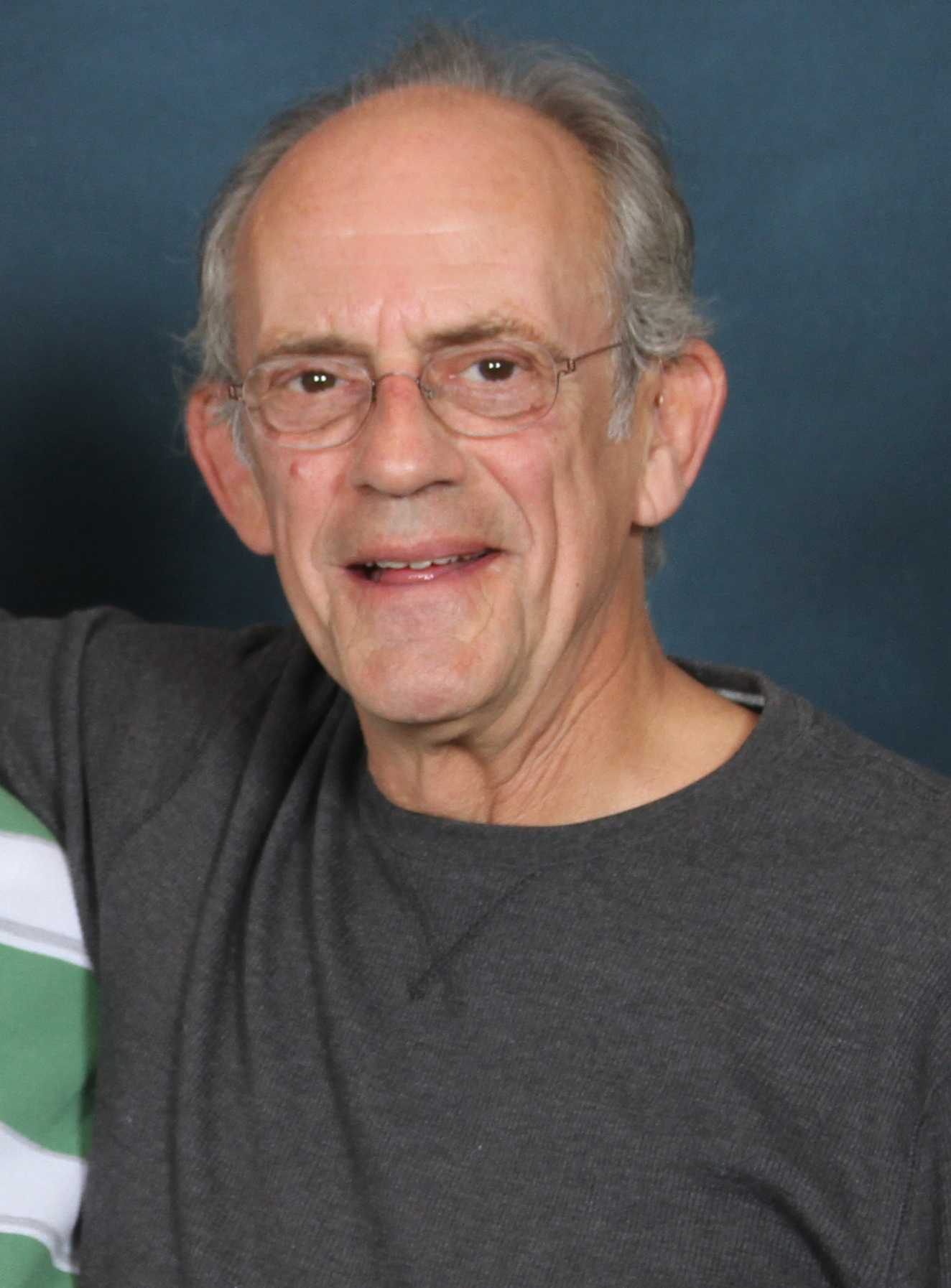
Christopher Lloyd portrays artist Philip Semenko in two parts of "I'll Be Seeing You."

- Annette Lozupone (Rhea Perlman), Carla's sister who flirts with every man, while she substitutes as a temporary waitress for Carla, who has given birth in the hospital — "Little Sister, Don't Cha" (1983)
- Mr. Anderson #1 (Tony Brafa) and Mr. Anderson #2 (James Ingersoll), whose surname for a table from Melville's was called, creating confusion — "Personal Business"
- Professor DeWitt (Severn Darden), one of Diane's professors, who comes to see Andy and Diane's test scene of Othello — "Homicidal Ham"
- Henry "Hank" Zenzola (Don Amendolia), one of Carla's dates with fatal heart condition — "Affairs of the Heart"
- Didi (Elizabeth McIvor), a woman whom Dave Richards sets his friend Sam up with — "Old Flames"
- Mort Sherwin (Herb L. Mitchell), who offers his friend Sam Malone a coaching position for his son's Little League Baseball team but then gives the position to Coach instead — "Manager Coach"
- Peewee (Elliott Scott), Moose (Corey Feldman), and Tank (Martin Davis), young players of the Little League team Titans — "Manager Coach"
- Dick Cavett (himself), a talk show host, whose publishers reject Sam Malone's proposed autobiography — "They Call Me Mayday"
- Wally Bodell (Walter Olkewicz), Norm's old high school wrestling rival, who dates with Vera while divorced from Norm for a while — "They Call Me Mayday"
- Phil Kepler (Kevin Rooney), a doctor, and Dave (Gerald Berns), both bar customers who sell their tickets of a boxing event featuring Marvelous Marvin Hagler to Diane for US$200 — "How Do I Love Thee, Let Me Call You Back"
- Heather Landon (Markie Post), an old friend of Diane, who is attractive and whose looks come between Sam and Diane — "Just Three Friends"
- Malcolm Kramer (George Gaynes), a wealthy customer, who has six months to live and then gives a signed will of $100,000 to Cheers — "Where There's a Will..."
- Dr. Paul Kendall (Allen Williams), a psychotherapist whose help Carla rejects — "Battle of the Exes" (1984)
- Becky Hawley (Barbra Horan), one of Sam's past dates — "No Help Wanted"
- Woman #1 (Milda Dacys) and Woman #2 (Robyn Peterson) who are repulsed by Norm and Cliff's moans during their standstills in the cold opening — "And Coachie Makes Three"
- Katherine (Eve Roberts), one of Coach's blind dates — "And Coachie Makes Three"
- Victor Shapone (Peter Iacangelo), a bar patron who demands Cliff to either tone down his know-it-all antics or leave the bar forever with shame — "Cliff's Rocky Moment"
- Tommy (Gary Gershaw), a postal worker whose boss tells him to not take another postal worker Cliff seriously — "Snow Job"
- George Foley (James Gallery), an unemployed man with whom Norm befriends, making Cliff jealous — "Snow Job"
- Tom (Fred Carney), Art (Arthur Lessac), Charlie (Don Bexley), Lefty (Jack O'Leary) — old baseball teammates of Coach (while Coach was a baseball player), who come to the funeral of their teammate T-Bone Scorpageoni, who made passes at their wives in the past — "Coach Buries a Grudge"
- Emily Philips (Anne Schedeen), Norm's new business client whom his friends encourages him to have an affair with — "Norman's Conquest"
- Philip Semenko (Christopher Lloyd), a painter whom Sam despises and whom Diane admires — Two parts of "I'll Be Seeing You"

=== Season 3 ===
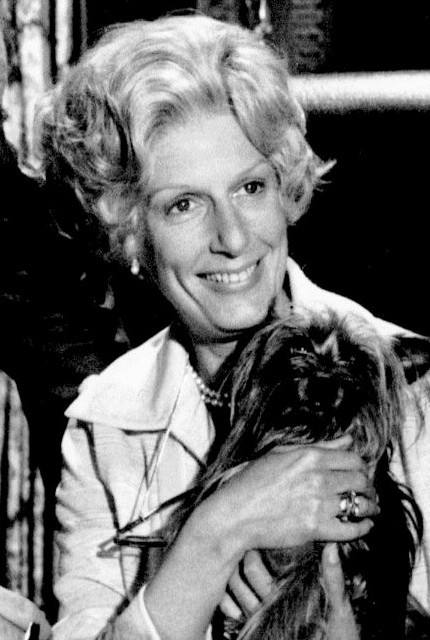
Nancy Marchand portrays Hester Crane, Frasier's mother, in "Diane Meets Mom". Rita Wilson would later portray the character in Frasier.

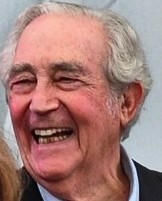
James Karen portrays Dr. Bennett Ludlow, Frasier's mentor who impregnates Carla in "Whodunit?"

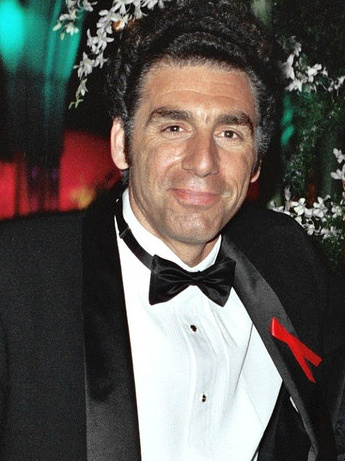
Michael Richards portrays Eddie Gordon, who wants to obtain Cheers from Sam if Sam doesn't marry the actress Jacqueline Bisset, in "Bar Bet".

- Julie (P. J. Soles), a waitress who resigns because Sam cheats on her with her sister — "Rebound, Part Two" (1984)
- Eddie (Mitch Kreindel), one of Carla's dates in whom she is uninterested — "I Call Your Name"
- Mr. Fancy Bottom (Erwin Fuller), a bar customer who earns a nickname from Diane for wanting his martini to be very drier than the martini she gave him — "I Call Your Name"
- Tinker Bell (Bernadette Birkett), a woman who wears the "Tinker Bell" costume at the Halloween party and becomes attracted to Cliff in his own costume — "Fairy Tales Can Come True"
- Marvin (Carmen Argenziano), a jealous husband whose wife Maxine (Kim Lankford) has an affair with Sam — "Sam Turns the Other Cheek"
- Irene Blanchard (Bette Ford) — Coach's fiancée who wins the lottery and then goes out with wealthy men — two-part episode "Coach in Love"
- Sue Blanchard (Ellen Regan) — Irene's daughter, who is repulsed by Sam's advances — "Coach in Love, Part One"
- Customer #1 (Alan Blumenfeld) — a bar customer annoyed by Cliff's loquacious demeanor and overemphasis on trivial matters — "Coach in Love, Part Two"
- Stanislav Lodz, an unseen foreign millionaire whom Irene would eventually marry — "Coach in Love, Part Two"
- Phil Ryan (Tom Kindle) — a phone company repairman hired by Sam without Coach's knowledge — "Diane Meets Mom"
- Hester Crane (Nancy Marchand), Frasier's mother, who threatens Diane if Diane continues dating Frasier — "Diane Meets Mom". Frasier mentions her as deceased in "Death Takes a Holiday on Ice" (1989). Rita Wilson would later portray this character in Frasier.
- Ben (Cory "Bumper" Yothers), a little boy who has Sam forging Carl Yastrzemski's signature on his brother's baseball — "Diane's Allergy"
- Amanda (Carol Kane), a mental ward patient, whom Diane befriended at the mental hospital and has poor relationships with men — "A Ditch in Time"
- Mona (Kate Williamson) and Todd (David Wiley), Amanda's parents — "A Ditch in Time"
- Stan (Ernie Sabella), a customer who, while waiting for a table at Melville's, is asked three questions about himself by Coach — "Whodunit?" (1985)
- Dr. Bennett Ludlow (James Karen), Frasier's mentor, who impregnates Carla with their son Ludlow Tortelli, whose name is eponymous with Bennett's surname — "Whodunit?"
- Lenny Barnes (John Hancock), a publicist for a charity softball game's chamber of commerce — "King of the Hill"
- Becky (Jeana Tomasina), Ginger (Heidi Sorenson), and Andrea (Ola Ray), softball players of Playboy Playmates — "King of the Hill". The portrayers were actual Playmates of the Month.
- Reporter (David Paymer) writing an article about the charity softball game featuring Playboy Playmates and Sam — "King of the Hill"
- Miss Alannah (or Alana) Purdy, an unseen geography high school teacher who slept with Sam and then gave him better grades than he deserved — "Teacher's Pet"
- Bambi (Debi Richter), one of Sam's casual dates — "The Mail Goes to Jail"
- Cop (Troy Evans) who arrests Norm for "mail theft"; in actuality, Norm was substituting for Cliff, who had a flu — "The Mail Goes to Jail"
- Paula Nelson (Alison La Placa), an intelligent, sophisticated magazine reporter, with whom Sam flirts and tries to impress — "Behind Every Great Man"
- Mr. Hecht (Richard Roat), Norm's (former) boss who promotes Norm into firing people from corporation, Talbot International — "The Executive's Executioner"
- Billy Richter (Mark Schubb), an accountant whom Norm fires, despite having done odd jobs to afford college, putting his house on mortgage, and having a pregnant wife — "The Executive's Executioner"
- Phil Wagner (Dean Dittman), a representative of Talbot International who is impressed with Norm's way of firing employees — "The Executive's Executioner"
- Michael (Randy Miller), an accountant fired from Talbot International by Norm — "The Executive's Executioner"
- John Parker (Warren Munson), a Talbot International employee whom Norm, while harsh, fails to convincingly fire — "The Executive's Executioner"
- Eddie Gordon (Michael Richards), a man who bets that Sam could lose the bar if Sam does not marry celebrity Jacqueline Bisset — "Bar Bet"
- Jacqueline Bisset (Laurie Walters), a woman not to be confused with the other Jacqueline Bisset and whom Sam bribes into marrying him to save the bar — "Bar Bet"
- Sydney (Rhonda Shear) and Brenda (Brynja Willis), applicants whom Carla refuses to hire as waitresses after seeing them flirting with Sam during interviews — "The Bartender's Tale"
- Lillian Huxley (Lila Kaye), a middle-aged experienced waitress, who cheers the crowd with singing and poetry — "The Bartender's Tale"
- Carolyn Huxley (Camilla More), Lillian's daughter, to whom Sam becomes attracted — "The Bartender's Tale"
- Drusilla Dimeglio (Camila Ashland), Carla's former high school principal, whom Carla has despised for years — "The Belles of St. Clete's"
- Kathy Settuducato (Kate Zentall), Donna Guzzo (Catherine Paolone), Roxanne Brewster (Marsha Warfield), and Mo McSweeney (Ellen Gerstein), Carla's friends back in high school — "The Belles of St. Clete's"
- Dan Corelli (James V. Christy), one of Coach's friends, whom Coach cannot recognize — "Rescue Me"
- The Waiter (Martin Ferrero) from Italy, whose restaurant owner recently died — "Rescue Me"

=== Season 4 ===
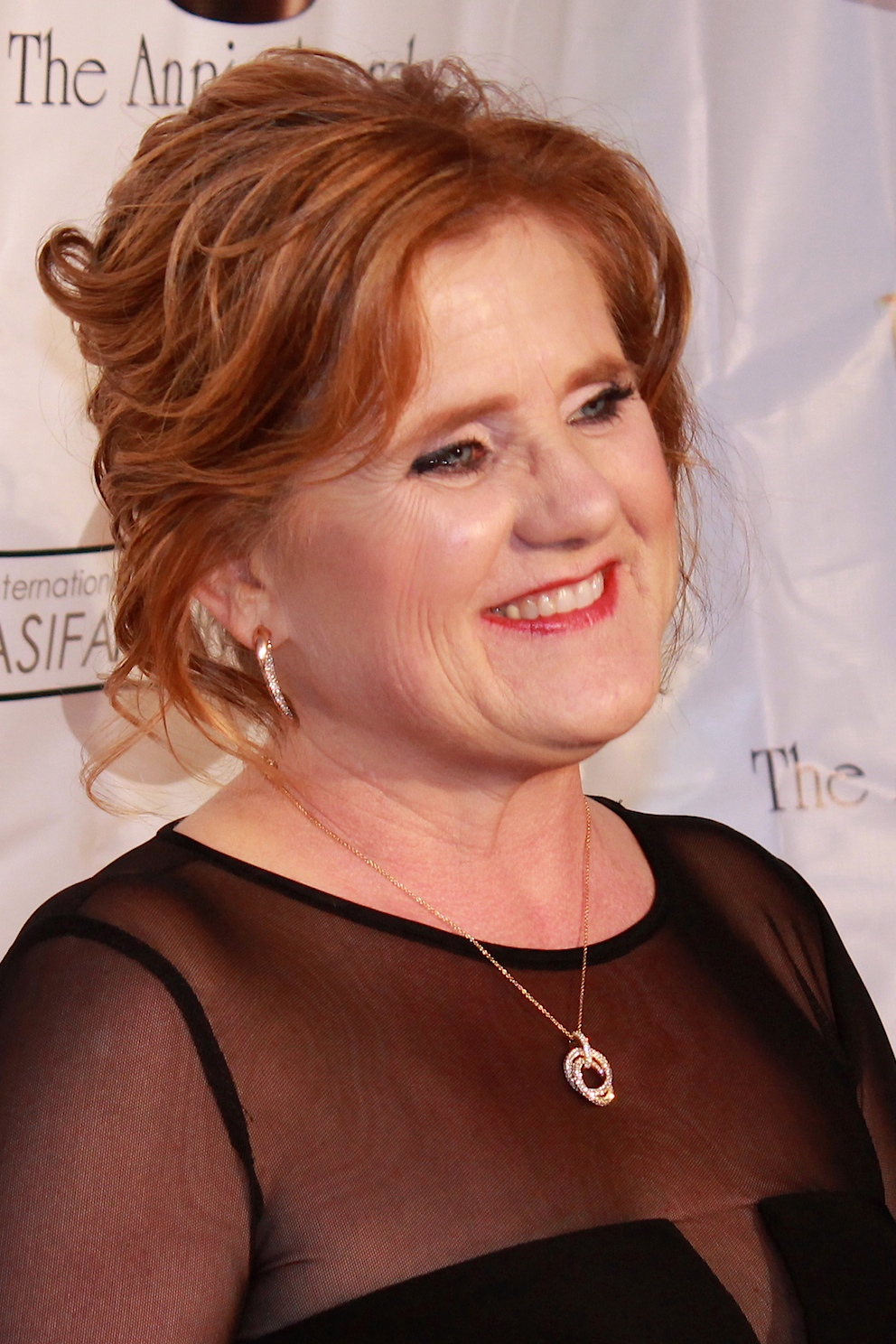
Nancy Cartwright portrays Cynthia, a supposed 'fiancée' of ex-convict Andy from Diane's dreams in "Diane's Nightmare".

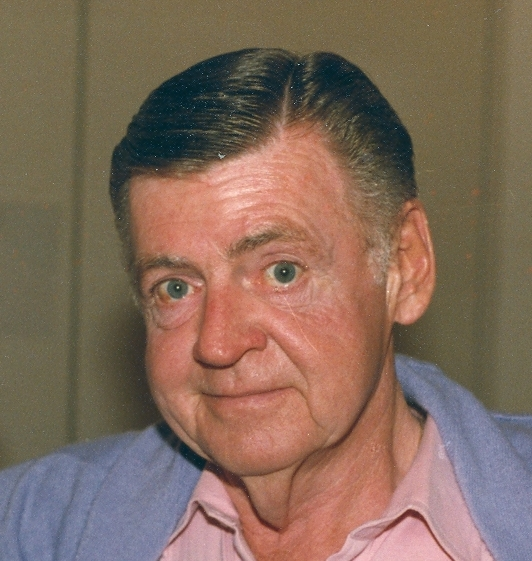
Dick O'Neill portrays Cliff Clavin Sr., long-lost father of Cliff Jr., in "The Barstoolie".

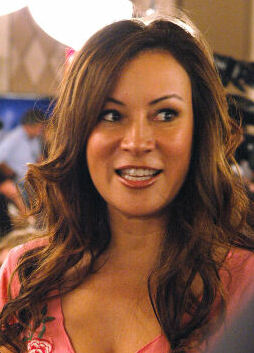
Jennifer Tilly portrays Candi, whom Frasier almost marries after a one night stand, in "Second Time Around".

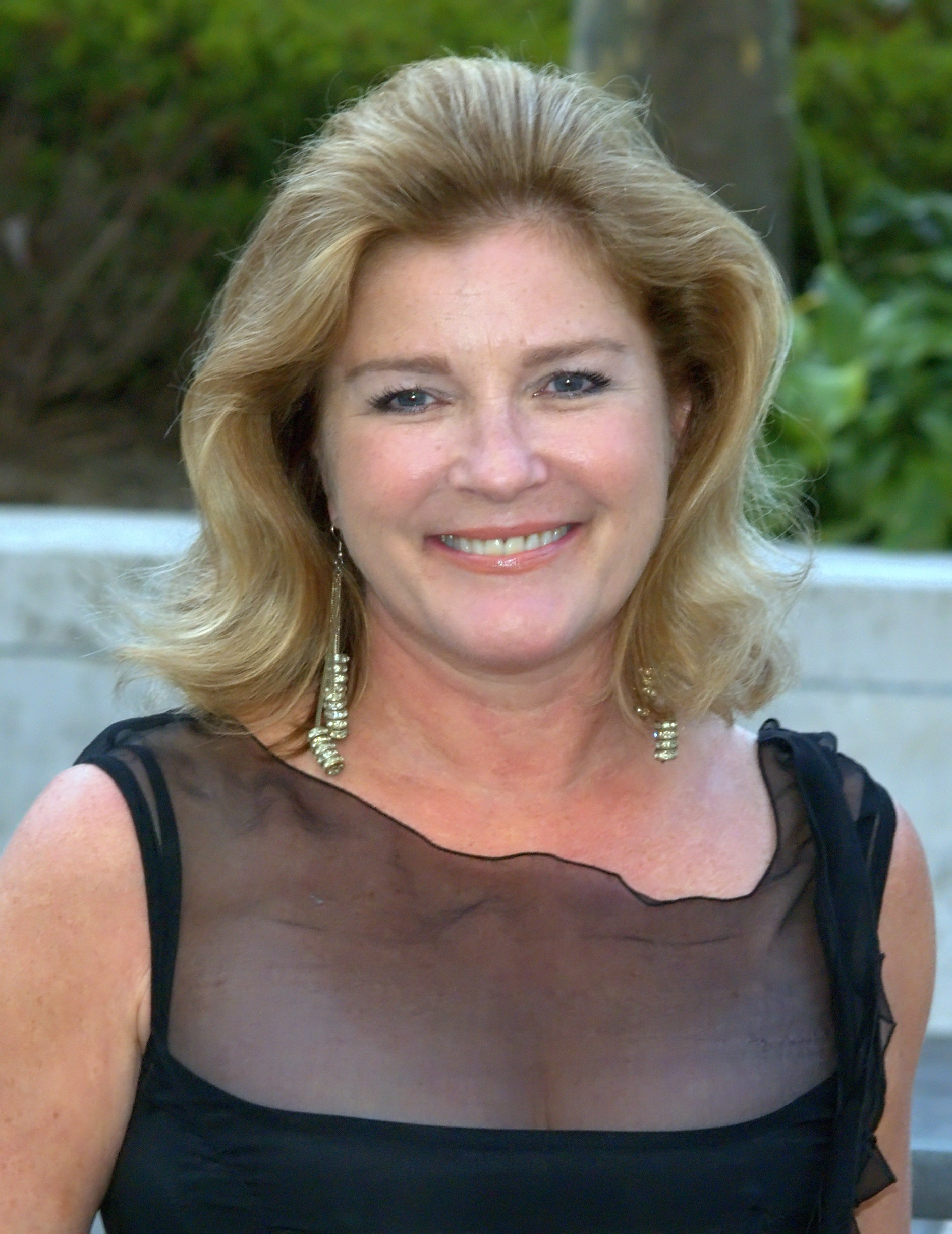
Kate Mulgrew portrays Janet Eldridge, a politician and one of Sam's love interests, in three-part season finale "Strange Bedfellows".

- Sisters Marie (Lois de Banzie) and Catherine (Patricia Huston), nuns of the convent, at where Diane atones her sins, such as promiscuity, after she left Frasier in Europe — "Birth, Death, Love, and Rice" (1985)
- Lisa (Liz Keifer), one of Sam's women, who flirts with Woody — "Woody Goes Belly Up"
- Stuart Sorenson (Frank Dent), one of Diane's fiancé, whom she finds not "physically attractive" — "Someday My Prince Will Come"
- Professor Moffat (John Ingle), whom Diane interviews with for a "teaching assistant position" — "The Groom Wore Clearasil"
- Cynthia (Nancy Cartwright), an ex-convict Andy's supposed 'fiancée', who turns out to be part of Diane's dream — "Diane's Nightmare"
- Guy (Rick Andosca) wanting to use men's restroom until he finds prolific amount of bar patrons stuck in there in the cold opening — "I'll Gladly Pay You Tuesday"
- Little Girl (Eve Glazier) from a girl scout group, selling cookies — "I'll Gladly Pay You Tuesday"
- Mr. Sayers (William Lanteau), a buyer who wants the first-edition of an Ernest Hemingway novel The Sun Also Rises from seller Diane Chambers — "I'll Gladly Pay You Tuesday"
- Sotto the Mime (Don Lewis), whom Diane hires to entertain bar customers, which Sam despises — "2 Good 2 Be 4 Real"
- Vinnie Claussen (Marc Alaimo), a funeral director who wants to date Carla by answering her dating ad — "2 Good 2 Be 4 Real"
- Frank (Richard Young and Jack (Frank Czarnecki), bar patrons whose physiques frighten Cliff, who guffaws at their orders, in the cold opening — "Love Thy Neighbor"
- Phyllis Henshaw (Miriam Flynn), Norm's neighbor whose husband is having a romantic affair with Norm's wife Vera — "Love Thy Neighbor"
- Santo Carbone (Ernie Sabella), a private detective, who is also Carla's cousin — "Love Thy Neighbor". Sabella previously appeared as Stan in "Whodunit?" from season 3.
- Tawny (unnamed actress), a woman belonging to Gary's Olde Towne Tavern bowling team — "From Beer to Eternity"
- Cliff Clavin Sr. (Dick O'Neill), Cliff's long-lost father — "The Barstoolie"
- Claudia (Claudia Cron), an intelligent woman who befriends Diane and briefly dates Sam, whom she finds too sexually aggressive — "The Barstoolie"
- Dr. Lowell Greenspon (Kenneth Tigar), one of Diane's professors — "Don Juan Is Hell". Actor Kenneth Tigar appeared in earlier episode "The Boys in the Bar".
- Reporter (Raf Mauro) from The Chronicle covering eccentric people and considers exemplifying Cliff, which Cliff declines — "Don Juan Is Hell"
- Frank (Arthur Taxler), a bar patron apparently flirting with Carla and wanting to order scotch and soda — "Fools and Their Money"
- Bert Simpson (Patrick Cronin), a television viewer who pays $300 for Sam's baseball shirt just to end its appearance and then returns it to Sam — "Take My Shirt... Please" (1986)
- Mr. (Robert Symonds) and Mrs. Brubaker (Frances Bay), Norm's clients — "Take My Shirt... Please"
- Irving (M. C. Gainey), a psychology student who teams with Diane for the 'suspicious man' charade on Cheers patrons — "Suspicion"
- Lucas (Timothy Scott), Carla's hippie blind date — "Cliffie's Big Score"
- Candi Pearson (Jennifer Tilly), one of Sam's women who is set up as Frasier's date; her given name was formerly spelled Candy, which failed to appeal — "Second Time Around"
- Justice of the Peace (Lou Fant) performing Frasier and Candi's wedding, halted by Diane — "Second Time Around"
- Vito Ragazoni (Adam Carl), a boy wanting to date one of Carla's daughters Anne-Marie — "The Peterson Principle"
- Jeff Robbins (Chip Zien), Norm's co-worker informing him about Norm's competitor Morrison (unseen character) having an affair with their boss Mr. Reinhardt's wife — "The Peterson Principle"
- Mr. Reinhardt (Daniel Davis), one of Norm's bosses, oblivious about the affair between his wife and Morrison, whom he promoted over Norm — "The Peterson Principle"
- Bonnie (Pamela Bach), a woman for whom Sam and Woody compete — "Dark Imaginings"
- Steve McDonough, credited as Doctor McNeese (Tim Dunigan), a hospital doctor who takes care of Sam's hernia and whom Diane tutored when he was in junior high school — "Dark Imaginings"
- Jack Turner (Thomas Callaway), a patient who befriends Sam in the hospital and who has a daughter named Judy (Lisa Vice) — "Dark Imaginings"
- Eddie Csznyk (Nick Dmitri), a dancer who is supposed to be Carla's dancing partner but then accidentally falls down the bar stairs, injuring him — "Save the Last Dance for Me"
- Cheryl Koski (Sinara Stull), one of Carla's old nemeses — "Save the Last Dance for Me"
- Floyd Panjeric (Hal Landon Jr.), a host of Boston Boppers and its reunion show, Boston Reunion Boppers — "Save the Last Dance for Me"
- Jack Dalton (Joseph Whipp), one of Diane's lovers back in Europe after she dumped Frasier; also an enthusiast of danger — "Fear Is My Co-Pilot"
- Dennis Kaufman (Tom Harrison), one of Diane's dates, who wears the Renaissance fair costume in public, prompting Diane to end the relationship — "Diane Chambers Day"
- Fred Anderson (Paul Eiding), a social director of Caribou Lodge who reserved a party at Cheers for his two other members (Jack M. Lindine and Terrence Beasor) — "Relief Bartender"
- Ken Charters (Tony Carriero), a bartender whom Sam hires and who has a wife (Patricia Veselich) with a son (Edan Gross) and daughter (Judith Barsi) — "Relief Bartender"
- Andrea (Kim Robinson), one of Sam's fiancées — "Relief Bartender"
- Brian (Brad Burlingame), one of Diane's dates — "Strange Bedfellows, Part One"
- April (Carolyn Ann Clark), one of Sam's dates — "Strange Bedfellows, Part One". Clark previously appeared in "Love Thy Neighbor".
- Phil Schumacher (David Paymer), campaign manager for Janet Eldridge — parts one and three of "Strange Bedfellows". Paymer previously appeared in "King of the Hill" (1985) as a reporter.
- Janet Eldridge (Kate Mulgrew), an intelligent politician, one of Sam's love interests — three parts of "Strange Bedfellows"
- Jim Fleener (Max Wright), Janet's political opponent, who eventually loses to her — first two parts of "Strange Bedfellows"
- Gary Hart (himself), a United States Senator from Colorado — "Strange Bedfellows, Part Two"

=== Season 5 ===
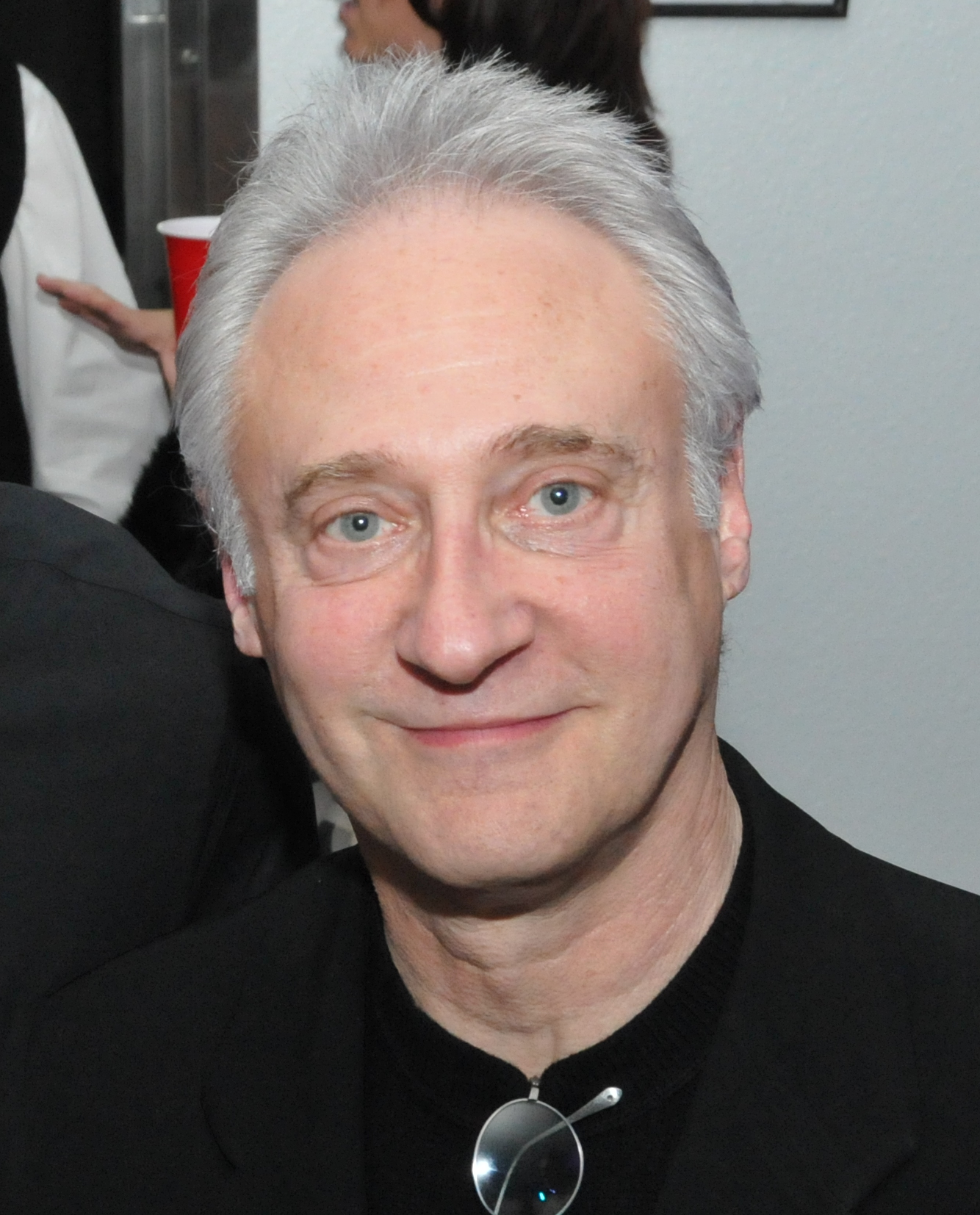
Brent Spiner portrays Mr. Bill Grand, whose wife dropped domestic abuse charges against him, in "Never Love a Goalie, Part Two".

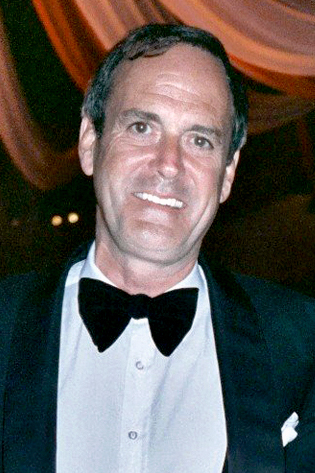
John Cleese portrays an expert, Dr. Simon Finch-Royce, in "Simon Says".

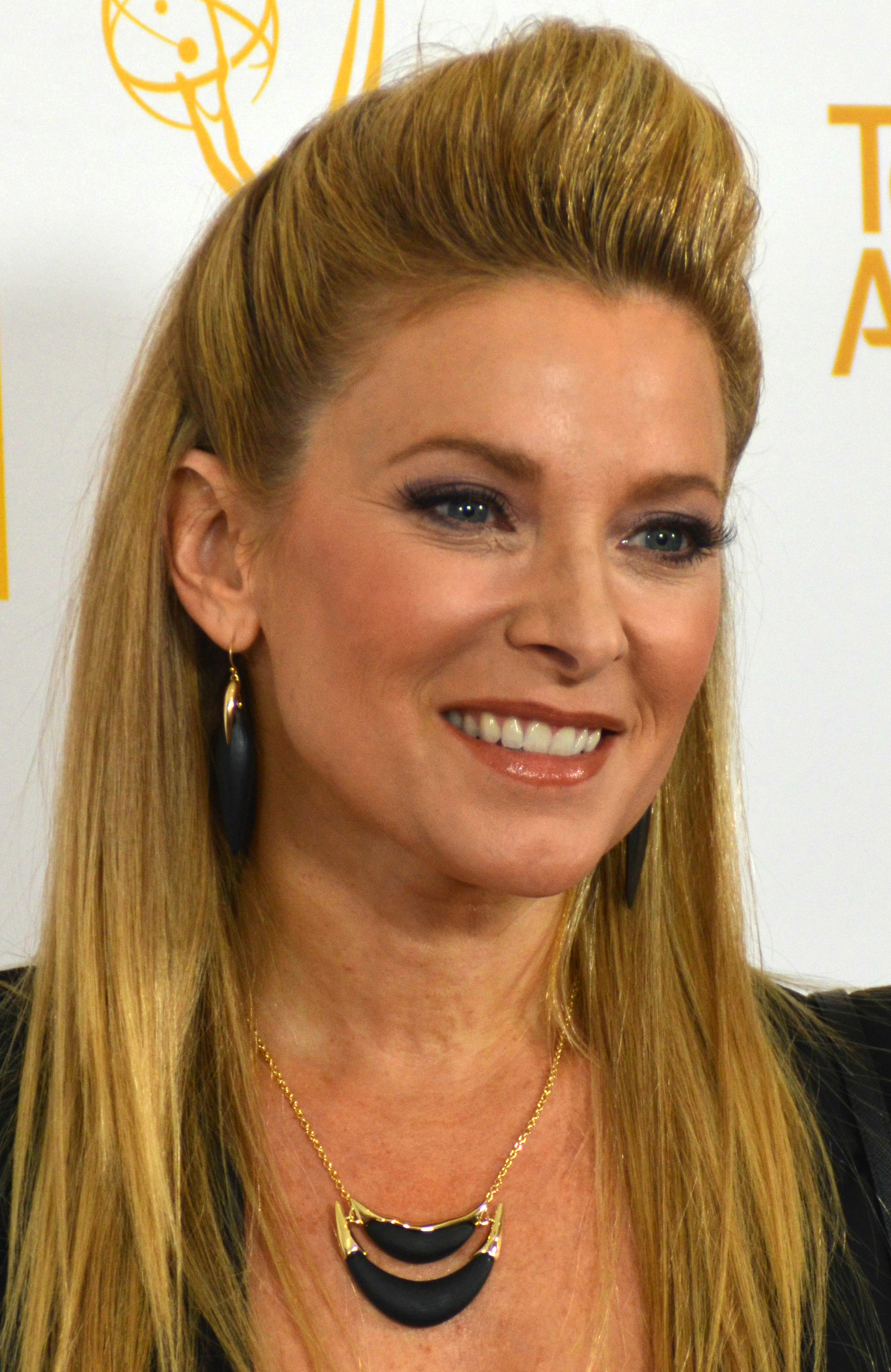
Cady McClain portrays Joyce, a niece of the late Coach Ernie Pantusso, in the episode "The Godfather, Part III".

- Vicki (Brenda Strong), whom he dates after his failed proposals with Diane — "The Cape Cad" (1986)
- Waiter (Willie Garson) of a Cape Cod inn that Sam is visiting — "The Cape Cad"
- Harvey (Sid Conrad), an inn patron whom Sam bribes with $50 to make noises with his wife (Kathryn White) with the intent to mislead Diane — "The Cape Cad"
- Duncan "Fitz" Fitzgerald (Richard Erdman), a wealthy man, who is engaged to Esther Clavin, Cliff's mother, until he dies by a heart attack — "Money Dearest"
- Mr. (Paul Lukather) and Mrs. Morton (Melinda Cordell), bar patrons who, out of sympathy for her hardships, give Carla a $10 tip. — "Young Dr. Weinstein"
- Dr. Julian Weinstein, an unseen doctor who does not remember one of his prep school classmates, Frasier Crane, and whom Sam impersonates at a highly reserved restaurant — "Young Dr. Weinstein"
- Jordon Brundage (Josh Clark), one of Diane's dates who eventually dumps her after a long wait at a restaurant — "Young Dr. Weinstein"
- Darlene (Kristi Somers), one of Sam's dates whom he brings alongside while impersonating Dr. Julian Weinstein — "Young Dr. Weinstein"
- Dr. Peter Fisher (Dennis Robertson), a colleague of Dr. Julian Weinstein, whom Sam impersonates at a highly reserved restaurant — "Young Dr. Weinstein"
- Lance Apollonaire (J. Eddie Peck), a college student whom Diane dates — "Knights of the Scimitar"
- High Sultan (Stephen Vinovich), the highest member of the Knights Club, which forbids members from offering services and then beer in club events and gatherings — "Knights of the Scimitar"
- Leonard Twilley (John Brace), a fiancé of Woody's ex-girlfriend Beth Curtis — "The Book of Samuel"
- Tina Wilson (Pamela A. Hedges), one of Sam's women whom Woody plans to date and then dump, which backfires when she overhears Woody — "The Book of Samuel"
- Desiree Harrison (Katherine McGrath), Sam's housekeeper, whom Woody schedules as his date just to impress his ex-girlfriend Beth — "The Book of Samuel"
- Leeza (Marilyn Lightstone), an assistant of Madame Likova (unseen), who finds Diane's dancing poor — "Dance, Diane, Dance"
- Joe (Patrick DeSantis), a bar customer in the cold opening who drank soda water and then flirts with Carla, who orders two martinis just to have a ride home together — "Chambers vs. Malone" (1987)
- Priest (Glen Vernon) reading Bible passages to Sam in Sam's fantasy where Sam would be executed for murdering Diane — "Chambers vs. Malone" (1987)
- Judge William E. Grey (Tom Troupe), who handles the assault case of Sam Malone, filed by Diane — "Chambers vs. Malone"
- A court bailiff (John Fleck) announcing that Mrs. Sherry Grand dropped domestic abuse charges against her husband Bill, much to the jurists' satisfaction but to Diane's displeasure — "Never Love a Goalie, Part Two"
- Bill (Brent Spiner) and Sherry Grand (Suzanne Collins), a couple from the domestic abuse court case that Diane was involved as a jurist — "Never Love a Goalie, Part Two"
- Rick (Tim Holland), a man who drives Diane to work when her car breaks down but whom Sam jealously mistakes as her date — "One Last Fling"
- Madeline Keith (Anita Morris), a married woman whose dog attacked Cliff during his postal duties and then seduces Cliff — "Dog Bites Cliff"
- Jill (Zetta Whitlow), one of Sam's past dates working for Dr. Lilith Sternin — "Dinner at Eight-ish"
- Dr. Simon Finch-Royce (John Cleese), a marital expert who believes that Sam and Diane are a mismatch — "Simon Says"
- Joyce Pantusso (Cady McClain), Coach's niece — "The Godfather, Part III"
- Warren Thompkins (Tegan West), Norm's colleague who steals his proposal that turns out to be "incomplete and insufficiently researched" — "Norm's Last Hurrah"
- Norm's supervisor (Neil Zevnik) who assumes him to be "Mr. Springsteen", a signed name that Norm used on a delivery invoice — "Norm's Last Hurrah"
- Bert (Douglas Seale) and Lillian Miller (Billie Bird), a married elderly couple who sells their house to Sam and Diane — "A House Is Not a Home"
- Naomi (Stephanie Walski), one of Bert and Lillian's granddaughters who desirably wants presents at a summer Christmas party — "A House Is Not a Home"
- David (Marc Smollin), one of Bert and Lillian's grandsons singing "Let It Snow" alongside other party guests at a summer Christmas party — "A House Is Not a Home"
- Justice of the Peace (Walter Addison) performing Sam and Diane's wedding at the Cheers bar, which is halted when Diane decides to hone her writing talents — "I Do, Adieu"

=== Season 6 ===
Recurring characters

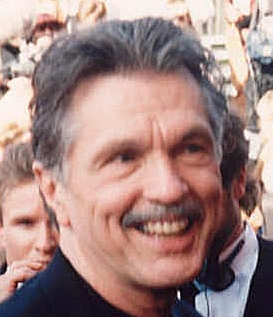
Tom Skerritt portrays Evan Drake, one of superiors for the Lillian Corporation, which owns Cheers from seasons six to eight, for only the sixth season.

- Evan Drake (Tom Skerritt), one of Rebecca's corporate bosses, whom Rebecca has a crush on but is too shy to admit her feelings toward him — his first appearance is "A Kiss Is Still a Kiss". Rebecca wants desperately to impress him enough that he would notice her on a romantic level. Rebecca becomes increasingly neurotic around Mr. Drake, and she finds herself having to explain herself out of ridiculous situations. For example, Drake made her hire a young woman as a waitress, and Rebecca assumed she was his mistress. After confronting her and hitting her across the face, it is revealed that the woman was Drake's daughter, not his lover. She explains away the punch with a phony "nerve disorder" diagnosis. Another time, when Norm is hired to paint Drake's bedroom, Rebecca comes along to see "where he sleeps," in a vain effort to be closer to him. When Drake comes back unexpectedly from a business trip, Rebecca is forced to stay in the closet while he sleeps. When trying to escape, she only gets as far as his bed, where she had to roll under. She is finally freed after she climbs out a window when Norm persuades a delirious Drake to "let [him] carry a rich man across the lawn in his pajamas." In his last appearance, "Backseat Becky, Up Front", Mr. Drake leaves for Japan. Rebecca hijacks his limousine and tries to confess her feelings for him. However, she sees him with another woman, letting Rebecca down.

One-time characters

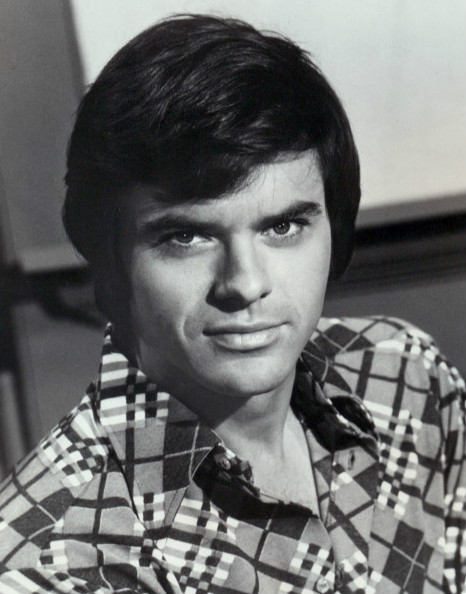
Robert Urich (pictured in 1973), leading actor of Spenser: For Hire, portrays himself in "Woody for Hire Meets Norm of the Apes".

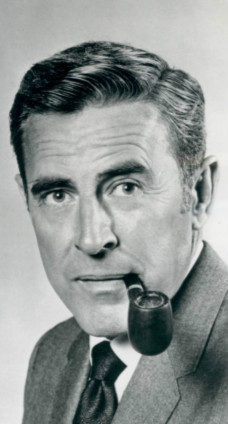
Peter Hansen portrays Daniel Collier, a CEO of Lillian Corporation in "And God Created Woodman".

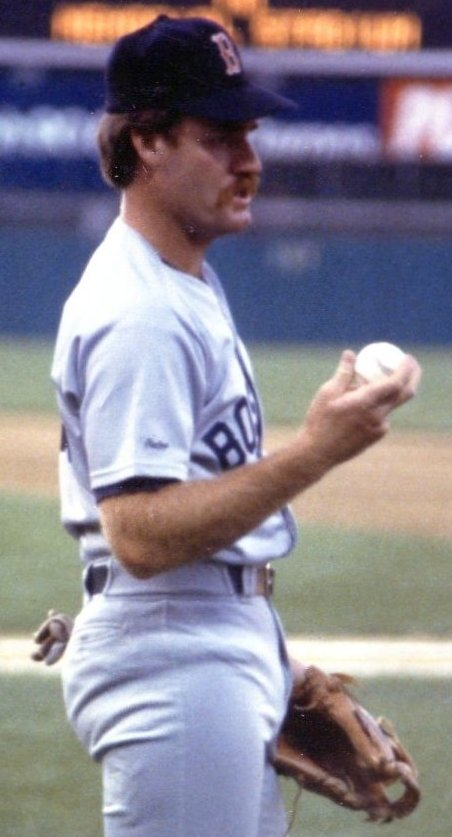
Wade Boggs, a Boston Red Sox baseball player, portrays himself in "Bar Wars".

- Wayne (Jonathan Stark), a relief bartender who loses his job by losing the bet on successfully making fictional cocktail "Screaming Viking" — "Home Is the Sailor" (1987). Portrayer Jonathan Stark also has written several Cheers episodes.
- Dr. Buzz (J. Stephen Coyle), a weatherman for a news program on Boston's Channel 13 — "'I' on Sports"
- Mama LeBec (Janet Brandt), mother of Eddie — two parts of "Little Carla, Happy at Last"
- Bandleader (Ron Husmann), an emcee at Carla and Eddie's wedding reception — "Little Carla, Happy at Last: Part 2"
- Bob (Ralph Peduto), also called Bobby, a deliveryman of a pretzel business — "The Crane Mutiny"
- Jim McNulty, one of Cliff's neighbors living near Cliff's former house and petitioning to save their neighborhood from developers wanting to build strip malls — "The Last Angry Mailman"
- William Cronin (Don Sparks), a real estate agent to whom Cliff's mother Esther sells their old, former house — "The Last Angry Mailman"
- Emcee (Gary Beach), an auctioneer holding a charity auction of bachelors — "Bidding on the Boys"
- Connie (Sharon Barr), a cigarette-smoking woman with a red dress, who bids on Woody Boyd during bachelor audition — "Bidding on the Boys". Barr would later portray a different role in "Norm's Big Audit".
- Grif Palmer (John Paragon), the director of a community theater production of Authors in Hell, a play featuring Mark Twain, the Algonquin Round Table, Satan, and Incubus — "Pudd'n Head Boyd"
- Mary (Anne Pitoniak), an elderly woman, who befriends Woody while he wears the Mark Twain costume — "Pudd'n Head Boyd"
- Assistant #1 (Tom Ohmer) and assistant #2 (Christian J. LeBlanc) working for a Lillian Corporation executive Evan Drake — "A Kiss Is Still a Kiss"
- Philip and Steven (Philip and Steven Ross), twin brothers in the cold opening wanting to order alcoholic beverages until one of them is unable to provide identification — "My Fair Clavin"
- Sally (Karen Akers), Cliff's one-time girlfriend, whose homely appearances are changed by a makeover — "My Fair Clavin"
- Jeff (John Allen), one of Cliff's neighbors living near his newer apartment and who briefly dates Sally with her new makeover — "My Fair Clavin"
- Tracy (Jayne Modean), a woman whose Christmas presents are sold to Sam — "Christmas Cheers"
- Fake Santa Clauses (Donavon O'Donnell, Hal Havins, Joseph V. Perry), co-workers from a class where Norm learns how to act as Santa Claus — "Christmas Cheers"
- Kris (Harry Frazier), a man who is believed to be (implicitly) the real Santa Claus — "Christmas Cheers"
- Robert Urich (himself), an actor whom Woody met at the set of Spenser: For Hire — "Woody for Hire Meets Norm of the Apes" (1988)
- Daniel Collier (Peter Hansen), a corporate CEO, who hires Rebecca to cater a party — "And God Created Woodman"
- Linda (Jude Mussetter), a woman with whom Sam attempts to flirt without avail — "And God Created Woodman"
- Laurie (Bobbie Eakes), Evan Drake's daughter — "A Tale of Two Cuties"
- Julia (Dorothy Parke), one of Sam's dates who eventually sleeps with Lorenzo (Tom Astor), Evan Drake's servant — "Yachts of Fools"
- Karen (Karen Witter), one of Frasier's patients who stripteases for his bachelor party until he recognizes her, halting the performance — "To All the Girls I've Loved Before"
- Randy (Deke Anderson), a male stripper for Lilith's bachelorette party — "To All the Girls I've Loved Before"
- Greyson (Jay Bell), Evan Drake's butler — "Let Sleeping Drakes Lie"
- Jennifer McCall (Cec Verrell), one of Frasier's patients who is a pyromaniac — "Let Sleeping Drakes Lie"
- Murray Treadwell (Peter Elbling), a Boston critic who usually give the bar Cheers bad reviews — "Airport V"
- Mimi (Pamela Bowen), Sam's (temporary) secretary when he is a substitute sales executive of the Lillian Corporation — "The Sam in the Gray Flannel Suit"
- Mr. Heppel (Vince Howard), an actual sales executive of the Lillian Corporation's eastern sales division, whom Sam unknowingly substitutes for the company's softball season — "The Sam in the Gray Flannel Suit" and "Backseat Becky, Upfront"
- Larry the Mailman (Eric Menyuk), a postal worker in the cold opening — "Our Hourly Bread"
- #66 (Ron Boussom) and #99 (Thomas Ryan), participants of the contest for the Caribbean cruise — "Our Hourly Bread"
- Cherry (Cynthia Songe), a waitress who is fired by Rebecca for going topless — "Slumber Party Massacred"
- Dorothy Greenberg (Elizabeth Ruscio), Lilith's childhood friend — "Slumber Party Massacred"
- Exterminator #2 (Phil Morris), one of patrons from Gary's Olde Towne Tavern posing as an exterminator for one of Gary's revenge plots — "Bar Wars"
- Jensen (Tom Risqui), a Cheers newcomer whom the bar patrons mistake as part of Gary's gang and an impostor enough to harass him — "Bar Wars"
- Wade Boggs (himself), a Boston Red Sox baseball player — "Bar Wars"
- Caroline (Carol Francis), a woman whom Sam kisses as one of his ploys to prompt Rebecca into kissing him — "The Big Kiss-Off"
- Martin (Ron Barker), Evan Drake's chauffeur — "Backseat Becky, Upfront"

=== Season 7 ===
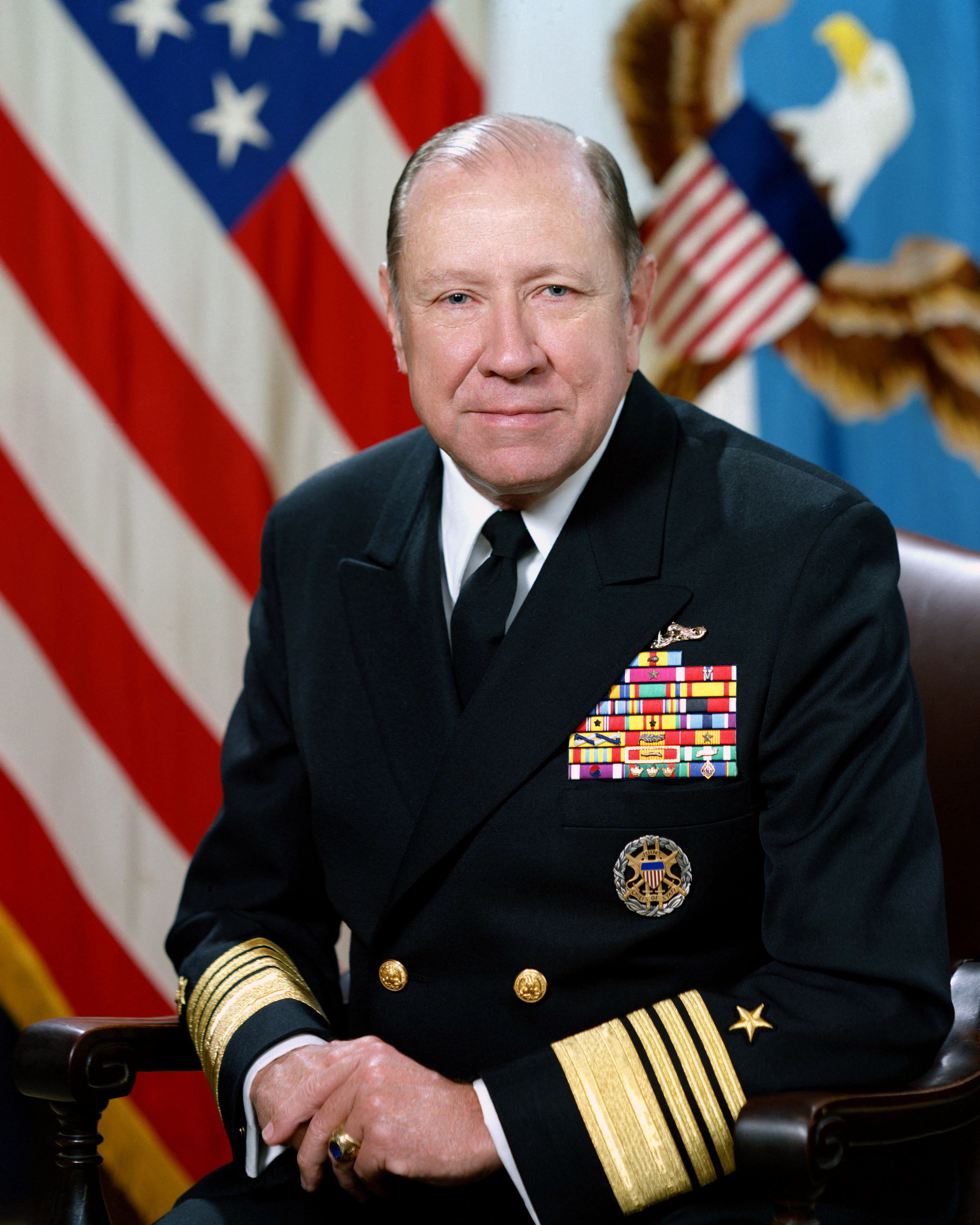
Admiral William J. Crowe portrays himself in "Hot Rocks".

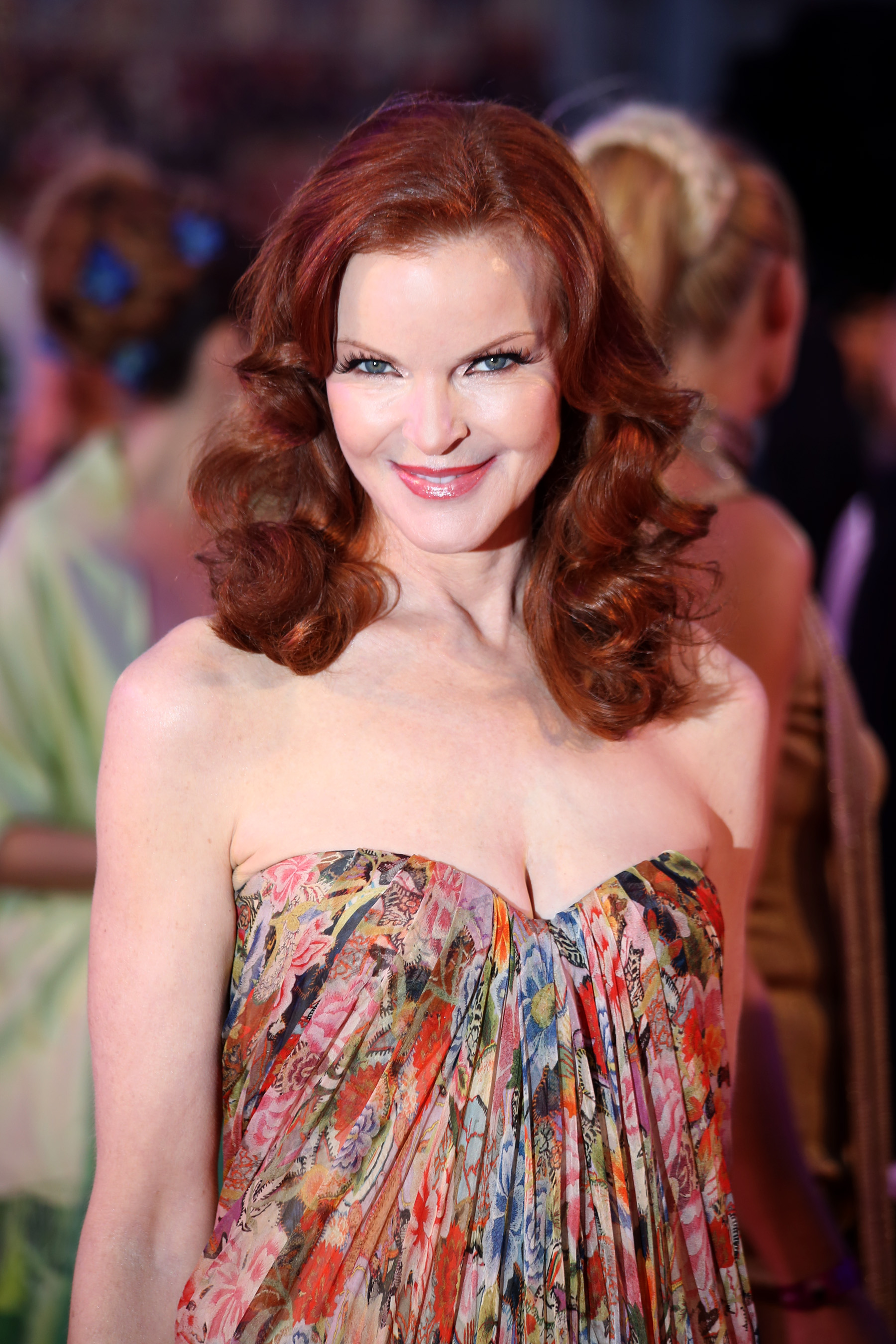
Marcia Cross portrays Rebecca Howe's sister, Susan, in "Sisterly Love".

- Greg Stone (Brian Bedford), Rebecca's corporate vice president — "How to Recede in Business" (1988). He is fired off-screen in "Executive Sweet".
- Suzanne Porter (Shanna Reed) and Rachel Patterson (Kim Johnston Ulrich), Sam's casual interests — "Swear to God"
- Martin Teal (Alex Nevil), Rebecca's boss, who replaces Greg Stone and whose short stature repulses Rebecca secretly — "Executive Sweet" and "One Happy Chappy in a Snappy Serape"
- Dennis Teal (Gerald Hiken), Martin's father, who is also his servant — "Executive Sweet" and "One Happy Chappy in a Snappy Serape"
- Ramon (Marco Hernandez), Sam's temporary Mexican bartender — "One Happy Chappy in a Snappy Serape"
- Franzi Schrempf (Isa Anderson), a prominent East German ice skater, who appears in Eddie's ice shows, making Carla jealous — "Those Lips, Those Ice"
- Ivan (B.J. Turner), an interior decorator, whom the Cranes fire — "Norm, Is That You?"
- Robert and Kim Cooperman (George Deloy and Jane Sibbett), married upper-class couple, who hires Norm to have their house redecorated — "Norm, Is That You?"
- Bob Speakes (J. Kenneth Campbell), a skydiving instructor — "Jumping Jerks"
- Judy (Sandahl Bergman) and Laurie (Chelsea Noble), a mother and daughter whom Sam is attracted to — "Send in the Crane" (1989)
- Sir Broundwin the Gallant, also called Buster, a champion dog belonging to one of Rebecca's corporate bosses Mr. Sheridan — "Adventures in Housesitting"
- Satan, an attack dog belonging to a wrecking yard and resembling Buster — "Adventures in Housesitting"
- Nash (Tyrone Power Jr.), Kelly's then-boyfriend — "Golden Boyd"
- Mr. Anawalt (Stefan Gierasch), one of Rebecca's corporate executives, who is charged by FBI with insider trading — "Don't Paint Your Chickens"
- FBI Agents Adams (Ralph Meyering Jr.) and Thompson (Mark Legan), who arrest Mr. Anawalt — "Don't Paint Your Chickens"
- Erin (Lisa Aliff), one of Sam's casual interests, who is athletic — "Don't Paint Your Chickens"
- Admiral William J. Crowe (himself), the Chairman of the Joint Chiefs of Staff — "Hot Rocks"
- Dr. Sheila Rydell (Madolyn Smith), Frasier and Lilith's colleague and one of Sam's dates — "What's Up Doc?"
- John (Bruce French), one of Frasier's patients claiming to be an astronaut, then "the Queen of Spain", and then the "eastern seaboard" — "The Gift of the Woodi"
- Susan Howe (Marcia Cross), Rebecca's estranged sister — "Sisterly Love". Joan Severance was originally intended to portray this role.
- Dr. Lawrence Crandell (John McMartin), a married psychiatrist, who sexually harasses Rebecca and has a brief affair with a maid named Maria (Fabiana Udenio) — "The Visiting Lecher"
- Valerie Crandell (Joanna Barnes), Lawrence's wife — "The Visiting Lecher"
- Zoltan (Nicholas Miscusi), violinist — "The Visiting Lecher"

=== Season 8 ===
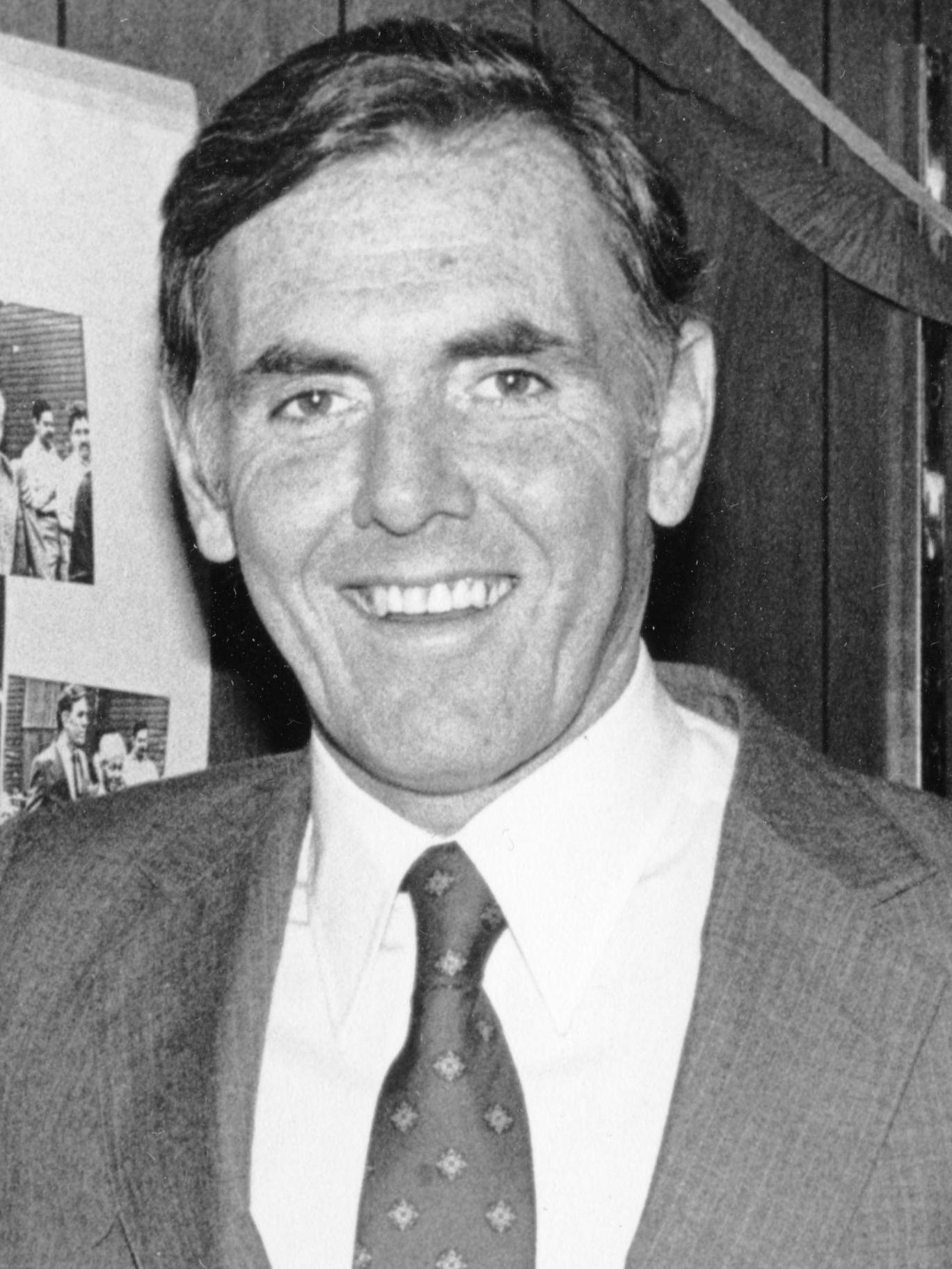
Boston Mayor Raymond Flynn portrays himself in "The Stork Brings a Crane".

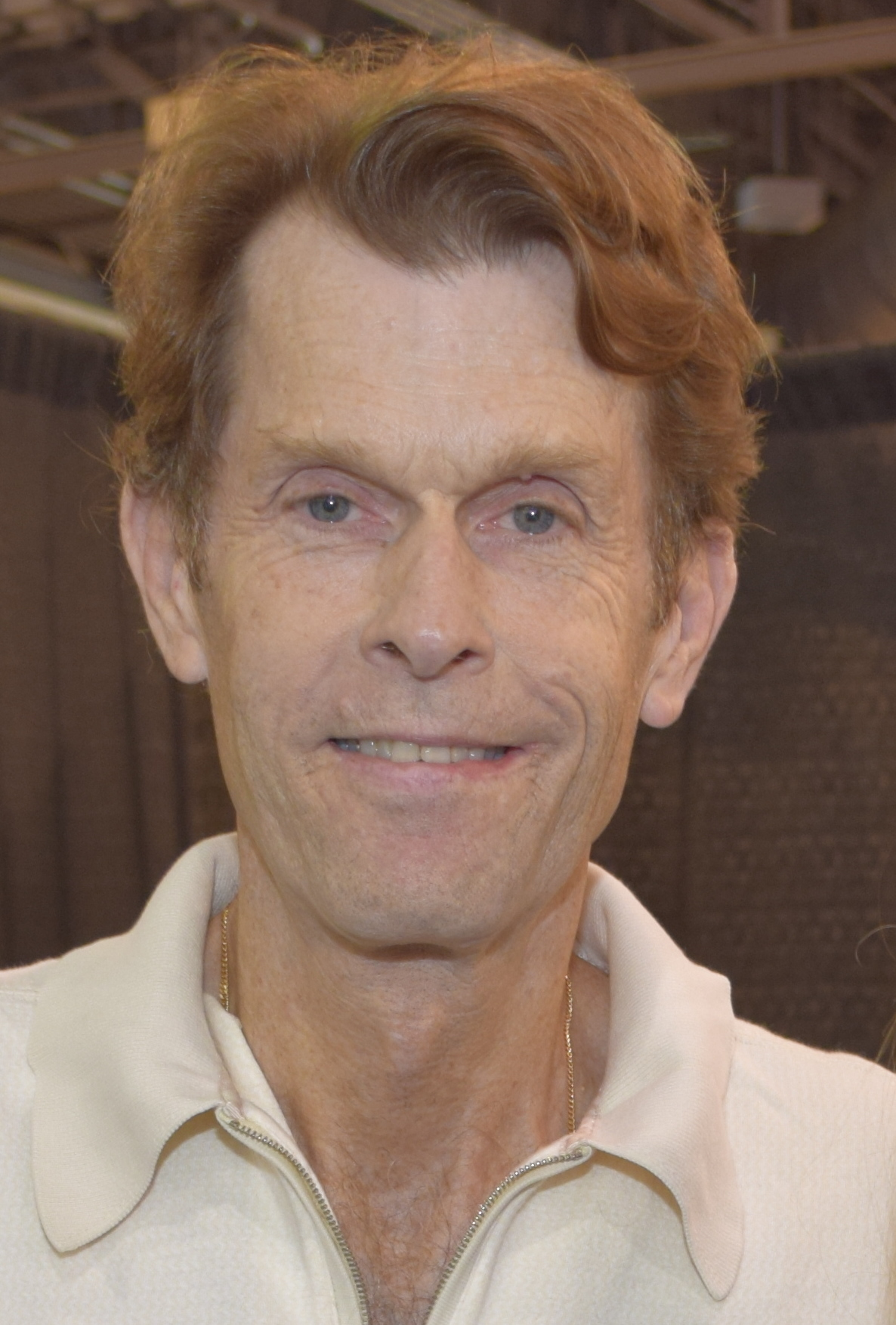
Kevin Conroy portrays a Boston Red Sox player Darryl Mead, whom Carla dates in "The Ghost and Mrs. Lebec" after her husband Eddie's death.

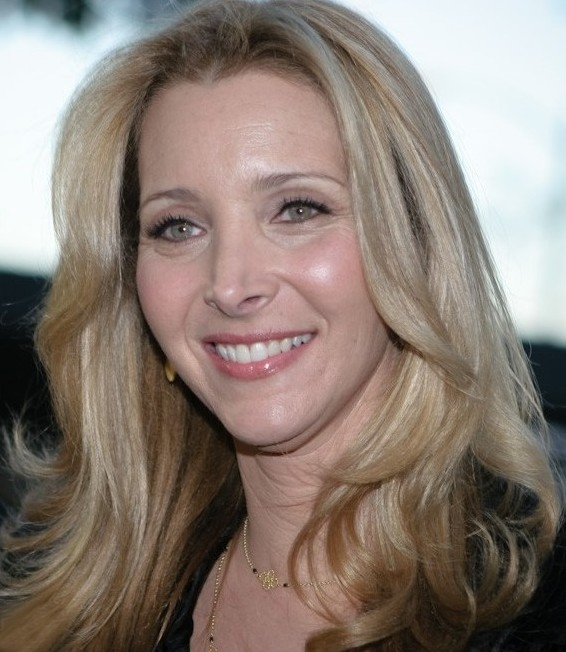
Lisa Kudrow portrays a community theater actress Emily in "Two Girls for Every Boyd."

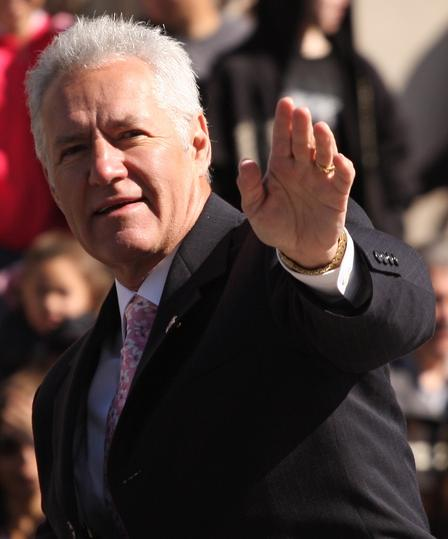
Jeopardy! host Alex Trebek portrays himself in "What Is... Cliff Clavin?"

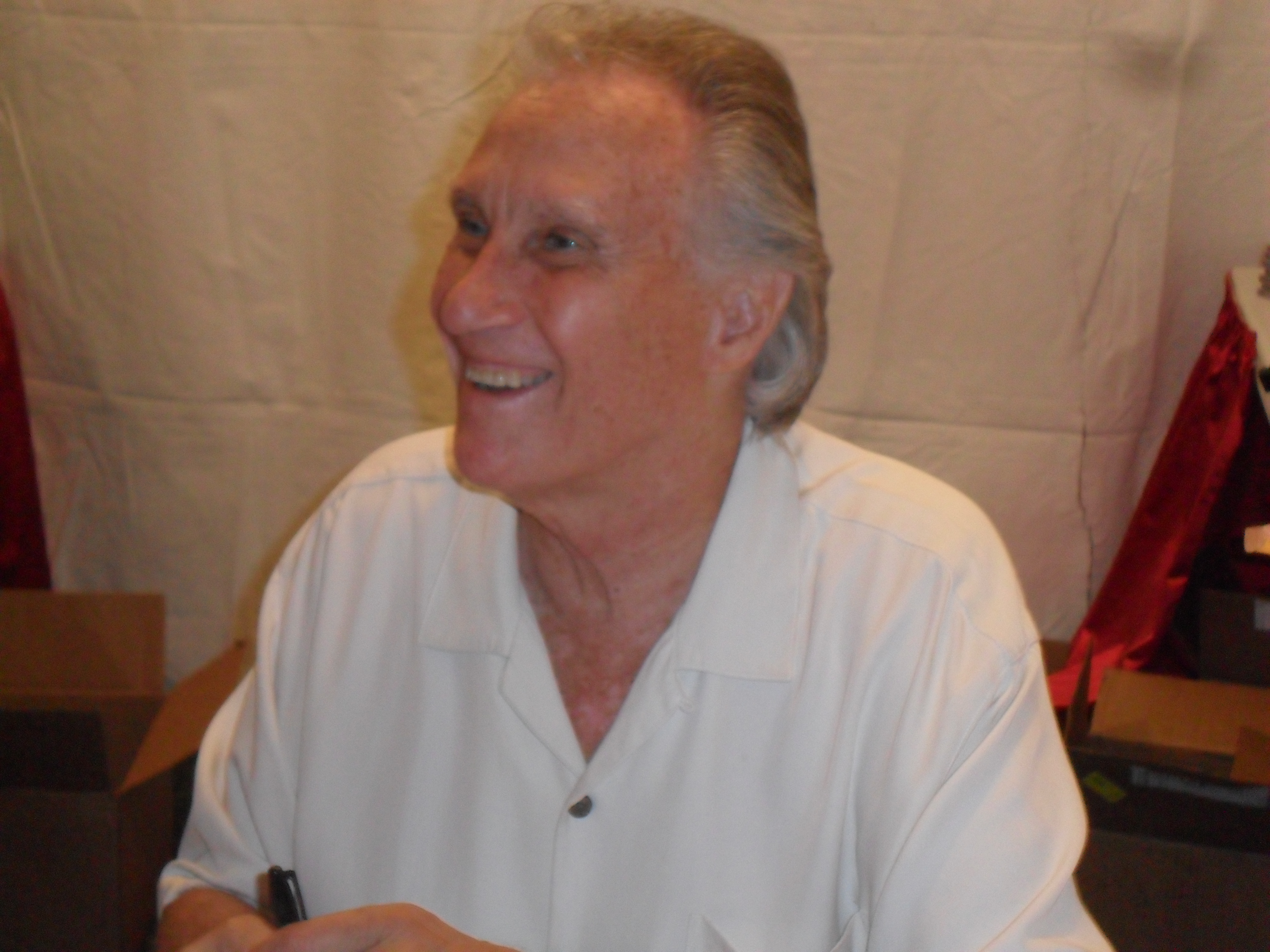
Bill Medley portrays himself in two parts of "Finally!", performing Rebecca's favorite song "You've Lost That Lovin' Feelin'."

- Miles (Webster Williams), millionaire Robin Colcord's chauffeur — "The Improbable Dream, Part 2" (1989), "How to Marry a Mailman" (1989), "Finally! Part 1" (1990)
- Marie (Valerie Hartman), one of Sam's casual interests — "The Improbable Dream, Part 2" (1989)
- Rudy (Eric Allan Kramer), one of Norm's house painting workers, who finds out Norm's "masquerade" as a nonexistent co-boss "Anton Kreitzer" — "The Two Faces of Norm"
- Dennis Hammill (Rob Moran), a customer wanting to buy Sam's Corvette — "The Two Faces of Norm"
- Jennifer (Jacqueline Alexandra Citron) and Veronica (Kristen Amber Citron), twins scoffing Sam's Volaré, which he temporarily uses — "The Two Faces of Norm"
- Doris (Cynthia Stevenson), Norm's secretary of his painting business who lacks self-confidence — "The Two Faces of Norm" and "Feeble Attraction" (1989)
- Mayor Raymond Flynn (himself), a Mayor of Boston — "The Stork Brings a Crane"
- Mr. Weaver (Monty Ash) — a 106-year-old man groping women and, in one occasion, faking a heart attack just to impress them — "The Stork Brings a Crane"
- Gail Aldrich (Victoria Hoffman), a pregnant woman whose husband is on military duty and whose parents live in Michigan, prompting Sam and Woody to assist her childbirth in a hospital — "The Stork Brings a Crane"
- Nurse (Laura Robinson), a hospital nurse, also one of Sam's casual interests — "The Stork Brings a Crane"
- Doctor (Michael Ennis), Lilith's doctor who discharges her after having a contraction — "The Stork Brings a Crane"
- Darryl Mead (Kevin Conroy), a Boston Red Sox baseball player whom Carla dates since her husband Eddie LeBec's death — "Death Takes a Holiday on Ice" (1989) and "The Ghost and Mrs. Lebec" (1990)
- Gloria (Anne De Salvo), a woman from Kenosha, Wisconsin, whom Eddie married when she was pregnant with twins, while Eddie is still married with Carla — "Death Takes a Holiday on Ice" (1989) and "50–50 Carla" (1990)
- Gordie Brown (Thomas Haden Church), an ice show performer whom Eddie saved from an ice resurfacer that Eddie fell into, leading to Eddie's death — "Death Takes a Holiday on Ice" (1989)
- Larry (Jay Robinson), a very dull corporate employee who plans to marry a wet T-shirt contestant Tanya (Melanie Kinnaman), whom he met during his retirement party, much to a pleasure of his brother-in-law Mr. Sheridan, who wants him out of the house after retirement — "For Real Men Only"
- Dr. Levinson (Rick Podell), a doctor performing Frederick's circumcision during the bris — "For Real Men Only"
- Emily (Lisa Kudrow), an actress portraying Emily, similar to her given name, in a community theater production of Our Town — "Two Girls for Every Boyd"
- Lee Bradken (Jeffrey Richman), the director of a community theater production of Our Town — "Two Girls for Every Boyd"
- Ron (Ebbe Roe Smith), an assisting crew of a community theater production of Our Town — "Two Girls for Every Boyd"
- Alice Anne Volkman (Alexis Smith), one of Rebecca's older business school professors, who wrote a book about business and has sex with Sam a couple of times — "Sammy and the Professor" (1990)
- Waiter (Dietrich Bader) serving Sam, Rebecca (later replaced by Woody), and Professor Volkman at one table of Melville's restaurant — "Sammy and the Professor"
- Donald Zajac (Stack Pierce), an IRS agent taking Carla under custody while she is audited, especially after his friend Norm spoils a hint about her finances — "Sammy and the Professor"
- Earl (Bernard Kuby), a bar patron returning to Cheers for the first time after he moved to Alaska for his job in the 1960s and then pointing out how the interior of Cheers changed over the years — "What Is... Cliff Clavin?"
- Alex Trebek (himself) and Johnny Gilbert (himself), the host and the announcer, respectively, of the current version of the game show Jeopardy! — "What Is... Cliff Clavin?"
- Milford Reynolds (William A. Porter), a Jeopardy! contestant who is a doctor of neurosurgery and loses all of $750 after wagering all of the winnings with an incorrect response at the final round
- Agnes Borsic (Audrey Lowell), a Jeopardy! contestant who, at the final round, eventually becomes the top winner with a $400 score despite losing $2900 with her incorrect response and after other contestants wager and then lose all of their winnings with their own incorrect responses — "What Is... Cliff Clavin?"
- Timmy (Greg E. Davis), a teenage boy who steals Sam's "little black book" and impersonates Sam to schedule dates — "What Is... Cliff Clavin?"
- Laura Walton (Gail O'Grady), a woman repulsed by Sam's demeanor and who agrees to date Sam only because the millionaire Robin Colcord would also appear at an event. Laura eventually ditches Sam just before Robin arrives late to pick Sam and Rebecca up. — "Finally! Part 1"
- Ingrid (Crystal Carson), a woman with whom Robin is cheating on Rebecca — "Finally! Part 1"
- Bill Medley (himself), a singer of The Righteous Brothers, sent by Robin to sing Rebecca favorite song, "You've Lost That Lovin' Feelin'" — two parts of "Finally!"
- Elaine (Carol Robbins), a harpist sent by Robin to perform Rebecca favorite song, "You've Lost That Lovin' Feelin'" — "Finally! Part 2"
- Christine Devi (Valerie Karasek), a New York City Ballet dancer who had dated Robin until she meets his another love interest Rebecca, prompting Christine to end the relationship with him — "Finally! Part 2"
- Roxanne Gaines (Melendy Britt), Walter Gaines's ex-wife and Kelly Gaines's mother, trying to seduce Woody and having flirted with Kelly's previous boyfriends — "Woody or Won't He"
- Conrad Langston (Bill Geisslinger), one of stockbrokers of "The Hard Luck Five", who sell shares of troubled companies and anticipate stocks to become worthless — "Woody or Won't He"
- Brenda Balzak (Phyllis Katz), a host of her talk show Brenda Talks — "Severe Crane Damage"
- Viper (Lorelle Brina), also called Ellen, a motorcyclist whom Frasier briefly dates while trying to be a "bad boy", like Sam — "Severe Crane Damage"
- Chambermaid (Trish Ramish), a chambermaid of the Gaines manor, also one of Sam's casual interests — "Loverboyd"
- Dennis (Michael Rupert), a talk show host of Consumer Patrol, covering matters that concern customers, like defective products. According to Norm, Dennis replaces a previous host who was fatally shot by his wife for sleeping with his secretary. — "The Ghost and Mrs. LeBec"
- Terry (Christine Cavanaugh) and Cutter Gardner (Eric Bruskotter) — a married couple from Indiana, Woody's home state. Terry temporarily becomes Woody's roommate until she decides to go back to her husband Cutter, who under jealous rage chases after Cliff, whom Woody purportedly misidentifies to avoid confrontation with Cutter. — "Mr. Otis Regrets"
- Jim Montgomery (Jonathan McMurtry), one of the executives of the Lillian Corporation, who awards Sam back the bar as a reward for turning Robin in — "Cry Hard" and "Cry Harder"
- Agent Munson (Ron Canada), an FBI agent searching for Robin, who escaped bail and then fled the United States — "Cry Harder"

=== Season 9 ===
- Earl (Bryan Clark), temporary bar manager and all-round nice guy who is beloved by all and briefly replaces Rebecca before Sam hires her back — "Rebecca Redux" (1990)

== Notes ==
=== References ===
- Bjorklund, Dennis A (September 2014). Cheers TV Show: A Comprehensive Reference (e-Book ed.). Praetorian Publishing. ISBN 9780967985237.
- Jones, Gerald. Honey, I'm Home! Sitcoms: Selling the American Dream. New York: Grove Weidenfeld—Grove Press, 1992. Print. ISBN 978-0-8021-1308-5.
- Wendt, George. Drinking with George. New York: Simon Spotlight Entertainment, 2009. Print. ISBN 978-1-4391-4958-4.
