= Mining in the United States =

Mining in the United States has been active since the beginning of colonial times, but became a major industry in the 19th century with a number of new mineral discoveries causing a series of mining rushes. In 2015, the value of coal, metals, and industrial minerals mined in the United States was US$109.6 billion. 158,000 workers were directly employed by the mining industry.

The mining industry has a number of impacts on communities, individuals and the environment. Mine safety incidents have been important parts of American occupational safety and health history. Mining has a number of environmental impacts. In the United States, issues like mountaintop removal, and acid mine drainage have widespread impacts on all parts of the environment. As of January 2020, the EPA lists 142 mines in the Superfund program.

In 2019, the country was the 4th world producer of gold; 5th largest world producer of copper; 5th worldwide producer of platinum; 10th worldwide producer of silver; 2nd largest world producer of rhenium; 2nd largest world producer of sulfur; 3rd largest world producer of phosphate; 3rd largest world producer of molybdenum; 4th largest world producer of lead; 4th largest world producer of zinc; 5th worldwide producer of vanadium; 9th largest world producer of iron ore; 9th largest world producer of potash; 12th largest world producer of cobalt; 13th largest world producer of titanium; world's largest producer of gypsum; 2nd largest world producer of kyanite; 2nd largest world producer of limestone; in addition to being the 2nd largest world producer of salt. It was the world's 10th largest producer of uranium in 2018.

== History ==
The extraction of minerals from the Earth dates back to the Ancient Egyptians' mining of copper in 3000 BCE. Mining for ancient civilizations was often extremely dangerous involving the use of stone tools or hands for excavation. By the Middle Ages, stone tools were replaced by explosives, black powder, to break-up larger rock formations. Colonists in the United States found iron ore at the Jamestown settlement which resulted in a mining operation beginning in 1620; however, the operation was cut short due to the presence of Native Americans at the site. Despite several small mining endeavors beginning in the 17th and 18th centuries, mining did not gain major traction in the United States until the 19th century. In terms of technology, explosives such as black powder were phased out as dynamite increased in popularity as a new mining method in the 19th century. The California Gold Rush began in 1848 after the discovery of gold at Sutter's Mill in 1848. By the year 1849, over 80,000 people had relocated to California in search of gold. Eventually, the Gold Rush peaked in 1852 and concluded by the early 1900s. During the rush Chilean miners introduced technology such as the Chilean mill and the batea gold pan to the United States. Many Euramericans learned skills of the mining trade from the usually more experienced Chileans.

See also:

- Carolina Gold Rush, Cabarrus County, North Carolina, US (1799)
- Georgia Gold Rush, Georgia, US (1828)
- California Gold Rush, California (1848–1855)
- Pikes Peak Gold Rush, Pikes Peak, Colorado (1859)
- Holcomb Valley Gold Rush, California (1860)
- Black Hills Gold Rush, Black Hills of South Dakota and Wyoming (1874–1878)
- Mount Baker Gold Rush, Whatcom County, Washington, United States (1897–1920s)
- Nome Gold Rush, Nome, Alaska (1899–1909)
- Fairbanks Gold Rush, Fairbanks, Alaska (1902–1905)

== Mining by commodity ==
Top commodities mined in the US, 2019
Rank	Commodity	Value, US$ billion
1	Coal	25.1
2	Crushed rock	18.7
3	Cement	12.5
4	Gold	9.0
5	Construction sand and gravel	9.0
6	Copper	7.9
7	Industrial sand and gravel	5.7
8	Iron ore	5.4
Source: US Geological Survey, Mineral Commodities Summaries, 2020.

== Mining by mineral ==
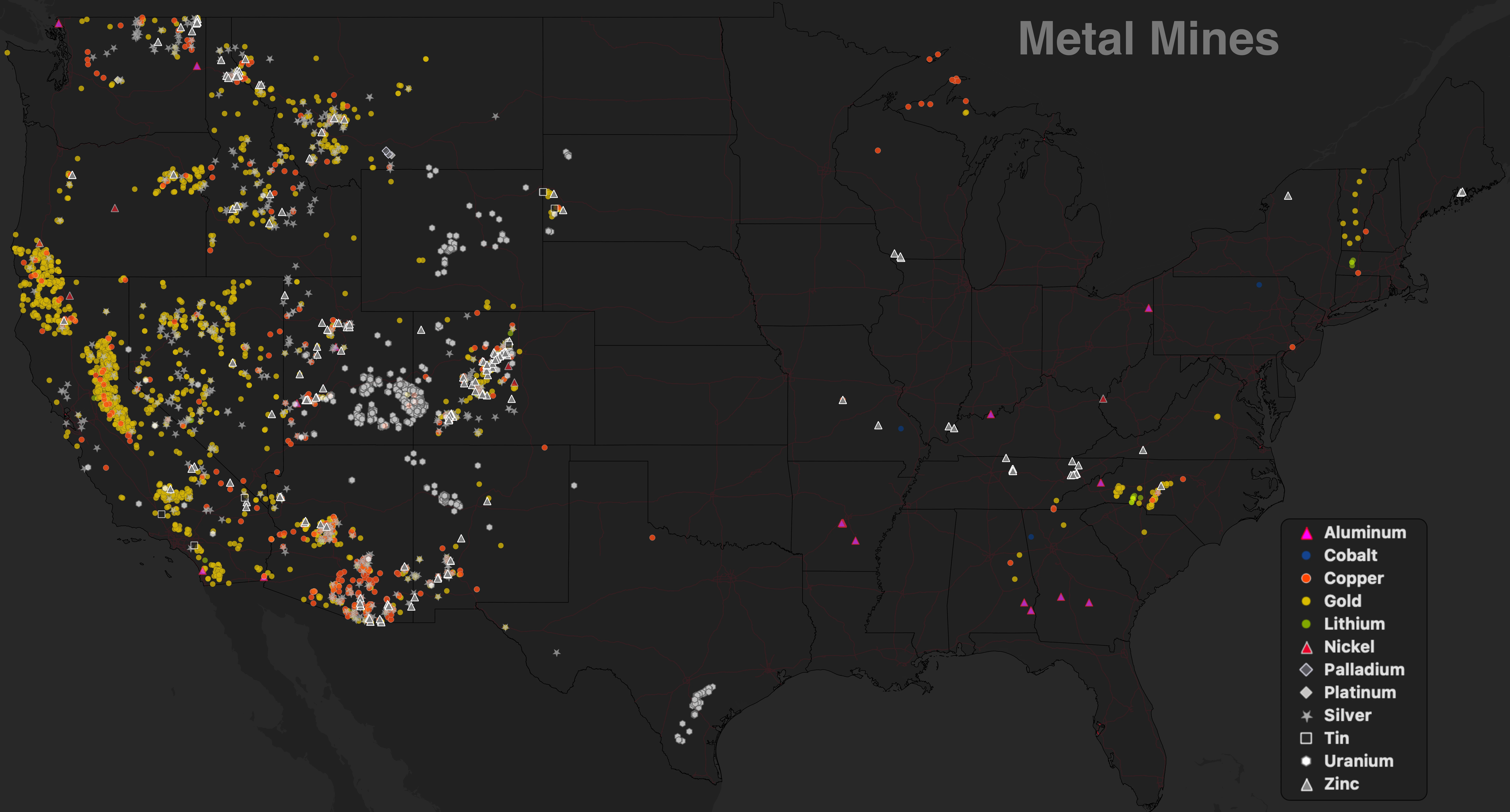
Metal mines in the United States

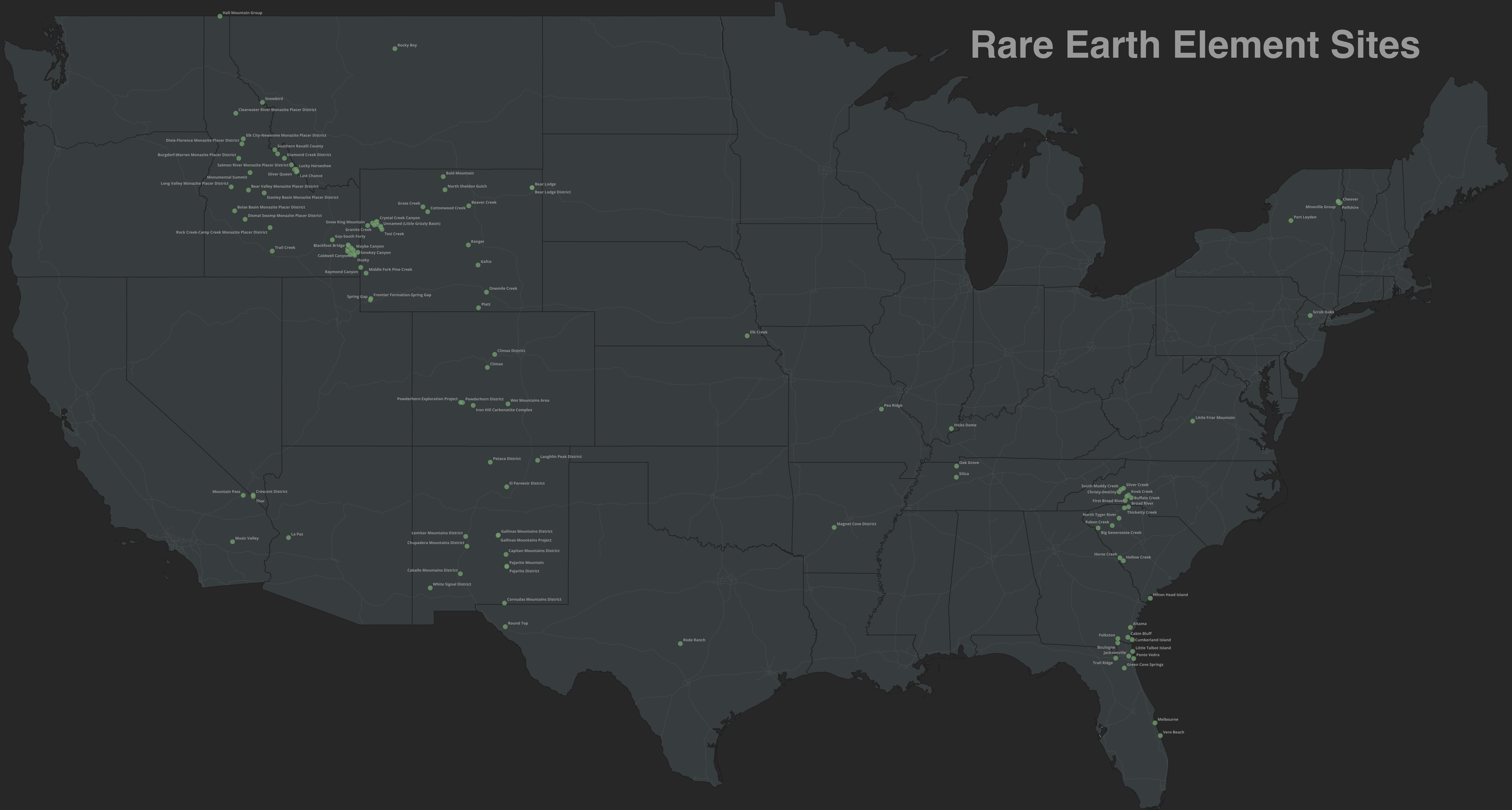
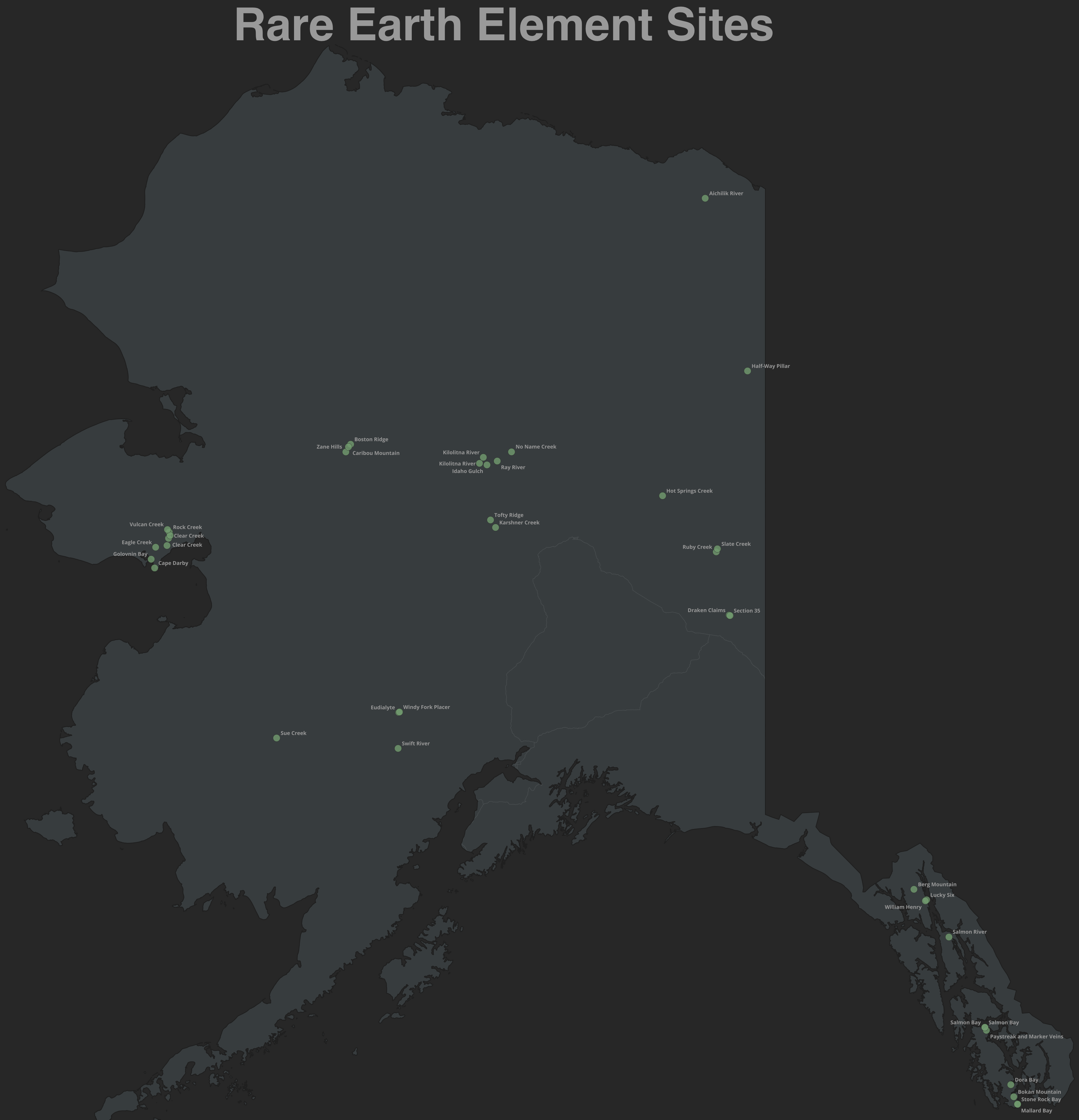
Rare-earth element deposit sites in the United States
- Bauxite mining in the United States
- Coal mining in the United States
- Copper mining in the United States
- Gold mining in the United States
- Iron mining in the United States
- Molybdenum mining in the United States
- Phosphate mining in the United States
- Silver mining in the United States
- Uranium mining in the United States
- Zinc mining in the United States

== Mining by state ==
- Category:Mining in Alaska
- Category:Mining in Arizona
- Category:Mining in California
- Category:Mining in Colorado
- Category:Mining in Michigan
- Category:Mining in Minnesota
- Category:Mining in Nevada
- Category:Mining in Pennsylvania
- Category:Mining in Utah
- Category:Mining in West Virginia

== Mining accidents ==
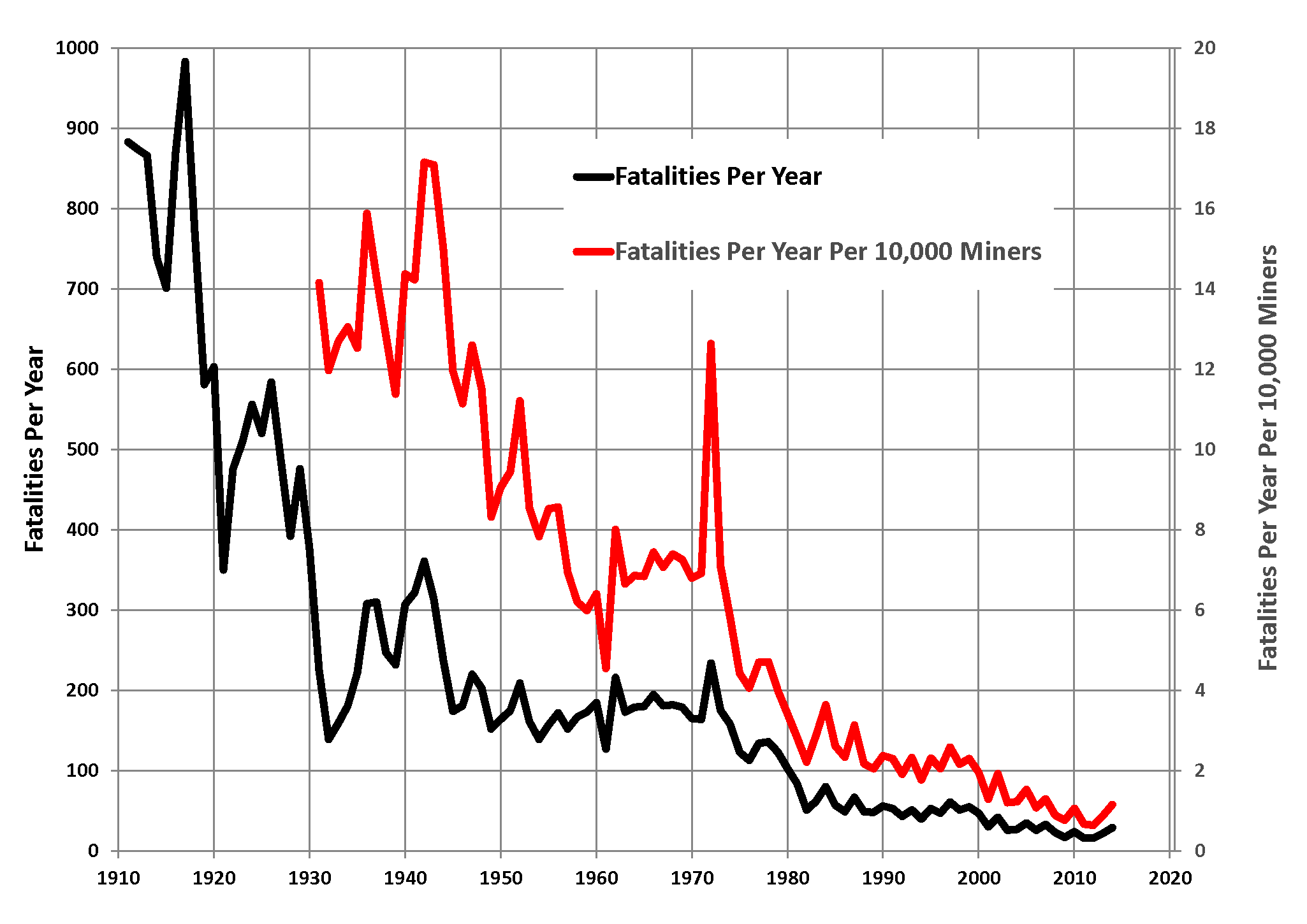
Non-coal mining fatalities in the United States, 1911–2014 (data from US Department of Labor)

From 1880 to 1910, mine accidents claimed thousands of fatalities, with more than 3,000 in 1907 alone. Where annual mining deaths had numbered more than 1,000 a year during the early part of the 20th century, they decreased to an average of about 500 during the late 1950s, and to 93 during the 1990s. In addition to deaths, many thousands more are injured (an average of 21,351 injuries per year between 1991 and 1999), but overall there has been a downward trend of deaths and injuries.

The Monongah Mining Disaster was the worst mining accident of American history; 362 workers were killed in an underground explosion on December 6, 1907, in Monongah, West Virginia. The U.S. Bureau of Mines was created in 1910 to investigate accidents, advise industry, conduct production and safety research, and teach courses in accident prevention, first aid, and mine rescue. The Federal Coal Mine Health and Safety Acts of 1969 and 1977 set further safety standards for the industry.

In 1959, the Knox Mine Disaster occurred in Port Griffith, Pennsylvania. The swelling Susquehanna river collapsed into a mine under it and resulted in 12 deaths. In Plymouth, Pennsylvania, the Avondale Mine Disaster resulted in the deaths of 108 miners and two rescue workers after a fire in the only shaft eliminated the oxygen in the mine. Federal laws for mining safety ensued this disaster. Pennsylvania suffered another disaster in 2002 at Quecreek, 9 miners were trapped underground and subsequently rescued after 78 hours. During 2006, 72 miners lost their lives at work, 47 by coal mining. The majority of these fatalities occurred in Kentucky and West Virginia, including the Sago Mine Disaster. On April 5, 2010, in the Upper Big Branch Mine disaster an underground explosion caused the deaths of 29 miners.

== Environmental impact ==
Mining has environmental impacts at many stages in the process and production of mining. In the United States, many different regions in the United States have environmental challenges caused by either historical or current mining.

=== Mountain top removal ===
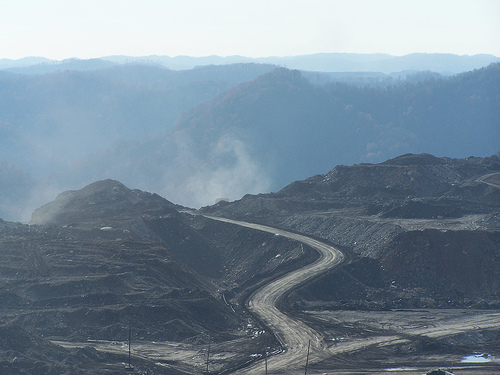
Mountaintop removal site

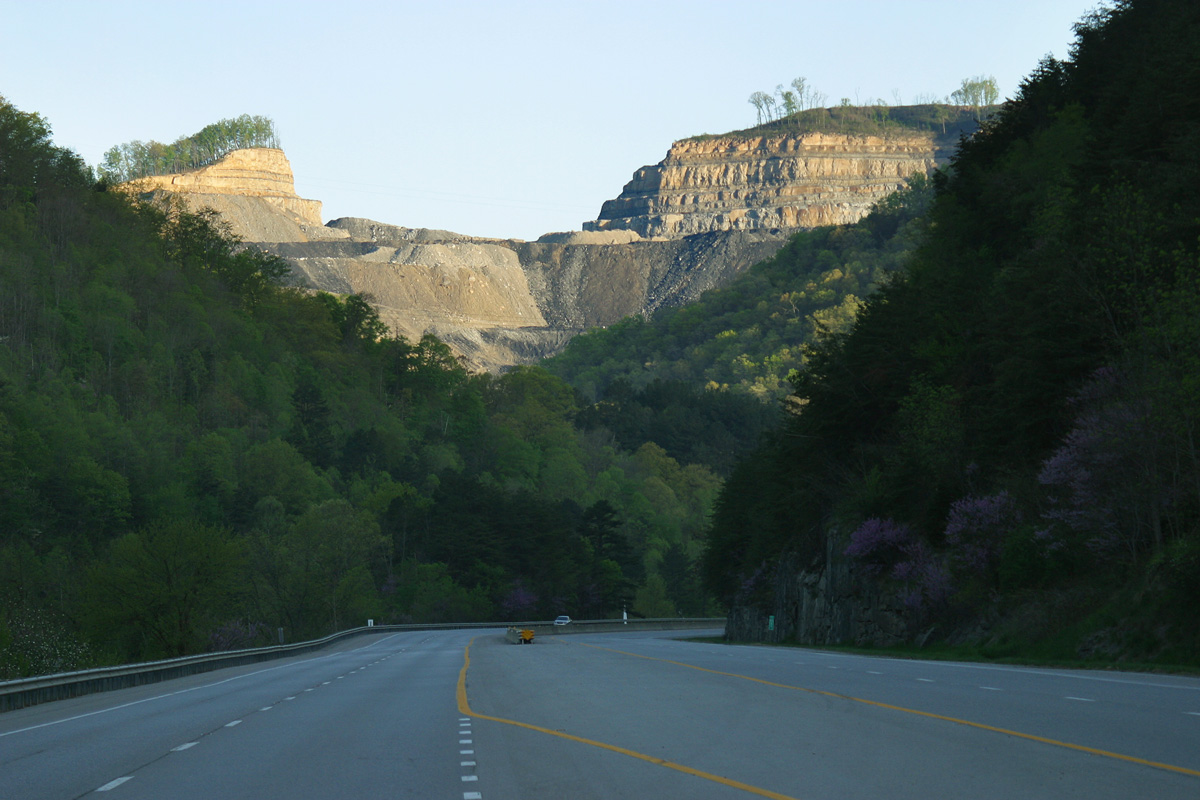
Mountaintop removal site in Pike County, Kentucky

Mountaintop removal mining (MTR), also known as mountaintop mining (MTM), is a form of surface mining at the summit or summit ridge of a mountain. Coal seams are extracted from a mountain by removing the land, or overburden, above the seams. This process is considered to be safer compared to underground mining because the coal seams are accessed from above instead of underground. In the United States, this method of coal mining is conducted in the Appalachian Mountains in the eastern United States. Explosives are used to remove up to 400 vertical feet (120 m) of mountain to expose underlying coal seams. Excess rock and soil is dumped into nearby valleys, in what are called "holler fills" ("hollow fills") or "valley fills".

=== Abandoned mines ===
There are tens of thousands of abandoned mines in the United States. Many abandoned mines pose environmental challenges, such as acid mine drainage. In Colorado alone, there are 18,382 abandoned mines. The United States has had many different environmental disasters caused by these mines, such as the 2015 Gold King Mine waste water spill. Many Superfund sites are mines. As of January 2020. the EPA lists 142 mines in the Superfund program

=== Water pollution ===
Fresh water is used in the mining process for the extraction of minerals like coal and the processing of ore. After the water has cycled through the mining process, it is discharged as effluent. The effluent or drainage is acidic due to the presence of sulfuric acid. Acid-rich water drainage can lead to environmental implications including contaminated drinking water and disruption of aquatic environments near the mining site. In addition to the detrimental effects caused by mining drainage, the mining process is responsible for depleting groundwater supplies. The Santa Cruz River basin is being dried to support a copper mine in Arizona.

=== Land degradation ===
44% of mining facilities in the United States are located in forests. Large-scale mining in areas of Latin America, like Brazil, release pollutants detrimental to neighboring rainforests. Copper mining efforts in the Carajas Mineral Province in Brazil result in 6,100 km of deforestation every year. Mining also results in a loss of biodiversity. Deforestation as well as the release of toxic chemicals to both the air and water can affect neighboring plant and animal life. 40% of all global mines are located in areas of increased biodiversity that have experienced decline in species population due to surrounding industry. Chemicals used in the mining process also result in soil erosion that strips the land of essential nutrients affecting surrounding plant and animal life.

== Controversies ==
Mines are often controversial in their local areas, with local residents split by those in favor particularly due to the economic impact of new jobs and those concerned by the environmental impact and occupational hazards. In the case of the proposed Crandon mine, the U.S. Supreme Court found that tribes have the right to regulate water and air, which destroyed the economic feasibility of the project.

== See also ==
- List of mines in the United States
- Mine Safety and Health Administration
- United States Bureau of Mines
- Coal Wars
- Mine Owners' Association
- National Mining Hall of Fame
- Environmental issues with mining
- North Bloomfield Mining and Gravel Company, a prosecution in 1884 led to the Sawyer Decision, among the first environmental decisions in the United States
- Mountaintop removal#Legislation in the United States
