= Centerra Gold =

Canadian mining company

Centerra Gold Inc.
- Type: Public
- Traded as: TSX: CG; NYSE: CGAU
- Industry: Mining
- Founded: November 7, 2002
- Headquarters: Toronto, Ontario, Canada
- Key people: Leonard Homeniuk (CEO, 2002-08); Stephen Lang (CEO, 2008-12); Scott Perry (CEO, 2015-2022) Paul Tomory (CEO, 2023-Present)
- Products: Gold, copper, molybdenum
- Revenue: US$1.3 billion (2019)
- Subsidiaries: Centerra Gold Services (Canada), Thompson Creek Metals Company (Canada), Centerra Luxembourg Holdings, Centerra Exploration B.V. (Netherlands), Öksüt Madencilik Sanayi (Turkey), AuRico Metals (Canada)
- Website: www.centerragold.com

Centerra Gold Inc. is a Canadian mining company that owns and operates the Mount Milligan copper-gold mine in British Columbia, Canada, and the Öksüt gold mine in Turkey. Through its Thompson Creek Metals subsidiary company, it also owns the Endako and Thompson Creek molybdenum mines in British Columbia and Idaho, respectively, though they have been inactive since Centerra's acquisition. The company formerly owned and operated the Kumtor Gold Mine in the Kyrgyz Republic and the Boroo Gold Mine in Mongolia. Headquartered in Toronto, Centerra Gold is a public company with shares traded on the Toronto Stock Exchange and New York Stock Exchange.

== History ==
Centerra Gold is the result of a corporate spin-off the Cameco Corporation's gold mining interests. In 2002 the Canadian uranium mining company Cameco created the Kumtor Mountain Holdings Corporation as a subsidiary which, in December 2003, would be re-named Centerra Gold. As part of a new restructuring and investment agreement the Government of the Kyrgyz Republic, effective June 2004, under which tax and legal rules governing the Kumtor project were finalized, both Cameco (66%) and Kyrgyz Republic-owned Kyrgyzaltyn JSC (33%) transferred their interests in the Kumtor mine to Centerra, with outstanding debts owed to the International Finance Corporation and the European Bank for Reconstruction and Development exchanged for a 4% interest in the new company. Their initial public offering (IPO) sold 27.3% of the company, raising $253 million at $15.50 per share, leaving Cameco and Kyrgyzaltyn owning 52.7% and 15.7%. Concurrent with the IPO, Centerra acquired 100% ownership of the Boroo gold mine in Mongolia through its acquisition of Australian company AGR Limited. The company's stock prices peak at $46 in 2006 before they were split with each shareholder receiving an additional two shares.

In addition to its principal asset, the Kumtor mine, owned and operated through its Kyrgyz subsidiaries Kumtor Gold Company and Kumtor Operating Company, Centerra also owned and operated Boroo Gold Mine in Mongolia through its AGR Limited subsidiary. Both countries were relatively new to foreign direct investment, with Kumtor making up 4% of the Kyrgyz Republic's gross domestic product in 2007 and Boroo accounting for almost 10% of Mongolia's GDP in 2004, and consequently subject to an evolving legal environment. While Centerra had negotiated legally-binding investment agreements for both projects to provide a regulatory framework and certainty in financial obligations, conflicts did continue to arise to which the company had to respond. Kumtor was subject to nationalization debates and the agreement was reviewed after both the 2005 and 2010 revolutions, while Mongolia adopted new mining tax and environmental protection laws that threatened the viability of Boroo and Centerra's developing Gatsuurt property. Both mines were also subject to work stoppages and interruptions, including wall failures at the Kumtor mine in 2006 and 2012, strikes and blockades and a failed mining inspection at Boroo. Boroo reached its end of mine life in September 2012 though milling of excavated material continued for another two years before entering care and maintenance in 2015. Centerra sold all its Mongolian holdings (the Boroo facility and the Gatsuurt project), in 2018, to Singaporean investment company OZD ASIA PTE Ltd for $35 million.

In 2016, seeking to lower its risk profile, Centerra acquired Thompson Creek Metals, a deeply-indebted American molybdenum mining company that was listed on the Toronto Stock Exchange (and previously on the New York Stock Exchange prior to the collapse of its share price). The deal was opposed by the Kyrgyz directors of Centerra but avoided a shareholder vote (at the time Kyrgyzaltyn owned 32% of Centerra); the US$1.1 billion deal involved immediately paying the debt that was coming due that year, inheriting the remainder of the debt and giving Thompson Creek shareholders an 8% interest in Centerra (which diluted Kyrgyzaltyn interest to 27%). Through the Thompson Creek Metals subsidiary, Centerra now owned and operated the Mount Milligan gold-copper mine and Endako molybdenum mine in British Columbia, Canada, and the Thompson Creek molybdenum mine in Idaho and the Langeloth metallurgical plant in Pennsylvania. Meanwhile, of Centerra's exploration properties, the Öksüt project in Turkey was proving to be economical and technically feasible. The company had acquired complete ownership in 2012 and made the investment decision to construct the mine in 2018. In 2015, former AuRico Gold CEO Scott Perry was appointed CEO of Centerra Gold, which acquired AuRico Gold spin off, and TSX-listed, AuRico Metals for $310 million in cash in 2018, giving Centerra ownership of two net smelter returns and the Kemess Mine facility which had been closed since 2011 but was undergoing feasibility studies to access a new deposit.

Political instability in Kyrgyzstan following the October 2020 elections and the ensuing protests, referendum to switch from a parliamentary system of government to a presidential system, and then the election of nationalist Sadyr Japarov as president, led to a law being adopted that allowed Kyrgyzstan to temporarily operate the Kumtor Gold Mine for 3 months for the purposes of rectifying alleged dangers to people and the natural environment. At the same time, a Kyrgyz court fined the company US$3 billion for violations of environmental laws. Centerra had the Kumtor Gold Company subsidiaries declared bankruptcy and filed for arbitration with the United Nations Commission on International Trade Law. Former Prime Minister Ömürbek Babanov and other officials came under investigation of financial crimes related to Kumtor and Centerra sued its former board member Tengiz Bolturuk alleging that he assisted the expropriation. In April 2022, Centerra Gold and the Kyrgyz government reached an agreement that had Centerra completely exiting from Kyrgyzstan, with the Government of Kyrgyzstan taking full ownership of the company's Kyrgyz subsidiaries.

== Operations ==
As of 2020, Centerra Gold operates two gold mines: the Öksüt gold mine in Turkey and the Mount Milligan gold/copper mine in Canada. Through its Thompson Creek Metals subsidiary, Centerra also owns the Thompson Creek molybdenum mine and operates the Langeloth metallurgical plant in the United States, and owns the Endako molybdenum mine in Canada.

The Öksüt gold mine is located in the Kayseri Province of Turkey. It is an open pit mine with ore that is processed using heap leaching and electrowinning to produce doré bars. Centerra has an interest in the project since 2009 and acquired full ownership in 2012 as an exploration property. Following favourable economic and technical feasibility studies began construction in 2018 with production commencing in 2020 with an expected 8 year mine life. It is operated by the subsidiary company Öksüt Madencilik through Centerra Luxembourg Holdings SARL.

The Mount Milligan copper-gold mine is located in northern British Columbia, Canada, between Fort St. James and Mackenzie. Thompson Creek Metals had brought it into commercial production in 2014, with Centerra Gold gaining control effective October 2016 with their acquisition of Thompson Creek Metals. It is an open-pit mine where the ore is only processed to be ore concentrate which is shipped overseas, via Vancouver. The mine produces approximately the equivalent (contained in the concentrate) of 180,000 ounces of gold each year and 60 million pounds of copper.

With its 2016 acquisition of Thompson Creek Metals, Centerra also gained ownership and control over the dormant Endako and Thompson Creek molybdenum mines and the Langeloth Metallurgical Facility. The Endako mine is located in northern British Columbia, Canada, near Fraser Lake, and is operated as a joint venture with the Japanese company Sojitz Corporation which has a 25% interest. The Thompson Creek mine, located near Challis, Idaho, and partly within the Salmon–Challis National Forest. Both the Endako and Thompson Creek mines, before they entered care and maintenance in 2014-15 due to low molybdenum commodity prices making the mines uneconomical, had supplied Thompson Creek Metals' Langeloth Metallurgical Facility in Langeloth, Pennsylvania. However since Centerra Gold took ownership it has only processed molybdenum concentrate from third parties.

=== Past operations ===
The Kumtor gold mine, located in the Jeti-Ögüz District of the Issyk-Kul Region in the Kyrgyz Republic, opened in 1997 with ownership transferred to Centerra in 2002. At over 4,000 metres (13,000 ft) above sea level, it is a high-altitude mine, among the Lysyi and Davidov glaciers in the Tian Shan mountains. It is a conventional open-pit mine with an on-site mill where doré bars are produced from ore that is ground, dissolved into a pyrite flotation, sent through a carbon in leach system and collected by electrowinning. The mine has produced approximately 500,000 ounces of gold per year, except for 2012 due to a pit wall collapse (from excessive amounts of ice following winter storms) which closed operations for half the year. In addition to the numerous accidents that occurred prior to Centerra, the mine has been the subject to numerous controversies, including health and safety concerns, impacts on the natural environment from excavating glacial material and disposal of waste, and political debate due to its prominence in the Kyrgyz Republic. Centerra exited Kyrgyzstan in 2022 after the Government of Kyrgyzstan nationalized the mine.

The Boroo Gold Mine located in Selenge Province of Mongolia, was owned and operated by Centerra Gold between the company's 2004 acquisition of AGR Limited and the 2015 sale of its Mongolian assets to OZD ASIA PTE Ltd. Prior to 2004 Centerra, through parent company Cameco, held partial interest in the Boroo project and jointly conducted exploration and development work with AGR. The mine had reached commercial production in February 2004 and produced approximately 50,000 to 90,000 ounces of gold ore per year until extraction activities ended in 2014, though processing of remaining material continued into 2015.
