= Molybdenum mining in the United States =

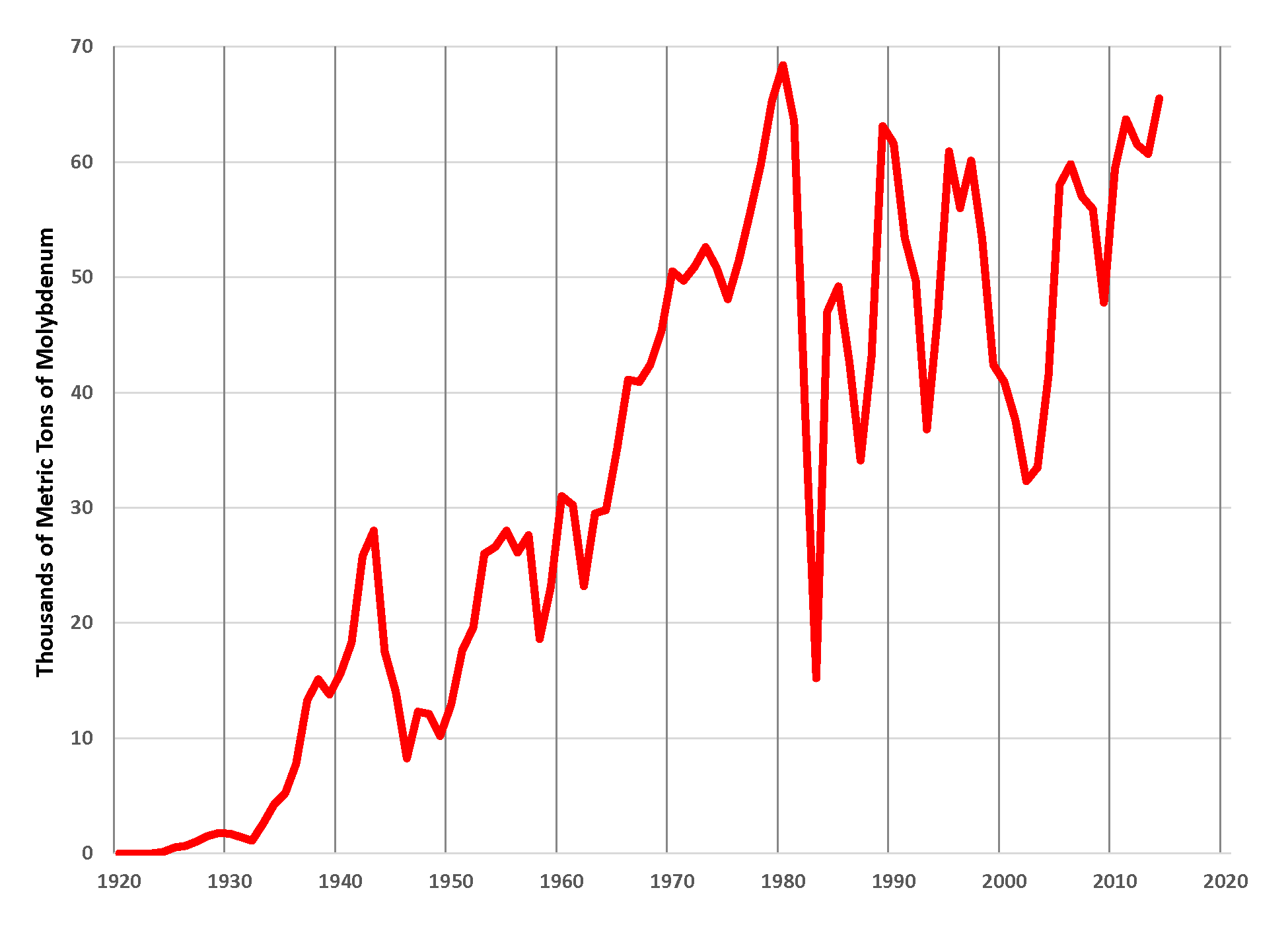
United States primary molybdenum production, 1920–2014 (date from USGS)

Molybdenum mines

Molybdenum mining in the United States produced 65,500 metric tons of molybdenum in 2014, worth US$1.8 billion. The US was the world's second-largest molybdenum producer, after China, and provided 25% of the world's supply of molybdenum.

The US was a major exporter of molybdenum; net exports made up 48% of US production. Because most molybdenum is used as a steel alloy, demand for, and therefore the price of, molybdenum, tracks the demand for steel.

As of the end of 2014, the United States had 2.7 million tons of molybdenum reserves, and 5.4 million tons of identified molybdenum resource.

== Molybdenum mines ==
Molybdenum is produced in the US from porphyry deposits of two types. The first class, which produces molybdenum as the primary product, includes molybdenum porphyry deposits. In 2014, three such molybdenum porphyry deposits were mined: two in Colorado and one in Idaho; the mine in Idaho was put into inactive status at the end of 2014. The second class, which produces molybdenum as a byproduct of copper mining, includes copper porphyry deposits. In 2014, byproduct molybdenum was produced at ten porphyry copper mines, in Arizona, Montana, Nevada, and New Mexico. Byproduct molybdenum from copper mines accounted for 47% of US molybdenum production in 2013.

In both molybdenum porphyries and copper porphyries, the molybdenum is present as molybdenite.

=== Climax mine, Colorado ===
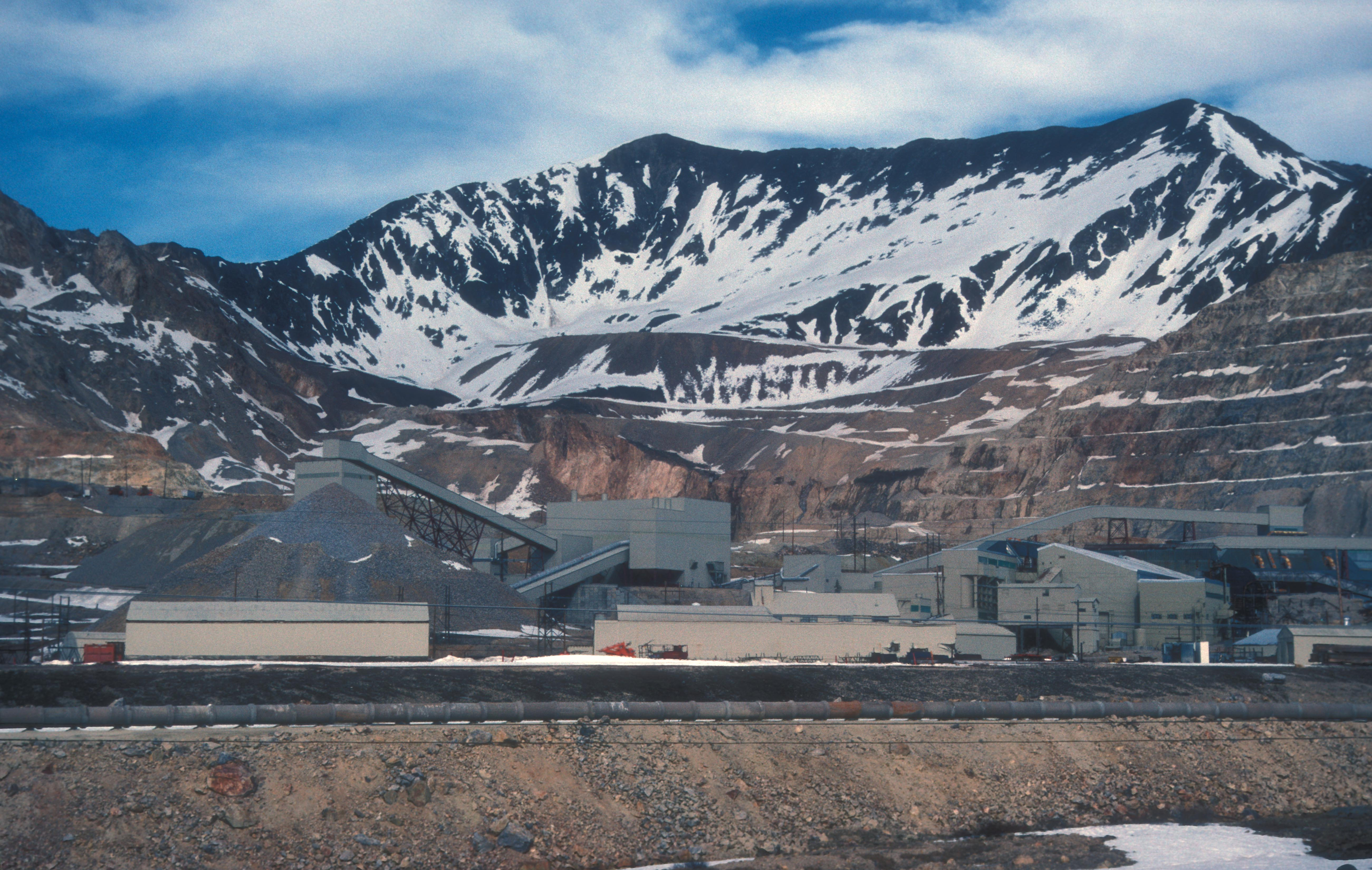
Climax Mine, 2007

The Climax mine, historically the world's largest source of molybdenum, is north of Leadville, Colorado. Climax first produced molybdenum in 1915, and was worked continuously from 1924 until it was shut down in 1995. Formerly an underground mine, the Climax mine reopened as a surface mine in 2012. It is owned by the Climax Molybdenum Company and now operates as an open pit.

=== Henderson mine, Colorado ===
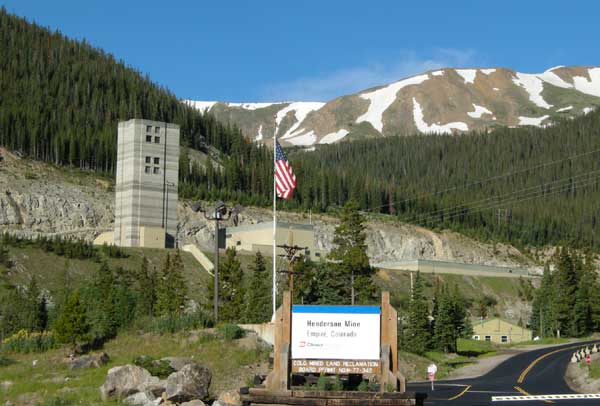
The Henderson molybdenum mine is just east of the snow-capped continental divide, which appears in the background (photo taken in mid-July, 2009)

The Henderson molybdenum mine, near Empire, Colorado, started producing molybdenum in 1976, and was the nation's leading molybdenum producer in 2013, with 13,600 metric tons of molybdenum. The mine is owned by Climax Molybdenum Company.

=== Thompson Creek mine, Idaho ===
The Thompson Creek mine, in Custer County, Idaho, is owned by the Thompson Creek Metals Co., Inc. The mine was a large producer in 2014, but was put on inactive status in December 2014.

=== Byproduct of copper mining ===
As of 2014, there were ten US copper mines producing molybdenum as a byproduct. The number of mines producing byproduct molybdenum at any given time depends on the price of molybdenum and the amount of molybdenite in the ore.

Both copper sulfides and molybdenite are separated from the gangue by froth flotation. To separate the molybdenite from the copper sulfides, the copper/molybdenum concentrate is run through a molybdenite recovery flotation circuit, in which chemicals are added to "depress" the copper, meaning to prevent the copper sulfide minerals from attaching to the froth, while the molybdenum is unaffected. A few plants do the opposite, adding other chemicals to depress the molybdenum while the copper floats.

- Bagdad mine, Yavapai County, Arizona, Freeport-McMoRan, recovered 3,630 tons of molybdenum in 2013.
- Bingham Canyon mine, Salt Lake County, Utah, owned Rio Tinto, mined 5,700 tons of molybdenum in 2013.
- Chino mine, Grant County, New Mexico, owned by Freeport-McMoRan, mined 910 tons of molybdenum in 2013.
- Continental mine, Silver Bow County, Montana, owned by Montana Resources LLP.
- Mineral Park mine, Mohave County, Arizona, owned by Waterton Global Resource Management.
- Mission mine, Sahuarita, Arizona, owned by Grupo México.
- Morenci mine, Greenlee County, Arizona, owned by Freeport-McMoRan, produced 910 tons of molybdenum in 2013.
- Pinto Valley mine, Gila County, Arizona, Capstone Mining Corp.
- Robinson mine, White Pine County, Nevada, KGHM Polska Miedź.
- Sierrita mine, Pima County, Arizona, owned by Freeport-McMoRan, recovered 9,070 tons of molybdenum in 2013.

== Inactive ore deposits ==
There are a number of undeveloped and currently inactive molybdenum deposits in the United States.

Inactive mines

- Ashdown mine, Humboldt County, Nevada, owned by Win-Eldrich Mines.
- Questa mine, Taos County, New Mexico, owned by Chevron Mining.

Deposits not yet mined

- Mt. Hope, Nevada
- Lucky Jack mine (Mt. Emmons deposit), Gunnison County, Colorado, owned by U.S. Energy Corporation, planning and permitting.
- Rico deposit, Dolores County, Colorado, has an identified resource of 124,000 tons of molybdenum.

== History ==
The United States dominated molybdenum production for most of the 20th century, producing more than half the world's production each year from 1925 through 1981. In 1953, US mines supplied 92 percent of world molybdenum production. The US was the world's leading molybdenum producer from 1924 through 2006, after which US production was overtaken by China.

== See also ==
- List of molybdenum mines
