= Parshall, Colorado =

Census-designated place in Grand County, CO, USA

- Census-designated place
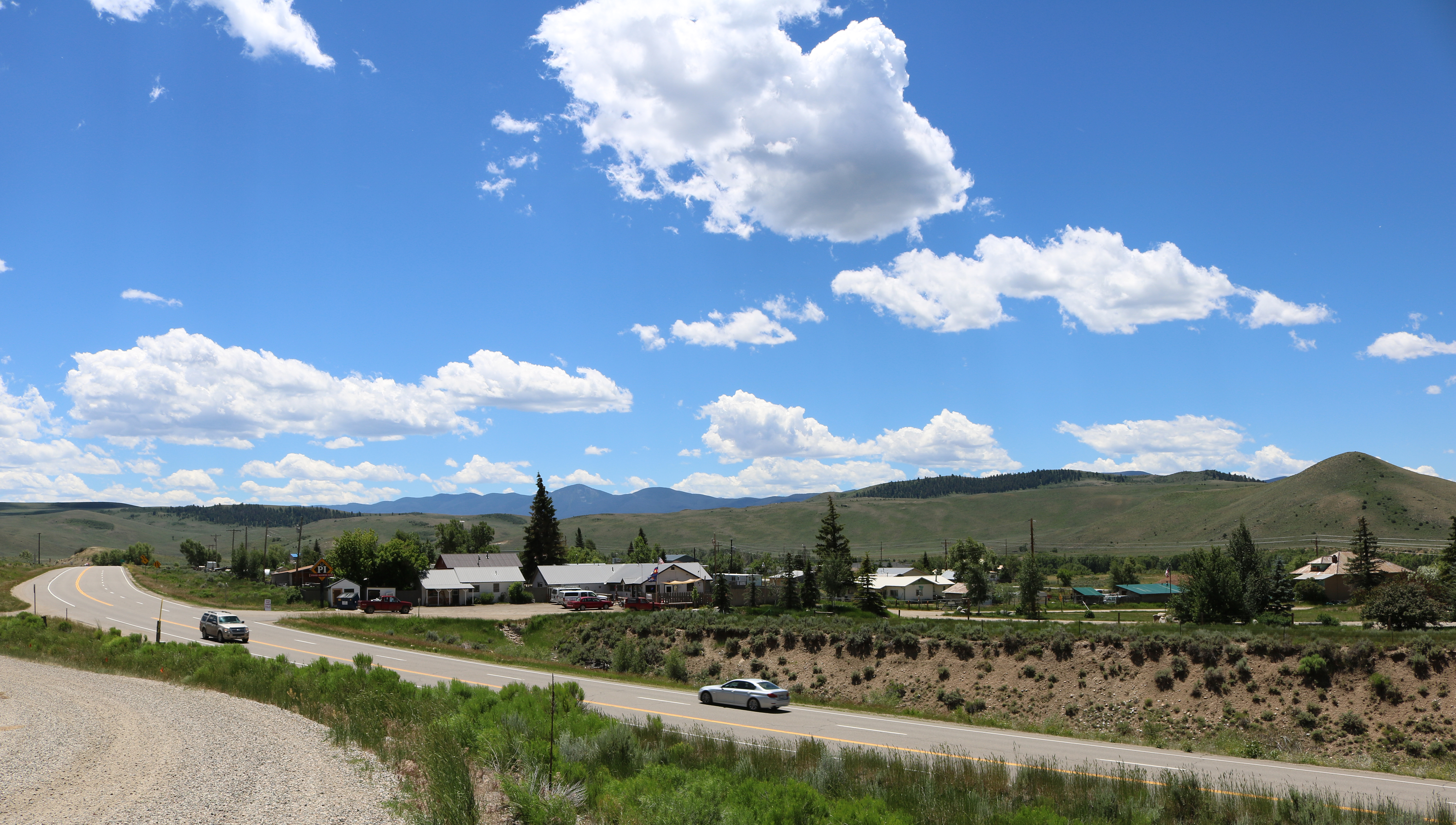
- A view of Parshall from across U.S. Highway 40.

- Location of the Parshall CDP in Grand County, Colorado
- Coordinates: 40°03′20″N 106°10′34″W
- Country: United States
- State: Colorado
- County: Grand County

Government
  - Type: unincorporated town

Area
  - Total: 0.299 sq mi (0.774 km^{2})
  - Land: 0.299 sq mi (0.774 km^{2})
  - Water: 0 sq mi (0.000 km^{2})
- Elevation: 7,586 ft (2,312 m)

Population (2020)
  - Total: 42
  - Density: 140/sq mi (54/km^{2})
- Time zone: UTC-7 (MST)
  - Summer (DST): UTC-6 (MDT)
- ZIP Code: 80468
- Area code: 970
- GNIS feature: 2583276

Parshall is an unincorporated town, a post office, and a census-designated place (CDP) located in and governed by Grand County, Colorado, United States. The Parshall post office has the ZIP Code 80468. At the United States Census 2020, the population of the Parshall CDP was 42.

== Demographics ==
The United States Census Bureau initially defined the Parshall CDP for the United States Census 2010.

Parshall CDP, Colorado
Year	Pop.	±%
2010	47	—
2020	42	−10.6%
Source: United States Census Bureau

== Commerce and industry ==
The Henderson Mill on County Road 3 is the most significant local industry. It processes molybdenum ore derived from the Henderson Mine in Clear Creek County, just over the Continental Divide. There are tourist facilities, such as the Bar Lazy J Guest Ranch (founded 1912), Colorado Cannabis School, the Aspen Canyon Ranch, and fishing areas along the Colorado River and the Williams Fork and Reservoir. Cattle ranching occupies much of the lower areas.

== Geography ==
Parshall is located along the south side of U.S. Route 40 between Hot Sulphur Springs and Kremmling, on the north bank of the Colorado River downstream from Byers Canyon.

The Parshall CDP has an area of 191 acres (0.774 km^{2}), all land.

=== Climate ===
This climate type is dominated by the winter season, a long, bitterly cold period with short, clear days, relatively little precipitation mostly in the form of snow, and low humidity. According to the Köppen Climate Classification system, Parshall has a subarctic climate, abbreviated "Dfc" on climate maps.

Climate data for Williams Fork Dam, Colorado, 1991–2020 normals, extremes 1982–present
Month	Jan	Feb	Mar	Apr	May	Jun	Jul	Aug	Sep	Oct	Nov	Dec	Year
Record high °F (°C)	53 (12)	56 (13)	67 (19)	76 (24)	84 (29)	90 (32)	92 (33)	90 (32)	88 (31)	79 (26)	65 (18)	59 (15)	92 (33)
Mean maximum °F (°C)	43.8 (6.6)	47.1 (8.4)	57.7 (14.3)	68.0 (20.0)	76.7 (24.8)	83.7 (28.7)	87.6 (30.9)	85.4 (29.7)	81.1 (27.3)	72.8 (22.7)	57.7 (14.3)	46.6 (8.1)	87.6 (30.9)
Mean daily maximum °F (°C)	25.9 (−3.4)	31.1 (−0.5)	42.3 (5.7)	52.1 (11.2)	62.1 (16.7)	73.1 (22.8)	79.2 (26.2)	77.1 (25.1)	70.1 (21.2)	56.9 (13.8)	41.0 (5.0)	28.2 (−2.1)	53.3 (11.8)
Daily mean °F (°C)	13.0 (−10.6)	17.4 (−8.1)	28.5 (−1.9)	37.9 (3.3)	46.9 (8.3)	55.8 (13.2)	61.9 (16.6)	60.1 (15.6)	52.5 (11.4)	41.0 (5.0)	27.9 (−2.3)	15.8 (−9.0)	38.2 (3.5)
Mean daily minimum °F (°C)	0.1 (−17.7)	3.7 (−15.7)	14.6 (−9.7)	23.7 (−4.6)	31.7 (−0.2)	38.4 (3.6)	44.5 (6.9)	43.0 (6.1)	34.9 (1.6)	25.1 (−3.8)	14.7 (−9.6)	3.5 (−15.8)	23.2 (−4.9)
Mean minimum °F (°C)	−20.6 (−29.2)	−17.3 (−27.4)	−6.0 (−21.1)	9.7 (−12.4)	20.2 (−6.6)	28.6 (−1.9)	36.2 (2.3)	34.6 (1.4)	23.1 (−4.9)	9.7 (−12.4)	−5.6 (−20.9)	−16.3 (−26.8)	−24.1 (−31.2)
Record low °F (°C)	−33 (−36)	−44 (−42)	−25 (−32)	−9 (−23)	12 (−11)	20 (−7)	30 (−1)	23 (−5)	11 (−12)	−9 (−23)	−23 (−31)	−32 (−36)	−44 (−42)
Average precipitation inches (mm)	1.00 (25)	0.95 (24)	0.98 (25)	1.46 (37)	1.53 (39)	0.99 (25)	1.44 (37)	1.44 (37)	1.40 (36)	1.26 (32)	0.92 (23)	0.88 (22)	14.25 (362)
Average snowfall inches (cm)	14.2 (36)	13.6 (35)	10.4 (26)	11.9 (30)	2.7 (6.9)	0.1 (0.25)	0.0 (0.0)	0.0 (0.0)	0.3 (0.76)	4.8 (12)	9.9 (25)	13.3 (34)	81.2 (205.91)
Average precipitation days (≥ 0.01 in)	10.1	9.9	8.0	9.8	9.7	6.8	9.4	10.3	8.3	7.5	8.4	9.1	107.3
Average snowy days (≥ 0.1 in)	7.6	7.7	5.5	4.8	1.3	0.1	0.0	0.0	0.2	2.3	5.8	7.2	42.5
Source 1: NOAA
Source 2: National Weather Service

== See also ==
- Phillips-Williams Fork Reservoir Site
- Williams Fork Reservoir
