= Cheers season 8 =

Cheers
- Season 8
- Region 1 DVD
- Showrunners: Cheri Eichen & Bill Steinkellner; Phoef Sutton
- Starring: Ted Danson; Kirstie Alley; Rhea Perlman; John Ratzenberger; Woody Harrelson; Kelsey Grammer; George Wendt
- No. of episodes: 26

Release
- Original network: NBC
- Original release: September 21, 1989 – May 3, 1990

Season chronology
- ← Previous; Season 7 Next → Season 9

The eighth season of the American television sitcom Cheers aired on NBC from September 21, 1989, to May 3, 1990. The show was created by director James Burrows and writers Glen and Les Charles under production team Charles Burrows Charles Productions, in association with Paramount Television.

At the 1990 42nd Primetime Emmy Awards, this season won three Emmys: Outstanding Lead Actor in a Comedy Series (Ted Danson), Outstanding Supporting Actress in a Comedy Series (Bebe Neuwirth), and Outstanding Sound Mixing for a Comedy Series or Special. It also won the Best Television Series – Musical or Comedy and Best Performance by an Actress in a Television Series – Musical or Comedy (Kirstie Alley) at the 1991 48th Golden Globe Awards.

== Background ==
This season premiered on September 21, 1989, and aired on Thursdays at 9:00 pm Eastern / 8:00 pm Central. Besides Cheers, other series in NBC's Thursday night lineup for the 1989–90 season were The Cosby Show, A Different World, Dear John and L.A. Law. In January 1990, Dear John was shifted to Wednesdays, and the newer sitcom Grand took its spot.

== Cast and characters ==
- Ted Danson as Sam Malone, a womanizing bartender and ex-baseball player. While he still pursues many women, he fails to impress especially classier ones. He continues his efforts to buy back Cheers, which he sold to its current owner, the Lillian Corporation, in the sixth season.
- Kirstie Alley as Rebecca Howe, a corporate bar owner and manager. Since her debut in the sixth season, she has struggled to be noticed by her superiors at the Lillian Corporation. This season, she has been dating an English multimillionaire, Robin Colcord. He owns her company's competitor and plans to take over Lillian Corporation.
- Rhea Perlman as Carla Tortelli, a waitress and mother of eight children, including five from her first marriage. Her current husband, Eddie LeBec, dies in an accident while saving someone. She then learns that he committed bigamy by marrying another woman who is pregnant with twins, while he was still married to Carla.
- John Ratzenberger as Cliff Clavin, a postal carrier and loquacious, barfly know-it-all.
- Woody Harrelson as Woody Boyd, a dim bartender. He dates a less-than-bright rich woman named Kelly Gaines, whose family disapproves of him.
- Kelsey Grammer as Frasier Crane, a psychiatrist now married to Lilith. Their son Frederick is born during this season.
- George Wendt as Norm Peterson, an accountant and a house painter.

Recurring characters

- Bebe Neuwirth as Lilith Sternin, a psychiatrist now married to Frasier. She gives birth to their son Frederick.
- Roger Rees as Robin Colcord, an English multimillionaire. He dates his love interest Rebecca, who works for his competitor Lillian Corporation, and a couple other women simultaneously. He uses her to take over his competitor but then realizes that he loves her very much.
- Jackie Swanson as Kelly Gaines, a less-than-bright rich woman. She dates bartender Woody despite her family's disapproval. Swanson reprises her role as Kelly in three episodes this season.

== Episodes ==
No. overall	No. in season	Title	Directed by	Written by	Original release date	U.S. viewers (millions)	Rating/share/rank (households)
169	1	"The Improbable Dream"	James Burrows	Cheri Eichen & Bill Steinkellner	September 21, 1989	36.4	24.1 / 39 / #3
170	2	"The Improbable Dream"	James Burrows	Cheri Eichen & Bill Steinkellner	September 28, 1989	36.1	24.3 / 39 / #3
Part 1: Rebecca dreams of making love to Sam and is horrified. Sam overhears her confessing her dreams to the Cranes. He uses a cassette tape of rain sounds in an effort to make her fall asleep, allowing him to seduce her. Unaffected, Rebecca confronts him, foiling the plan. She is close to giving into Sam, however, when multimillionaire Robin Colcord enters the scene and interrupts their lovemaking. Part 2: Robin Colcord enters the bar's office to tell Rebecca that, rather than sell a South End property as she suggested in her letters to him, he is developing the property "as an exclusive urban complex". Rebecca accepts Robin's offer to take her to Beverly Hills, California. While they travel around the West Coast, Sam realizes that he cares about her. At the office, Sam is ready to confess his concerns to her but then backs down when Robin seizes the opportunity first, saying that he cares about her "very, very deeply". When Robin leaves, Rebecca reluctantly hints to Sam that she and Robin have not yet made love. She fears that when they do, he will lose interest in her and leave. Sam figures that she finds him more sexually interesting than Robin, which a horrified Rebecca denies.
171	3	"A Bar Is Born"	James Burrows	Phoef Sutton	October 12, 1989	33.6	22.4 / 37 / #3
Sam reevaluates his life and his job as a bartender. When the gang lifts his spirits, Norm suggests that Sam use a loan to buy an old abandoned bar that went bankrupt a year earlier. Initially the gang is skeptical due to the bar's dilapidated condition, but then realize some parts of it remain intact and undamaged. The following day, Robin inspires Sam to come up with the idea of turning a whole block, and the abandoned bar, into newer buildings, including a high-rise. Robin tells Sam he cannot afford the block. He encourages Sam to say what he really wants, which is to buy back Cheers. The following day, Robin tells Sam that he has already bought the whole block to develop Sam's idea (for which Robin takes credit). Sam feels cheated.
172	4	"How to Marry a Mailman"	James Burrows	Brian Pollack & Mert Rich	October 19, 1989	37.2	24.7 / 38 / #1
Cliff's old flame Margaret O'Keefe (Annie Golden) returns from Canada to offer him a committed relationship, which literally blinds him. Frasier theorizes that Cliff's hysterical blindness is caused by his fear of commitment. Sam explains the situation to Maggie. She feels bad and decides to return to Canada. Cliff stops her and declares his commitment to her. Meanwhile, Rebecca crashes into a plastic surgeon's car. Instead of reporting her, he offers her surgery, which she accepts, having an old tattoo and her mole (disguised by the tattoo) removed.
173	5	"The Two Faces of Norm"	Andy Ackerman	Eugene B. Stein	October 26, 1989	35.7	24.1 / 39 / #3
Norm hires workers for his painting business, with which he has been preoccupied. Rather than boss them around, Norm lets them slack off. Tired of being exploited, Norm invents a nonexistent business partner named "Anton Kreitzer". While Norm continues the charade, the workers become tired of Kreitzer's treatment of them. Sam drives Norm in a used Volaré—a replacement for his Corvette, which he sold to Lilith to earn money to buy back Cheers—to Norm's business. They arrive just before the workers who have come to confront "Kreitzer". Norm goes into "Kreitzer"'s office—actually, the back alley filled with garbage—and confronts him telling him that he will take the workers and form a new business. The workers scold Norm for upsetting "Kreitzer", however, and reject his offer. A few hours later one of the workers, Rudy (Eric Allen Kramer), returns to Kreitzer's office only to discover the charade. While Frasier orders Lilith to return the Corvette to Sam, Rudy confronts Norm, assuming that Norm is truly "Kreitzer", and quits. Norm fails to convince Rudy otherwise.
174	6	"The Stork Brings a Crane"	Andy Ackerman	David Lloyd	November 2, 1989	37.6	24.4 / 37 / #3
Rebecca invites Boston Mayor Raymond Flynn to Cheers' centennial anniversary party. The mayor meets Cliff and has him arrested for sending him threatening letters. Then he almost presents a plaque indicating the bar's landmark status. However, Lilith feels labor pains since she is two weeks overdue. Having witnessed the event, Flynn withholds the plaque and leaves the bar. Frasier's car has been towed, so Sam uses his Corvette to take Frasier and Lilith to a hospital. They discover that the pains are simply contractions. Sam and Frasier help another woman give birth. Lilith is discharged but then gives birth to a son named Frederick in a taxicab and then is sent back to the hospital.
175	7	"Death Takes a Holiday on Ice"	James Burrows	Ken Levine & David Isaacs	November 9, 1989	36.2	24.3 / 38 / #2
Carla receives news that her husband Eddie died when he fell into an ice resurfacer while he was saving an ice show performer from it. At Eddie's funeral, when the name "Mrs. LeBec" is announced, Carla and another woman named Gloria (Anne De Salvo) stand up to discover they are both married to Eddie. The women argue and then fight, leading to a brawl. Later, Gloria enters the bar. She tells Carla that like her, she also has twins. Carla feels that Eddie must have loved Gloria more than her. Soon, Gordie Brown (Thomas Hayden Church), the man Eddie saved, arrives. He gives Carla a letter Eddie gave to him a few months earlier. It says that he felt guilty for hiding the truth from Carla about impregnating and secretly marrying Gloria, and that Carla has been the love of his life. Gordie does not have a letter for Gloria, disappointing her. Rather than let Gloria take a bus home, Carla allows her to stay at her house for the time being.
176	8	"For Real Men Only"	James Burrows	David Pollock & Elias Davis	November 16, 1989	36.1	24.0 / 37 / #4
To honor her Jewish faith, Frasier and Lilith decide to circumcise their newborn son Frederick at a scheduled bris. Frasier reconsiders after witnessing the graphic nature of the ritual and takes Frederick to Cheers. Lilith enters the bar and convinces Frasier to allow the ceremony to continue. Rebecca has trouble enlivening a retirement party in the billiard room for a very dull corporate employee—Larry (Jay Robinson). She organizes a wet T-shirt contest in an effort to do so, but the contest becomes depressing when the models tell their sad stories. Jaded, Rebecca allows Frederick's bris to take place in the billiard room at the same time. Consequently, the retirement party livens up, and Larry plans to marry one of the models. Meanwhile, Carla petitions to have her late husband Eddie's Boston Bruins number retired to honor him. Despite her efforts, including forging signatures, the hockey team's executives refuse to retire the number but give her season tickets to the Bruins' games instead.
177	9	"Two Girls for Every Boyd"	James Burrows	Dan O'Shannon & Tom Anderson	November 23, 1989	28.4	16.5 / 31 / #13
Woody is cast as George, one of leading roles in a community theater production of Our Town, alongside highly praised actress Emily, (Lisa Kudrow), cast as the character of the same name. However, Woody has trouble performing love scenes convincingly with Emily. At the bar, Kelly walks into the billiard room to see Woody and Emily kissing while rehearsing a love scene. Kelly realizes that Woody kept his leading role a secret. Woody admits he did this because he felt that Kelly would be uncomfortable seeing him kiss another woman in a play. Then Woody tells Kelly that he loves her. When he fails to convincingly say the same thing to Emily, Emily tells him the director will replace him if he is not convincing in the love scene. Woody immediately says "I love you" to Emily and realizes that fear is a key to successful acting. Meanwhile, Cliff wins the bar's beard-growing contest through cheating. In this episode, Frasier tells patrons that his father was neglectful and a busy scientist before he died. In Frasier his father Martin is a retired cop and alive. This contradiction is clarified in "The Show Where Sam Shows Up".
178	10	"The Art of the Steal"	James Burrows	Sue Herring	November 30, 1989	37.1	25.4 / 40 / #2
Frustrated that Robin spends little time with her, Rebecca sneaks into his apartment to surprise him. Sam, told by Carla about Rebecca's plans, goes to the apartment to seduce her after learning Robin will be late. When she tries to kick Sam out, Rebecca accidentally activates Robin's security system, which also locks the elevator doors and windows. Sam and Rebecca spend the night talking briefly and then sleeping. The next morning, when the system is deactivated, they leave the apartment without being seen by anyone. Meanwhile, Frasier is aghast to see other players "lie, steal, and cheat" while playing Monopoly. Norm tells him that they were teaching Woody about the harsh side of the economy (which Woody was curious about in the beginning).
179	11	"Feeble Attraction"	Andy Ackerman	Dan O'Shannon & Tom Anderson	December 7, 1989	36.2	24.2 / 38 / #2
Norm's painting business flounders. He fires his secretary Doris, (Cynthia Stevenson), giving her a letter of recommendation. Mistaking it as a love letter, she becomes infatuated with and then stalks Norm. He eventually rehires her to return things to normal. Robin delivers an antique desk to Rebecca containing a paper hinting at a "ring". She assumes it is an engagement ring. A deliveryman then gives Sam a box that fell from the desk. It contains a certificate of authenticity revealing that writer George Bernard Shaw previously owned the desk. The "ring" is a dark circle "visible on the desktop" where Shaw set his tea cup. The desk's value contains a five and many zeros, i.e. is very high. Rebecca is disassembling the desk, however, still unaware of the actual "ring". Woody obsesses over a weather record and wins a trip to Hawaii—actually, one of the show's tricks—on a radio contest with his knowledge. Cynthia Stevenson first appeared as Doris in the episode "The Two Faces of Norm".
180	12	"Sam Ahoy"	James Burrows	David Lloyd	December 14, 1989	33.3	22.5 / 36 / #2
Robin receives a fax from his bauxite miners saying that he must either negotiate or face a wildcat strike action at midnight. He lends Sam his sailboat for a race whose grand prize is $10,000. If he wins, this would give Sam another opportunity to buy back Cheers. Sam chooses Carla and Norm as his crew. During the race they discover a time bomb in the boat's refrigerator. The boat's radio is already disassembled, sharks are swimming around the boat, and the inflatable lifeboat has been sabotaged. Running out of options, they manage to sail to an inlet and escaped to shore before the boat exploded. Later in the bar, when Robin arrives from his meeting, he offers Sam the opportunity to sign release forms to share Robin's insurance policy and then offers him $60,000. Sam declines them both, to Carla and Norm's dismay.
181	13	"Sammy and the Professor"	James Burrows	Brian Pollack & Mert Rich	January 4, 1990	35.8	24.2 / 36 / #1
Rebecca invites one of her professors, Alice Anne Volkman (Alexis Smith), for dinner at Melville's. Sam tags along to discuss with Volkman how to buy back Cheers. The following day, Volkman tells Rebecca that she and Sam slept together at a hotel. Infuriated, Rebecca orders Sam to end the relationship. Later, at the office, Volkman tells her they slept together again at the same hotel, prompting Rebecca to call her a "slut". Volkman praises Rebecca for expressing her own opinions without worrying about offending others. Meanwhile, Carla is audited by the IRS, so she forges multiple receipts.
182	14	"What Is... Cliff Clavin?"	Andy Ackerman	Dan O'Shannon & Tom Anderson	January 18, 1990	37.7	24.7 / 37 / #1
Cliff appears on Jeopardy!, performing well. For the final Jeopardy clue, "Archibald Leach, Bernard Schwartz and Lucille LeSueur", he wagers $22,000 and loses it by responding incorrectly: "Who are three people who've never been in my kitchen?" Cliff objects and argues, demanding that his answer be accepted. The show's host, Alex Trebek, later arrives at Cheers, tells Cliff that his response should have been accepted, and announces his resignation as host. Cliff convinces Trebek to stay by telling him how much he and Jeopardy mean to him. When Cliff leaves the scene, Trebek reveals to Norm that the story about quitting the show was a fabrication to placate, Cliff who scares him. Meanwhile, Sam discovers that a thief stole his "little black book" and has been impersonating him to make dates he never shows up for. After investigating, the thief is revealed a teenage boy who wants to become a "babe hound" like Sam. Letting him go, Sam tells the boy to start as a "babe pup", to call girls around his age, and gives him $25 for a haircut.
183	15	"Finally!"	James Burrows	Ken Levine & David Isaacs	January 25, 1990	37.9	25.0 / 37 / #3
184	16	"Finally!"	James Burrows	Ken Levine & David Isaacs	February 1, 1990	33.4	22.7 / 34 / #2
Part 1: While heading to a dinner party, Robin and Rebecca start to make love in his limo. The following day, the fulfilled Rebecca takes the gang to Little Wally's Pup 'n' Burger, where Robin took her the night after the party, to hang out. Later at Little Wally's, when Rebecca goes to the women's restroom to clean a stain from her clothes, Sam sees Robin with another woman going to Little Wally's. Part 2: At Little Wally's, to prevent Rebecca from finding out about Robin and another woman, Sam uses his jacket to cover her head while they run from a nonexistent fire. The following day, Robin offers Sam the ownership of Cheers just to silence him about the affair. When she plans to move into Robin's apartment, Sam tells Rebecca the whole truth about Robin. Rebecca does not believe him until she meets one of Robin's women named Christine Devi in his limousine. The two women confront Robin, who admits that he also has a chargé d'affaires (diplomat) as a third woman. While Christine breaks up with him, Rebecca makes love again with Robin in the limo. Later at the bar, Rebecca tells Sam that she is considering breaking up with Robin. Then Robin arrives to give her a diamond bracelet as a gift. She initially rejects it, but when Robin considers giving it to the chargé d'affaires yet puts Rebecca in the lead for her "standards", Rebecca takes the bracelet and continues to go out with him.
185	17	"Woody or Won't He"	Andy Ackerman	Brian Pollack & Mert Rich	February 8, 1990	34.5	22.8 / 35 / #2
Kelly's divorced mother, Roxanne (Melendy Britt), invites Woody to her sister's wedding rehearsal dinner. While everyone else is having hors d'oeuvres, in another room Roxanne kisses Woody, terrifying him. Sam, also invited by Kelly, spends $1,000 on a stockbroker's company stock that turns out to be worthless. Woody loudly rejects Roxanne's advances in front of the guests, humiliating Kelly. Later at the bar, Kelly apologizes to Woody on behalf of Roxanne, who has flirted with Kelly's previous boyfriends, which she passes off as mere "innocent flirts". Then Kelly gives him Roxanne's letter, which, unbeknownst to Kelly, is a love letter. After Kelly leaves, Woody reads the letter and passes it off as a joke. Meanwhile, Cliff has been stuck on a bankrupt restaurant's mechanical bull for hours in the billiard room and wants to get off it. When firefighters cover the walls with mattresses so he can safely get off the bull, the bar patrons insist he stay on for five more hours to break the world record.
186	18	"Severe Crane Damage"	Andy Ackerman	Dan O'Shannon & Tom Anderson	February 15, 1990	35.2	23.3 / 35 / #2
A talk show host brings Lilith's invited guests Sam (bad boy) and Frasier (good boy) to the stage as examples for Lilith's latest book Good Girls, Bad Boys, much to Lilith's chagrin. Sam impresses the female guests, while Frasier fails to do so. Lilith inadvertently becomes infatuated with, and then kisses, Sam. Later, Frasier questions himself whether he is too much of a "good boy", so he begins dating a female motorcyclist who then offers him a ride to Florida. He declines and reconciles with Lilith. Meanwhile, the gang teases Cliff over his fears of suffering from side effects, like enlarged breasts, while taking medication to relieve job stress.
187	19	"Indoor Fun with Sammy and Robby"	Andy Ackerman	Phoef Sutton	February 22, 1990	35.8	23.6 / 36 / #1
Robin spends his day off competing with Sam at darts and pool. Sam wins the games. Robin chooses chess, which he considers more intellectually challenging, as the next game to play. While they are playing, the bar patrons assist Sam using a chess game on Rebecca's computer and a transmitter. The computer goes out, putting Sam at a disadvantage. Despite this, he makes a few moves that help him win without their assistance. However, Robin reveals that he knew Sam was cheating, so he teasingly awards him a penny. Rebecca, disappointed that Robin did not spend his entire day with her, confronts the pair about their behavior. However, Sam and Robin then play a thumb war, disappointing Rebecca again.
188	20	"50–50 Carla"	James Burrows	David Lloyd	March 8, 1990	34.4	23.4 / 36 / #2
Carla and Eddie's other widow Gloria (Anne De Salvo) get along well. Carla receives a letter from the ice show company naming her the beneficiary of Eddie's $50,000 accident policy. Carla plans to break her promise to split Eddie's estate with Gloria. When she becomes suspicious that Gloria knows about the money, Carla reluctantly gives her half of the settlement. Gloria is ungrateful. Despite this, Carla feels that she did the right thing. Meanwhile, Woody is cast in a revival of Hair, which includes a nude scene. Worried, Woody goes topless at the bar for practice. During the opening night show, Woody appears nude, but is the only actor to do so, embarrassing himself. John Ratzenberger does not appear in this episode, though Cliff is briefly mentioned.
189	21	"Bar Wars III: The Return of Tecumseh"	James Burrows	Ken Levine & David Isaacs	March 15, 1990	32.6	22.1 / 35 / #1
St. Patrick's Day is unusual at Cheers. Cliff is reluctant to discuss trivial matters. Norm feels full after drinking enough beers that do not taste normal as before. Then the gang notices that the bar's wooden statue of Tecumseh is missing. Their rival Gary is the suspected culprit. Sam, Norm, and Cliff pose as city workers and close Gary's Olde Towne Tavern due to nonexistent toxic waste. Soon, the statue of Tecumseh returns; Rebecca reveals that she sent it to be revarnished. Fearing Gary's retaliation, Sam, Norm, Cliff, and Woody have their hair cut spelling Gary's name one letter on each head. However, the gang realizes that Sam has been wearing a fake bald cap to cover his hair. Rebecca enters the scene and reveals the Tavern has been closed for renovations for a month and Gary has been in Florida. While the gang wants to get even with Gary, they first chase after Sam to cut his hair. In this episode, Frasier claims that both his parents are dead. However, his father Martin turns up alive in Frasier. The inconsistency is clarified in the episode "The Show Where Sam Shows Up".
190	22	"Loverboyd"	James Burrows	Brian Pollack & Mert Rich	March 29, 1990	35.5	23.8 / 38 / #2
Woody gives his father's promise ring to his girlfriend Kelly, who is to be sent away to Europe. When Woody makes insulting remarks about her father Walter (Richard Doyle), she returns the ring to him. To make up, Woody goes to the Gaines' manor and climbs up a ladder, with Sam's assistance, to Kelly's room. He proposes they elope. When Walter arrives, Woody hides in her closet and then overhears Kelly and Walter sharing their father-daughter moment together, prompting him to back down from the idea and allow Kelly to go to Europe. Meanwhile, Norm is discovered not to have put his name into a hat for the first drawing for the "designated driver" contest. The bar patrons vengefully write Norm's name for a new draw, making him the driver and keeping him from drinking.
191	23	"The Ghost and Mrs. Lebec"	James Burrows	Dan Staley & Rob Long	April 12, 1990	30.1	19.7 / 33 / #2
While Sam stays home recovering from chickenpox, Carla goes out with a Boston Red Sox player, Darryl Mead (Kevin Conroy), only to see visions of her dead husband Eddie LeBec in an ice hockey uniform. Frasier suggests that she see a psychiatrist; instead, she invites psychic Madame Lazora (Georgia Brown) to channel Eddie's spirit. When Madame Lazora performs a séance, a skeptical Frasier angrily calls the process a "sham". Carla argues with Frasier, saying that she believes in Madame Lazora and she has probably conjured up images of Eddie because she fears going out on her first date since Eddie's death. Madame Lazora claims that Eddie's spirit says that Carla was right, irritating Frasier. Carla pays her $250 for the 15-minute session, feels that she made peace with Eddie, and happily decides to continue dating Darryl. Meanwhile, Rebecca appears on a talk show Consumer Patrol to complain about a defective leg shaving device. She rescinds her complaint when she realizes that a company owned by her love interest, Robin Colcord, made the product. Ted Danson was forced to skip filming for this episode due to chickenpox. Danson only has a brief appearance in the cold open that was filmed separately following his recovery. Kevin Conroy first appeared as Darryl Mead in "Death Takes a Holiday on Ice."
192	24	"Mr. Otis Regrets"	Andy Ackerman	Ken Levine & David Isaacs	April 19, 1990	32.9	21.9 / 35 / #1
Robin and the chargé d'affaires, named Jeanne-Marie, are supposed to attend a ball in Boston. Rebecca sends Sam to spy on them. The following day, Sam tells Rebecca he had sex with Jeanne-Marie in an elevator. This did not happen because the ball was cancelled due to a broken water pipe. Rebecca insists Sam show her what Jeanne-Marie did that made her such a good lover. They go to the elevator where Rebecca leaves Sam tied up and half-naked. Woody chooses a woman named Terry (Christine Cavanaugh) as his roommate to cover the increased rent for his apartment. He meets Terry's husband, Cutter Gardner (Eric Bruskotter), to whom Terry wants to return. Woody points out Cliff as Terry's "roommate" just to have jealous Cutter chase after Cliff. Lilith sings "Sonny Boy" as Frederick's lullaby, impressing Frasier and the bar patrons who were skeptical about her singing.
193	25	"Cry Hard"	James Burrows	Dan O'Shannon & Tom Anderson	April 26, 1990	31.8	21.2 / 34 / #2
194	26	"Cry Harder"	James Burrows	Story by : Bill Steinkellner; Teleplay by : Cheri Eichen & Bill Steinkellner & Phoef Sutton	May 3, 1990	30.8	21.1 / 33 / #3
"Part 1": Robin buys his lover Jeanne-Marie a new house and invites Rebecca to move in with him. Rebecca enlists Sam and Norm to move furniture into it while Robin is in Zürich to surprise him. They discover Robin's papers revealing classified information about Rebecca's company, Lillian Corporation, also Robin's competitor. They realize that Robin has hacked into Rebecca's company computer since the day after they first made love, part of Robin's hostile takeover plan. The following day, Rebecca goes to the Lillian Corporation, planning to show Robin's papers to the board of directors. Robin arrives, having returned from Zürich, and proposes marriage to Rebecca. She accepts. Robin then snatches his papers from Sam, who is holding them while trying to convince her to reconsider, and Robin shreds them with his portable shredder. After Robin and Rebecca leave, one of the corporate executives tells Sam the board is suspicious of Rebecca, who will be reported to authorities. To protect her, Sam names Robin as the main culprit. "Part 2": Indicted for insider trading, Robin is bailed out because of his clean record. As a reward for turning Robin in, an executive of the Lillian Corporation offers Sam the opportunity to buy back Cheers for $1. Without money on him, Sam collects eighty-five cents from others, which the executive accepts as the official purchase amount. Furious about Sam's involvement, Rebecca plans to quit Cheers and follow Robin, who has jumped bail and fled the United States on his private jet. She devastatingly receives Robin's fax saying, "Goodbye forever" and then, the following day, a termination letter from her company. Out of pity, Sam rehires Rebecca as a waitress. At night, she splashes drinks on male customers. Sam confronts her in the office about her recent behavior and her failures in life. Then Sam and Rebecca make love. At closing time, Robin arrives, returning from abroad, having realized that he loves her. He is aghast to find Sam and Rebecca together in the office.

Specials

No.	Title	Directed by	Written by	Original release date
S05	"Disneyland's 35th Anniversary Celebration"	John Landis & James Burrows (Cheers sketch)	Joe Guppy, Nancy T. Harris, Joie Albrecht & Scot Garen	February 4, 1990
The special is book-ended by the gang watching it at Cheers. It also includes an extended sequence of young Woody Boyd's experience touring the haunted mansion at Disneyland. Aired as an episode of the Wonderful World of Disney. Sketches included the Jungle Cruise ride, The Muppets, Ernest, and Will Smith.
S06	"The Earth Day Special"	James Burrows (Cheers segment)	Armyan Bernstein, Richard Baskin & Various Writers	April 22, 1990
The gang (minus Carla) are watching the events happening on the Earth Day Special, and discuss ways they can help the environment. The Earth Day Special was hosted by real-life husband and wife, Rhea Perlman and Danny DeVito, thus Carla does not appear in the Cheers segment they are watching.

== Production ==
In November 1989, actor Roger Rees told news agency Knight-Ridder Wire about Robin Colcord, the character whom Rees portrayed:

They needed a fillip, to give them a boost, someone to drive Sam [Malone] crazy. Robin's there to be dashing, sexy, irritating. He's not as charming and nice as he appears to be at first sight. He's sort of the villain of the piece. He's a megalomaniac millionaire. He's got an airline and a helicopter fleet. It's very much Donald Trump.

In January 1990, actor Rees said that he had not based "the character on anyone", despite "speculation that Colcord was a British version of Trump", wrote Phil Kloer of Cox News Service.

== Critical reception ==
Ken Tucker of Entertainment Weekly graded the season an A−, calling it "still awfully funny". He praised the supporting characters but criticizing the development of Sam Malone and Rebecca Howe. Jeffrey Robinson of DVDTalk rated the season's content three-and-a-half stars out of five and its replay value four out of five.

== Accolades ==
At the 42nd Primetime Emmy Awards (1990), this season won three Emmys: Outstanding Lead Actor in a Comedy Series (Ted Danson), Outstanding Supporting Actress in a Comedy Series (Bebe Neuwirth), and Outstanding Sound Mixing for a Comedy Series or Special. Before his eighth nomination and Emmy win, Danson had seven consecutive Emmy nominations for the role of Sam Malone, and a nomination for his leading role in a 1984 television film Something About Amelia. Danson also won a Golden Globe award for Best Performance by an Actor in a Television Series (Musical or Comedy) at the 47th (1990) and 48th Golden Globe Awards (1991). The 1990 season also won the Best Television Series – Musical or Comedy and Best Performance by an Actress in a Television Series – Musical or Comedy (Kirstie Alley) at the 48th Golden Globe Awards (1991).

== DVD release ==
Cheers: The Complete Eighth Season
Set Details
26 episodes; 4-disc set; 1:33:1 aspect ratio; English – Stereo; Closed captioning (Region 1); Subtitles: Danish, Dutch, English, Norwegian, Spanish (Region 2)
Release Dates
Region 1	Region 2	Region 4
June 13, 2006	August 6, 2012	April 27, 2009
