= Endako mine =

Molybdenum mine in British Columbia, Canada

- Interactive map of Endako mine
- Location: Fraser Lake, British Columbia, Canada; 54.0348°N 125.1017°W
- Products: Molybdenum
- Opened: 1965
- Closed: 2015

The Endako mine (/ɪnˈdækoʊ/) is one of the largest molybdenum mines in North America. The mine is located near Fraser Lake, British Columbia, Canada. The Endako mine has reserves amounting to 448.4 million tonnes of molybdenum ore grading 0.033% molybdenum thus resulting 148,000 tonnes of molybdenum.

The mine suspended production in 2015 "due to recent and expected ongoing weakness in the molybdenum price". Centerra Gold indicated at that time it expected "to re-evaluate the status of Endako Mine as market conditions warrant."

== See also ==
- List of molybdenum mines
