= Bruno Creek Tailings Impoundment =

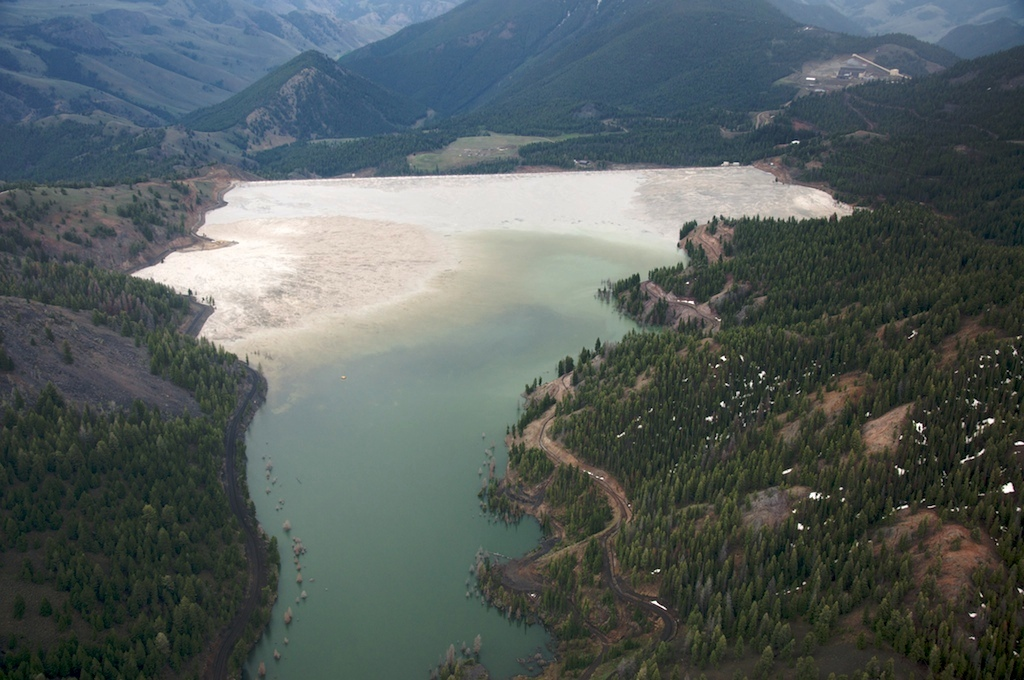
- View of the tailings pond from upstream of the dam

- Location within Idaho
- Country: United States
- Location: Custer County, near Challis
- Coordinates: 44°19′13″N 114°30′52″W
- Status: Operational
- Opening date: 1983
- Owner: Thompson Creek Mining Company

Dam and spillways
- Type of dam: Tailings, center-line
- Height: 550 ft (168 m)

Reservoir
- Total capacity: 100,000,000 t (98,420,653 long tons; 110,231,131 short tons)

The Bruno Creek Tailings Impoundment is a tailings dam on Bruno Creek, 19 mi (31 km) southwest of Challis in Custer County, Idaho. It serves to store tailings for the nearby Thompson Creek Mine. At 550 ft (168 m) tall, it is the second tallest center-line tailings dam in the world. In 2008, Phase 8 of the mine was approved which includes a raising of the dam to 750 ft (229 m). The dam is mainly composed of cycloned sand. Currently, the dam stores 100,000,000 t (98,420,653 long tons; 110,231,131 short tons) of tailings and the raise would increase storage to 125,000,000 t (123,025,816 long tons; 137,788,914 short tons). The downstream slope of the dam will be steepened from 3:1 to 2.75:1. In 1994, it was discovered that acid mine drainage had been forming on the embankment since 1987. Since seepage does occur at the dam, a system of wells was installed to monitor groundwater and a seepage return dam was constructed downstream.
