= What Is... Cliff Clavin? =

- Cheers episode
- Episode no.: Season 8 Episode 14
- Directed by: Andy Ackerman
- Written by: Dan O'Shannon; Tom Anderson
- Production code: 182
- Original air date: January 18, 1990

Guest appearances
- Alex Trebek as himself; Johnny Gilbert as himself; Greg E. Davis as Timmy

Episode chronology
← Previous "Sammy and the Professor"	Next → "Finally! Part 1"
- Cheers (season 8)

"What Is... Cliff Clavin?" is the fourteenth episode of the eighth season of the American television sitcom Cheers, co-written by Dan O'Shannon and Tom Anderson, and directed by Andy Ackerman rather than James Burrows, who directed most of the other episodes of the series. It originally aired on January 18, 1990, on NBC. In this episode, Cliff Clavin (John Ratzenberger) appears on the game show Jeopardy! and game show host Alex Trebek guest stars as himself. Cliff racks up an insurmountable lead during the game, only to lose it all in the final round. The episode received praise from critics for its concept and its guest star.

== Plot ==
Cliff Clavin competes on the television game show Jeopardy!, which has temporarily moved taping to Boston for a special occasion. Cliff amasses $22,000 by the end of the Double Jeopardy! round, more than twice the score of the second place contestant, theoretically ensuring a win. For the Final Jeopardy! clue of "Archibald Leach, Bernard Schwartz and Lucille LeSueur" in the category of "Movies", Cliff responds incorrectly with "Who are 3 people who've never been in my kitchen?" (The correct response was "What were the real names of Cary Grant, Tony Curtis, and Joan Crawford?"), signing the amount of his wager as "$22,000 Big Ones!" Having overconfidently wagered his entire score as revealed, Cliff loses all of his winnings and the match. Cliff objects and argues, demanding that his response be accepted.

The show's host, Alex Trebek, later arrives at Cheers. Trebek tells Cliff that his response should have been accepted earlier, and announces to Cliff his resignation as the host of Jeopardy!. However, Cliff convinces Trebek to remain as host by telling him how much the show and Trebek mean to him. After Cliff shares the news with others that he "saved Jeopardy!", Norm Peterson praises Trebek for doing this just to make Cliff feel better. However, Trebek says that he did not realize that Cliff was at the bar and that meeting him had been a coincidence. Trebek says that Cliff scares him and that the story about quitting the show was a fabrication to placate him.

Meanwhile, Sam Malone receives telephone calls from women whom he previously dated; they are angry with him for making dates and then not showing up. Sam eventually discovers that his "little black book" has been stolen. Through detective work, Sam discovers that the thief has called Sam's women in alphabetical order, and that Rebecca Howe is the next recipient on the list. Carla Tortelli uses her bluff to blackmail the reluctant Rebecca into helping Sam capture the thief. The thief calls Rebecca, who asks him to meet her at the bar instead of the roller rink. Then the thief enters, turning out to be a teenage boy named Timmy (Greg E. Davis), who wants to become a "babe hound" like Sam. After getting his little black book back, Sam lets Timmy go, advising him to start as a "babe pup" and to call girls around his age, and gives him $25 for a haircut and a tip for a shampoo girl.

== Production ==
Dan O'Shannon and Tom Anderson co-wrote "What Is... Cliff Clavin?", and Andy Ackerman directed the episode. Bernard Kuby portrays Earl, a bar patron in the cold opening returning to Cheers for the first time since he moved to Alaska in the 1960s and explaining the bar's interior differences between the 1960s and 1980s, with only Norm remaining unchanged. Jeopardy! announcer Johnny Gilbert also made a guest appearance as himself announcing the game show. William A. Porter portrays one of the Jeopardy! contestants, Milford Reynolds, a doctor of neurosurgery. Audrey Lowell portrays the other contestant, Agnes Borsic, a lawyer who eventually becomes the top winner after Cliff wagered and then lost all of his winnings. Peter Schreiner and Steven Rotblatt are credited for their background appearances.

== Reception ==
General Norman Schwarzkopf said this was the funniest episode of Cheers. Don Leighton from Superior Telegram called this episode the greatest and said the Final Jeopardy! moment was hilarious. Jeffrey Robinson from DVD Talk said the concept of the episode was a riot. Hot Springs Village Voice called Cliff's Final Jeopardy! moment a classic example of his mishaps caused by his own "know-it-all nature". Andrew Razeghi, in his book Hope, called this episode "one of the most memorable episodes" of Cheers, found Cliff's response to the Final Jeopardy! clue neither right nor wrong and an example of divergent thinking, and called Cliff a poster child for Joy Paul Guilford. Former Jeopardy! contestant turned host Ken Jennings, in his book Brainiac, noted that Jeopardy!-related sitcom episodes had become common at the time.

== In popular culture ==
One of the earliest references to this Cheers episode within the Jeopardy! show itself happened just a few months later on the May 18, 1990, airing of the final round of the Jeopardy! College Championship, taped on April 22 for season six. Soon-to-be champion Michael Thayer of Rutgers University bet $0 and wrote "Who was someone I never met?" as his response in Final Jeopardy!. When the contestants' wagers and responses were revealed, Alex Trebek noted the connection with his comment, "Michael, looks like you were watching that episode of Cheers."

The question categories from the first round of the game Cliff Clavin played in ("Civil Servants", "Stamps from Around The World", "Mothers and Sons", "Beer", "Bar Trivia", "Celibacy", described in the episode by Woody Boyd (Woody Harrelson) as "Mr. Clavin's Dream Board") were used as categories in the Double Jeopardy! round of a Jeopardy! game played on May 10, 2005, during the 2005 Ultimate Tournament of Champions.

On the first episode of Jeopardy! season 31, which aired on September 15, 2014, Jeopardy! champion Elizabeth Williams echoed Cliff Clavin's answer in her response to the Final Jeopardy! clue. Williams's $600 wager combined with her opponents' incorrect responses allowed Williams to triumph that day, nonetheless. On the episode aired January 22, 2026, Celebrity Jeopardy! champion and season 42 Tournament of Champions participant W. Kamau Bell partially wrote Clavin's answer as his response to the Final Jeopardy! clue.

The episode inspired the term "Clavin's Rule" in reference to maximizing all the winnings at the final round and losing them all. Trebek himself "ma[de] several references to contestants pulling 'a Cliff Clavin'" since the episode originally aired. Cameron Martin of The Atlantic magazine, Ashley Burns of Uproxx Tim Graham of ESPN blog, and Christopher Hair of an SBNation blog Five for Howling have also used the phrase "pull a Cliff Clavin," coined as a "practice".

== See also ==
- List of Cheers episodes

== Notes ==
=== References ===
- Razeghi, Andrew (2006). Hope: How Triumphant Leaders Create the Future. John Wiley & Sons. ISBN 9780787981266.
- Richmond, Ray (2004). This is Jeopardy!. ISBN 9780760753743.
