= Williams Fork Reservoir =

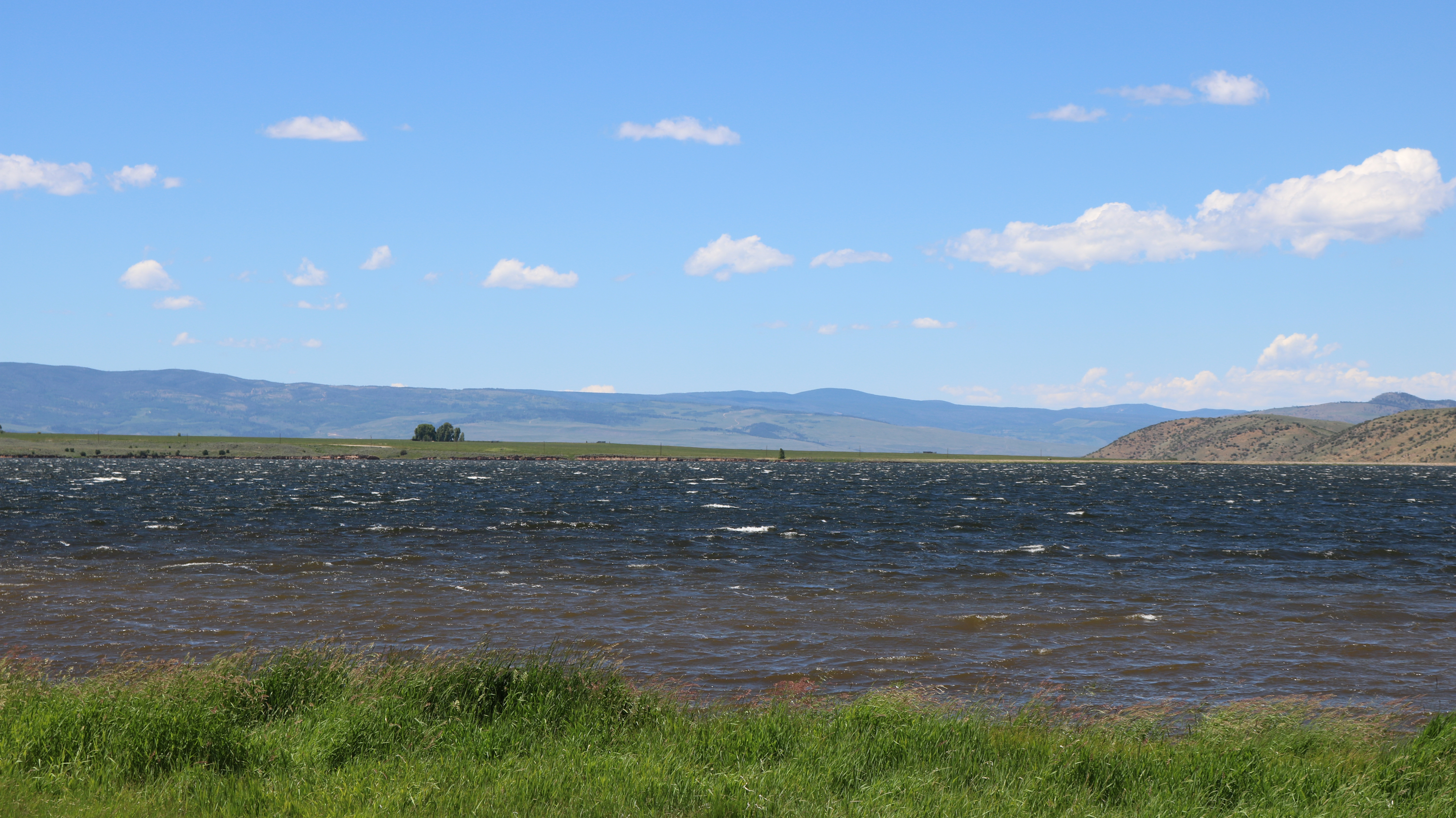
- The reservoir in 2016.

- Location within Colorado Location within the United States
- Location: Grand County, Colorado, United States
- Coordinates: 40°00′55″N 106°12′37″W
- Type: reservoir
- Primary inflows: Williams Fork of the Colorado River
- Primary outflows: Williams Fork of the Colorado River
- Basin countries: United States
- Surface area: 1,860 acres (750 ha)
- Water volume: 97,000 acre⋅ft (120,000,000 m^{3})
- Surface elevation: 7,811 ft (2,381 m)

Williams Fork Reservoir, located near the town of Parshall in Grand County, Colorado, is owned and operated by Denver Water. The reservoir impounds the Williams Fork of the Colorado River.

== Geography ==
When the reservoir is full, its elevation is 7,811 feet (2,381 m). With a 15.8 miles (25.4 km) shoreline, the reservoir's surface area is 1,860 acres (750 ha).

== Williams Fork Dam and Power Plant ==
The Williams Fork Dam and Power Plant, completed in 1938 and expanded in 1959, provides electricity and water to the Western Slope or Denver metropolitan area in Colorado. It's a concrete dam, 217 feet (66 m) high and with a length of 600 feet (180 m) at its crest. The reservoir impounds about 97,000 acre-feet (120,000,000 m^{3}) of water (one acre foot=325,851 gallons), and the power plant contains a 3,158-kilowatt generator.

== Recreactional Activities ==
Water based activities include motor boating, fishing, ice fishing and wind surfing. The lake is stocked for fishing by Colorado Parks and Wildlife. Tent, trailer and recreational vehicle (RV) camping and picnic sites are available.

== See also ==
- List of largest reservoirs of Colorado
- Phillips-Williams Fork Reservoir Site
- Williams Fork (Colorado River)
- List of reservoirs in Colorado
