= Phillips-Williams Fork Reservoir Site =

Paleoindian archaeological site in Colorado

The Phillips-Williams Fork Reservoir site (5GA1955) is a Paleoindian site located on the shore of the Williams Fork Reservoir, about 20 kilometers (12 mi) southeast of Kremmling at an elevation of 2400 m (7874 ft.) in Grand County, Colorado, near the center of Middle Park.

Projectile points were found on the site from the James Allen complex (generally 9350 – 7900 before present) and Goshen / Plainview (generally 11,000 before present).

== Geography ==
The Phillips-William site sits on a terrace between the Colorado River and the Williams Fork Tributary. The area surrounding the intersection of these two drainages maintains a relatively flat slope for 5–10 miles in every direction until the terraces intersect the Front Range to the east, the Rabbit Ears Range to the North and the Gore Range to the southwest.

== History ==
=== Discovery ===
The Phillips-Williams Fork Reservoir Site was discovered and collected over a five-year period by Ralph and Ruth Phillips, husband and wife. No excavations have been conducted at the site and all specimens are reported as being recovered during surface collection.

=== Artifacts ===
The Phillips-Williams Fork Reservoir site assemblage is dominated by James Allen projectile points although two specimens resembling the Goshen/Plainview type were also recovered. Despite the presence of parallel-oblique flaking, some of the points reflect morphological variability that does not allow a quick assignment to the James Allen category. Wiesend and Frison (1998:19) refer to these points as falling within the “grey area” of the James Allen type classification. Despite variations among the 30 specimens, metric analyses showed that the specimens were indeed of the James Allen and Goshen/Plainview types.

The single publication on the Phillips-Williams Fork Reservoir site assemblage reports 28 projectile points of the James Allen variety and 2 projectile points of the Goshen/Plainview variety. Currently, there is no information about other recovered tool forms or debitage from the site.

Relative dates for both categories have been established using radiocarbon dates from sites with similar assemblages from Colorado, Wyoming, Kansas, Montana, and elsewhere. These dates are 9350 – 7900 radiocarbon years for Jimmy Allen (Pitblado 2003) and 11,000 radiocarbon years for Goshen/Plainview (Frison 1991).

No faunal remains have been reported for this site.

=== Historical significance ===
The Phillips-Williams Fork Reservoir site provides archaeologists with the opportunity to assess the extent to which James Allen (and perhaps earlier) groups were utilizing mountain settings during the early Holocene period. When compared to other, similar sites in Colorado, the frequency of points in the Phillips-Williams Fork Reservoir site assemblage is most similar to assemblages from large, communal bison kills in the eastern portions of the state. The absence of evidence for a bison (or other species) kill site and the low occurrence of impact fractures (a common result of point use in hunting) on points raises questions about the nature of the collection. The presence of bend breaks (breaks causing during manufacture) indicates the site may have acted as some sort of temporary camp. The additional presence of Goshen/Plainview points at the Phillips-Williams Fork Reservoir is important as it indicates that the site was either multi-component, that individuals were finding and reusing older projectile points, or that the Goshen/Plainview form may have continued or been adopted by flintknappers of later periods.

== See also ==
- List of prehistoric sites in Colorado
