= Henderson Mine =

USA molybdenum mine

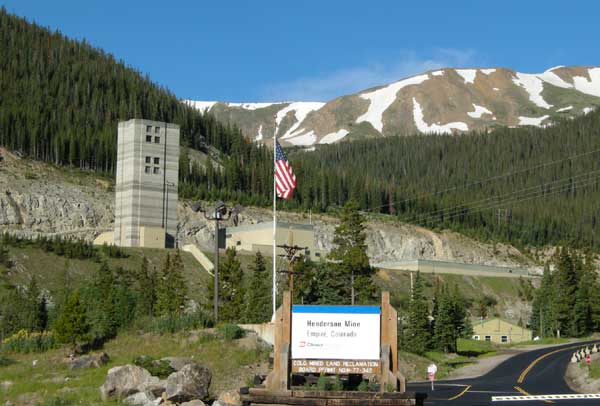
The Henderson Mine is just east of the snow-capped continental divide, which appears in the background (photo taken in mid-July, 2009)

The Henderson Mine is a large underground molybdenum mine west of the town of Empire in Clear Creek County, Colorado, USA. The Henderson mine, which has produced molybdenum since 1976, is owned by Freeport-McMoRan.

The mine is North America's largest producer of primary molybdenum. 2007 production was 40 million pounds of molybdenum, with a value of $1.1 billion. As of 2026 the mine has the capacity to produce approximately 18 million pounds of molybdenum per year.

== History ==
The Henderson mine is near the Urad mine, which produced molybdenum from 1914 to the 1960s, before exhausting its orebody. Owner Climax Molybdenum Company recognized the potential for deeper orebodies in the area, and discovered the Henderson deposit in 1964. The mine was named after mining engineer Robert Henderson.

Production began in 1976; on Jan. 4, 2010, workers mined the billionth pound of molybdenum. In 2006, remaining ore reserves were estimated to be 500 million pounds of recoverable molybdenum.

The Henderson mine was considered by the National Science Foundation as one of the two final candidates for the Deep Underground Science and Engineering Laboratory, but lost to the Homestake Mine in South Dakota.

== Geology ==
The deposit is a porphyry-type deposit consisting of a stockwork of small veins of molybdenite in rhyolite porphyries of Tertiary age that intrude into Precambrian Silver Plume granite. The ore averages 0.2% molybdenum. The molybdenite is associated with pyrite and quartz. The deposit is similar to other porphyry molybdenum deposits such as the Climax mine in Colorado and the Questa mine in New Mexico.

The Henderson deposit is located in the Colorado Mineral Belt, a northeast–southwest alignment of metal deposits that crosses the mountainous part of Colorado from Boulder to Durango.

== Mining ==
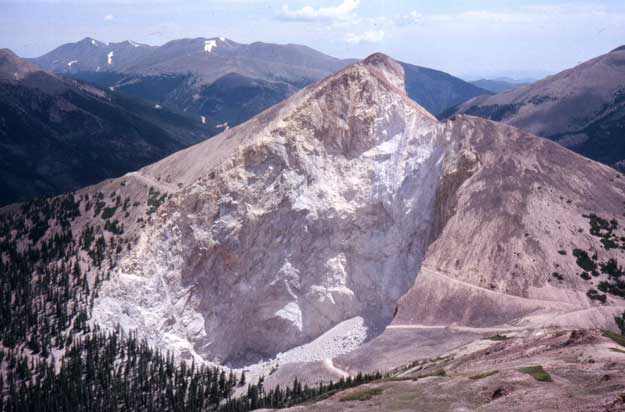
The Henderson mine glory hole, 1989.

Mining is done by block caving. In 1980 the cavity produced by the panel caving broke through to the surface, producing a large glory hole (subsidence) on the side of Red Mountain.

The ore is carried by a 15-mile (24 km) conveyor belt system extending through a 10-mile (16 km) tunnel beneath the Continental Divide and then five miles (8 km) overland to the ore processing mill near Parshall, Colorado. The ore is treated by froth flotation to obtain molybdenite concentrate, which is shipped to a plant in Fort Madison, Iowa for further processing.

Prior to August 1999, ore was hauled on a 3 ft 6 in (1,067 mm) narrow gauge railroad, double-tracked and electrified at 1,400 V DC, except in the ore loading area, where 600 V DC was used. 4-wheel locomotives weighing 55–62 short tons (49–55 long tons; 50–56 metric tons) hauled trains of 4-wheel 20-short-ton (17.9-long-ton; 18.1-metric-ton) ore cars. A typical train of 20 to 25 cars required 3 locomotives, two pulling and one pushing up the long 3-percent grade in the haulage tunnel. After 1996, train operation was fully automated. Rail haulage was abandoned when the ore above the rail level in the mine was exhausted. The new working level of the mine, 400 feet (122 m) below the rail level, required a conveyor to lift the ore to the haulage tunnel, and it was eventually decided to extend this conveyor the full distance to the mill. Within the tunnel, one of the two tracks remains available for maintenance access.

== Location ==
The Henderson mine is located at 39°46′13″N 105°50′00″W at an elevation of about 10,300 feet, about 1.6 miles east of the Continental Divide. It is approximately 9 miles west of Empire, Colorado.

The haulage tunnel portal is located at 39°47′47.91″N 106°1′25.32″W.

The mill is located at 39°50′45.06″N 106°4′45.01″W.

== Outdoor recreation ==
The Henderson mine is on private land. However, the mine is surrounded by US Forest Service land of the Arapaho National Forest. There is a public parking lot on the Jones Pass Road near the mine, and the National Forest land near the mine is popular year-round for hiking, cross-country skiing, and snowshoeing.

== See also ==
- List of molybdenum mines
- Molybdenum mining in the United States
