= Thompson Creek Metals =

Full cycle mining company in North America

Thompson Creek Metals Company Inc.
- Type: Public
- Traded as: TSX: TCM; NYSE: TC
- Industry: Mining
- Founded: 2006
- Defunct: 2016
- Fate: Acquired by Centerra Gold
- Headquarters: Denver, CO, United States
- Key people: JacquesPerron, Pres, CEO, Dir; PamelaL.Saxton, Exec.VP, CFO; Mark Wilson, Exec.VP, CCO; Wendy Cassity, VP, GC, Sec. Geoff Ramey, VP, HR; Ian Berzins, VP, GM(MMM); Robert Dorfler, VP, GM(LMF); Chris Gibbs, VP, GM(EM); John Hollow, VP Tech.Ser. Greg Hurless, GM(TCM); Timothy J. Haddon, Dir; Denis C. Arsenault, Dir; Carol T. Banducci, Dir; James L. Freer, Dir; James P. Geyer, Dir; Anne Giardini, Dir
- Products: Cu, Au, Mo,
- Revenue: US$807 million (2014)▲
- Operating income: US$36 million (2014)▲
- Net income: US$(124 million) (2014)▼
- Total assets: US$2.8 billion (2014)▲
- Total equity: US$888 million (2014)▲
- Website: www.thompsoncreekmetals.com

Thompson Creek Metals Company Inc. was a full cycle mining company with acquisition, exploration, development, and operation in North America. The corporate office was located in Denver, Colorado. The company primarily produced copper, gold, and molybdenum. Over its history, the Company evolved from being a major primary molybdenum producer to becoming a copper and gold mining company with the construction and development of the Mount Milligan (open-pit copper-gold) mine and concentrator in British Columbia, Canada. Mount Milligan was Thompson Creek Metals principal operation and the company owned 100% of this property. The company also owned 100% of its Thompson Creek Mine (open-pit molybdenum and concentrator) in Idaho. Thompson Creek Metals owned 75% joint venture interest in two other properties, including its Endako Mine (open-pit molybdenum, concentrator and roaster) in British Columbia, and its Langeloth Metallurgical Facility (roaster) in Pennsylvania. Thompson Creek Metals had additional development projects, including the Berg property in British Columbia (exploration of copper, molybdenum, and silver).

In 2016, Thompson Creek was acquired by Centerra Gold for $1.1 billion. The deal took place because of Thompson Creek's substantial debt incurred to develop their Mount Milligan mine.

== History ==
In 2006, the privately held Thompson Creek Metals Company (USA) was acquired by Canadian-based, publicly traded mining company Blue Pearl Mining Ltd for US$575 million, in addition to other payments worth as much as US$125 million depending on the price of molybdenum. The name Blue Pearl Mining Ltd was changed to Thompson Creek Metals Company Inc. in May 2007. From October 2006 through August 2013, Thompson Creek Metals was solely a molybdenum producer.

Pursuant to the acquisition of Terrane Metals Corp. in October 2010 for about US$700 million in a combination of cash and common stock, the company diversified its assets by adding significant reserves of copper and gold. Concurrent with the acquisition of Terrane, the Company entered into a Gold Stream Arrangement with Royal Gold Inc. as a financing mechanism for the purchase of Terrane. The Gold Stream Agreement was amended twice for a total payment by Royal Gold of approximately US$781 million for the right to purchase 52.25% of the gold from Mount Milligan Mine for US$435 per ounce for the life of the mine.

== Operating Mines ==
Mount Milligan — Mount Milligan Mine (open-pit copper and gold mine) is located 90 miles northwest of Prince George in Central British Columbia, Canada. Mount Milligan Mine has a concentrator with a 60,000 tpd design capacity copper flotation processing plant. The estimated life of Mount Milligan Mine is approximately 24 years (which is based on spot metal prices copper and gold). Over the life of the mine, it is estimated that it will produce an average annual of 85 million pounds of copper and 186,700 ounces of gold in 155,000 tonnes of concentrate. In 2015 through 2019, the average annual production is projected to increase at approximately 94 million pounds of copper and 285,800 ounces of gold in 165,000 tonnes of concentrate. Thompson Creek Metals Company filed an updated NI 43-101 Technical Report for Mount Milligan Mine on January 21, 2015 that confirms these projections.

In October 2010, through the Terrane acquisition, Thompson Creek Metals obtained the Mount Milligan development project and initiated construction soon after. On August 15, 2013, the initial feed to the concentrator started the operation of the mine. By September 2013, the mine had its first production, a copper-gold concentrate. Mount Milligan Mine reached commercial production as of February 18, 2014, which means that the mill operated at 60% planned capacity throughput for 30 days. Industrious activities were sustained through 2014 and are consistent today. The Company predicts that it will reach 60,000 tpd on a steady basis once it installs a secondary crushing circuit. Thompson Creek Metals expects to reach approximately 60,000 tpd by the end of 2015 by utilizing temporary crushing.

Thompson Creek Mine (near Challis, Idaho) — The Thompson Creek Mine is a primary molybdenum mine located approximately 35 miles southwest of Challis in Idaho's Custer County, a historic mining area. Known as the Thompson Creek deposit, it was discovered in 1968 by Cyprus Minerals Corporation. The mine has been in operation since 1983 and uses conventional open-pit mining methods. The mine was sold in 1993 to Thompson Creek Metals Company (USA), which began mining at the site in April 1994. The company has claims on over 22,000 acres of land (includes waste dumps). It operates as an open pit mine, and includes Bruno Creek Tailings Impoundment, the second tallest center-line tailings dam in the world. The capacity of the mill to process is approximately 30,000 tons of ore per day to produce molybdenum sulfide concentrate. It is then roasted at the Company’s Langeloth Metallurgical Facility into molybdenum trioxide, ferromolybdenum products, and other specialty products. Due to low molybdenum prices, this mine is under maintenance and care currently.

Endako Mine — 3 pit, open pit mine in central British Columbia (other 2 projects Berg and Davidson are west of it). Subsidiary Thompson Creek Holding owns 75% of the mine while Japanese company Sojitz Corporation has the other 25%. The operation also involves processing the molybdenum ore into a disulfide and then molybdenum trioxide through roasting. Expansion projects, which began in 2008 increased capacity by 77.4% (though expansions which include new mills will cut the mine life by 38.5% to 16 years).

Langeloth Metallurgical Facility — The Langeloth Metallurgical Facility, located 25 miles west of Pittsburgh, Pennsylvania, is a world-class facility with a long history of producing high-quality metallurgical products used mainly in the steel and chemical industries. The facility has roasting capacity of 35 million pounds of molybdenum per year. Four multiple-hearth furnaces are used for the conversion (roasting) of molybdenum disulfide concentrates into technical grade molybdenum oxide (tech oxide), which is sold in powder form or briquettes or converted into pure molybdenum oxide or ferromolybdenum. Two other furnaces process spent catalyst material containing other metals.

== Projects ==
As part of the Terrane acquisition, Thompson Creek also acquired a copper, molybdenum and silver exploration property located in British Columbia, Canada (the Berg Property).

Berg Property — Located about 50 miles southwest of Houston, BC and 15 miles northwest of Huckleberry Mine, this project is continuously assessed to determine if the deposit of copper, molybdenum, and silver is commercially ready for production. The Berg property is 100% owned by the company. Royal Gold has 1% net smelter return royalty held on eight of the mineral claims and one mining lease, including those which host the deposit on the Berg property. All mineral claims and the mining lease are in good standing and good to dates ranging from August 2015 to November 2021. Mineral claims are subject to exploration expenditure obligations, or they may choose to pay annual fees to the province in lieu of exploration expenditures. Thompson Creek expects to renew such mineral claims and mining lease in the ordinary course.
