= Thompson Creek mine =

Molybdenum mine in Idaho

- Interactive map of Thompson Creek mine
- Location: Custer County, Idaho, United States; 44°18′58″N 114°33′06″W
- Products: Molybdenum

The Thompson Creek mine is one of the largest molybdenum mines in the United States. The mine is located in northern United States in Idaho. The Thompson Creek mine has reserves amounting to 205 million tonnes of molybdenum ore grading 0.06% molybdenum thus resulting 123,000 tonnes of molybdenum.

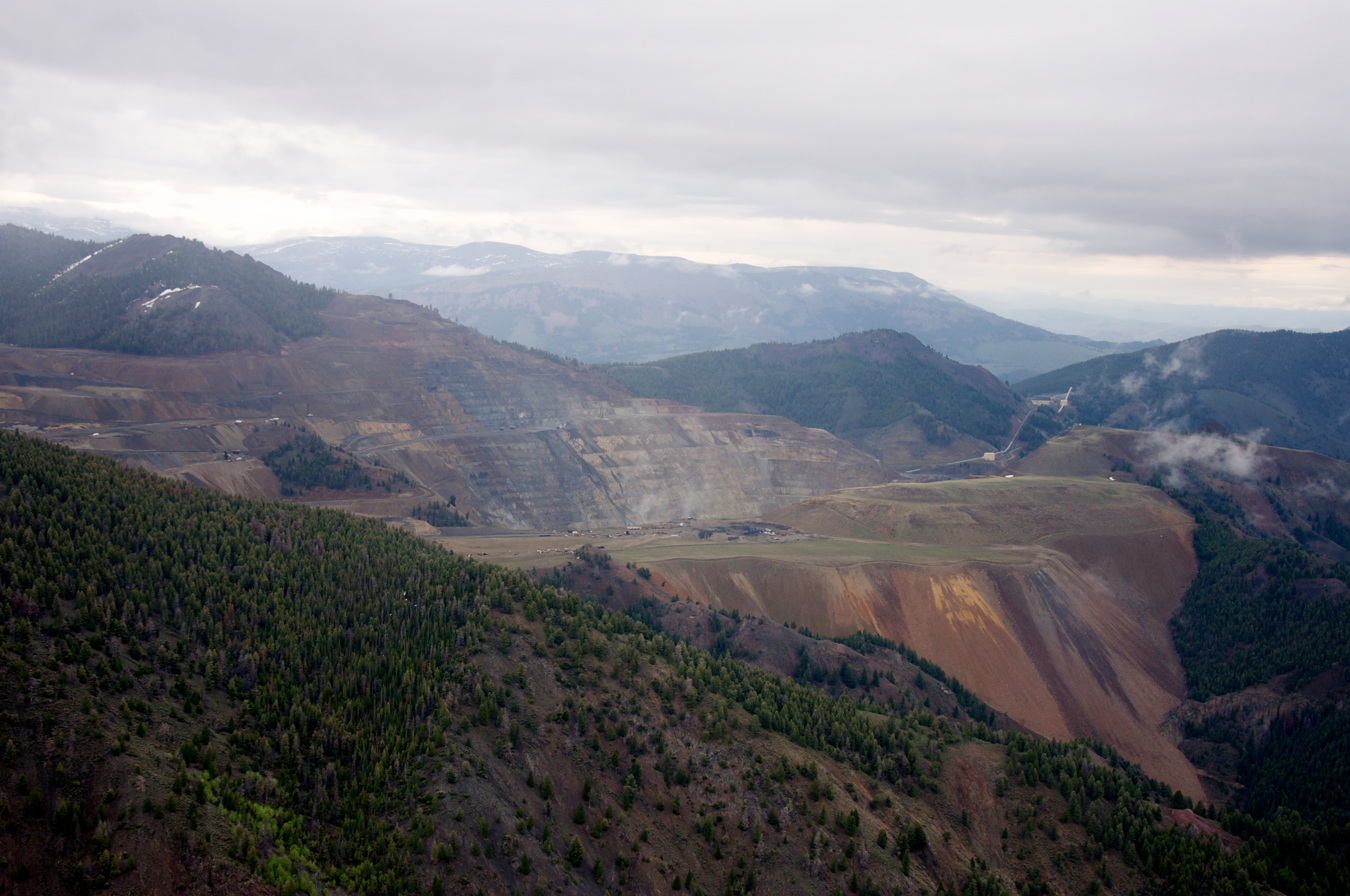
Thompson Creek Mine, Idaho.

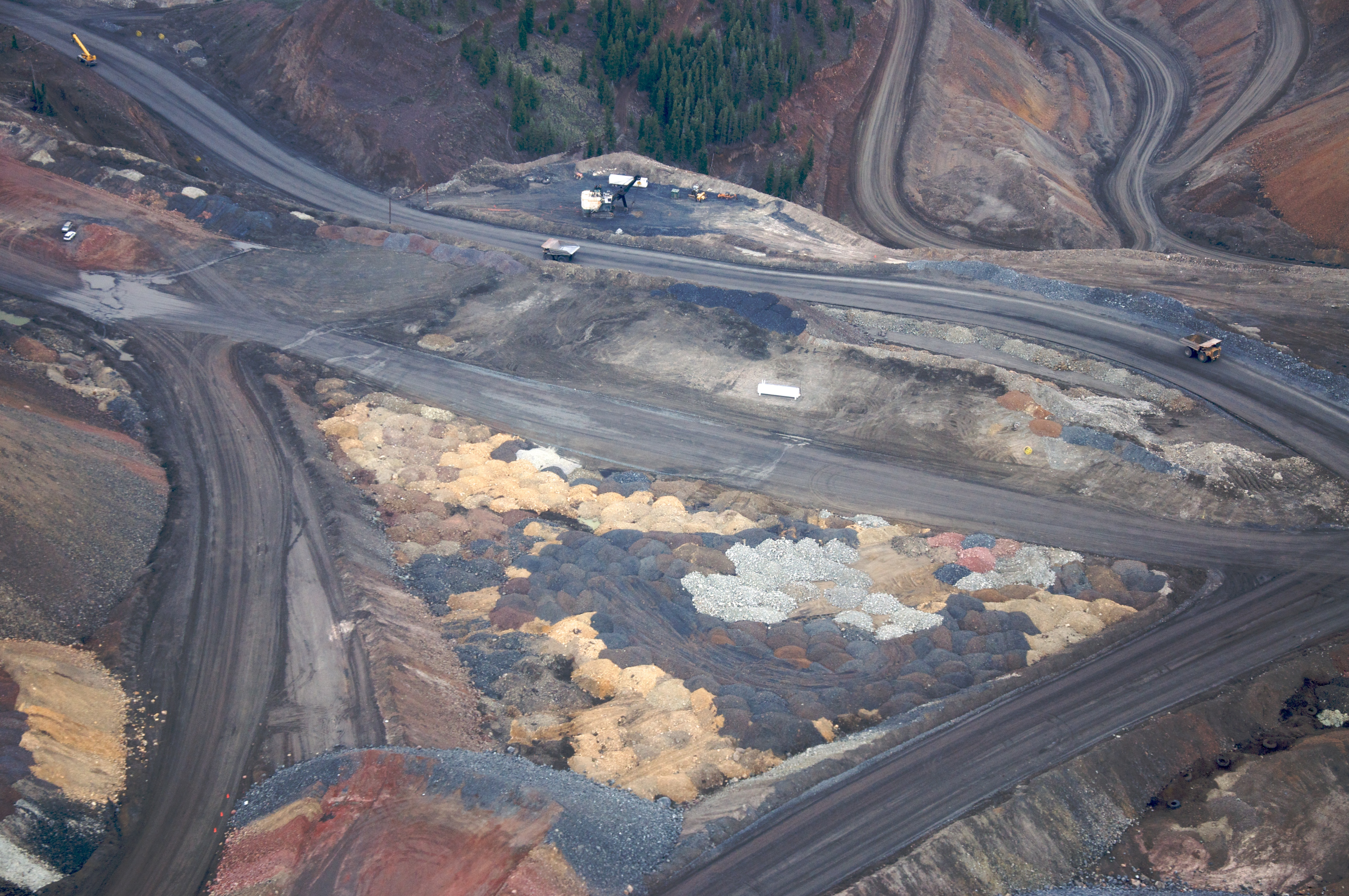
The Thompson Creek molybdenum mine in Western US.

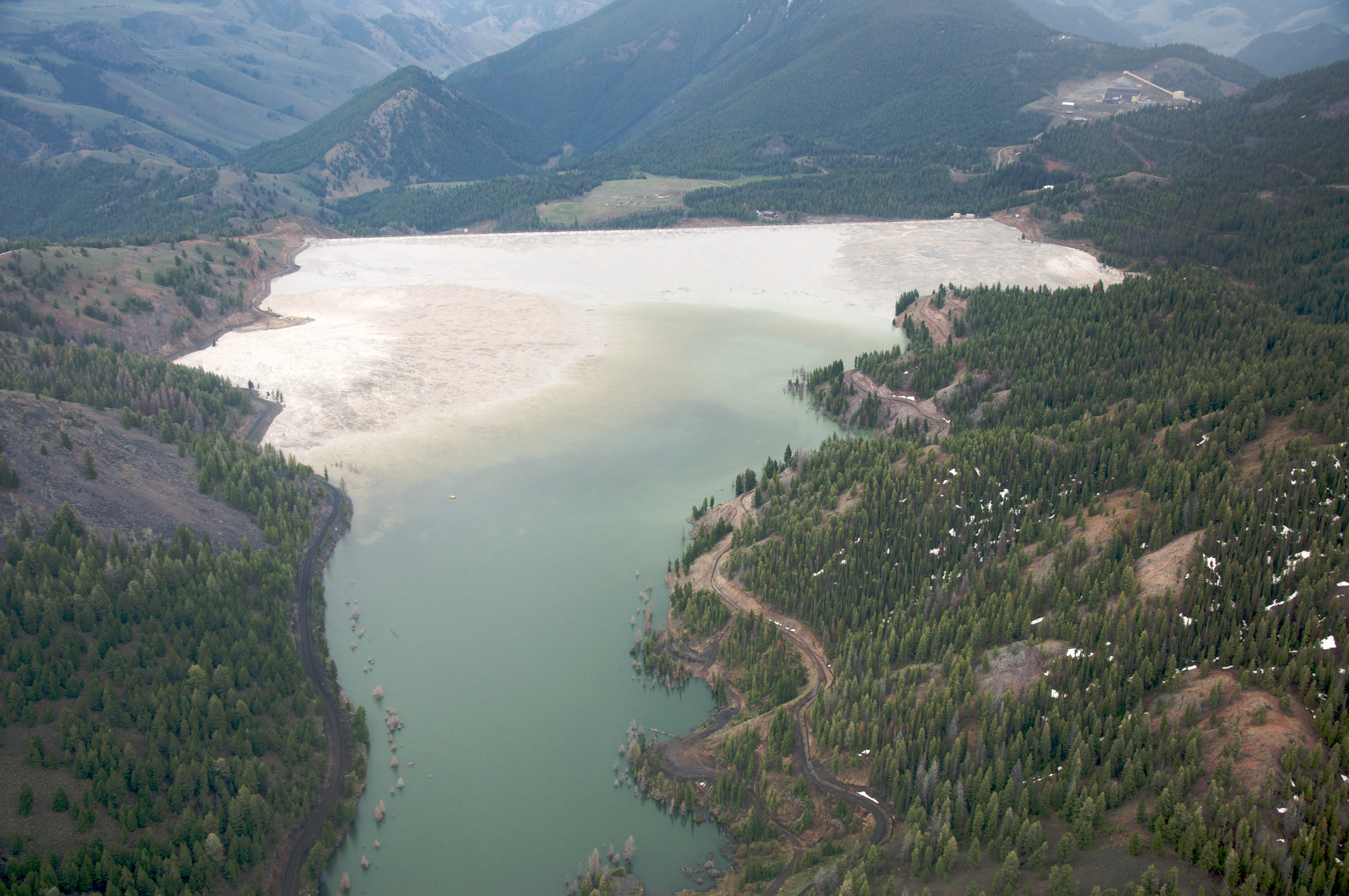
Thompson Creek Mine tailing pond in Salmon-Challis National Forest.

== See also ==
- List of molybdenum mines
- Molybdenum mining in the United States
