= Williams Fork (Colorado River tributary) =

Coordinates: 40°03′23″N 106°10′48″W

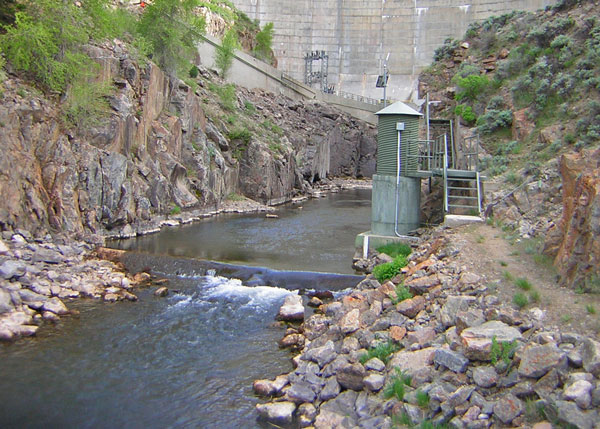

Physical characteristics
- Mouth
  - location: Confluence with Colorado
  - elevation: 7,480 ft (2,280 m)
- Length: 34 mi (55 km)

Basin features
- Progression: Colorado

The Williams Fork is a tributary of the Colorado River, approximately 33.8 miles (54.4 km) long, in north central Colorado in the United States. It flows through Grand County between the valleys of the Fraser River and the Blue River. It rises at the juncture of McQueary and Bobtail creeks just west of the Continental Divide 8 miles (13 km) west of Berthoud Pass and 7 miles (11 km) north of the Eisenhower Tunnel in the Arapaho National Forest. It flows north-northwest to the Williams Fork Reservoir, then turns northeast and joins the Colorado at Parshall.

== See also ==
- List of rivers of Colorado
- List of tributaries of the Colorado River
