= Lucky Jack mine =

Mine in Colorado, United States of America

- Interactive map of Lucky Jack mine
- Location: Colorado, United States
- Products: Molybdenum

38°52′N 107°02′W

The Lucky Jack mine (formerly known as the Mount Emmons molybdenum property) is one of the largest molybdenum deposits in the United States. The mine is located West of Crested Butte, Colorado in Gunnison County, Colorado. The Lucky Jack deposit has reserves amounting to 220 million tonnes of molybdenum ore grading 0.366% molybdenum disulfide (0.22% molybdenum) thus resulting 484,000 tonnes of molybdenum.

== History ==
The unmined deposit was reported to be in the planning stage in 2007 with interests in the project from both U.S. Energy Corporation and Kobex Minerals Inc. The deposit was originally discovered in 1970s.

The Denver Post reported grassroots environmental groups, like the High County Citizens' Alliance and the Red Lady Coalition, actively opposing the planned work as of 2007. The groups pointed at expensive and poor cleanup attempts for similar mines in the area, one of which was listed as a Superfund site: Standard Mine.

In February 2016, a subsidiary of Freeport-McMoRan purchased the claim from U.S. Energy. This news was well received by the town and activist groups, because the new owners were willing to enter a cooperative MOU with both the local town and state and federal environmental regulators on care of the mine.

== See also ==
- List of molybdenum mines
