= Bauxite mining in the United States =

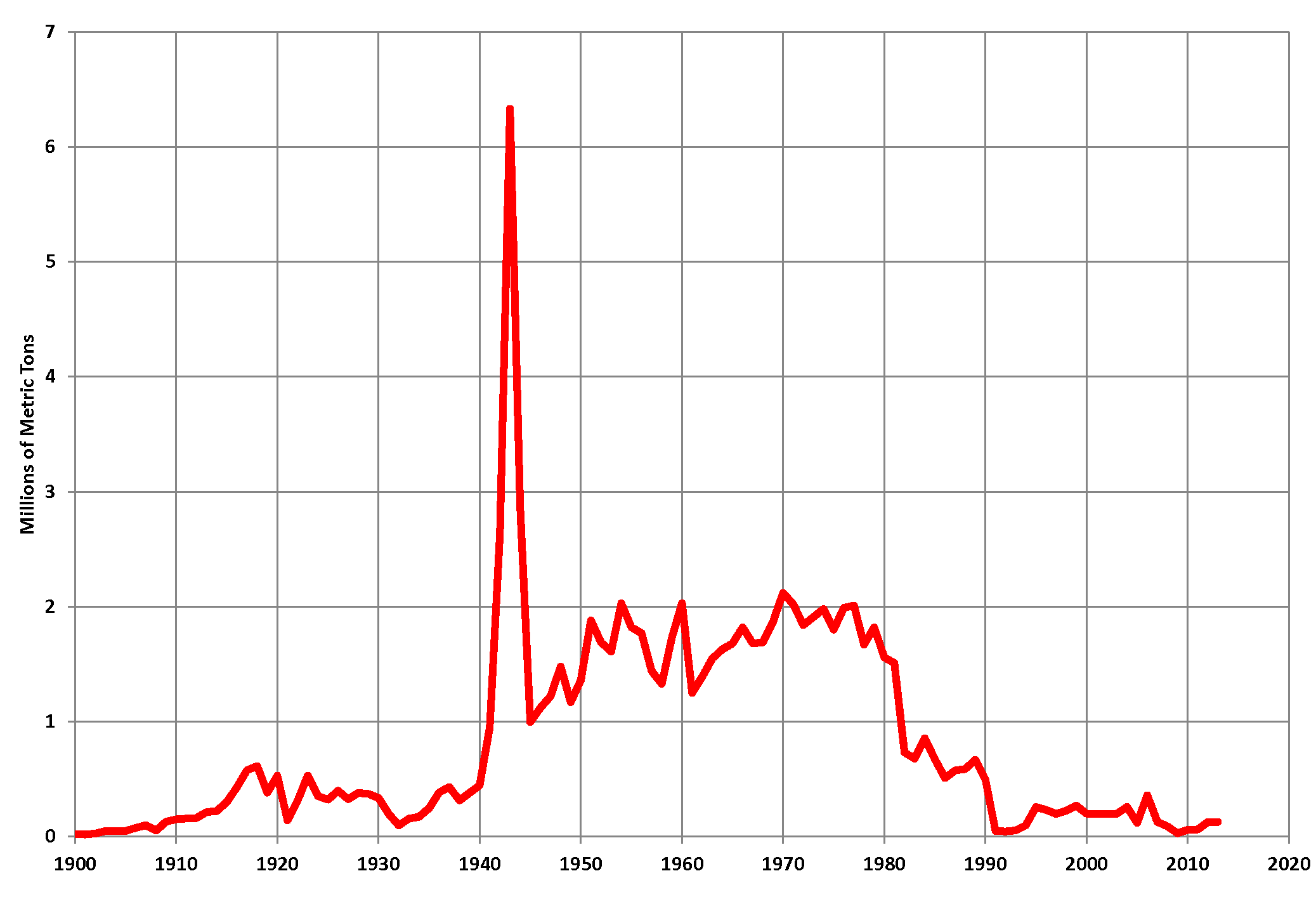
Annual production of bauxite in the United States, 1900-2013

Bauxite mining in the United States produced an estimated 128,000 metric tonnes of bauxite in 2013. Although the United States was an important source of bauxite in the early 20th century, it now supplies less than one percent of world bauxite production.

== Uses ==
Bauxite is the only commercial ore of aluminium, and 96 percent of bauxite consumed in the US is used to produce aluminum (metallurgical grade). However, since 1981, none of the bauxite mined in the US has been used to make metallic aluminium. US bauxite is instead used for abrasives, high-temperature refractory materials, and as a high-strength proppant for hydraulic fracturing of oil and gas wells.

== History ==
The American bauxite industry held world importance during World War I, and from 1914 through 1920, supplied more than half the world's bauxite. In 1914 and again in 1915, the US supplied 94 percent of the world's bauxite.

Wartime aluminum demand for airplane construction during World War II caused bauxite production to jump more than 16-fold from 1939 to 1943. In 1943, US bauxite production peaked at 6.3 million tons, then fell back to 1.0 million tons in 1945. The US has supplied less than ten percent of world bauxite each year since 1956, and less than one percent each year since 1982.

From 1889 through 2013, a total of 94 million metric tons of bauxite were mined in the US, about 90 percent of which came from central Arkansas.

In 2013 the US mined 128,000 metric tons of bauxite.

Past and Present Bauxite Mining Areas in the US

== Deposits ==
Bauxite forms by the weathering of aluminum-rich and silica-poor rocks in hot, humid, climates, at places with good drainage. Under the proper conditions, weathering disintegrates the aluminium silicate minerals, and dissolves and removes the silica, creating bauxite. The mined US bauxite deposits have all been in the southeastern United States.

=== Arkansas ===
About 90 percent of American-mined bauxite has come from deposits in central Arkansas. The Arkansas deposits were formed during the Eocene from weathering of intrusions of nepheline syenite, an aluminium-rich, silicate-poor, igneous rock.

Bauxite is still mined in Arkansas, but has not been mined for aluminium production since 1981. Alcoa operates a processing plant near Benton, Arkansas, which produces a high-strength proppant used in hydraulic fracturing of oil and gas wells. The bauxite is mined by McGeorge Contractors.

=== Eufaula, Alabama ===
Bauxite has been mined near Eufaula, Alabama since 1927. In 2007, 142 thousand short tons were mined, for use in chemical manufacture, abrasives, and high-temperature refractory materials.

=== Andersonville, Georgia ===
Bauxite has been commercially mined in the Andersonville, Georgia district since 1914. Bauxite deposits occur in beds of kaolinite clay in the Nanafalia formation of the Wilcox group, of Eocene age. Mining of bauxite and kaolinite is currently being done by Mullite Company of America (Mulcoa).

=== Spottswood, Virginia ===
Bauxite was mined at two mines near Spottswood, Virginia, from 1940 to 1946. Total production was about 30,000 long tons, from deposits associated with limestone.

== See also ==
Aluminum industry in the United States
