= 75 Chestnut =

Restaurant in Boston, Massachusetts, U.S.

- Interactive map of 75 Chestnut

Restaurant information
- Established: 1997 (29 years ago)
- Owner: Hampshire House Corporation
- Head chef: Markus Ripperger
- Dress code: Business casual or casual
- Location: 75 Chestnut Street, Beacon Hill, Boston, Suffolk County, Massachusetts, 02108, United States
- Coordinates: 42.3569°N 71.0709°W
- Seating capacity: 85
- Reservations: Yes
- Website: 75chestnut.com

75 Chestnut is a restaurant in the Beacon Hill neighborhood of downtown Boston, Massachusetts, United States. Situated at 75 Chestnut Street, two blocks west of Charles Street, it was established on October 9, 1997. It is a sister restaurant of Cheers Beacon Hill, 75 on Liberty Wharf and Hampshire House.

The restaurant is owned by Tom Kershaw's Hampshire House Corporation, and its head chef is Markus Ripperger. Ripperger is also chief executive officer of Hampshire House Corporation.

Boston Magazine awarded 75 Chestnut its "Best Beacon Hill Restaurant" award in 2013.

In the first quarter of the 20th century, the building was the home of plumber William N. McKenna, who was also lieutenant and second in command of the Ancient and Honorable Artillery Company. In 1927, it was occupied by John P. Goudy's upholstering business. By 1930, it was the Beaver School, a nursery school group under the directorship of Dorothy C. Fay.
