= Cheers =

American television sitcom (1982–1993)

- Genre: Sitcom
- Created by: Glen and Les Charles; James Burrows
- Showrunners: Glen and Les Charles; Ken Estin; Sam Simon; David Angell; Peter Casey; David Lee; Bill and Cheri Steinkellner; Phoef Sutton; Tom Anderson; Dan O'Shannon
- Directed by: James Burrows; Various (seasons 6–11)
- Starring: Ted Danson; Shelley Long; Nicholas Colasanto; Rhea Perlman; George Wendt; John Ratzenberger; Kelsey Grammer; Woody Harrelson; Kirstie Alley; Bebe Neuwirth
- Theme music composer: Gary Portnoy; Judy Hart Angelo
- Opening theme: "Where Everybody Knows Your Name" by Gary Portnoy
- Ending theme: "Where Everybody Knows Your Name" (instrumental)
- Composer: Craig Safan
- Country of origin: United States
- Original language: English
- No. of seasons: 11
- No. of episodes: 275 (list of episodes)

Production
- Executive producers: James Burrows; Glen and Les Charles; Bill and Cheri Steinkellner (seasons 9–10); Phoef Sutton (seasons 9–10); Tom Anderson (season 11); Dan O'Shannon (season 11)
- Cinematography: John Finger; Kenneth Peach (first three episodes)
- Camera setup: Film; Multi-camera
- Running time: 21–25 minutes
- Production companies: Charles/Burrows/Charles Productions; Paramount Television

Original release
- Network: NBC
- Release: September 30, 1982 – May 20, 1993

Related
- The Tortellis; Wings; Frasier; Frasier (2023 TV series); Cheers (Spanish TV series)

Cheers is an American television sitcom, created by Glen Charles & Les Charles and James Burrows, aired on NBC for eleven seasons from September 30, 1982, to May 20, 1993. The show was produced by Charles/Burrows/Charles Productions in association with Paramount Television. The show is set in the titular bar in Boston, where a group of locals meet to drink, relax, socialize, and escape from their day-to-day issues.

At the center of the show is the bar's owner and head bartender, Sam Malone, who is a womanizing former relief pitcher for the Boston Red Sox. The show's ensemble cast introduced in the pilot episode are waitresses Diane Chambers and Carla Tortelli, second bartender Coach Ernie Pantusso, and regular customers Norm Peterson and Cliff Clavin. Later main characters of the show include Frasier Crane, Woody Boyd, Lilith Sternin, and Rebecca Howe.

After premiering in 1982, Cheers was nearly canceled during its first season when it ranked almost last in ratings for its premiere (74th out of 77 shows). However, the show eventually became a Nielsen ratings juggernaut in the United States, earning a top-10 rating during eight of its 11 seasons, including one season at number one (season 9). The show spent most of its run on NBC's Thursday night "Must See TV" lineup. Its series finale in 1993 became the most-watched single TV episode of the 1990s, and the show's 275 episodes have been successfully syndicated worldwide. Nominated for Outstanding Comedy Series for all 11 of its seasons on the air, it earned 28 Primetime Emmy Awards from a record of 117 nominations.

During its run, Cheers became one of the most popular series in history and received critical acclaim from its start to its end and is frequently cited as one of the greatest television shows of all time. In 1997, the episodes "Thanksgiving Orphans" and "Home Is the Sailor," aired originally in 1987, were respectively ranked No. 7 and No. 45 on TV Guide's 100 Greatest Episodes of All Time. The show was followed by three spin-offs: The Tortellis, Wings, and Frasier; and a Spanish remake.

== Characters ==
Before the Cheers pilot "Give Me a Ring Sometime" was completed and aired in 1982, the series consisted of four employees (bar owner Sam Malone, bartender Coach Pantusso, and waitresses Carla Tortelli and Diane Chambers) in the first script. Later revisions to the script as filmed added Norm Peterson and Cliff Clavin (regular customers of Cheers) as among the regular characters of the series.

In later years, Woody Boyd replaced Coach, after the character died off-screen in season three (1984–85), following actor Nicholas Colasanto's death. Frasier Crane started as a recurring character in season three and quickly became a permanent addition to the cast. The character of Diane left the show after season five, and in season six (1987–88), new character Rebecca Howe was added. Lilith Sternin started as a one-time character in an episode of season four, "Second Time Around" (1985). After a return appearance in season five, she became a recurring character and was later featured as a permanent character during season 10 (1991–92).

=== Original main characters ===
Cast of seasons one through three, left to right: (top) Shelley Long, Ted Danson; (middle) Rhea Perlman, Nicholas Colasanto; (bottom) George Wendt, John Ratzenberger (Note: Ratzenberger joined the main cast in season two after frequently appearing in his recurring role in season one.)

- Ted Danson as Sam Malone: A bartender and proprietor of Cheers, Sam is also a lothario. Before the series began, he was a baseball relief pitcher for the Boston Red Sox nicknamed "Mayday Malone" until he became an alcoholic, harming his career. He has an on-again, off-again relationship with Diane Chambers, his class opposite, in the first five seasons (1982–1987). During their off-times, Sam has flings with many not-so-bright "sexy women" yet fails to pursue a meaningful relationship. After Diane is written out of the series, he tries to pursue Rebecca Howe, with varying results. At the end of the series, he is still unmarried and faces his sexual addiction with the help of Dr. Robert Sutton's (Gilbert Lewis) group meetings, advised by Frasier.
- Shelley Long as Diane Chambers: A sophisticated graduate student attending Boston University. In the pilot, Diane is abandoned by her fiancé, leaving her without a job, a man or money. Realizing that one of her few practical skills is memorization, which comes in handy when dealing with drink orders, she reluctantly becomes a bartender. Later, she becomes a close friend of Coach and has an on-and-off relationship with bartender Sam Malone, her class opposite. During their off-relationship times, Diane dates men who fit her upper-class ideals, such as Frasier Crane. Diane returns to Cheers while dating Frasier to help cure Sam of his drinking addiction with help from Dr. Crane. Diane's biggest enemy is Carla, who frequently insults her, but Diane's lack of retaliation serves to annoy Carla even more. In 1987, Diane leaves Boston and Sam to pursue a screenwriting career in California. She promises Sam she will return to Boston to marry him but does not do so.
- Nicholas Colasanto as "Coach" Ernie Pantusso: A "borderline senile" co-bartender, widower and retired baseball coach. Coach is also a friend of Sam and a close friend of Diane; he has a daughter, Lisa (Allyce Beasley). Coach listens to people's problems and solves them. However, other people also help resolve his own problems. In 1985, Coach died without explicit explanation, as Colasanto died of a heart attack.
- Rhea Perlman as Carla Tortelli: A "wisecracking, cynical" cocktail waitress, who treats customers badly. When the series premieres, she is the mother of five children by her ex-husband Nick Tortelli (Dan Hedaya). Over the course of the series, she bears three more, the depiction of which incorporated Perlman's real-life pregnancies. All of her children are ill behaved, except Ludlow, whose father is a prominent academic. She flirts with men, including ones who are not flattered by her ways, and believes in superstitions. Later, she marries Eddie LeBec, an ice hockey player, who later becomes a penguin mascot for ice shows. After he dies in an ice show accident by an ice resurfacer, Carla later discovers that Eddie had committed bigamy with another woman, whom he had gotten pregnant. Carla sleeps with Sam's enemy, John Allen Hill, to Sam's annoyance and anger.
- George Wendt as Norm Peterson: A bar regular and occasionally employed accountant. A recurrent joke on the show, especially in the earlier seasons, is that the character was such a popular and constant fixture at the bar that anytime he entered through the front door, everyone present would yell out his name ("NORM!") in greeting (when present in the scene Diane would be heard saying "Norman!" moments later); usually, this cry would be followed by one of the present bartenders asking Norm how he was, usually receiving a sardonic response and a request for a beer. ("It's a dog-eat-dog world, and I'm wearing Milkbone underwear.") He has infrequent accounting jobs and a troubled marriage with (but is still in love with and married to) Vera, an unseen character, though she is occasionally heard. Later in the series, he becomes a house painter and an interior decorator. Even later in the series, Norm secures his dream job, tasting beer at a brewery. The character was not originally intended to be a main cast role; Wendt auditioned for a minor role of George for the pilot episode. The role was only to be Diane Chambers' first customer and had only one word: "Beer!" After he was cast in a more permanent role, the character was renamed Norm.

=== Subsequent main characters ===
- John Ratzenberger as Cliff Clavin:
  A know-it-all bar regular and mail carrier. He lives with his mother Esther Clavin (Frances Sternhagen) in first the family house and later his own apartment. In the bar, Cliff continuously spouts nonsensical and annoying trivia, making him an object of derision for the bar patrons (especially Carla). Ratzenberger auditioned for the role of a minor character George, but it went to Wendt, evolving the role into Norm Peterson. The producers decided they wanted a resident bar know-it-all, so the US Postal Worker Cliff Clavin was added for the pilot, as a recurring character for the first season before becoming a main character starting with the second. Originally written as a security guard, the producers changed his occupation into a mail carrier as they thought such a man would have a wider array of knowledge.
- Kelsey Grammer as Frasier Crane:
  A psychiatrist and bar regular, a recurring character for seasons 3 and 4 who joins the main cast by season 5. Frasier started out as Diane Chambers' love interest in the third season (1984–85). In the fourth season (1985–86), after Diane jilts him at the altar in Europe, Frasier starts to frequent Cheers and becomes a regular. He later marries Lilith Sternin and has a son, Frederick. After the series ends, the character becomes the focus of the spin-off Frasier, in which he is divorced from Lilith and living in Seattle.
- Woody Harrelson as Woody Boyd:
  A not-so-bright bartender, first appearing in season 4. He arrives from his Midwest hometown of Hanover, Indiana to Boston, to see Coach, his "pen pal" (as referring to exchanging "pens", not letters). When Sam tells Woody that Coach died, Sam hires Woody in Coach's place. Later, he marries his girlfriend Kelly Gaines (Jackie Swanson), also not-so-bright but raised in a rich family. In the final season, he runs for city council and, surprisingly, wins.
- Bebe Neuwirth as Lilith Sternin:
  A psychiatrist and bar regular, a recurring character until joining the main cast in season 10. She is often teased by bar patrons about her uptight personality and appearance. In "Second Time Around" (1986), her first and only episode of the fourth season, her date with Frasier does not go well because they constantly argue. In the fifth season, with help from Diane, Lilith and Frasier begin a relationship. Eventually, they marry and have a son, Frederick. In the eleventh and final season, she commits adultery and leaves Frasier to live with another man in an experimental underground environment called the "Eco-pod". She breaks it off, returns later in the season and reconciles with Frasier. However, in the spin-off Frasier, the couple has divorced, with Lilith maintaining custody of Frederick. In season 11 of Cheers, Bebe Neuwirth is given "starring" credit only when she appears.
- Kirstie Alley as Rebecca Howe:
  First appearing in season 6, she starts out as a strong independent woman, manager of the bar for the corporation that buys Cheers from Sam after his on-off relationship with Diane ends. When Sam regains ownership, she begs him to let her remain, first as a cocktail waitress and later as a manager. She has repeated romantic failures with mainly rich men and becomes more and more "neurotic, insecure, and sexually frustrated". At the start, Sam frequently attempts to seduce Rebecca without success. As her personality changes, he loses interest in her. In the series finale, after failed relationships with rich men, Rebecca marries a plumber and quits working for the bar. In the Frasier episode "The Show Where Sam Shows Up", she is revealed to be divorced and back at the bar. When Frasier asks whether this means that she is working there again, Sam says, "No, she's just back at the bar."

=== Character table ===
Character	Actress/Actor	Seasons										
Character	Actress/Actor	1	2	3	4	5	6	7	8	9	10	11
Sam Malone	Ted Danson	Main	Main	Main	Main	Main	Main	Main	Main	Main	Main	Main
Carla Tortelli	Rhea Perlman	Main	Main	Main	Main	Main	Main	Main	Main	Main	Main	Main
Norm Peterson	George Wendt	Main	Main	Main	Main	Main	Main	Main	Main	Main	Main	Main
Diane Chambers	Shelley Long	Main	Main	Main	Main	Main						Guest
Ernie "Coach" Pantusso	Nicholas Colasanto	Main	Main	Main								
Cliff Clavin	John Ratzenberger	Recurring	Main	Main	Main	Main	Main	Main	Main	Main	Main	Main
Frasier Crane	Kelsey Grammer			Recurring	Recurring	Main	Main	Main	Main	Main	Main	Main
Woody Boyd	Woody Harrelson				Main	Main	Main	Main	Main	Main	Main	Main
Lilith Sternin	Bebe Neuwirth				Guest	Recurring	Recurring	Recurring	Recurring	Recurring	Main (Note: In season 11, Neuwirth only made limited appearances, but was credited as a main cast member for the episodes in which she appeared.)	Main
Rebecca Howe	Kirstie Alley						Main	Main	Main	Main	Main	Main

=== Recurring characters ===
Although Cheers operated largely around that main ensemble cast and their interactions with various one-off characters, guest stars and recurring characters did occasionally supplement them. Notable repeat guests included Dan Hedaya as Nick Tortelli and Jean Kasem as Loretta Tortelli (who were the main characters in the first spin-off, The Tortellis), Fred Dryer as Dave Richards, Annie Golden as Margaret O'Keefe, Derek McGrath as Andy Schroeder (also referred to as Andy Andy), interchangeably Joel Polis and Robert Desiderio as rival bar owner Gary, Jay Thomas as Eddie LeBec, Roger Rees as Robin Colcord, Tom Skerritt as Evan Drake, Frances Sternhagen as Esther Clavin, Richard Doyle as Walter Gaines, Keene Curtis as John Allen Hill, Anthony Cistaro as Henri, Michael McGuire as Professor Sumner Sloan, and Harry Anderson as Harry "The Hat" Gittes. Jackie Swanson, who played the recurring role of Woody's girlfriend and eventual wife "Kelly Gaines-Boyd", appeared in 24 episodes from 1989 to 1993. The character is as equally dim and naive—but ultimately as sweet-natured—as Woody.

Paul Willson played the recurring barfly character Paul Krapence. (In one early appearance in the first season he was called "Glen", and was later credited on-screen as "Gregg" and "Tom", but he was playing the same character throughout.) Thomas Babson played "Tom", a law student often mocked by Cliff Clavin, for continually failing to pass the Massachusetts bar exam. "Al", played by Al Rosen, appeared in 38 episodes, and was known for his surly quips. Rhea Perlman's father Philip Perlman played the role of "Phil".

=== Celebrity appearances ===
Other celebrities guest-starred in single episodes as themselves throughout the series. Sports figures appeared on the show as themselves, with a connection to Boston or Sam's former team, the Red Sox, such as Luis Tiant, Wade Boggs, and Kevin McHale and Larry Bird (of the Boston Celtics). Some television stars also made guest appearances as themselves such as Alex Trebek, Arsenio Hall, Dick Cavett, Robert Urich, George McFarland and Johnny Carson. Various political figures even made appearances on Cheers such as then-Chairman of the Joint Chiefs of Staff Admiral William J. Crowe, former Colorado Senator Gary Hart, the Speaker of the House Tip O'Neill, the Senator John Kerry, the Governor Michael Dukakis, Ethel Kennedy (widow of Robert F. Kennedy), and the Mayor of Boston Raymond Flynn, the last five of whom all represented Cheers' home state and city.

In maternal roles, Glynis Johns, in a guest appearance in 1983, played Diane's mother, Helen Chambers. Nancy Marchand played Frasier's mother, Hester Crane, in an episode that aired in 1984. In an episode that aired in 1992, Celeste Holm – who had previously played Ted Danson's mother in "Three Men and a Baby" – appeared as Kelly's jokester of a paternal grandmother. Melendy Britt appeared in the episode "Woody or Won't He" (1990) as Kelly's mother, Roxanne Gaines, a very attractive high-society lady and a sexy, flirtatious upper-class cougar who tries to seduce Woody.

The musician Harry Connick Jr. appeared in an episode as Woody's cousin and plays a song from his Grammy-winning album We Are in Love (c. 1991). John Cleese won a Primetime Emmy Award for his guest appearance as "Dr. Simon Finch-Royce" in the fifth-season episode "Simon Says". Emma Thompson guest-starred as Nanny G/Nannette Guzman, a famous singing nanny and Frasier's ex-wife. Christopher Lloyd guest-starred as a tortured artist who wanted to paint Diane. Marcia Cross portrayed Rebecca's sister Susan in the season 7 episode Sisterly Love. John Mahoney once appeared as an inept jingle writer, which included a brief conversation with Frasier Crane, whose father he later portrayed on the spin-off Frasier. Peri Gilpin, who later played Roz Doyle on Frasier, also appeared in one episode of Cheers, in its 11th season, as Holly Matheson, a reporter who interviews Woody. The Righteous Brothers, Bobby Hatfield and Bill Medley, also guest-starred in different episodes. In "The Guy Can't Help It", Rebecca meets a plumber, played by Tom Berenger, who came to fix one of the beer keg taps. They marry in the series finale, triggering her resignation from Cheers. Judith Barsi appears in the episode Relief Bartender.

Notable guest appearances of actresses portraying Sam's sexual conquests or potential sexual conquests include Kate Mulgrew in the three-episode finale of season four, portraying Boston councilwoman Janet Eldridge; Donna McKechnie as Debra, Sam's ex-wife (with whom he is on good terms), who pretends to be an intellectual in front of Diane; Barbara Babcock as Lana Marshall, a talent agent who specializes in representing male athletes, whom she routinely sleeps with on-demand; Julia Duffy as Rebecca Prout, a depressed intellectual friend of Diane's; Alison La Placa as magazine reporter Paula Nelson; Carol Kane as Amanda, who Sam eventually learns was a fellow patient at the sanitarium with Diane; Barbara Feldon as Lauren Hudson, Sam's annual Valentine's Day fling (in an homage to Same Time, Next Year); Sandahl Bergman as Judy Marlowe, a longtime casual sex partner; Laurie Marlowe (Chelsea Noble), Judy's now-grown-up daughter, who always considered Sam a pseudo-father figure, & whom Sam falls for; Madolyn Smith-Osborne as Dr. Sheila Rydell, a colleague of Frasier and Lilith; Valerie Mahaffey as Valerie Hill, John Allen Hill's daughter whom Sam pursues if only to gain an upper hand in his business relationship with Hill; and Alexis Smith as Alice Anne Volkman, Rebecca's much older ex-professor. In season 9, episode 17, "I'm Getting My Act Together and Sticking It in Your Face", Sam, believing Rebecca wants a more serious relationship, pretends to be gay, his lover being a casual friend named Leon (Jeff McCarthy)—the plan ultimately leads to a kiss between Sam and Leon.

=== Death of Nicholas Colasanto ===
Near the end of production of the third season, the writers of Cheers had to deal with the death of one of the main actors. Nicholas Colasanto's heart condition had been diagnosed in the mid-1970s, but it had worsened. He had lost weight and was having trouble breathing during filming, and he was hospitalized shortly before filming finished for season three due to fluid in his lungs. He recovered but was not cleared to return to work. He was visiting the set in January 1985 to watch the filming of several episodes, and co-star Shelley Long commented, "I think we were all in denial. We were all glad he was there, but he had lost a lot of weight." Co-star Rhea Perlman added, "He wanted to be there so badly. He didn't want to be sick. He couldn't breathe well. It was hard. He was laboring all the time." Colasanto ultimately died of a heart attack at his home on February 12, 1985.

The third-season episodes of Cheers were filmed out of order, partly to accommodate Shelley Long's pregnancy. As a result, filming of the season finale - which had scenes with Colasanto in it - had already been completed at the time of his death. As the remaining episodes were filmed, Coach's absence was explained by having one of the characters mention that Coach was out of town for various reasons.

The Cheers writing staff assembled in June 1985 to discuss how to deal with the absence of Coach. They quickly discarded the idea that he had moved away, as they felt that he would never abandon his friends. In addition, most viewers were aware of Colasanto's death, so the writing staff decided to handle the situation more openly. The season four opener, "Birth, Death, Love and Rice", dealt with Coach's death and introduced Woody Harrelson, Colasanto's replacement.

== Episodes ==
Season	Episodes	Originally released		Rank	Rating	Households (seasons 1-6)/ Viewers (seasons 7–11) (millions)
Season	Episodes	First released	Last released	Rank	Rating	Households (seasons 1-6)/ Viewers (seasons 7–11) (millions)
1	22	September 30, 1982	March 31, 1983	74	13.1	10.9
2	22	September 29, 1983	May 10, 1984	34	16.6 (Note: Tied with Goodnight, Beantown.)	13.8
3	25	September 27, 1984	May 9, 1985	13	19.7	16.7
4	26	September 26, 1985	May 15, 1986	5	23.7	20.4
5	26	September 25, 1986	May 7, 1987	3	27.2	23.8
6	25	September 24, 1987	May 5, 1988	3	23.4	20.7
7	22	October 27, 1988	May 4, 1989	4	22.3	33.9
8	26	September 21, 1989	May 3, 1990	3	22.7	34.7
9	26	September 20, 1990	May 2, 1991	1	21.3	32.7
10	26	September 19, 1991	May 14, 1992	4	17.6	27.3
11	28	September 24, 1992	May 20, 1993	8	16.1 (Note: Tied with The CBS Sunday Movie.)	28.2

== Themes ==
Nearly all of Cheers takes place in the front room of the bar, but the characters often go into the rear pool room or the bar's office. Cheers does not show any action outside the bar until the first episode of the second season, which takes place in Diane's apartment.

The show's main theme in its early seasons is the romance between intellectual waitress Diane Chambers and the bar's owner, Sam Malone, a former Major League Baseball pitcher for the Boston Red Sox and recovering alcoholic. After Shelley Long (Diane) left the show, the focus shifted to Sam's new relationship with Rebecca Howe, a neurotic corporate ladder climber.

Many Cheers scripts centered or touched upon a variety of social issues, albeit humorously. As Toasting Cheers puts it, "The script was further strengthened by the writers' boldness in successfully tackling controversial issues such as alcoholism, homosexuality, and adultery."

Social class was a subtext of the show. The "upper class"—represented by characters like Diane Chambers, Frasier Crane, and Lilith Sternin—rub shoulders with middle- and working-class characters Sam Malone, Carla Tortelli, Norm Peterson, and Cliff Clavin. An extreme example of this was the relationship between Woody Boyd and a millionaire's daughter, Kelly Gaines. Many viewers enjoyed Cheers in part because of this focus on character development in addition to plot development.

Feminism and the role of women were also recurring themes throughout the show, with some critics seeing each of the major female characters portraying an aspect as a flawed feminist in her own way. Diane is a vocal feminist, and Sam is the epitome of everything she hates: promiscuity and chauvinism (see "Sam and Diane").

Homosexuality was dealt with from the first season, which was rare in the early 1980s on American television. In the first-season episode "The Boys in the Bar" (the title being a reference to the play and subsequent movie The Boys in the Band), a friend and former teammate of Sam's comes out in his autobiography. Some of the male regulars pressure Sam to take action to ensure that Cheers does not become a gay bar. The episode won a GLAAD Media Award, and the script's writers, Ken Levine and David Isaacs, were nominated for a Primetime Emmy Award.

Addiction also plays a role on Cheers, almost exclusively through Sam. He is a recovering alcoholic who had bought a bar during his drinking days. Frasier has a notable bout of drinking in the fourth-season episode "The Triangle", while Woody develops a gambling problem in the seventh season episode "Call Me Irresponsible".

Sam Malone, Carla Tortelli, and Norm Peterson were the three characters who would appear in every episode of Cheers.

== Cheers owners ==
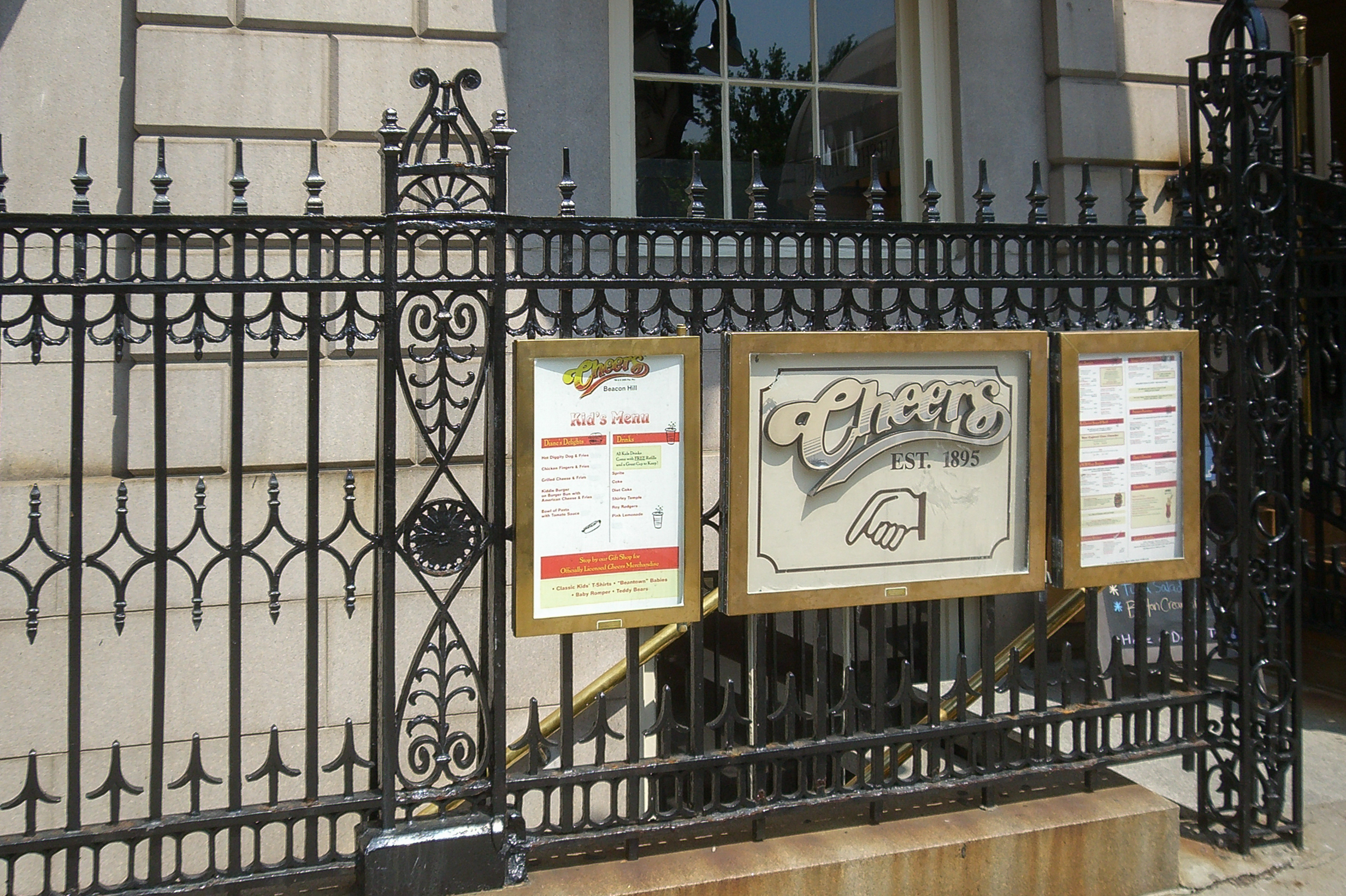
The Cheers sign in 2005

Cheers had several owners before Sam, as the bar was opened in 1889. The "Est. 1895" on the bar's sign is a made-up date chosen by Carla for numerology purposes, revealed in season 8, episode 6, "The Stork Brings a Crane", which also revealed the bar's address as 112 1/2 Beacon Street and that it originated under the name Mom's. In the series' second episode, "Sam's Women", Coach tells a customer looking for Gus, the owner of Cheers, that Gus is dead. In a later episode, Gus O'Mally comes back from Arizona for one night and helps run the bar.

The biggest storyline surrounding the ownership of Cheers begins in the fifth-season finale, "I Do, Adieu", when Sam and Diane part ways, due to Shelley Long's departure from the series. In addition, Sam leaves on a trip to circumnavigate the globe. Before he leaves, he sells Cheers to the Lillian Corporation. He returns in the sixth-season premiere, "Home is the Sailor", having sunk his boat, to find the bar under the new management of Rebecca Howe. He begs for his job back and is hired by Rebecca as a bartender. In the seventh-season premiere, "How to Recede in Business", Rebecca is fired and Sam is promoted to manager. Rebecca is allowed to keep a job at Lillian vaguely similar to what she had before, but only after Sam has Rebecca (in absentia) "agree" to a long list of demands that the corporation had for her.

From there, Sam occasionally attempts to buy the bar back with schemes that usually involve the wealthy executive Robin Colcord. Sam acquires Cheers again in the eighth-season finale, when it is sold back to him for 85¢ by the Lillian Corporation after he alerts the company to Colcord's insider trading. Fired by the corporation because of her silence on the issue, Rebecca is hired by Sam as a hostess/office manager. For the rest of the episode, to celebrate Sam's reclaiming the bar, a huge banner reading "Under OLD Management!" hangs from the staircase. When it is learned that the Pool Room and bathrooms are actually owned by Melville's (which spawns a war of wits between Sam and Melville's owner John Allen Hill), Rebecca later purchases them from Hill, making Sam and Rebecca partners in the ownership of Cheers (and more or less co-runners of the establishment).

Sam has two main battles. One is with Gary's Olde Towne Tavern, trying to beat them at some activity or another but always failing, except for one episode when Diane helps Cheers win the bowling trophy, and extending to the practical jokes they play on each other. The second is with Melville's owner John Allen Hill, who keeps annoying Sam with his pettiness and ego. Hill had an ongoing relationship with Carla.

== Production ==
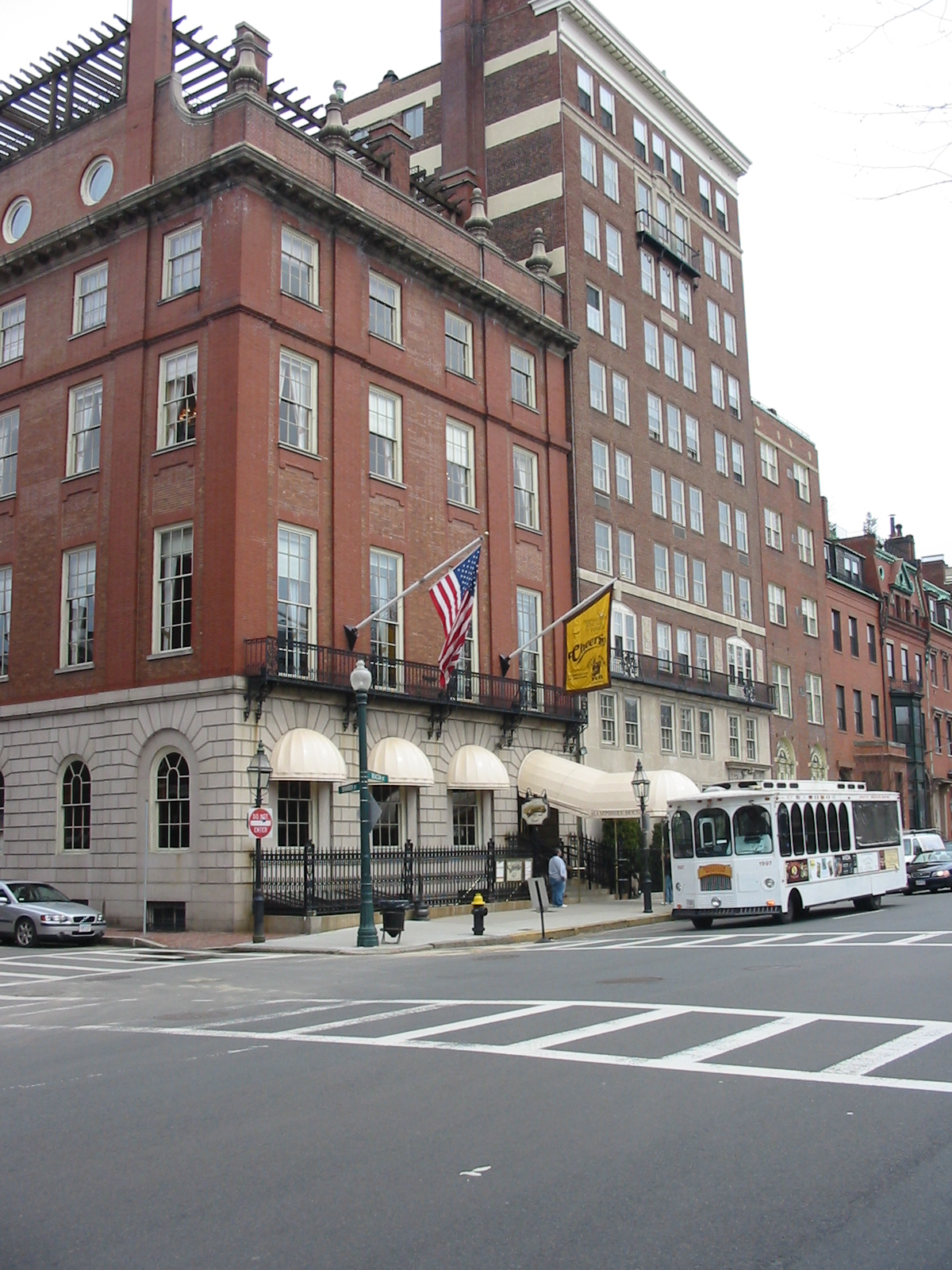
The Cheers Beacon Hill, formerly the Bull & Finch Pub, in Boston in 2005

=== Creation and concept ===
Some believe that the show is a rehashing of Boston's ABC affiliate WCVB's locally produced 1979 sitcom Park Street Under featuring Steve Sweeney and American Repertory Theater founder Karen MacDonald. Three men developed and created the Cheers television series: Glen and Les Charles ("Glen and Les") and James Burrows, who identified themselves as "two Mormons and a Jew." They aimed at "creating a show around a Spencer Tracy-Katharine Hepburn-type relationship" between their two main characters, Sam and Diane. Malone represents the average man, while Chambers represents class and sophistication. The show revolves around characters in a bar under "humorous adult themes" and "situations".

The original idea was a group of workers who interacted like a family, the goal being a concept similar to The Mary Tyler Moore Show. The creators considered making an American version of the British Fawlty Towers, set in a hotel or an inn. When the creators settled on a bar as their setting, the show began to resemble the radio program Duffy's Tavern, originally written and cocreated by James Burrows' father Abe Burrows. They liked the idea of a tavern, as it provided a continuous stream of new people, for a variety of characters. An early concept revolved around a woman becoming the new owner of the bar and the animosity created between her and the regulars, an idea that was used later in Season 6 when the character of Rebecca Howe is introduced.

Early discussions about the location of the show centered on Barstow, California, then Kansas City, Missouri. They eventually turned to the East Coast and finally Boston. The Bull & Finch Pub in Boston, which was the model for Cheers, was chosen from a phone book. When Glen Charles asked the bar's owner, Tom Kershaw, to shoot exterior and interior photos, he agreed, charging $1. Kershaw has since gone on to make millions of dollars, licensing the pub's image and selling a variety of Cheers memorabilia. The Bull & Finch became the 42nd-busiest outlet in the American food and beverage industry in 1997. During initial casting, Shelley Long, who was in Boston at the time filming A Small Circle of Friends, remarked that the bar in the script resembled a bar she had come upon in the city, which turned out to be the Bull & Finch.

=== Production team ===
The crew of Cheers numbered in the hundreds. The three creators—James Burrows and Glen and Les Charles—kept offices on Paramount's lot for the duration of the Cheers run. The Charles Brothers remained in overall charge throughout the show's run, frequently writing major episodes, though starting with the third season they began delegating the day-to-day running of the writing staff to various showrunners. Ken Estin and Sam Simon were appointed as showrunners for the third season, and succeeded by David Angell, Peter Casey and David Lee the following year. Angell, Casey and Lee would remain as showrunners until the end of the seventh season when they left to develop their own sitcom, Wings, and were replaced by Bill and Cheri Steinkellner and Phoef Sutton for the eighth through tenth seasons. For the final season, Tom Anderson and Dan O'Shannon acted as the showrunners.

James Burrows is regarded as being a factor in the show's longevity, directing 243 of the 270 episodes and supervising the show's production. Among the show's other directors were Andy Ackerman, Thomas Lofaro, Tim Berry, Tom Moore, Rick Beren, as well as cast members John Ratzenberger and George Wendt.

Craig Safan provided the series' original music for its entire run except the theme song. His extensive compositions for the show led to his winning numerous ASCAP Top TV Series awards for his music.

=== Casting ===
The character of Sam Malone was originally intended to be a retired football player and was slated to be played by Fred Dryer, but Danson was chosen in part because he was younger and had more acting experience than Dryer. After casting Ted Danson, it was decided that a former baseball player (Sam "Mayday" Malone) would be more believable than a retired football player. Dryer, however, went on to play sportscaster Dave Richards, an old friend of Sam, in three episodes. Bill Cosby was also considered early in the casting process for the role of Sam, after having been recommended by the network.

Shelley Long was recommended by various sources to the producers for the role of Diane Chambers, but Long wished to be offered the part straight out and had to be coaxed into giving an audition. When she did read for the part, according to Glen Charles, "that was it, we knew that we wanted her." Before the final decision was made, three pairs of actors were tested in front of the producers and network executives for Sam and Diane: Danson and Long, Fred Dryer and Julia Duffy, and William Devane and Lisa Eichhorn. The chemistry was so apparent between Long and Danson that it secured them the roles. Ted Danson was sent to bartending school to prepare him for the part and according to Burrows, had to learn "how to pretend that he knew a lot about sports" since Danson was not a sports fan in real life and had never been to a baseball game.

The character of Cliff Clavin was created for John Ratzenberger after he auditioned for the role of Norm Peterson, which eventually went to George Wendt. While chatting with producers afterward, he asked if they were going to include a "bar know-it-all", the part he eventually played. Alley joined the cast when Shelley Long left, and Woody Harrelson joined when Nicholas Colasanto died. Danson, Perlman and Wendt were the only actors to appear in every episode of the series; Ratzenberger appears in all but two (and his name wasn't part of the opening credit montage during the first season).

=== Filming styles and locations ===
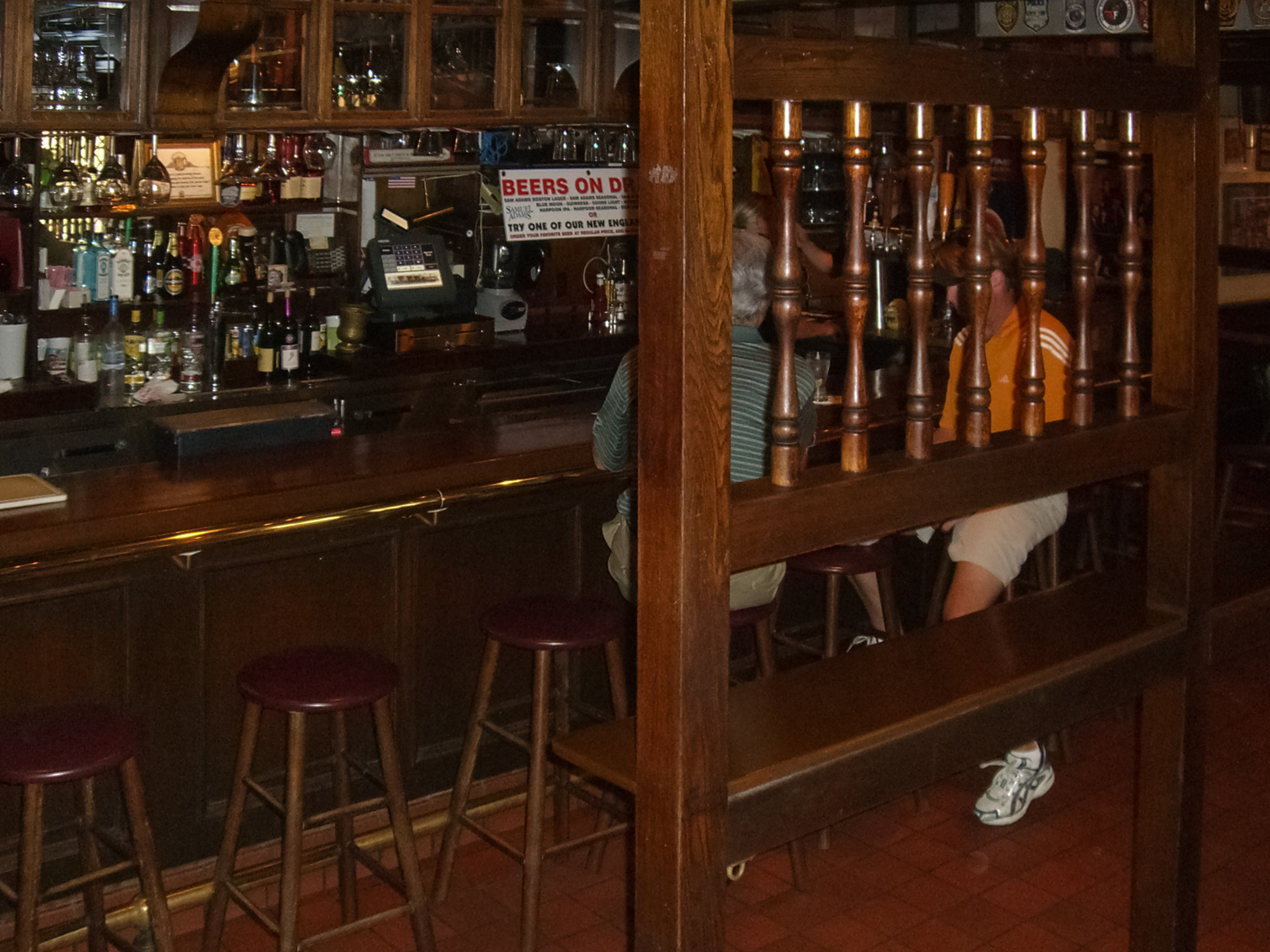
Interior of Cheers Beacon Hill (formerly the Bull & Finch Pub)

"On Cheers, we never did everything twice. On Cheers, we went through the scene and I only reshot jokes that didn't work or I went back and picked up shots I missed."

— James Burrows

Most Cheers episodes were, as a voiceover stated at the start of each, "filmed before a live studio audience" on Paramount Stage 25 in Hollywood, generally on Tuesday nights. Scripts for a new episode were issued the Wednesday before for a read-through, Friday was rehearsal day, and final scripts were issued on Monday. Burrows, who directed most episodes, insisted on using film stock rather than videotape. He was also noted for using motion in his directorial style, trying to constantly keep characters moving rather than standing still. Burrows and the Charles brothers emphasized to the cast to "never assume that you're not being watched" because the camera would be focused on the actors at all times, so they had to always be reacting and "always be funny". During the first season when ratings were poor Paramount and NBC asked that the show use videotape to save money, but a poor test taping ended the experiment and Cheers continued to use film.

Due to a decision by Glen and Les Charles, the cold open was often not connected to the rest of the episode, with the lowest-ranked writers assigned to create the jokes for them. Some cold opens were taken from episodes that ran too long.

The first year of the show took place entirely within the confines of the bar, the first location outside the bar being Diane's apartment in the second year. When the series became a hit, the characters started venturing further afield, first to other sets and eventually to an occasional exterior location.

==== Exterior location and real bars ====
The exterior location shots of the bar are of a Boston pub known at the time as the Bull & Finch Pub. The pub, whose interior differs from the set of the TV series, but has a similar style, has become a tourist attraction because of its association with the series, and draws nearly one million visitors annually. It was subsequently renamed Cheers Beacon Hill. In August 2001, a separate bar was opened in the Faneuil Hall Marketplace to capitalize on the popularity of the show. The Cheers Faneuil Hall location was designed to include a replica of the bar from the show, as well as to act as a museum with artifacts from the show. The Faneuil Hall location closed in 2020 due to the COVID-19 pandemic.

==== Set pieces after the show ====
After the show ended, the 1,000-square-foot bar set from Cheers was offered to the Smithsonian, which turned it down because it was too large. It was displayed for a short time at the defunct Hollywood Entertainment Museum, but later returned to storage, where it remained for many years. In 2014, CBS donated the set to the Museum of Television after a years-long campaign by James Burrows and his office on behalf of the museum's founder, James Comisar. At the time of the donation, Comisar initiated a planned $100,000 restoration of the set using former conservators from the Los Angeles County Museum of Art, although a site for the 10,000 item collection of the museum had not been decided upon.

The bar itself was sold at auction in 2023 for $675,000. The front door of the bar from the set sold at auction in 2025 for $163,000.

=== Theme song ===
The original version of one of the images used in the opening title sequence.

Before "Where Everybody Knows Your Name", written by Gary Portnoy and Judy Hart Angelo, became the show's theme song, Cheers' producers rejected two of Portnoy's and Hart Angelo's songs. The songwriters had collaborated to provide music for Preppies, an unsuccessful Broadway musical. When told they could not appropriate "People Like Us", Preppies' opening song, the pair wrote another song, "My Kind of People", which resembles "People Like Us" and was intended to satirize "the lifestyle of old decadent old-money WASPs", but to meet producers' demands, they rewrote the lyrics to be about "likeable losers" in a Boston bar. The show's producers rejected this song, as well. After they read the script of the series pilot, they created another song "Another Day". When Portnoy and Hart Angelo heard that NBC had commissioned thirteen episodes, they created an official theme song "Where Everybody Knows Your Name" and rewrote the lyrics. On syndicated airings of Cheers, the theme song was shortened to make room for additional commercials.

== Reception ==
=== Critical reception ===
Cheers was critically acclaimed in its first season, though it landed a disappointing 74th out of 96 shows in that year's ratings. This critical support, the early success at the Primetime Emmy Awards, and the support of the president of NBC's entertainment division Brandon Tartikoff, are thought to be the main reasons for the show's survival and eventual success. Tartikoff stated in 1983 that Cheers was a sophisticated adult comedy and that NBC executives "never for a second doubted" that the show would be renewed. Writer Levine believes that the most important reason was that the network recognized that it did not have other hit shows to help promote Cheers; as he later wrote, "[NBC] had nothing else better to replace it with."

Writing in 2016, drama critic Chris Jones called Cheers "a hinge sitcom – one foot in classic bits and shtick not far removed from Mel Brooks and another in ambitious, Seinfeld-like absurdism." In 2013, GQ magazine held an online competition to find the best TV comedy. Cheers was voted the greatest comedy show of all time. In 2017, James Charisma of Paste magazine ranked the show's opening sequence No. 5 on a list of The 75 Best TV Title Sequences of All Time. In 2022, Rolling Stone ranked Cheers as the eighth-greatest TV show of all time. In 2023, Variety ranked Cheers #11 on its list of the 100 greatest TV shows of all time.

=== Ratings ===
Ratings improved for the summer reruns after the first season. The cast went on various talk shows to try to further promote the series after its first season. By the second season Cheers was competitive with CBS's top-rated show Simon & Simon. With the growing popularity of Family Ties, which ran in the slot ahead of Cheers from January 1984 until Family Ties was moved to Sundays in 1987, and the placement of The Cosby Show in front of both at the start of their third season (1984), the line-up became a runaway ratings success that NBC eventually dubbed "Must See Thursday". The next season, Cheers ratings increased dramatically after Woody Boyd became a regular character as well. The fifth season earned the series the highest rating for the year that it would ever achieve. Although ratings mostly declined each year after that, the show retained a competitive advantage and rose to rank number one for the year for its first and only time in the ninth season. Although ratings and ranking both lost ground in the last two seasons, it still performed well, as it was the only show on NBC during those seasons to be in the top 10. By the end of its final season, the show had a run of eight consecutive seasons in the top ten of the Nielsen ratings; seven of them were in the top five.

NBC dedicated a whole night to the final episode of Cheers, following the one-hour season finale of Seinfeld (which was its lead-in). The show began with a "pregame" show hosted by Bob Costas, followed by the final 98-minute episode itself. NBC affiliates then aired tributes to Cheers during their local newscasts, and the night concluded with a special Tonight Show broadcast live from the Bull & Finch Pub. Although the episode fell short of its hyped ratings predictions to become the most-watched television episode, it was the most watched show that year, bringing in 93 million viewers (64 percent of all viewers that night), and ranked 11th all time in entertainment programming. The 1993 final broadcast of Cheers also emerged as the highest rated broadcast of NBC to date, as well as the most watched single episode from any television series throughout the decade 1990s on U.S. television. (Note: The article, "Cheers Finale Most-Watched Show of Season," from May 22, 1993, edition of Rocky Mountain News said that the share of viewing audience was 62. The 2009 article, "The gang gathers for one last round," by Hal Boedeker, claims that the finale drew over 80 million viewers in 1993.)

The episode originally aired in the usual Cheers spot of Thursday night, and was then rebroadcast on Sunday. While the original broadcast did not outperform the M*A*S*H finale, the combined non-repeating audiences for the Thursday and Sunday showings did. Television had greatly changed between the two finales, leaving Cheers with a broader array of competition for ratings.

NBC timeslots:

- Season 1 Episodes 1–12: Thursday at 9:00 pm
- Season 1 Episode 13 – Season 2 Episode 10: Thursday at 9:30 pm
- Season 2 Episode 11 – Season 11 Episode 28: Thursday at 9:00 pm

=== Serialized storylines ===
Although not the first sitcom to do it, Cheers employed the use of end-of-season cliffhangers and, starting with the third season, the show's storylines became more serialized. The show's success helped make such multi-episode story arcs popular on sitcoms, which Les Charles regrets.

[W]e may have been partly responsible for what's going on now, where if you miss the first episode or two, you are lost. You have to wait until you can get the whole thing on DVD and catch up with it. If that blood is on our hands, I feel kind of badly about it. It can be very frustrating."

Cheers began with a limited five-character ensemble consisting of Ted Danson, Shelley Long, Rhea Perlman, Nicholas Colasanto and George Wendt. Cheers was able to gradually phase in characters such as Cliff, Frasier, Lilith, Rebecca, and Woody. By the time season 10 began, the show had eight front characters in its roster.

=== Awards and honors ===
Over its eleven-season run, the Cheers cast and crew earned many awards. The show garnered a record 111 Primetime Emmy Award nominations, with a total of 28 wins. In addition, Cheers earned 31 Golden Globe nominations, with a total of six wins. Danson, Long, Alley, Perlman, Wendt, Ratzenberger, Harrelson, Grammer, Neuwirth, and Colasanto all received Emmy nominations for their roles. Cheers won the Golden Globe Award for "Best TV-Series – Comedy/Musical" in 1991 and the Primetime Emmy Award for Outstanding Comedy Series in 1983, 1984, 1989, and 1991. The series was presented with the "Legend Award" at the 2006 TV Land Awards, with many of the surviving cast members attending the event.

The following are awards that have been earned by the Cheers cast and crew over its 11-season run:

Winner	Award			
Winner	Emmy	Year	Golden Globe	Year
Kirstie Alley	Outstanding Lead Actress in a Comedy Series	1991	Best Performance by an Actress in a TV-Series – Comedy/Musical	1991
Ted Danson	Outstanding Lead Actor in a Comedy Series	1990; 1993	Best Performance by an Actor in a TV-Series – Comedy/Musical	1990; 1991
Woody Harrelson	Outstanding Supporting Actor in a Comedy Series	1989	—N/a	
Shelley Long	Outstanding Lead Actress in a Comedy Series	1983	Best Performance by an Actress in a TV-Series – Comedy/Musical	1985
Shelley Long	—N/a		Best Performance by an Actress in a Supporting Role in a Series, Mini-Series, or Motion Picture Made for TV	1983
Bebe Neuwirth	Outstanding Supporting Actress in a Comedy Series	1990; 1991	—N/a	
Rhea Perlman	Outstanding Supporting Actress in a Comedy Series	1984; 1985; 1986; 1989	—N/a	
John Cleese	Outstanding Guest Actor in a Comedy Series	1987	—N/a	
Production Awards	Outstanding Directing in a Comedy Series	1983; 1991	—N/a	
Production Awards	Outstanding Writing in a Comedy Series	1983 1984	—N/a	
Production Awards	Outstanding Individual Achievement in Graphic Design and Title Sequences	1983	—N/a	
Production Awards	Outstanding Film Editing for a Series	1984	—N/a	
Production Awards	Outstanding Editing for a Series – Multi-Camera Production	1988; 1993	—N/a	
Production Awards	Outstanding Live and Tape Sound Mixing and Sound Effects for a Series	1985	—N/a	
Production Awards	Outstanding Sound Mixing for a Comedy Series or Special	1986; 1987; 1990	—N/a	

== Distribution ==
=== Syndication ===
Cheers grew in popularity as it aired on American television and entered off-network syndication in 1987, initially distributed by Paramount Domestic Television. When the show went off the air in 1993, Cheers was syndicated in 38 countries, with 179 American television markets and 83 million viewers. When the quality of some earlier footage of Cheers began to deteriorate, it underwent a careful restoration in 2001. The series aired on Nick at Nite from 2001 to 2004 and on TV Land from 2004 to 2008, with Nick at Nite airing week-long Cheers "Everybody Knows Your Name" marathons. The show was removed from the lineup in 2004. The series began airing on Hallmark Channel in the United States in October 2008, and WGN America in 2009. In January 2011, Reelz Channel began airing the series in hour-long blocks. MeTV began airing Cheers weeknights in 2010 until 2018. USA Network has aired the series on Sunday early mornings and weekday mornings to allow it to show extended-length films of 2 1/2 hours and maintain symmetric schedules. As of October 5, 2020, it airs every weeknight at 11:00 p.m. and 11:30 p.m. ET on Decades (now Catchy Comedy). In addition to that, it also has occasionally appeared on their weekend binges, with its most recent one on April 6, 2025.

In 2011, Cheers was made available on the Netflix and Amazon Prime Video streaming services.

In Canada, Cheers was first aired on the CTV Television Network. Reruns of the show continued on CTV right after its original run. The show later reran on Prime and Omni Television. In Australia, Cheers was first aired on Network Ten. Reruns of the show began airing on Eleven (a digital channel of Network Ten) on January 11, 2011. NCRV in the Netherlands aired all 275 episodes in sequence, once per night, repeating the series a total of three times. In Italy, its original run aired on both Italia 1 and Canale 5 as Cin Cin from 1985 until 1995, with La7 airing reruns afterward. In Germany, ZDF began airing the show on January 15, 1985 as Prost Helmut. Unlike most countries despite having moderate success, Germany's original run didn't last long and ZDF pulled the program after just 13 episodes. It wasn't until 10 years later in 1995 when RTL began running all 275 episodes with German dubbing by Munich-based Plaza Synchron. In Sweden, the show first aired on TV2 on June 12, 1984, with TV12, TV4 Komedi, and TV4 Gold carrying reruns after its original run. RTP1 began airing the series in Portugal on May 11, 1985, with SIC TV carrying reruns after its original run. In Denmark, the show first aired on DR1 as Sam's Bar, with TVDanmark1 and 6'eren carrying reruns afterward. Other countries that aired reruns of the show include France and Japan.

Cheers was first screened in the United Kingdom on Channel 4 and was one of the then-fledgling network's first imports. As of 2012, Cheers has been repeated on British satellite channel CBS Drama. It has also been shown on the British free-to-air channel ITV4, with two episodes every weeknight. On March 16, 2015, the series began airing on British subscription channel Gold on weekdays at 9:30 a.m. and 10:00 a.m. Cheers aired again daily in 2019 on Channel 4, but later moved to weekends only.

==== High definition ====
A high-definition transfer of Cheers began running on HDNet (now AXS TV) in the United States in August 2010. The program was originally shot on film (but transferred to and edited on videotape) and broadcast in a 4:3 aspect ratio.

=== Home media ===
Paramount Home Entertainment and (from 2006 onward) CBS Home Entertainment have released all 11 seasons of Cheers on DVD in Region 1, Region 2, and Region 4. In the United States, some episodes from the final three seasons appear on the DVDs with music substitutions. For example, in the episode "Grease", "I Fought the Law" was replaced even though its removal affects the comedic value of the scenes in which it was originally heard. The finale episode (73 minutes long without commercials) is presented in its three-part syndicated cut. The series is also available in high-definition Blu-ray.

On March 6, 2012, CBS released Fan Favorites: The Best of Cheers. Based on the 2012 Facebook poll, the selected episodes are:

1. "Give Me a Ring Sometime" (season 1, episode 1)
2. "Diane's Perfect Date" (season 1, episode 17)
3. "Pick a Con, Any Con" (season 1, episode 19)
4. "Abnormal Psychology" (season 5, episode 4)
5. "Thanksgiving Orphans" (season 5, episode 9)
6. "Dinner at Eight-ish" (season 5, episode 20)
7. "Simon Says" (season 5, episode 21)
8. "An Old-Fashioned Wedding", parts one and two (season 10, episodes 25)

On May 5, 2015, CBS DVD released Cheers – The Complete Series on DVD in Region 1.

=== Digital media distribution ===
The complete 11 seasons of Cheers are available through the iTunes Store, Amazon Prime Video, Paramount+, Peacock and Hulu in high definition. In Canada, all seasons are available on streaming service Crave.

The entire series was available in the UK on All 4.

== Licensing ==
The series lent itself naturally to the development of Cheers bar-related merchandise, culminating in the development of a chain of Cheers themed pubs. Paramount's licensing group, led by Tom McGrath, developed the Cheers pub concept initially in partnership with Host Marriott, which placed Cheers themed pubs in over 15 airports around the world. The original Cheers bar is in Boston, historically known as the Bull and Finch; a Cheers restaurant in the Faneuil Hall marketplace; and Sam's Place, a spin-off sports bar concept also located in Faneuil Hall. In 1997, Europe's first officially licensed Cheers bar opened in London's Regent's Street W1. Like Cheers Faneuil Hall, Cheers London is a replica of the set. The gala opening was attended by James Burrows and cast members George Wendt and John Ratzenberger. The Cheers bar in London closed on December 31, 2008. The actual bar set had been on display at the Hollywood Entertainment Museum until the museum's closing in early 2006.

The theme song to the show was eventually licensed to a Canadian restaurant, Kelsey's Neighbourhood Bar & Grill.

CBS currently holds the rights to the Cheers franchise as a result of the 2005 Viacom split which saw Paramount transfer its entire television studio to CBS (both CBS and Viacom would reunite in 2019).

== Spin-offs ==
Some of the actors and actresses from Cheers brought their characters onto other television shows, either in a guest appearance or on a new spin-off series. The most successful Cheers spin-off was Frasier, which featured Frasier Crane following his relocation back to Seattle, Washington. Sam, Diane, and Woody all individually appeared in Frasier episodes, with Lilith appearing as a guest on multiple episodes. In the season nine episode "Cheerful Goodbyes", Frasier returns to Boston and meets up with the Cheers gang, later attending Cliff's retirement party. Frasier was revived in 2023, moving back to Boston like Cheers.

Although Frasier was more successful, The Tortellis was the first series to spin off from Cheers, premiering in 1987. The show featured Carla's ex-husband Nick Tortelli and his wife Loretta, but was canceled after 13 episodes and drew protests for its stereotypical depictions of Italian Americans.

== Crossovers ==
Woody, Cliff, and Norm on The Simpsons

In addition to direct spin-offs, several Cheers characters had guest appearance crossovers with other shows, including Wings and St. Elsewhere (episode "Cheers"). Cheers has also been spoofed or referenced in other media, including The Simpsons (spoofing the title sequence and theme song in "Flaming Moe's"; actually visiting the place with vocal role reprises of the majority of the principal cast in "Fear of Flying"), Scrubs (episode "My Life in Four Cameras"), and the 2012 comedy film Ted.

The eighth-anniversary special of Late Night with David Letterman, airing in 1990, begins with a scene at Cheers in which the bar's TV gets stuck on NBC and all the bar patrons decide to go home instead of staying to watch David Letterman. The scene was re-used to open Letterman's final episode in 1993. A similar scene aired in the Super Bowl XVII Pregame Show on NBC, in which the characters briefly discuss the upcoming game.

In 2019, members of the Cheers cast, Rhea Perlman, George Wendt, John Ratzenberger and Kirstie Alley reprised their characters in an episode of The Goldbergs where they play customers of Geoff's short-lived food delivery business.

In the 2010 show Adventure Time, the show Cheers is referenced a few times, usually by Ice King/Simon because it was his favorite show back when he was a human living in the 20th century. This is explored in greater detail in the 2023 spin-off series Fionna and Cake, which is partially set within the mind of Simon. All televisions in that world simply play an animated rendition of Cheers reruns on every channel, and the characters sometimes sing the theme song in difficult moments. The season finale of the show is simply entitled "Cheers".

== Cultural references ==
In Australia, Cheers is remembered for its role in the infamous cancellation of the 1992 Nine Network special Australia's Naughtiest Home Videos. Due to the then-owner of Nine Network Kerry Packer's objections to its content, Australia's Naughtiest Home Videos was pulled off the air during its first and only broadcast; viewers saw the network abruptly begin airing a rerun of Cheers midway through the special, either after a scheduled commercial break or a Nine Network bumper claiming a technical problem. Nine Network's affiliate in Perth did not air the special at all and filled its timeslot with two episodes of Cheers. When the program was re-aired in its entirety in 2008, it abruptly cut away to the opening of Cheers midway through in a reenactment of the incident before resuming the second half that was not broadcast.

In the Cheers episode "Woody For Hire, Norman Meets the Apes", Woody shows and tells everyone how he was an extra on Boston-based drama Spenser: For Hire. In the season 4 episode of Seinfeld titled "The Pitch", Jerry and George are presenting their idea for a sitcom to NBC executives. George is unhappy with their offer and feels that he deserves the same salary as Ted Danson which he claims was $800,000 per episode, being that Cheers is also an NBC show. Danson's reported salary was actually $250,000 per episode. At this point Cheers was in its 10th season and Ted Danson had won an Emmy and a Golden Globe the year before. In another Seinfeld episode, "The Trip", George runs into George Wendt (portraying himself) while backstage on the set of The Tonight Show and annoys him by suggesting that the series change its setting from a bar to a rec room or community center.

In the seventh episode of the second season of How I Met Your Mother, a coffee shop barista mistakenly hears Barney's name as "Swarley" and writes it on his cup. This leads to a running gag in which everyone mercilessly refers to Barney as "Swarley" despite his protests, which culminates in everyone in McClaren's bar shouting "Swarley" when he enters and playing the Cheers theme song. The credits are then shown in the "Cheers" style. In the season seven episode, In Tailgate, Ted and Barney are outraged with the price to get into MacLaren's on New Year's Eve, so they offer for everyone to come upstairs. In the apartment, there is a puzzles sign that is designed to parody Cheers. Ted and Barney employ Kevin as their bartender, and they invent a theme song which also parodies the Cheers theme song.

In the 2015 video game Fallout 4, which is set in Boston, there is a bar named Prost Bar near Boston Common that, when entered, is an almost exact replica of the bar featured on the series. It includes two dead bodies sitting at the end of the bar, with one of them wearing a mail carrier's uniform, a direct reference to regular barfly Cliff Clavin.

In the season 2 finale of the NBC sitcom The Good Place, Ted Danson's character Michael appears as a bartender while wearing a blue plaid button-down, in a clear homage to Danson's character in Cheers.

== Remake ==
In September 2011, Plural Entertainment debuted a remake of the series on Spanish television, also titled Cheers. Set at an Irish pub, it starred Alberto San Juan as Nicolás "Nico" Arnedo, the equivalent of Sam Malone on the original series. It also used the original theme song, rerecorded in Spanish by Dani Martín, under the title "Donde la gente se divierte."

In December 2012, The Irish Film and Television Network announced that casting was underway on an Irish-language version of Cheers produced by production company Sideline. The new show, tentatively titled Teach Seán, would air on Ireland's TG4 and features a main character who, like Sam Malone, is a bar owner, a retired athlete, and a recovering alcoholic. However, because of being set in Ireland, the barman is a "former hurling star" rather than an ex-baseball player. As of August 2019, the Irish remake has not occurred.

== Cheers: Live on Stage ==
On September 9, 2016, a stage adaptation called Cheers: Live on Stage opened at the Shubert Theatre in Boston. Comprising pieces of the original TV series, the play was adapted by Erik Forrest Jackson. It was produced by Troika/Stageworks. The director was Matt Lenz. It starred Grayson Powell as Sam Malone, Jillian Louis as Diane Chambers, Barry Pearl as Ernie "Coach" Pantusso, Sarah Sirotta as Carla Tortelli, Paul C. Vogt as Norm Peterson, and Buzz Roddy as Cliff Clavin. The production was scheduled to tour through 2017, but was canceled in 2016.

== See also ==
- Early Doors (2003)
- Park Street Under (1979)

== Bibliography ==
- Bjorklund, Dennis A. (1997). Toasting Cheers: An Episode Guide to the 1982–1993 Comedy Series, with cast biographies and character profiles. McFarland & Company, Inc., Jefferson, North Carolina. ISBN 978-0-89950-962-4.
- Jones, Gerald (1992). Honey, I'm Home! Sitcoms: Selling the American Dream. New York: Grove Weidenfeld—Grove Press. ISBN 978-0-8021-1308-5.
- Wendt, George (2009). Drinking with George. New York: Simon Spotlight Entertainment. ISBN 978-1-4391-4958-4.
