= Top-rated United States television programs of 1986–87 =

This table displays the top-rated primetime television series of the 1986–87 season as measured by Nielsen Media Research.

Rank	Program	Network	Rating
1	The Cosby Show	NBC	34.9
2	Family Ties	NBC	32.7
3	Cheers	NBC	27.2
4	Murder, She Wrote	CBS	25.4
5	The Golden Girls	NBC	24.5
6	60 Minutes	CBS	23.3
7	Night Court	NBC	23.2
8	Growing Pains	ABC	22.7
9	Moonlighting	ABC	22.4
10	Who's the Boss?	ABC	22.0
11	Dallas	CBS	21.3
12	Newhart	CBS	19.5
13	Amen	NBC	19.4
14	227	NBC	18.9
15	Matlock	NBC	18.6
15	CBS Sunday Night Movie	CBS	18.6
15	NBC Monday Night Movie	NBC	18.6
18	Monday Night Football	ABC	18.4
19	Kate & Allie	CBS	18.3
20	NBC Sunday Night Movie	NBC	18.2
21	L.A. Law	NBC	17.4
21	My Sister Sam	CBS	17.4
23	Falcon Crest	CBS	17.3
24	Highway to Heaven	NBC	17.2
24	Dynasty	ABC	17.2
26	Knots Landing	CBS	16.8
26	Miami Vice	NBC	16.8
28	ALF	NBC	16.5
28	Hunter	NBC	16.5
30	Head of the Class	ABC	16.4
