= Top-rated United States television programs of 1990–91 =

This table displays the top-rated primetime television series of the 1990–91 season as measured by Nielsen Media Research.

Rank	Program	Network	Rating
1	Cheers	NBC	21.3
2	60 Minutes	CBS	20.6
3	Roseanne	ABC	18.1
4	A Different World	NBC	17.5
5	The Cosby Show	NBC	17.1
6	Murphy Brown	CBS	16.9
7	Empty Nest	NBC	16.7
7	America's Funniest Home Videos	ABC	16.7
9	Monday Night Football	ABC	16.6
10	The Golden Girls	NBC	16.5
10	Designing Women	CBS	16.5
12	Murder, She Wrote	CBS	16.4
13	America's Funniest People	ABC	16.3
14	Full House	ABC	15.9
15	Family Matters	ABC	15.8
16	Unsolved Mysteries	NBC	15.7
17	Matlock	NBC	15.5
18	Coach	ABC	15.3
19	Who's the Boss?	ABC	15.0
19	CBS Sunday Movie	CBS	15.0
21	In the Heat of the Night	NBC	14.9
21	Major Dad	CBS	14.9
23	L.A. Law	NBC	14.8
24	Doogie Howser, M.D.	ABC	14.7
25	Grand	NBC	14.6
26	Head of the Class	ABC	14.5
27	Growing Pains	ABC	14.3
27	Baby Talk	ABC	14.3
27	Davis Rules	ABC	14.3
30	The Wonder Years	ABC	14.2
