= Cheers Beacon Hill =

Bar and restaurant in Boston, Massachusetts, US

Coordinates: 42.355888°N 71.071222°W

- Company type: Private
- Industry: Restaurants, Bars
- Founded: Boston, Massachusetts, bar/restaurant (1969)
- Founder: Tom Kershaw
- Headquarters: 84 Beacon Street; Boston, Massachusetts; 02108
- Number of employees: 275
- Website: https://cheersboston.com/

Cheers Beacon Hill is a bar/restaurant located on Beacon Street in the Beacon Hill neighborhood of Boston, Massachusetts, across from the Boston Public Garden. Founded in 1969 as the Bull & Finch Pub, the bar is best remembered internationally as the exterior of the bar seen in the NBC sitcom Cheers, which ran between 1982 and 1993. The Bull & Finch changed its name to Cheers in 2002 after closing a deal with CBS Studios, the successors to show producers Paramount Television.

== History ==
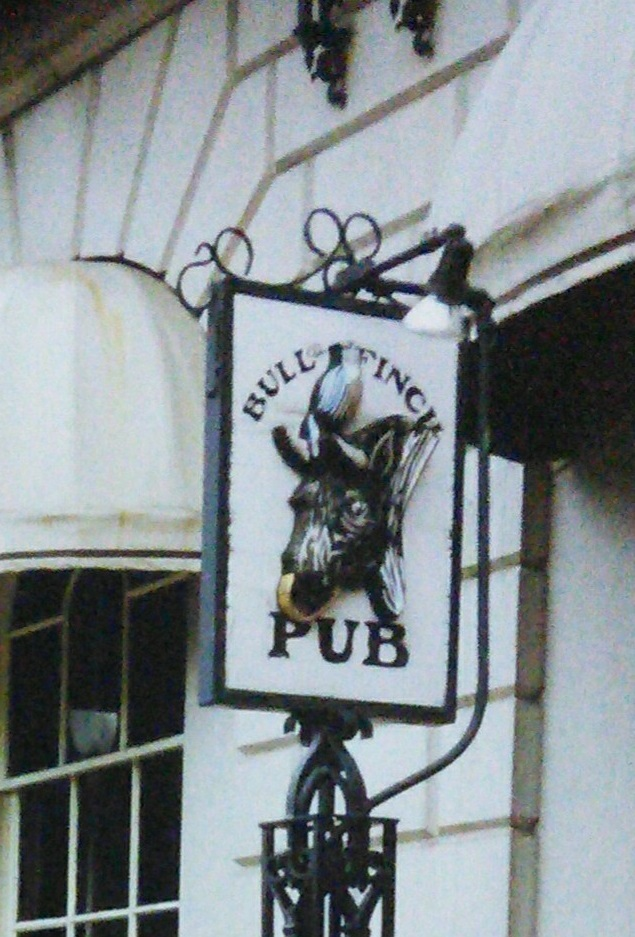
Bull & Finch Pub in the early 1990s. The original sign.

The Bull and Finch Pub was founded in 1969 by Thomas Kershaw and a partner. The two owned a building in Beacon Hill, Hampshire House, and wanted to find a use for the basement which at the time was inefficiently used as just storage. They tried to model the Bull & Finch on English pubs, complete with accoutrements imported from England. One story behind its name is that it is a reference to the architect Charles Bulfinch, who designed the Massachusetts State House among other buildings. The bar was popular with locals in its first decade. The upstairs of Hampshire House at the time was a private club called Quaffer's. In 1982 Boston magazine awarded the Bull & Finch the title of Boston's best bar.

In 1981, writers Glen and Les Charles and producer James Burrows visited Boston seeking an authentic local bar to use for the TV show that would become Cheers. The trio thought the Bull & Finch fit perfectly. Kershaw, happy to get free advertising, accepted a fee of one dollar for rights to use the exterior image of the property in Cheers. The establishing shot of the opening sequence showed the Bull & Finch in all eleven seasons. The popularity of the show led to a great increase in tourist visits to the bar, although locals began to avoid it. A 1990 report said that the bar had become one of the top three tourist destinations in Boston.

On May 20, 1993, the night of Cheers series finale, Tom Kershaw held a large party outside of the bar to commemorate the event. Many people gathered there to watch the finale on two large TV screens specially set up for the event, while the cast of Cheers watched the finale inside. The episode of The Tonight Show with Jay Leno that aired after the finale took place live at the party outside the bar, with many celebrities including sportscaster Bob Costas present. Jay Leno interviewed those in the bar and played games with the Cheers cast, and at the end of the show the Cheers theme was played outside.

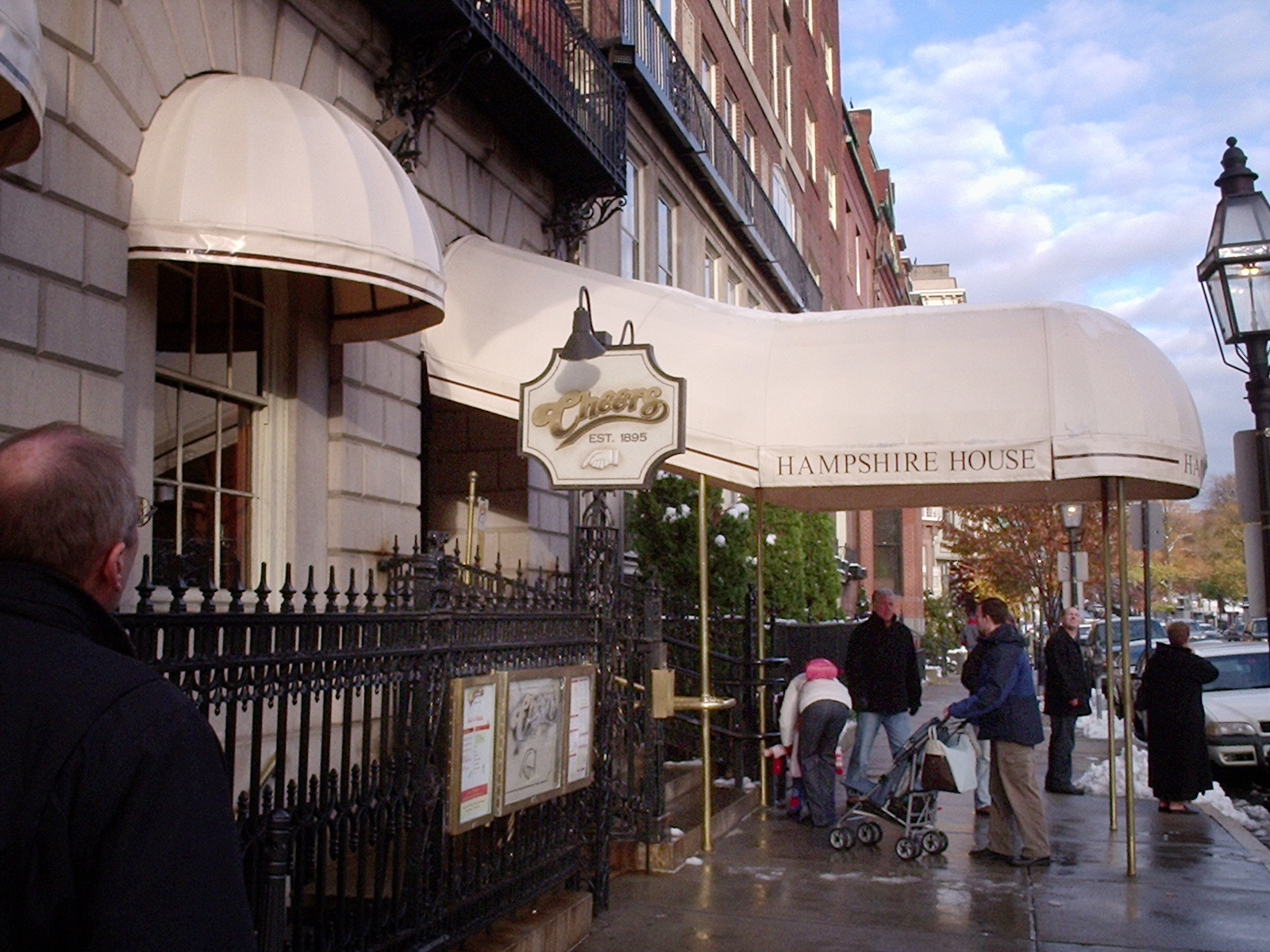
Cheers Beacon Hill on Beacon Street in Boston.

At some point, the bar expanded upward into Hampshire House, with a replica of the California set used for people expecting the version from television. In 2002, the bar was renamed to "Cheers Beacon Hill" as part of a new deal with CBS Studios, the successors to show producers Paramount Television, along with increasing the amount of Cheers merchandise sold.

Between August 2001 and August 2020, there was a branch location, Cheers Faneuil Hall, in Faneuil Hall. To capitalize on the popularity of the TV show, this location was built with a replica of the TV bar. The final day of the replica bar included a live band playing the Cheers theme, an appearance by owner Tom Kershaw and a raffle to win a photocopy of the script for the final episode. Kershaw cited the COVID-19 pandemic and a dispute with the landlord at Faneuil Hall for the closing.

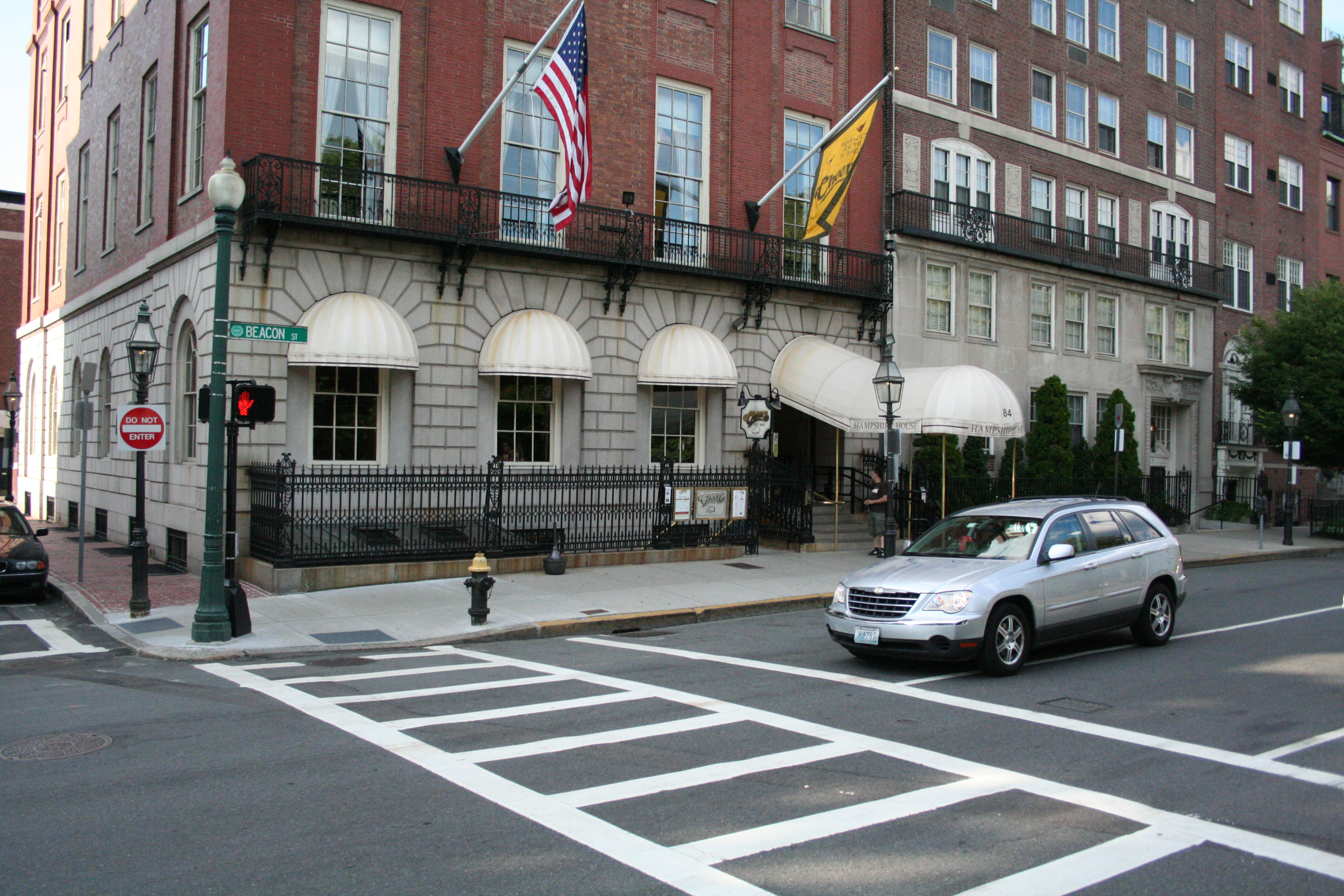
Cheers Beacon Hill (July 2008)

On March 10, 2009, the Boston Globe reported that longtime Cheers bartender Eddie Doyle, with a 35-year tenure that predated the sitcom Cheers, had been laid off. Owner Tom Kershaw cited the recession as the reason for the decision. The block on which Cheers resides has been renamed Eddie Doyle Square in his honor.

== Owner ==
Cheers Beacon Hill is owned by Thomas A. Kershaw, who also owns the Hampshire House restaurant upstairs and the nearby restaurants, 75 Chestnut, and 75 Liberty Wharf in the Seaport.
