= Park Street Under =

American television series

Park Street Under is a sitcom set in a fictional subterranean bar near the Park Street subway station in Boston, Massachusetts. It was produced starting in 1979 by Boston television station WCVB-TV. This was a rare example in the United States of a half-hour sitcom produced by a local station during the 1970s. Park Street Under was, at least according to popular legend, an inspiration for the NBC sitcom Cheers, which was also set in a fictional Boston bar in a basement, with several similar characters.

The cast included Steve Sweeney and James Spruill, father of filmmaker Robert Patton-Spruill. The scripts were by Jonathan Stathakis and Stu Taylor.

Park Street Under is also the original name for the Red Line subway platforms at Park Street, which are located underneath the older streetcar tunnels that became the Green Line.
