= Top-rated United States television programs of 1992–93 =

List of highly rated television programs of 1992 - 1993

This table displays the top-rated primetime television series of the 1992–93 season as measured by Nielsen Media Research.

Rank	Program	Network	Rating
1	60 Minutes	CBS	21.9
2	Roseanne	ABC	20.7
3	Home Improvement	ABC	19.4
4	Murphy Brown	CBS	17.9
5	Murder She Wrote	CBS	17.7
6	Coach	ABC	17.5
7	Monday Night Football	ABC	16.7
8	CBS Sunday Movie	CBS	16.1
8	Cheers	NBC	16.1
10	Full House	ABC	15.8
11	Northern Exposure	CBS	15.2
12	20/20	ABC	15.1
12	Rescue 911	CBS	15.1
14	CBS Tuesday Movie	CBS	14.8
15	Love & War	CBS	14.7
16	The Fresh Prince of Bel-Air	NBC	14.6
16	Hangin' with Mr. Cooper	ABC	14.6
16	The Jackie Thomas Show	ABC	14.6
19	Evening Shade	CBS	14.5
20	Hearts Afire	CBS	14.3
21	Unsolved Mysteries	NBC	14.2
22	Primetime Live	ABC	14.1
23	Dr. Quinn, Medicine Woman	CBS	14.0
24	NBC Monday Movie	NBC	13.9
25	Seinfeld	NBC	13.7
26	48 Hours	CBS	13.5
26	Blossom	NBC	13.5
28	ABC Sunday Night Movie	ABC	13.3
28	Matlock	ABC	13.3
30	Wings	NBC	13.0
30	The Simpsons	FOX	13.0
