= Randy Chestnut =

American comedian, writer, and actor

- Born: Randall Jay Chestnut; July 13, 1971; Dallas, Texas, United States

Comedy career
- Years active: 1997–Present
- Medium: Stand-up, television, radio
- Genres: Observational comedy, wit/word play, satire/political satire, black comedy, improvisational comedy
- Subjects: American culture, everyday life, human behavior, American politics, religion, profanity

Randall Jay Chestnut is an American comedian, writer, and actor.

He is noted for his wide-ranging religious views and his marriage to an outreach pastor at Christ's Chapel, physicality, and sarcasm. Among other topics, he often focuses on American politics. Once, when asked what he'd do if he were mayor of Madison, Wisconsin, he replied,

I'd do photo ops with Marilyn Manson and underprivileged children while my contributors continued to dump toxic waste in the rivers of Third World nations, then go home and do lines off the bare back of my 19-year-old Malaysian concubine. You know, like a real politician.

Throughout his career, his material has also focused on his support of LGBT rights and his criticism of religion.

== Early life and career ==
Randy Chestnut was born in Dallas, Texas, in 1971. His early years were spent moving from state to state, living in Texas, Massachusetts, Maine, Florida, and Wisconsin. Beginning his career in Madison, Wisconsin at the Funny Business Comedy Club – later called The Comedy Club On State – Chestnut spent nearly two years as an amateur, honing his stagecraft and developing his material. When asked, Chestnut claims his comedy is

imported at great expense from a left-handed cobbler in Sussex, England, who answers to the name "King Cat Crocodile, Hector The Fuel Injector."

In reality, he writes his own.

By 1999, he won his first and only comedy competition. Although he was voted Funniest Person in Madison (Wisconsin) in 1999, he found the experience distasteful, and avoids competitions to this day. Also in 1999, Chestnut was invited to perform in the first of two Comics Come Home special events sponsored by Charter Communications and Comedy Central, the proceeds of which were to benefit the Chris Farley Foundation. The second invitation came in 2000. Other performers included Bob Saget, Jim Breuer, Victoria Jackson, Tom Arnold, Kevin Farley, John P. Farley, Tim Kazurinsky, and Sue Murphy.

== Post–September 11, 2001–2008 ==
Chestnut recounts trouble with increasingly hostile responses from American audiences over his criticism and jokes about President George W. Bush and the Bush administration due to a post-9/11 rise in nationalism. Chestnut admits to being antagonistic and inflammatory, and includes stories of altercations with audience members in his act. He persevered, however, and cites eventual popular disenchantment with the Occupation of Iraq as the reason for more positive reactions to later, similar criticism.

In May 2004, Chestnut recorded his first CD at The Comedy Club on State, entitled I Was Funny... Now Pay Me, written and performed by himself, and produced by Austin Katt. A series of delays kept the CD from being released, including the suicide of close friend Eric Harnisch. Chestnut canceled shows in order to help lay his friend to rest. He wrote Harnisch's epitaph,

His wit was exceeded only by his intelligence, his intelligence only by his selflessness, his selflessness only by his kindness, his kindness only by his extraordinary life, and his life only by those he touched with it.

Eventually, delays kept the CD I Was Funny... Now Pay Me from mass release.

== Religion, politics, and social commentary ==
In his act, Chestnut often expresses his contempt for religion in all forms, and is particularly contemptuous of the Catholic Church.

Much of his political material is harshly critical of Republican and neoconservative ideas, in addition to promoting largely liberal ideas, despite claiming to be both nonpartisan and equally disdainful of liberals and Democrats. He is also fiercely anti-corporate in his act.
