= Comics Come Home =

Annual charity stand-up comedy festival

Comics Come Home is an annual charity stand-up comedy festival held in Boston, Massachusetts. The event, co-founded by comedian Denis Leary (who remains its curator and presenter) and hockey hall of famer Cam Neely, was first held in 1995 and is now the longest-running comedy fundraiser in the United States.

Since its inception, funds raised from the festival have been donated to the Cam Neely Foundation for Cancer Care. As of 2018 the festival had contributed approximately US$11.5 million to the Cam Neely Foundation. Neely played with the Boston Bruins and later became team president; after his mother died of cancer in 1987 and his father in 1993, he founded the charity in 1995 and that same year asked Leary if he were interested in orchestrating a Boston-based comedy benefit show.

The inaugural Comics Come Home was held in the Orpheum Theater in 1995. From 2005 to 2013 it was held at the Agganis Arena, and since 2014 it has been held at TD Garden.

The performance by Wanda Sykes in 2016 included jokes about then-president-elect Donald Trump, which were booed by the audience; Sykes ended her performance early. Her set was followed by a performance by Nick DiPaolo, whose performance joked about rape and Hillary Clinton, leading to a confrontation with an audience member. In 2017, John Mayer appeared at the festival, playing guitar as Leary and Jimmy Fallon sang a cover of Aerosmith's "Walk This Way". The 2019 Comics Come Home marked its 25th event, and included a guest appearance by Michael J. Fox.

== Performers ==
- Jim Breuer
- Eddie Brill
- Bill Burr
- Randy Chestnut
- Louis C.K.
- Lenny Clarke
- Dane Cook
- Pete Correale
- Nick DiPaolo
- Jimmy Fallon
- Craig Ferguson
- Michael J. Fox
- Jim Gaffigan
- Billy Gardell
- Janeane Garofalo
- Gary Gulman
- Pete Holmes
- Christine Hurley
- Robert Kelly
- Jessica Kirson
- Denis Leary
- Kelly Macfarland
- Marc Maron
- Jay Mohr
- Tracy Morgan
- John Mulaney
- Patrice O'Neal
- Brian Regan
- Kenny Rogerson
- Jon Stewart
- Steve Sweeney
- Wanda Sykes
- Warren Thomas
- Tony V
- Shawn Wayans
- Steven Wright
- Joe Yanetty
