= Steve Sweeney (comedian) =

American comedian (born 1949)

- Born: September 5, 1949 (age 77); Charlestown, Massachusetts, U.S.
- Notable work: Park Street Under

Comedy career
- Years active: Early 70s - Present
- Medium: Stand-up, Television, Film
- Genres: Observational comedy, Satire

Steve Sweeney (born September 5, 1949) is an American comedian.

== Biography ==
Sweeney was born in Charlestown, a section of Boston. His Boston accent and idiosyncratic mannerisms are featured in his stand-up act. He has headlined in several comedy clubs including Caroline's Comedy Club in New York City.

A graduate of Charlestown High School, he earned a BA in Theatre Arts at the University of Massachusetts Boston (1974) and an MFA from the University of Southern California.

During the early 1970s, a group of Boston comedians regularly performed at a comedy club started by Barry Crimmins in a back room of Ding-Ho, a Chinese Restaurant near Inman Square in Cambridge, MA. The group included Don Gavin, Martin Olson, Lenny Clarke, Kevin Meaney, Jay Leno, Bobcat Goldthwait, Bill Sohonage, and Steven Wright. Sweeney became known for his use of dialects and commentary on the New England political scene in his act.

Sweeney had a role on Park Street Under, a Boston-based sitcom which has been cited as a potential inspiration for successful television show Cheers. He has appeared on shows such as the Late Show with David Letterman, Evening at The Improv, and Comics Come Home. Sweeney has also appeared in over 20 films, including Rodney Dangerfield's Back to School, Judd Apatow's Celtic Pride, and There's Something About Mary with Ben Stiller.

For a short time Steve was on the morning show on 100.7 FM WZLX, first with "Mornings with Tai and Steve Sweeney", followed by "Steve Sweeney's Neighborhood" after Tai left the station.

On November 3, 2005, Sweeney opened Steve Sweeney's Comedy Club in Boston's Copley Square with longtime friend Dick Doherty.

Currently, along with doing stand-up, he is also a guest judge on the local talent show "Community Auditions".

On March 29, 2013, Steve Sweeney appeared on Scorch PFG TV.

Sweeney performed a 5-minute act opening for J. Geils Band at the Boston One Fund concert.

Steve Sweeney and Joe Malone, the former Treasurer of the Commonwealth of Massachusetts, co-host a podcast called "Sweeney and Malone" on Boston Herald Radio.

== Filmography ==
Year	Title	Role	Notes
1983	The 8th Annual Young Comedians Show	Himself	TV special
1986	Billy Galvin	Diner Owner	
1986	Back to School	Security Guard	
1986	New Wave Comedy	Himself	
1995	Comics Come Home	Himself	TV movie
1996	Celtic Pride	Nick, the Landlord	
1996	Comics Come Home 2	Himself	TV movie
1998	Next Stop Wonderland	Cab Driver	
1998	Southie	Paul Finnerty	
1998	There's Something About Mary	Police Officer	
1998	Vig	Angie	
1998	Behind the Zipper with Magda	Police Officer in 1985	Uncredited, Video short
1999	Harbour Lights	Cyril	Episode: "Baywatch"
2000	Me, Myself & Irene	Neighbor Ed	
2002	Dr. Katz, Professional Therapist	Steve	Voice, Episode: "Bakery Ben"
2002	Tough Crowd with Colin Quinn	Himself	TV series
2008	What Doesn't Kill You	Power Wash Jerry	
2008	Phantom Gourmet		
2008	Credit Card Roulette		
2014	The Equalizer	Counterman	
2016	Bleed for This	Official at Caesar's Weigh In	
2018	Sweeney Killing Sweeney	Sweeney	
