= List of Cheers episodes =

Cheers originally aired on NBC from September 30, 1982 to May 20, 1993. Over the series run, 275 original episodes aired, an average of around 25 episodes per season. In the early 1990s, 20 volumes of VHS cassettes were released; each had three half-hour episodes. The whole series is available on multi-disc sets on DVD, two to four per season. The series is also available on iTunes, on Paramount+ and Seasons 1–4 are on Hulu. Episodes aired on C4 and C4+1 on weekdays.

== Series overview ==
Season	Episodes	Originally released		Rank	Rating	Households (seasons 1-6)/ Viewers (seasons 7–11) (millions)
Season	Episodes	First released	Last released	Rank	Rating	Households (seasons 1-6)/ Viewers (seasons 7–11) (millions)
1	22	September 30, 1982	March 31, 1983	74	13.1	10.9
2	22	September 29, 1983	May 10, 1984	34	16.6 (Note: Tied with Goodnight, Beantown.)	13.8
3	25	September 27, 1984	May 9, 1985	13	19.7	16.7
4	26	September 26, 1985	May 15, 1986	5	23.7	20.4
5	26	September 25, 1986	May 7, 1987	3	27.2	23.8
6	25	September 24, 1987	May 5, 1988	3	23.4	20.7
7	22	October 27, 1988	May 4, 1989	4	22.3	33.9
8	26	September 21, 1989	May 3, 1990	3	22.7	34.7
9	26	September 20, 1990	May 2, 1991	1	21.3	32.7
10	26	September 19, 1991	May 14, 1992	4	17.6	27.3
11	28	September 24, 1992	May 20, 1993	8	16.1 (Note: Tied with The CBS Sunday Movie.)	28.2

== Episodes ==
=== Season 1 (1982–83) ===
(Note: DVD Season 1 Disc 1 of the box-set episodes are out of sequence. The following is the correct airing order)

No. overall	No. in season	Title	Directed by	Written by	Original release date	Rating/share/rank (households)
1	1	"Give Me a Ring Sometime"	James Burrows	Les Charles	September 30, 1982	9.6 / 15 / #60
2	2	"Sam's Women"	James Burrows	Earl Pomerantz	October 7, 1982	14.7 / 22 / #49
3	3	"The Tortelli Tort"	James Burrows	Tom Reeder	October 14, 1982	11.1 / 17 / #63
4	4	"Sam at Eleven"	James Burrows	Glen Charles & Les Charles	October 21, 1982	11.1 / 17 / #62
5	5	"Coach's Daughter"	James Burrows	Ken Estin	October 28, 1982	11.0 / 17 / #69
6	6	"Any Friend of Diane's"	James Burrows	Ken Levine & David Isaacs	November 4, 1982	12.4 / 18 / #62
7	7	"Friends, Romans, Accountants"	James Burrows	Ken Levine & David Isaacs	November 11, 1982	13.6 / 21 / #49
8	8	"Truce or Consequences"	James Burrows	Ken Levine & David Isaacs	November 18, 1982	11.9 / 18 / #63
9	9	"Coach Returns to Action"	James Burrows	Earl Pomerantz	November 25, 1982	10.0 / 18 / #69
10	10	"Endless Slumper"	James Burrows	Sam Simon	December 2, 1982	12.7 / 19 / #57
11	11	"One for the Book"	James Burrows	Katherine Green	December 9, 1982	12.4 / 19 / #60
12	12	"The Spy Who Came In for a Cold One"	James Burrows	David Lloyd	December 16, 1982	12.1 / 18 / #64
13	13	"Now Pitching, Sam Malone"	James Burrows	Ken Levine & David Isaacs	January 6, 1983	14.8 / 22 / #56
14	14	"Let Me Count the Ways"	James Burrows	Heide Perlman	January 13, 1983	12.9 / 20 / #61
15	15	"Father Knows Last"	James Burrows	Heide Perlman	January 20, 1983	14.9 / 22 / #46
16	16	"The Boys in the Bar"	James Burrows	Ken Levine & David Isaacs	January 27, 1983	14.9 / 22 / #41
17	17	"Diane's Perfect Date"	James Burrows	David Lloyd	February 10, 1983	13.3 / 18 / #44
18	18	"No Contest"	James Burrows	Heide Perlman	February 17, 1983	15.9 / 24 / #49
19	19	"Pick a Con... Any Con"	James Burrows	David Angell	February 24, 1983	13.1 / 20 / #58
20	20	"Someone Single, Someone Blue"	James Burrows	David Angell	March 3, 1983	14.7 / 22 / #43
21	21	"Showdown, Part 1"	James Burrows	Glen Charles & Les Charles	March 24, 1983	13.6 / 21 / #51
22	22	"Showdown, Part 2"	James Burrows	Glen Charles & Les Charles	March 31, 1983	14.7 / 23 / #36

Specials

No.	Title	Directed by	Written by	Original release date
S01	"Super Bowl XVII Pregame segment"	James Burrows	Ken Levine & David Isaacs	January 30, 1983
S02	"Uncle Sam Malone"	James Burrows	Ralph Phillips additional material: Brian H. Sato & Steven Amaya	TBA

=== Season 2 (1983–84) ===
No. overall	No. in season	Title	Directed by	Written by	Original release date	Rating/share/rank (households)
23	1	"Power Play"	James Burrows	Glen Charles & Les Charles	September 29, 1983	18.4 / 29 / #19
24	2	"Li'l Sister Don't Cha" "Little Sister Don't Cha"	James Burrows	Heide Perlman	October 13, 1983	18.6 / 28 / #21
25	3	"Personal Business"	James Burrows	Tom Reeder	October 20, 1983	17.4 / 26 / #29
26	4	"Homicidal Ham"	James Burrows	David Lloyd	October 27, 1983	18.0 / 28 / #22
27	5	"Sumner's Return"	James Burrows	Michael J. Weithorn	November 3, 1983	15.3 / 23 / #34
28	6	"Affairs of the Heart"	James Burrows	Heide Perlman	November 10, 1983	18.1 / 26 / #24
29	7	"Old Flames"	James Burrows	David Angell	November 17, 1983	17.2 / 25 / #25
30	8	"Manager Coach"	James Burrows	Earl Pomerantz	November 24, 1983	14.2 / 25 / #42
31	9	"They Called Me Mayday"	James Burrows	David Angell	December 1, 1983	16.9 / 25 / #30
32	10	"How Do I Love Thee, Let Me Call You Back"	James Burrows	Earl Pomerantz	December 8, 1983	16.4 / 25 / #28
33	11	"Just Three Friends"	James Burrows	David Lloyd	December 15, 1983	16.0 / 26 / #34
34	12	"Where There's a Will..."	James Burrows	Nick Arnold	December 22, 1983	18.3 / 27 / #15
35	13	"Battle of the Exes"	James Burrows	Ken Estin & Sam Simon	January 5, 1984	19.6 / 28 / #23
36	14	"No Help Wanted"	James Burrows	Max Tash	January 12, 1984	17.3 / 26 / #29
37	15	"And Coachie Makes Three"	James Burrows	Heide Perlman	January 19, 1984	18.5 / 27 / #21
38	16	"Cliff's Rocky Moment"	James Burrows	David Lloyd	January 26, 1984	19.3 / 29 / #20
39	17	"Fortune and Men's Weight"	James Burrows	Heide Perlman	February 2, 1984	13.1 / 19 / #51
40	18	"Snow Job"	James Burrows	David Angell	February 9, 1984	17.1 / 25 / #26
41	19	"Coach Buries a Grudge"	James Burrows	David Lloyd	February 16, 1984	14.6 / 21 / #33
42	20	"Norman's Conquest"	James Burrows	Lissa Levin	February 23, 1984	17.2 / 26 / #22
43	21	"I'll Be Seeing You, Part 1"	James Burrows	Glen Charles & Les Charles	May 3, 1984	13.9 / 21 / #32
44	22	"I'll Be Seeing You, Part 2"	James Burrows	Glen Charles & Les Charles	May 10, 1984	13.6 / 22 / #30

=== Season 3 (1984–85) ===
No. overall	No. in season	Title	Directed by	Written by	Original release date	Rating/share/rank (households)
45	1	"Rebound, Part 1"	James Burrows	Glen Charles & Les Charles	September 27, 1984	20.7 / 32 / #7
46	2	"Rebound, Part 2"	James Burrows	Glen Charles & Les Charles	October 4, 1984	19.5 / 29 / #13
47	3	"I Call Your Name"	James Burrows	Peter Casey & David Lee	October 18, 1984	18.6 / 28 / #17
48	4	"Fairy Tales Can Come True"	James Burrows	Sam Simon	October 25, 1984	19.8 / 30 / #14
49	5	"Sam Turns the Other Cheek"	James Burrows	David Lloyd	November 1, 1984	17.8 / 27 / #19
50	6	"Coach in Love, Part 1"	James Burrows	David Angell	November 8, 1984	16.7 / 25 / #19
51	7	"Coach in Love, Part 2"	James Burrows	David Angell	November 15, 1984	19.2 / 29 / #15
52	8	"Diane Meets Mom"	James Burrows	David Lloyd	November 22, 1984	14.4 / 25 / #38
53	9	"An American Family"	James Burrows	Heide Perlman	November 29, 1984	20.5 / 30 / #15
54	10	"Diane's Allergy"	James Burrows	David Lloyd	December 6, 1984	20.0 / 17 / #20
55	11	"Peterson Crusoe"	James Burrows	David Angell	December 13, 1984	18.8 / 29 / #21
56	12	"A Ditch in Time"	James Burrows	Ken Estin	December 20, 1984	17.4 / 26 / #20
57	13	"Whodunit?"	James Burrows	Tom Reeder	January 3, 1985	18.4 / 26 / #21
58	14	"The Heart Is a Lonely Snipehunter"	James Burrows	Heide Perlman	January 10, 1985	19.9 / 27 / #18
59	15	"King of the Hill"	James Burrows	Elliot Shoenman	January 24, 1985	18.7 / 28 / #22
60	16	"Teacher's Pet"	James Burrows	Tom Reeder	January 31, 1985	20.6 /29 / #13
61	17	"The Mail Goes to Jail"	James Burrows	David Lloyd	February 7, 1985	18.2 / 26 / #22
62	18	"Bar Bet"	James Burrows	Jim Parker	February 14, 1985	21.3 / 32 / #9
63	19	"Behind Every Great Man"	James Burrows	Ken Levine & David Isaacs	February 21, 1985	22.3 / 33 / #9
64	20	"If Ever I Would Leave You"	James Burrows	Ken Levine & David Isaacs	February 28, 1985	19.9 / 29 / #16
65	21	"The Executive's Executioner" "Executive's Executioner Hines"	James Burrows	Heide Perlman	March 7, 1985	22.9 / 34 / #5
66	22	"Cheerio, Cheers"	James Burrows	Sam Simon	April 11, 1985	20.6 / 31 / #8
67	23	"The Bartender's Tale"	James Burrows	Sam Simon	April 18, 1985	20.1 / 31 / #6
68	24	"The Belles of St. Clete's"	James Burrows	Ken Estin	May 2, 1985	19.7 / 32 / #4
69	25	"Rescue Me"	James Burrows	Ken Estin	May 9, 1985	17.9 / 30 / #13

=== Season 4 (1985–86) ===
No. overall	No. in season	Title	Directed by	Written by	Original release date	Rating/share/rank (households)
70	1	"Birth, Death, Love and Rice"	James Burrows	Heide Perlman	September 26, 1985	26.0 / 39 / #4
71	2	"Woody Goes Belly Up"	James Burrows	Heide Perlman	October 3, 1985	23.4 / 35 / #5
72	3	"Someday My Prince Will Come"	James Burrows	Tom Seeley & Norm Gunzenhauser	October 17, 1985	23.5 / 36 / #4
73	4	"The Groom Wore Clearasil"	James Burrows	Peter Casey & David Lee	October 24, 1985	20.9 / 30 / #13
74	5	"Diane's Nightmare"	James Burrows	David Lloyd	October 31, 1985	24.1 / 36 / #6
75	6	"I Will Gladly Pay You Tuesday"	James Burrows	Cheri Eichen & Bill Steinkellner	November 7, 1985	21.1 / 30 / #14
76	7	"2 Good to Be 4 Real"	James Burrows	Peter Casey and David Lee	November 14, 1985	24.7 / 37 / #4
77	8	"Love Thy Neighbor"	James Burrows	David Angell	November 21, 1985	21.9 / 33 / #11
78	9	"From Beer to Eternity"	James Burrows	Peter Casey & David Lee	November 28, 1985	21.6 / 36 / #10
79	10	"The Barstoolie"	James Burrows	Andy Cowan & David S. Williger	December 5, 1985	24.4 / 36 / #5
80	11	"Don Juan Is Hell"	James Burrows	Phoef Sutton	December 12, 1985	24.0 / 36 / #6
81	12	"Fools and Their Money"	James Burrows	Heide Perlman	December 19, 1985	23.1 / 35 / #4
82	13	"Take My Shirt... Please"	James Burrows	David Lloyd	January 9, 1986	24.3 / 36 / #7
83	14	"Suspicion"	James Burrows	Tom Reeder	January 16, 1986	25.4 / 36 / #5
84	15	"The Triangle"	James Burrows	Susan Seeger	January 23, 1986	24.0 / 35 / #7
85	16	"Cliffie's Big Score"	James Burrows	Heide Perlman	January 30, 1986	23.8 / 34 / #6
86	17	"Second Time Around"	Thomas Lofaro	Cheri Eichen & Bill Steinkellner	February 6, 1986	24.7 / 35 / #5
87	18	"The Peterson Principle"	James Burrows	Peter Casey & David Lee	February 13, 1986	23.9 / 35 / #5
88	19	"Dark Imaginings"	James Burrows	David Angell	February 20, 1986	23.4 / 34 / #6
89	20	"Save the Last Dance for Me"	James Burrows	Heide Perlman	February 27, 1986	26.0 / 38 / #3
90	21	"Fear Is My Co-Pilot"	James Burrows	Cheri Eichen & Bill Steinkellner	March 13, 1986	23.5 / 35 / #3
91	22	"Diane Chambers Day"	James Burrows	Kimberly Hill	March 20, 1986	26.2 / 39 / #3
92	23	"Relief Bartender"	James Burrows	Miriam Trogdon	March 27, 1986	22.3 / 35 / #6
93	24	"Strange Bedfellows, Part 1"	James Burrows	David Angell	May 1, 1986	23.9 / 37 / #3
94	25	"Strange Bedfellows, Part 2"	James Burrows	David Angell	May 8, 1986	22.6 / 35 / #5
95	26	"Strange Bedfellows, Part 3"	James Burrows	David Angell	May 15, 1986	24.4 / 37 / #4

=== Season 5 (1986–87) ===
No. overall	No. in season	Title	Directed by	Written by	Original release date	Rating/share/rank (households)
96	1	"The Proposal"	James Burrows	Peter Casey & David Lee	September 25, 1986	30.0 / 46 / #3
97	2	"The Cape Cad"	James Burrows	Andy Cowan & David S. Williger	October 2, 1986	29.7 / 45 / #3
98	3	"Money Dearest"	James Burrows	Janet Leahy	October 9, 1986	26.4 / 38 / #3
99	4	"Abnormal Psychology"	James Burrows	Janet Leahy	October 16, 1986	29.8 / 44 / #3
100	5	"House of Horrors with Formal Dining and Used Brick"	James Burrows	David Angell	October 30, 1986	27.2 / 41 / #5
101	6	"Tan 'n' Wash"	James Burrows	Cheri Eichen & Bill Steinkellner	November 6, 1986	28.8 / 41 / #3
102	7	"Young Dr. Weinstein"	James Burrows	Phoef Sutton	November 13, 1986	29.8 / 43 / #3
103	8	"Knights of the Scimitar"	James Burrows	Jeff Abugov	November 20, 1986	26.9 / 40 / #5
104	9	"Thanksgiving Orphans"	James Burrows	Cheri Eichen & Bill Steinkellner	November 27, 1986	21.7 / 38 / #6
105	10	"Everyone Imitates Art"	James Burrows	Heide Perlman	December 4, 1986	28.4 / 42 / #3
106	11	"The Book of Samuel"	James Burrows	Phoef Sutton	December 11, 1986	28.2 / 42/ #3
107	12	"Dance, Diane, Dance"	James Burrows	Jeff Abugov	December 18, 1986	28.4 / 43 / #3
108	13	"Chambers vs. Malone"	James Burrows	David Angell	January 8, 1987	28.2 / 41 / #3
109	14	"Diamond Sam"	James Burrows	Tom Reeder	January 15, 1987	30.3 / 43 / #3
110	15	"Spellbound"	James Burrows	Kimberly Hill	January 22, 1987	30.7 / 42 / #5
111	16	"Never Love a Goalie, Part 1"	James Burrows	Ken Levine & David Isaacs	January 29, 1987	30.3 / 43 / #3
112	17	"Never Love a Goalie, Part 2"	James Burrows	Ken Levine & David Isaacs	February 5, 1987	27.7 / 40 / #3
113	18	"One Last Fling"	James Burrows	Cheri Eichen & Bill Steinkellner	February 12, 1987	27.4 / 41 / #3
114	19	"Dog Bites Cliff"	James Burrows	Joanne Pagliaro	February 18, 1987	19.6 / 28 / #13
115	20	"Dinner at Eight-ish"	James Burrows	Phoef Sutton	February 26, 1987	27.9 / 40 / #4
116	21	"Simon Says"	James Burrows	Peter Casey & David Lee	March 5, 1987	29.6 / 43 / #3
117	22	"The Godfather, Part III"	James Burrows	Chris Cluess & Stuart Kreisman	March 19, 1987	26.3 / 39 / #3
118	23	"Norm's First Hurrah" "Norman's First Hurrah"	Thomas Lofaro	Andy Cowan & David S. Williger	March 26, 1987	27.4 / 41 / #3
119	24	"Cheers: The Motion Picture"	Tim Berry	Phoef Sutton	April 2, 1987	27.9 / 43 / #4
120	25	"A House Is Not a Home"	James Burrows	Phoef Sutton	April 30, 1987	26.0 / 42 / #3
121	26	"I Do, Adieu"	James Burrows	Glen Charles & Les Charles	May 7, 1987	28.4 / 45 / #1

Specials

No.	Title	Original release date
S03	"Pregame segment of the 1986 World Series, Game 3"	October 21, 1986

=== Season 6 (1987–88) ===
No. overall	No. in season	Title	Directed by	Written by	Original release date	Rating/share/rank (households)
122	1	"Home Is the Sailor"	James Burrows	Glen Charles & Les Charles	September 24, 1987	28.4 / 44 / #3
123	2	"I on Sports"	James Burrows	Ken Levine & David Isaacs	October 1, 1987	26.1 / 41 / #4
124	3	"Little Carla, Happy at Last: Part 1"	James Burrows	Cheri Eichen & Bill Steinkellner	October 15, 1987	25.3 / 40 / #3
125	4	"Little Carla, Happy at Last: Part 2"	James Burrows	Cheri Eichen & Bill Steinkellner	October 22, 1987	22.8 / 34 / #8
126	5	"The Crane Mutiny"	James Burrows	David Angell	October 29, 1987	26.8 / 41 / #3
127	6	"Paint Your Office"	James Burrows	Peter Casey & David Lee	November 5, 1987	26.0 / 40 / #3
128	7	"The Last Angry Mailman"	James Burrows	Ken Levine & David Isaacs	November 12, 1987	26.4 / 40 / #2
129	8	"Bidding on the Boys"	Thomas Lofaro	David Lloyd	November 19, 1987	26.4 / 41 / #3
130	9	"Pudd'n Head Boyd" "Puddin' Head Boyd"	James Burrows	Cheri Eichen & Bill Steinkellner	November 26, 1987	19.5 / 36 / #8
131	10	"A Kiss Is Still a Kiss"	James Burrows	David Lloyd	December 3, 1987	23.5 / 36 / #4
132	11	"My Fair Clavin"	James Burrows	Phoef Sutton	December 10, 1987	23.1 / 36 / #4
133	12	"Christmas Cheers"	James Burrows & Thomas Lofaro	Cheri Eichen & Bill Steinkellner	December 17, 1987	25.5 / 40 / #3
134	13	"Woody for Hire Meets Norman of the Apes"	Tim Berry	Phoef Sutton	January 7, 1988	28.1 / 41 / #2
135	14	"And God Created Woodman"	John Ratzenberger	Jeffrey Duteil	January 14, 1988	27.9 / 41 / #3
136	15	"Tale of Two Cuties"	Michael Zinberg	Cheri Eichen & Bill Steinkellner	January 21, 1988	26.9 / 40 / #3
137	16	"Yacht of Fools"	Thomas Lofaro	Phoef Sutton	February 4, 1988	24.9 / 37 / #3
138	17	"To All the Girls I've Loved Before"	James Burrows	Ken Levine & David Isaacs	February 11, 1988	24.7 / 36 / #4
139	18	"Let Sleeping Drakes Lie"	James Burrows	David Lloyd	February 18, 1988	19.4 / 28 / #6
140	19	"Airport V"	George Wendt	Ken Levine & David Isaacs	February 25, 1988	20.4 / 30 / #7
141	20	"The Sam in the Gray Flannel Suit"	Tim Berry	Cheri Eichen & Bill Steinkellner	March 3, 1988	25.9 / 39 / #3
142	21	"Our Hourly Bread"	Andy Ackerman	Sue Herring	March 10, 1988	24.9 / 38 / #2
143	22	"Slumber Party Massacred"	James Burrows	Phoef Sutton	March 24, 1988	25.1 / 40 / #3
144	23	"Bar Wars"	James Burrows	Ken Levine & David Isaacs	March 31, 1988	23.2 / 39 / #3
145	24	"The Big Kiss-Off"	James Burrows	Ken Levine & David Isaacs	April 28, 1988	23.6 / 38 / #2
146	25	"Backseat Becky, Up Front"	James Burrows	Cheri Eichen & Bill Steinkellner	May 5, 1988	22.8 / 38 / #1

=== Season 7 (1988–89) ===
No. overall	No. in season	Title	Directed by	Written by	Original release date	U.S. viewers (millions)	Rating/share/rank (households)
147	1	"How to Recede in Business"	James Burrows	David Angell	October 27, 1988	35.3	24.4 / 38 / #2
148	2	"Swear to God"	James Burrows	Tom Reeder	November 3, 1988	31.2	21.8 / 33 / #7
149	3	"Executive Sweet: Part 1"	James Burrows	Phoef Sutton	November 10, 1988	36.5	23.5 / 35 / #2
150	4	"One Happy Chappy in a Snappy Serape: Part 2"	James Burrows	Cheri Eichen & Bill Steinkellner	November 17, 1988	31.4	21.4 / 31 / #5
151	5	"Those Lips, Those Ice"	James Burrows	Peter Casey & David Lee	November 24, 1988	30.0	17.3 / 31 / #15
152	6	"Norm, Is That You?"	James Burrows	Cheri Eichen & Bill Steinkellner	December 8, 1988	36.4	23.7 / 37 / #3
153	7	"How to Win Friends and Electrocute People"	James Burrows	Phoef Sutton	December 15, 1988	35.6	23.7 / 37 / #4
154	8	"Jumping Jerks"	James Burrows	Ken Levine & David Isaacs	December 22, 1988	31.3	20.6 / 34 / #3
155	9	"Send in the Crane"	James Burrows	David Lloyd	January 5, 1989	37.9	25.1 / 37 / #4
156	10	"Bar Wars II: The Woodman Strikes Back"	James Burrows	Ken Levine & David Isaacs	January 12, 1989	39.2	25.4 / 38 / #3
157	11	"Adventures in Housesitting"	James Burrows	Patricia Niedzialek & Cecile Alch	January 19, 1989	35.4	22.7 / 34 / #4
158	12	"Please Mr. Postman"	James Burrows	Brian Pollack & Mert Rich	February 2, 1989	38.3	24.7 / 37 / #5
159	13	"Golden Boyd"	James Burrows	Cheri Eichen & Bill Steinkellner	February 6, 1989	25.7	17.3 / 25 / #23
160	14	"I Kid You Not"	James Burrows	Story by : Rick Beren; Teleplay by : Rod Burton	February 16, 1989	35.1	22.8 / 35 / #4
161	15	"Don't Paint Your Chickens"	James Burrows	Ken Levine & David Isaacs	February 23, 1989	35.1	23.3 / 35 / #5
162	16	"The Cranemakers"	Andy Ackerman	Phoef Sutton	March 2, 1989	35.9	24.3 / 37 / #4
163	17	"Hot Rocks"	James Burrows	Ken Levine & David Isaacs	March 16, 1989	33.5	22.5 / 35 / #5
164	18	"What's Up, Doc?"	James Burrows	Brian Pollack & Mert Rich	March 30, 1989	36.8	24.4 / 39 / #5
165	19	"The Gift of the Woodi"	James Burrows	Phoef Sutton	April 6, 1989	32.2	22.2 / 36 / #3
166	20	"Call Me Irresponsible"	James Burrows	Dan O'Shannon & Tom Anderson	April 13, 1989	32.6	22.3 / 36 / #3
167	21	"Sisterly Love"	James Burrows	David Lloyd	April 27, 1989	30.0	20.8 / 34 / #3
168	22	"The Visiting Lecher"	James Burrows	David Lloyd	May 4, 1989	30.5	20.8 / 33 / #3

Specials

No.	Title	Original release date	U.S. viewers (millions)	Rating/share/rank (households)
S04	"Mickey's 60th Birthday"	November 13, 1988	23.1	12.9 / 20 / #29

=== Season 8 (1989–90) ===
No. overall	No. in season	Title	Directed by	Written by	Original release date	U.S. viewers (millions)	Rating/share/rank (households)
169	1	"The Improbable Dream, Part 1"	James Burrows	Cheri Eichen & Bill Steinkellner	September 21, 1989	36.4	24.1 / 39 / #3
170	2	"The Improbable Dream, Part 2"	James Burrows	Cheri Eichen & Bill Steinkellner	September 28, 1989	36.1	24.3 / 39 / #3
171	3	"A Bar Is Born"	James Burrows	Phoef Sutton	October 12, 1989	33.6	22.4 / 37 / #3
172	4	"How to Marry a Mailman"	James Burrows	Brian Pollack & Mert Rich	October 19, 1989	37.2	24.7 / 38 / #1
173	5	"The Two Faces of Norm"	Andy Ackerman	Eugene B. Stein	October 26, 1989	35.7	24.1 / 39 / #3
174	6	"The Stork Brings a Crane"	Andy Ackerman	David Lloyd	November 2, 1989	37.6	24.4 / 37 / #3
175	7	"Death Takes a Holiday on Ice"	James Burrows	Ken Levine & David Isaacs	November 9, 1989	36.2	24.3 / 38 / #2
176	8	"For Real Men Only"	James Burrows	David Pollock & Elias Davis	November 16, 1989	36.1	24.0 / 37 / #4
177	9	"Two Girls for Every Boyd"	James Burrows	Dan O'Shannon & Tom Anderson	November 23, 1989	28.4	16.5 / 31 / #13
178	10	"The Art of the Steal"	James Burrows	Sue Herring	November 30, 1989	37.1	25.4 / 40 / #2
179	11	"Feeble Attraction"	Andy Ackerman	Dan O'Shannon & Tom Anderson	December 7, 1989	36.2	24.2 / 38 / #2
180	12	"Sam Ahoy"	James Burrows	David Lloyd	December 14, 1989	33.3	22.5 / 36 / #2
181	13	"Sammy and the Professor"	James Burrows	Brian Pollack & Mert Rich	January 4, 1990	35.8	24.2 / 36 / #1
182	14	"What Is... Cliff Clavin?"	Andy Ackerman	Dan O'Shannon & Tom Anderson	January 18, 1990	37.7	24.7 / 37 / #1
183	15	"Finally! Part 1"	James Burrows	Ken Levine & David Isaacs	January 25, 1990	37.9	25.0 / 37 / #3
184	16	"Finally! Part 2"	James Burrows	Ken Levine & David Isaacs	February 1, 1990	33.4	22.7 / 34 / #2
185	17	"Woody or Won't He"	Andy Ackerman	Brian Pollack & Mert Rich	February 8, 1990	34.5	22.8 / 35 / #2
186	18	"Severe Crane Damage"	Andy Ackerman	Dan O'Shannon & Tom Anderson	February 15, 1990	35.2	23.3 / 35 / #2
187	19	"Indoor Fun with Sammy and Robby"	Andy Ackerman	Phoef Sutton	February 22, 1990	35.8	23.6 / 36 / #1
188	20	"50–50 Carla"	James Burrows	David Lloyd	March 8, 1990	34.4	23.4 / 36 / #2
189	21	"Bar Wars III: The Return of Tecumseh"	James Burrows	Ken Levine & David Isaacs	March 15, 1990	32.6	22.1 / 35 / #1
190	22	"Loverboyd"	James Burrows	Brian Pollack & Mert Rich	March 29, 1990	35.5	23.8 / 38 / #2
191	23	"The Ghost and Mrs. Lebec"	James Burrows	Dan Staley & Rob Long	April 12, 1990	30.1	19.7 / 33 / #2
192	24	"Mr. Otis Regrets"	Andy Ackerman	Ken Levine & David Isaacs	April 19, 1990	32.9	21.9 / 35 / #1
193	25	"Cry Hard" "Cry Hard, Part 1"	James Burrows	Dan O'Shannon & Tom Anderson	April 26, 1990	31.8	21.2 / 34 / #2
194	26	"Cry Harder" "Cry Hard, Part 2"	James Burrows	Story by : Bill Steinkellner; Teleplay by : Cheri Eichen & Bill Steinkellner & Phoef Sutton	May 3, 1990	30.8	21.1 / 33 / #3

=== Season 9 (1990–91) ===
No. overall	No. in season	Title	Directed by	Written by	Original release date	U.S. viewers (millions)
195	1	"Love Is a Really, Really, Perfectly Okay Thing"	James Burrows	Phoef Sutton	September 20, 1990	32.9
196	2	"Cheers Fouls Out" "Bar Wars IV"	James Burrows	Larry Balmagia	September 27, 1990	28.4
197	3	"Rebecca Redux"	James Burrows	Story by : Bill Steinkellner; Teleplay by : Cheri Eichen	October 4, 1990	30.4
198	4	"Where Nobody Knows Your Name"	Andy Ackerman	Dan O'Shannon & Tom Anderson	October 11, 1990	32.9
199	5	"Ma Always Liked You Best"	Andy Ackerman	Dan O'Shannon & Tom Anderson	October 18, 1990	31.7
200	6	"Grease"	James Burrows	Brian Pollack & Mert Rich	October 25, 1990	29.9
201	7	"Breaking in Is Hard to Do"	Andy Ackerman	Ken Levine & David Isaacs	November 1, 1990	33.2
202	8	"Cheers 200th Anniversary Special"	James Burrows & Andy Ackerman	Cheri Eichen & Bill Steinkellner & Phoef Sutton	November 8, 1990	45.9
203	9	"Bad Neighbor Sam"	James Burrows	Cheri Eichen & Bill Steinkellner	November 15, 1990	34.1
204	10	"Veggie-Boyd"	James Burrows	Dan Staley & Rob Long	November 22, 1990	29.1
205	11	"Norm and Cliff's Excellent Adventure"	James Burrows	Ken Levine & David Isaacs	December 6, 1990	32.7
206	12	"Woody Interruptus"	James Burrows	Dan Staley & Rob Long	December 13, 1990	33.8
207	13	"Honor Thy Mother"	James Burrows	Brian Pollack & Mert Rich	January 3, 1991	38.6
208	14	"Achilles Hill"	Andy Ackerman	Ken Levine & David Isaacs	January 10, 1991	36.3
209	15	"The Days of Wine and Neuroses"	James Burrows	Brian Pollack & Mert Rich	January 24, 1991	32.3
210	16	"Wedding Bell Blues"	James Burrows	Dan O'Shannon & Tom Anderson	January 31, 1991	32.7
211	17	"I'm Getting My Act Together and Sticking It in Your Face"	Andy Ackerman	Dan Staley & Rob Long	February 7, 1991	31.5
212	18	"Sam Time Next Year"	James Burrows	Larry Balmagia	February 14, 1991	31.9
213	19	"Crash of the Titans"	James Burrows	Dan Staley & Rob Long	February 21, 1991	33.3
214	20	"It's a Wonderful Wife"	James Burrows	Sue Herring	February 28, 1991	35.9
215	21	"Cheers Has Chili"	Andy Ackerman	Cheri Eichen & Bill Steinkellner & Phoef Sutton	March 14, 1991	30.3
216	22	"Carla Loves Clavin"	James Burrows	Dan Staley & Rob Long	March 21, 1991	28.8
217	23	"Pitch It Again, Sam"	James Burrows	Dan O'Shannon & Tom Anderson	March 28, 1991	30.8
218	24	"Rat Girl"	James Burrows	Ken Levine & David Isaacs	April 4, 1991	33.4
219	25	"Home Malone"	Andy Ackerman	Dan O'Shannon & Tom Anderson	April 25, 1991	27.7
220	26	"Uncle Sam Wants You"	James Burrows	Dan Staley & Rob Long	May 2, 1991	31.3

=== Season 10 (1991–92) ===
No. overall	No. in season	Title	Directed by	Written by	Original release date	U.S. viewers (millions)
221	1	"Baby Balk"	James Burrows	Dan O'Shannon & Tom Anderson	September 19, 1991	31.4
222	2	"Get Your Kicks on Route 666"	James Burrows	Dan O'Shannon & Tom Anderson	September 26, 1991	30.3
223	3	"Madame LaCarla"	Tom Moore	Phoef Sutton	October 3, 1991	29.6
224	4	"The Norm Who Came to Dinner"	Tom Moore	Dan O'Shannon & Tom Anderson	October 10, 1991	27.8
225	5	"Ma's Little Maggie"	James Burrows	Tracy Newman & Jonathan Stark	October 17, 1991	24.5
226	6	"Unplanned Parenthood"	James Burrows	Dan Staley & Rob Long	October 24, 1991	25.3
227	7	"Bar Wars V: The Final Judgment"	James Burrows	Ken Levine & David Isaacs	October 31, 1991	28.2
228	8	"Where Have All the Floorboards Gone?"	James Burrows	Ken Levine & David Isaacs	November 7, 1991	29.3
229	9	"Head Over Hill"	John Ratzenberger	Dan Staley & Rob Long	November 14, 1991	27.8
230	10	"A Fine French Whine"	James Burrows	Dan Staley & Rob Long	November 21, 1991	29.2
231	11	"I'm Okay, You're Defective"	James Burrows	Dan Staley & Rob Long	December 5, 1991	27.3
232	12	"Go Make"	James Burrows	Phoef Sutton	December 12, 1991	27.5
233	13	"Don't Shoot...I'm Only the Psychiatrist"	James Burrows	Kathy Ann Stumpe	January 2, 1992	30.0
234	14	"No Rest for the Woody"	James Burrows	Tracy Newman & Jonathan Stark	January 9, 1992	24.6
235	15	"My Son, the Father"	James Burrows	Dan Staley & Rob Long	January 16, 1992	26.7
236	16	"One Hugs, the Other Doesn't"	James Burrows	Cheri Eichen & Bill Steinkellner	January 30, 1992	26.4
237	17	"A Diminished Rebecca with a Suspended Cliff"	James Burrows	Dan O'Shannon & Tom Anderson	February 6, 1992	29.7
238	18	"License to Hill"	James Burrows	Ken Levine & David Isaacs	February 13, 1992	22.6
239	19	"Rich Man, Wood Man"	James Burrows	Daniel Palladino	February 20, 1992	21.9
240	20	"Smotherly Love"	James Burrows	Kathy Ann Stumpe	February 27, 1992	26.7
241	21	"Take Me Out of the Ball Game"	James Burrows	Kathy Ann Stumpe	March 26, 1992	23.9
242	22	"Rebecca's Lover...Not"	James Burrows	Tracy Newman & Jonathan Stark	April 23, 1992	22.1
243	23	"Bar Wars VI: This Time It's for Real"	Rick Beren	Ken Levine & David Isaacs	April 30, 1992	30.5
244	24	"Heeeeere's...Cliffy!"	James Burrows	Ken Levine & David Isaacs	May 7, 1992	25.4
245	25	"An Old-Fashioned Wedding"	James Burrows	David Lloyd	May 14, 1992	32.9
246	26	"An Old-Fashioned Wedding"	James Burrows	David Lloyd	May 14, 1992	32.9

=== Season 11 (1992–93) ===
No. overall	No. in season	Title	Directed by	Written by	Original release date	U.S. viewers (millions)
247	1	"The Little Match Girl"	James Burrows	Dan Staley & Rob Long	September 24, 1992	28.7
248	2	"The Beer Is Always Greener"	James Burrows	Tom Leopold	October 1, 1992	24.8
249	3	"The King of Beers"	John Ratzenberger	Dan O'Shannon	October 8, 1992	23.1
250	4	"The Magnificent Six"	James Burrows	Sue Herring	October 22, 1992	20.6
251	5	"Do Not Forsake Me O' My Postman"	James Burrows	Ken Levine & David Isaacs	October 29, 1992	24.0
252	6	"Teaching with the Enemy"	James Burrows	Tom Anderson	November 5, 1992	28.5
253	7	"The Girl in the Plastic Bubble"	James Burrows	Dan O'Shannon	November 12, 1992	29.6
254	8	"Ill-Gotten Gaines"	James Burrows	Fred Graver	November 19, 1992	24.0
255	9	"Feelings...Whoa, Whoa, Whoa"	Rick Beren	Kathy Ann Stumpe	December 3, 1992	22.9
256	10	"Daddy's Middle-Aged Girl"	James Burrows	Rebecca Parr Cioffi	December 10, 1992	21.4
257	11	"Love Me, Love My Car"	James Burrows	David Lloyd	December 17, 1992	23.4
258	12	"Sunday Dinner"	James Burrows	Fred Graver	January 7, 1993	22.7
259	13	"Norm's Big Audit"	John Ratzenberger	Tom Leopold	January 14, 1993	25.9
260	14	"It's a Mad, Mad, Mad Bar"	James Burrows	Rebecca Parr Cioffi	January 21, 1993	25.4
261	15	"Loathe and Marriage"	James Burrows	Ken Levine & David Isaacs	February 4, 1993	27.1
262	16	"Is There a Doctor in the Howe?"	James Burrows	Kathy Ann Stumpe	February 11, 1993	28.4
263	17	"The Bar Manager, the Shrink, His Wife and Her Lover"	James Burrows	Kathy Ann Stumpe	February 18, 1993	24.7
264	18	"The Last Picture Show"	James Burrows	Fred Graver	February 25, 1993	28.0
265	19	"Bar Wars VII: The Naked Prey"	James Burrows	Ken Levine & David Isaacs	March 18, 1993	27.5
266	20	"Look Before You Sleep"	James Burrows	Rebecca Parr Cioffi	April 1, 1993	26.3
267	21	"Woody Gets an Election"	James Burrows	Dan O'Shannon & Tom Anderson & Dan Staley & Rob Long	April 22, 1993	27.6
268	22	"It's Lonely on the Top"	James Burrows	Heide Perlman	April 29, 1993	29.8
269	23	"Rebecca Gaines, Rebecca Loses"	James Burrows	David Lloyd	May 6, 1993	30.8
270	24	"Rebecca Gaines, Rebecca Loses"	James Burrows	David Lloyd	May 6, 1993	30.8
271	25	"The Guy Can't Help It"	James Burrows	David Angell & Peter Casey & David Lee	May 13, 1993	29.5
272	26	"One for the Road"	James Burrows	Glen Charles & Les Charles	May 20, 1993	80.4
273	27	"One for the Road"	James Burrows	Glen Charles & Les Charles	May 20, 1993	80.4
274	28	"One for the Road"	James Burrows	Glen Charles & Les Charles	May 20, 1993	80.4

== Notes ==
=== References ===
- Bjorklund, Dennis A. (1993). Cheers TV Show: A Comprehensive Reference. Praetorian Publishing. ISBN 9780967985237. Another edition
- Bjorklund, Dennis A (September 2014) [First published in 1993 as print edition]. Cheers TV Show: A Comprehensive Reference (e-Book ed.). Praetorian Publishing. ISBN 9780967985237.
- Bjorklund, Dennis A (2017). Cheers TV Show: A Comprehensive Reference (e-Book ed.). Praetorian Publishing. ISBN 9780967985237.

=== Ratings notes ===
Season 1

According to Los Angeles Times, ratings from 1982 to 1983 were based on 83.3 million households with at least one television set. "Television Ratings" column list is located at Part VI, "Calendar" section. Below sources originated from Los Angeles Times, republished in microfilm copies, which may be located in your local library.

Season 2

Except where noted, they were originally published in print editions of The Miami Herald newspaper.

Season 3

According to Los Angeles Times, Nielsen ratings of 1984–85 were based on 84.9 million households.

Season 4

According to the Daily Breeze, a newspaper from Torrance, California, the 1985–86 ratings are based on 85.9 million households with at least one television.

Season 5

According to the 15 May 1987 article from The Argus-Press, the 1986–87 ratings were based on 87.4 million households with at least one television set. Unless otherwise, the sources were of the newspaper Pittsburgh Post-Gazette.

Season 6

Unless otherwise, the main source of Nielsen ratings is the newspaper Pittsburgh Post-Gazette. According to that main source, ratings of 1987–88 were based on 88.6 million households that have at least one television.

Season 7

Unless otherwise, the main source of Nielsen ratings is the newspaper Pittsburgh Post-Gazette. According to that main source, ratings of 1988–89 were based on 90.4 million households that have at least one television.

Season 8

According to many newspapers, including the main source USA Today, the 1989–90 Nielsen ratings are based on 92.1 million households that have at least one television.
